= List of county roads in Palm Beach County, Florida =

- County road shields used in Palm Beach County

Highway names
- Interstates: Interstate X (I-X)
- US Highways: U.S. Highway X (US X)
- State: State Road X (SR X)
- County: County Road X (CR X)

System links
- County roads in Florida; County roads in Palm Beach County

The following is a list of county roads in Palm Beach County, Florida. Roads are maintained locally by the Palm Beach County Engineering and Public Works Department. Nearly every route in this list is a former state road since decommissioned by the Florida Department of Transportation. Most routes are signed using standard county road shields, but some are unsigned on streets.

== County Road A1A ==
County Road A1A
- Location: Juno Beach–Jupiter
- Length: 6.2 mi (10.0 km)

County Road A1A is a former routing of SR A1A through Juno Beach and Jupiter. It serves as a paralleling alternate route to Federal Highway (US 1), running parallel to the Atlantic Ocean. CR A1A is often signed as "SR A1A" in green street signs despite county designation shields and maintenance. The road is known as Ocean Drive in Juno Beach and Ocean Boulevard in Jupiter, and is closed to through trucks.

Major intersections

Location	mi	km	Destinations	Notes
Juno Beach	0.0	0.0	US 1 / Juno Isles Boulevard	
Jupiter	5.2	8.4	CR 706 west (Indiantown Road) to I-95 / Florida's Turnpike	Eastern terminus of CR 706 (former SR 706)
Jupiter	6.2	10.0	US 1	
1.000 mi = 1.609 km; 1.000 km = 0.621 mi

== County Road 700 ==
County Road 700
- Location: Twentymile Bend
- Length: 4.8 mi (7.7 km)

County Road 700 is Connors Highway from an intersection with US 98 / US 441 / SR 80 and SR 700 to CR 880 in Twentymile Bend.

The road is a former routing of US 98, US 441, and SR 700. It has a posted speed limit of 55 miles per hour (89 km/h).

Major intersections

Location	mi	km	Destinations	Notes
	0.0	0.0	US 98 / US 441 / SR 80 / SR 700 west	Eastern terminus of SR 700
Twentymile Bend	4.8	7.7	CR 880 – Loxahatchee National Wildlife Refuge	Former SR 880
1.000 mi = 1.609 km; 1.000 km = 0.621 mi

== County Road 702 ==
County Road 702
- Location: West Palm Beach
- Length: 5.5 mi (8.9 km)

County Road 702 is 45th Street from Jog Road to US 1. The road was formerly designated SR 702.

Major intersections

Location	mi	km	Destinations	Notes
West Palm Beach	0.0	0.0	Jog Road north	Roadway turns north
West Palm Beach	2.1	3.4	SR 809 (Military Trail)	
West Palm Beach	3.1	5.0	I-95 – Miami, Daytona Beach	Exit 74 on I-95
West Palm Beach	3.3	5.3	Congress Avenue	
Mangonia Park	4.5	7.2	Australian Avenue (CR 704A)	Former SR 704A
West Palm Beach	5.2	8.4	CR 811 north (Greenwood Avenue)	Southern terminus of CR 811 (former SR 811); former routing of Dixie Highway
West Palm Beach	5.5	8.9	US 1 (Broadway) / 45th Street east	Road continues east for two blocks without designation
1.000 mi = 1.609 km; 1.000 km = 0.621 mi

== County Road 704A ==
County Road 704A
- Location: West Palm Beach–Riviera Beach
- Length: 7.4 mi (11.9 km)

County Road 704A is Australian Avenue in West Palm Beach. The road is an extension of Congress Avenue (SR 807), and begins just north of an interchange with Southern Boulevard (US 98 / SR 80). The road terminates at an intersection with Blue Heron Boulevard (SR 708) in Riviera Beach. The road was formerly designated SR 704A.

== County Road 706 ==
County Road 706
- Location: near Indiantown–Jupiter
- Length: 12.6 mi (20.3 km)

County Road 706 exists along two sections of Indiantown Road in and around Jupiter. The western segment was formerly designated SR 706, while the eastern segment is an extension of the current state road.

== County Road 707 ==
County Road 707
- Location: Tequesta
- Length: 1.8 mi (2.9 km)

County Road 707 is South Beach Road from US 1 / SR 811 to the Martin County line in Tequesta. It was formerly designated SR 707.

== County Road 711 ==
County Road 711
- Location: near Palm Beach Gardens–near Jupiter
- Length: 3.9 mi (6.3 km)

County Road 711 is Pratt Whitney Road from SR 710 west of Palm Beach Gardens north to the Martin County line west of Jupiter. It was formerly designated SR 711.

Major intersections

Location	mi	km	Destinations	Notes
	0.0	0.0	SR 710 (Bee-Line Highway)	Continues west without designation
	2.8	4.5	Indiantown Road (CR 706)	Former SR 706
	3.9	6.3	CR 711 north (Pratt Whitney Road)	Continuation into Martin County
1.000 mi = 1.609 km; 1.000 km = 0.621 mi

== County Road 716 ==
- Location: West Palm Beach

County Road 716 is Palm Beach Lakes Boulevard from SR 704 west of Palm Beach Gardens throughout West Palm Beach.

== County Road 717 ==
County Road 717
- Location: Belle Glade and Pahokee
- Length: 7.6 mi (12.2 km)

County Road 717 exists in two segments. The first is a northwestern extension of SR 717 in Belle Glade, connecting SR 715 (Southwest 16th Street) with the Lake Okeechobee Scenic Trail and the Torry Island campground. The second segment begins at SR 729 in Pahokee and travels on Muck City Road east to SR 700 south of Bryant.

Both routes were formerly designated SR 717.

Major intersections

Location	mi	km	Destinations	Notes
Belle Glade	0.0	0.0	Point Chosen Swing Bridge / Lake Okeechobee Scenic Trail	Continues west to Torry Island
Belle Glade	2.0	3.2	SR 715 (Southwest 16th Street) / SR 717 south (Canal Street North)	Northern terminus of SR 717
Gap in route
Pahokee	0.0	0.0	SR 729 (State Market Road) to US 98 / US 441 / SR 15	
	5.6	9.0	SR 700	Former routing of US 98
1.000 mi = 1.609 km; 1.000 km = 0.621 mi

== County Road 782 ==
County Road 782
- Location: Kings Point–Delray Beach
- Length: 5.2 mi (8.4 km)

County Road 782 is the unsigned designation for Linton Boulevard in Kings Point and Delray Beach. CR 782's western terminus is at Jog Road (former SR 845) and it travels east to Ocean Boulevard (SR A1A).

The road was formerly designated SR 782.

Major intersections

Location	mi	km	Destinations	Notes
Kings Point	0.0	0.0	Jog Road – Morikami Museum	Former SR 845
Kings Point–Delray Beach line	1.5	2.4	Military Trail (CR 809)	Former SR 809
Delray Beach	3.3	5.3	Congress Avenue (CR 807)	Former SR 807
Delray Beach	3.6	5.8	I-95 – Miami, West Palm Beach	Exit 51 on I-95
Delray Beach	4.5	7.2	Old Dixie Highway	
Delray Beach	4.7	7.6	US 1 (Federal Highway)	
Delray Beach	5.0	8.0	Intracoastal Waterway bridge	
Delray Beach	5.2	8.4	SR A1A (Ocean Boulevard)	
1.000 mi = 1.609 km; 1.000 km = 0.621 mi

== County Road 792 ==
County Road 792
- Location: Golf–Ocean Ridge
- Length: 4.4 mi (7.1 km)

County Road 792 is the unsigned designation for part of Woolbright Road around Boynton Beach. CR 792 begins at an intersection with Military Trail, which itself is a state-turned-county road. The road's eastern terminus is SR A1A. CR 792 was formerly designated SR 792.

Major intersections

Location	mi	km	Destinations	Notes
Golf	0.00	0.00	Military Trail (CR 809) / Woolbright Road west	Former SR 809; road continues west without designation
Boynton Beach	2.10	3.38	Congress Avenue (CR 807)	Former SR 807
Boynton Beach	3.20	5.15	I-95 – Miami, West Palm Beach	Exit 56 on I-95
Boynton Beach	4.00	6.44	US 1 (Federal Highway)	
Intracoastal Waterway	4.20	6.76	Drawbridge	
Ocean Ridge	4.40	7.08	SR A1A (Ocean Boulevard)	
1.000 mi = 1.609 km; 1.000 km = 0.621 mi

== County Road 794 ==
County Road 794
- Location: Boca Raton
- Length: 5.1 mi (8.2 km)

County Road 794 is an unsigned extension of SR 794 along Yamato Road within incorporated and unincorporated Boca Raton.

== County Road 798 ==
County Road 798
- Location: Boca Raton
- Length: 11.3 mi (18.2 km)

County Road 798 is Palmetto Park Road in unincorporated and incorporated Boca Raton. The road was formerly designated SR 798. CR 798 forms the north–south boundary in the Boca Raton street numbering grid.

The road begins at an intersection with Glades Road (CR 808) outside the city limits and terminates at Ocean Boulevard (SR A1A) within Boca Raton.

Major intersections

Location	mi	km	Destinations	Notes
	0.0	0.0	CR 808 east (Glades Road)	Western terminus of CR 808
	3.0	4.8	US 441 / SR 7 to SR 869 (Sawgrass Expressway)	
	6.1	9.8	SR 845 (Powerline Road)	
Boca Raton	7.6	12.2	Military Trail (CR 809) – Lynn University	Former SR 809
Boca Raton	8.3	13.4	I-95 – Miami, West Palm Beach	Exit 44 on I-95
Boca Raton	10.2	16.4	Dixie Highway	
Boca Raton	10.3	16.6	US 1 (Federal Highway)	
Boca Raton	10.9– 11.0	17.5– 17.7	Intracoastal Waterway bridge	
Boca Raton	11.3	18.2	SR A1A (Ocean Boulevard)	
1.000 mi = 1.609 km; 1.000 km = 0.621 mi

== County Road 806A ==
County Road 806A
- Location: Delray Beach
- Length: 0.7 mi (1,100 m)

County Road 806A is a short segment of George Bush Boulevard in Delray Beach. The road, formerly SR 806A, begins at an intersection with Federal Highway (US 1) and heads east, bridging the Intracoastal Waterway, to terminate at Ocean Boulevard (SR A1A).

Major intersections

The entire route is in Delray Beach.

mi	km	Destinations	Notes
0.0	0.0	US 1 south (Northeast 5th Avenue)	One-way southbound
0.1	0.16	US 1 north (Northeast 6th Avenue)	One-way northbound
0.3– 0.4	0.48– 0.64	Intracoastal Waterway bridge	
0.7	1.1	SR A1A (Ocean Boulevard)	
1.000 mi = 1.609 km; 1.000 km = 0.621 mi

== County Road 807 ==
County Road 807
- Location: Boca Raton–Palm Springs
- Length: 15.9 mi (25.6 km)

County Road 807 is a southern extension of SR 807 along Congress Avenue. It was formerly designated SR 807.

== County Road 808 ==
County Road 808
- Location: near Boca Raton
- Length: 3.5 mi (5.6 km)

County Road 808 is a western extension of SR 808 along Glades Road in unincorporated Boca Raton.

== County Road 809 ==
County Road 809
- Location: Boca Raton–Greenacres, Palm Beach Gardens–Jupiter
- Length: 27.0 mi (43.5 km)

County Road 809 is split into two segments of Military Trail that sandwich SR 809. The southern section was formerly a state-maintained road, while the northern is always a county-maintained extension.

== County Road 809A ==
County Road 809A
- Location: Loxahatchee–North Palm Beach
- Length: 13.4 mi (21.6 km)

County Road 809A is the designation for Northlake Boulevard in the vicinity of Palm Beach Gardens. It was formerly designated SR 809 west of Military Trail and SR 809A east of it.

== County Road 811 ==
County Road 811
- Location: West Palm Beach–North Palm Beach
- Length: 4.1 mi (6.6 km)

County Road 811 comprises a portion of Dixie Highway in West Palm Beach, which itself is a historic auto trail. This segment of the trail was formerly designated SR 811.

== County Road 812 ==
County Road 812
- Location: near Wellington–Lantana
- Length: 9.5 mi (15.3 km)

County Road 812 is the designation for Lantana Road from southeast of Wellington into Lantana, just south of Lake Worth. The road was formerly designated SR 812.

Major intersections

Location	mi	km	Destinations	Notes
	0.0	0.0	US 441 / SR 7	
	3.6	5.8	Jog Road	
Atlantis	5.7	9.2	Military Trail (CR 809)	Former SR 809
Atlantis	6.9	11.1	Congress Avenue (CR 807)	Former SR 807
	7.5	12.1	Lantana Airport	
Lake Osborne	7.9	12.7	Bridge	
Lantana	8.50	13.68	I-95 – Miami, West Palm Beach	Exit 61 on I-95
Lantana	9.50	15.29	US 1 (Federal Highway) – Beach	
1.000 mi = 1.609 km; 1.000 km = 0.621 mi

== County Road 827 ==
County Road 827
- Location: Okeelanta–near Parkland
- Length: 23.4 mi (37.7 km)

County Road 827 is the designation for three former segments of SR 827: an unnamed segment south of Belle Glade, Browns Farms Road east of Belle Glade, and Loxahatchee Road near the northern border of Parkland. The original route has since been bisected by the Loxahatchee National Wildlife Refuge.

== County Road 827A ==
County Road 827A
- Location: Okeelanta–Belle Glade
- Length: 3.7 mi (6.0 km)

County Road 827A is an unnamed road south of Belle Glade, serving as an alternate route to US 27 along with CR 827. The road was formerly designated SR 827A.

Major intersections

Location	mi	km	Destinations	Notes
Okeelanta	0.0	0.0	CR 827 west	Eastern terminus of CR 827
Belle Glade	3.7	6.0	SR 80 (Main Street)	
1.000 mi = 1.609 km; 1.000 km = 0.621 mi

== County Road 880 ==
County Road 880
- Location: Belle Glade–Twentymile Bend
- Length: 18.7 mi (30.1 km)
- Existed: August 2, 1994–present

County Road 880 is a signed route from Belle Glade to Twentymile Bend. It is a former routing of SR 80 (which now uses the Hooker Highway).
