= F45 =

F45 may refer to:

== Ships ==
- Brazilian frigate União (F-45), a Niterói-class frigate of the Brazilian Navy
- HMS Hector (F45), an armed merchant cruiser of the Royal Navy
- HMS Khartoum (F45), a K-class frigate of the Royal Navy
- HMS Minerva (F45), a Leander-class frigate of the Royal Navy
- INS Teg (F45), a Talwar-class frigate of the Indian Navy

== Aircraft and Airports ==
- Firecatcher F-45, a single-turboprop aircraft designed for aerial firefighting, air freight and commuter airlines.
- Fairchild 45, a rare American 1930s vintage aircraft
- North Palm Beach County General Aviation Airport, in Florida (location identifier: F45)

== Other uses ==
- BMW 2 Series (F45), an automobile
- EMD F45, an American diesel-electric locomotive
- F45 Training, an Australian multinational chain of fitness clubs
- Somatic symptom disorder (medical classification code: F45)
