= Florida State Road 704 =

State highway in Florida, United States

State Road 704
- Okeechobee Boulevard
- SR 704 in red, CR 704A in blue

Route information
- Maintained by FDOT
- Length: 10.199 mi (16.414 km)
- Existed: 1945 renumbering (definition)–present

Major junctions
- West end: SR 7 in Royal Palm Beach
- Florida's Turnpike near West Palm Beach; I-95 in West Palm Beach; US 1 in West Palm Beach
- East end: SR A1A in Palm Beach

Location
- Country: United States
- State: Florida
- Counties: Palm Beach

Highway system
- Florida State Highway System; Interstate; US; State; Former; Pre‑1945; Toll; Scenic
← SR 700	→ SR 706

State Road 704 (SR 704), also known as Okeechobee Boulevard, is a 10.199-mile-long (16.414 km) east–west boulevard in the West Palm Beach area, known for being dangerous to pedestrians and bicyclists. It extends from an intersection with SR 7 at the border of West Palm Beach and Royal Palm Beach and just south of The Acreage at the western end to an intersection with SR A1A in Palm Beach at the east end.

== Route description ==
State Road 704 begins at the intersection of Okeechobee Boulevard and State Road 7, with commercial areas surrounding three of the corners. SR 704 heads east through the suburban West Palm Beach area known as Century Village passing by strip malls and gated communities. Just east of its intersection with Jog Road, SR 704 crosses over Florida's Turnpike, and provides access to the turnpike just east of the bridge. At this point, Okeechobee Boulevard becomes a stroad, commercial and development becomes denser, and the West Palm Beach skyline becomes visible. The stroad continues, passing through Haverhill Boulevard, Military Trail and Palm Beach Lakes Boulevard. East of Congress Avenue, which provides access to President Donald J. Trump International Airport, SR 704 heads towards an interchange with Interstate 95 (I-95 and SR 9), crossing over it, and immediately crosses Clear Lake, with a diamond interchange with Australian Avenue at the eastern end of the lake. One block east of the interchange, SR 704 crosses railroad tracks owned by Tri-Rail (formerly the CSX Miami Subdivision), and becomes a one-way pair, as it travels along the southern end of downtown West Palm Beach, passing by CityPlace to the north and the Palm Beach County Convention Center to the south. East of the two complexes, Okeechobee Boulevard crosses the Florida East Coast Railroad, and then the southbound lanes of U.S. Route 1 (US 1), with the eastbound lanes passing by the northern end of Palm Beach Atlantic University from here to the Intracoastal Waterway. One block east of southbound US 1, SR 704 crosses the northbound lanes of US 1, with the westbound lanes becoming Lakeview Avenue. Two blocks east of northbound US 1, SR 704 crosses the Intracoastal Waterway (Lake Worth) via the Royal Park Bridge, and enters Palm Beach as Royal Palm Way, and travels three blocks through the town before ending one block west of the ocean at SR A1A.

West of the western terminus of SR 704, Okeechobee Boulevard continues for another 7.04 miles (11.33 km), acting as the main east-west road of Royal Palm Beach and Loxhatchee Groves, until an intersection with Cheetham Hill Boulevard in Loxahatchee. Just beyond the end of Okeechobee Boulevard (but accessible only from Southern Boulevard, US 98-US 441/SR 80) is Lion Country Safari, a zoological park through which visitors drive instead of walk.

== History ==
SR 704 was established in the 1945 renumbering. The road was not designated as a state road in the pre-1945 system, and only known as a local road called Okeechobee Road.

== Major intersections ==
The entire route is in Palm Beach County.

Location	mi	km	Destinations	Notes
Royal Palm Beach–West Palm Beach line	0.000	0.000	SR 7 to SR 80 / US 441 / US 98 / Okeechobee Road west	Road continues west without designation
West Palm Beach	3.034	4.883	Jog Road	
	3.954	6.363	Florida's Turnpike	Exit 99 on Turnpike
Westgate	5.564	8.954	SR 809 (Military Trail)	
West Palm Beach	6.214	10.000	Palm Beach Lakes Boulevard (CR 716 east)	Western terminus of CR 716
West Palm Beach	7.075	11.386	Congress Avenue	
West Palm Beach	7.730	12.440	I-95 – Daytona Beach, Miami	Exit 70 on I-95
West Palm Beach	8.37	13.47	Australian Avenue (CR 704A) – Airport	Interchange; former SR 704A
West Palm Beach	9.011	14.502	US 1 north (Quadrille Boulevard)	Western terminus of concurrency with US 1
West Palm Beach	9.106	14.655	US 1 south (Dixie Highway) – Norton Museum	Eastern terminus of concurrency with US 1
Lake Worth Lagoon	9.493– 9.704	15.278– 15.617	Royal Park Bridge	
Palm Beach	10.199	16.414	SR A1A (County Road)	Road continues east for one block without designation
1.000 mi = 1.609 km; 1.000 km = 0.621 mi: Concurrency terminus; Tolled

== County Road 704A ==
County Road 704A
- Location: West Palm Beach–Riviera Beach
- Length: 7.4 mi (11.9 km)

County Road 704A (CR 704A) is the official designation of Australian Avenue, a partially limited access road connecting SR 708 (Blue Heron Boulevard) in Riviera Beach with US 98/SR 80 (Southern Boulevard) and SR 807 (Congress Avenue) in Glen Ridge. The road was formerly State Road 704A (SR 704A).

The southernmost 1.4 miles (2.3 km) serve President Donald J. Trump International Airport. North of its interchange with SR 704, Australian Avenue continues along the eastern shores of Clear Lake and Lake Mangonia, then northward as a surface road, passing through Mangonia Park before reaching its northern terminus, an intersection with Blue Heron Boulevard (SR 708) in Rivera Beach.

=== Major intersections ===
Location	mi	km	Destinations	Notes
West Palm Beach	0.0	0.0	SR 807 south (Congress Avenue)	Northern terminus of SR 807
West Palm Beach	0.0	0.0	US 98 / SR 80 (Southern Boulevard) to I-95 / Florida's Turnpike	Interchange
West Palm Beach	0.6	0.97	Turnage Boulevard – President Donald J. Trump International Airport	
West Palm Beach	0.8	1.3	Belvedere Road to I-95 – Air Cargo	
West Palm Beach	2.0	3.2	SR 704 (Okeechobee Boulevard) – Downtown	
West Palm Beach	3.4	5.5	Palm Beach Lakes Boulevard (CR 716)	
Mangonia Park	5.4	8.7	45th Street (CR 702) to I-95	Former SR 702
Riviera Beach	6.6	10.6	SR 710 (Dr. Martin Luther King Jr. Boulevard)	
Riviera Beach	7.4	11.9	SR 708 (Blue Heron Boulevard) to I-95	
1.000 mi = 1.609 km; 1.000 km = 0.621 mi: Incomplete access
