= Florida State Road 710 =

State highway in Florida, United States

State Road 710

Route information
- Maintained by FDOT
- Length: 56.871 mi (91.525 km)

Major junctions
- West end: SR 70 near Okeechobee
- SR 76 near Indiantown; SR 708 in Riviera Beach; SR 809 in Riviera Beach
- East end: CR 811 in Riviera Beach

Location
- Country: United States
- State: Florida
- Counties: Okeechobee, Martin, Palm Beach

Highway system
- Florida State Highway System; Interstate; US; State; Former; Pre‑1945; Toll; Scenic
← SR 708	→ SR 713

State Road 710 (SR 710) is a 57-mile (92 km) northwest-southeast route connecting SR 70 near Okeechobee, three miles (5 km) from the northern tip of Lake Okeechobee in south central Florida, to President Barack Obama Highway (CR 811) in Riviera Beach. Most of the route is also known as Bee-Line Highway and Dr. Martin Luther King Jr. Boulevard, as it parallels the railroad tracks maintained by CSX Transportation (their Auburndale Subdivision) and used by Amtrak; and doesn't have a turn or curve in the 48 miles (77 km) southeast of Sherman, except for a small bend northwest of North Palm Beach County General Aviation Airport. Near the middle of the highway, where Indiantown is located, the route is also known as Warfield Boulevard, named after S. Davies Warfield, the president of the Seaboard Air Line Railroad who originally built the adjacent railroad tracks.

== Route description ==
The Bee-Line Highway traverses the woodlands and wetlands north and east of Lake Okeechobee, with an occasional farm near its northwestern end. It is a popular truck route that is used as an alternative to US 441/US 98/SR 700. Along the way, SR 710 passes through Indiantown (near the St. Lucie Canal and midway along the Bee Line stretch) and West Palm Beach.

== History ==
The road was first built in 1924 by New York businessman William "Fingy" Conners as a toll road to carry people to his properties at Okeechobee and Connersville.

For a year in the 1940s, Bee Line Highway was part of State Road 66 before the number was changed to 710.

== Future ==
The Florida Department of Transportation (FDOT) conducted a Project Development and Environment (PD&E) Study to evaluate improvement alternatives for SR 710 from US 441 in Okeechobee County to CR 714 (SW Martin Highway) in Martin County. The PD&E Study received Location and Design Concept Acceptance on March 16, 2017, from the FDOT Office of Environmental Management. This allowed the project to move to the next stage of development.

== Major intersections ==
County	Location	mi	km	Destinations	Notes
Okeechobee		0.000	0.000	SR 70 – Okeechobee, Fort Pierce	
Okeechobee		5.832	9.386	CR 15A south (Southeast 86th Boulevard)	Northern terminus of CR 15A
Okeechobee		9.520	15.321	CR 15B south (Southeast 126th Boulevard)	Northern terminus of CR 15B
Martin		9.950	16.013	CR 714 east (Martin Highway)	Western terminus of CR 714
Martin	Indiantown	24.867	40.020	CR 609 north (Southwest Allapattah Road)	Southern terminus of CR 609
Martin	Indiantown	26.562	42.747	CR 726 east (Citrus Boulevard) – Palm City, Port St Lucie	Western terminus of CR 726
Martin	St. Lucie Canal (Okeechobee Waterway)	26.96	43.39	Big John Monahan Bridge	
Martin		27.411	44.114	To SR 76 – Port Mayaca, Stuart	Grade-separated interchange
Palm Beach	Apix	34.905	56.174	CR 706 east to I-95 / Florida's Turnpike – Jupiter	Western terminus of CR 706 and Indiantown Road
Palm Beach		39.612	63.749	Pratt Whitney Road (CR 711 north) / Innovation Drive	Southern terminus of CR 711; access Beeline Corporate Park
Palm Beach		44.095	70.964	North County General Aviation Airport	Access via Aviation Boulevard
Palm Beach	Palm Beach Gardens	46.737	75.216	SR 786 east (PGA Boulevard) to I-95 / Florida's Turnpike – Juno Beach	Western terminus of SR 786
Palm Beach	West Palm Beach–Palm Beach Gardens line	50.276	80.911	CR 809A (Northlake Boulevard) to I-95 – J.W. Corbett Wildlife Management Area	
Palm Beach	West Palm Beach–Palm Beach Gardens line	51.521	82.915	Jog Road (Access to Florida's Turnpike/SR 91)	SunPass-only interchange; exit 107 on Turnpike
Palm Beach	Riviera Beach	53.364	85.881	SR 708 east to I-95 – VA Hospital	Western terminus of SR 708
Palm Beach	Riviera Beach	53.804	86.589	SR 809 (Military Trail) to Florida's Turnpike	
Palm Beach	Riviera Beach	55.143	88.744	Congress Avenue – Tri-Rail	
Palm Beach	Riviera Beach	56.231	90.495	CR 704A (Australian Avenue)	Former SR 704A
Palm Beach	Riviera Beach	56.871	91.525	CR 811 (President Barack Obama Highway) – Port of Palm Beach	Former routing of Dixie Highway
1.000 mi = 1.609 km; 1.000 km = 0.621 mi: Electronic toll collection
