= Florida State Road 786 =

State highway in Florida, United States

State Road 786
- PGA Boulevard

Route information
- Maintained by FDOT
- Length: 8.647 mi (13.916 km)

Major junctions
- West end: SR 710 in Palm Beach Gardens
- Florida's Turnpike in Palm Beach Gardens; I-95 in Palm Beach Gardens
- East end: US 1 / SR A1A in Palm Beach Gardens

Location
- Country: United States
- State: Florida
- Counties: Palm Beach

Highway system
- Florida State Highway System; Interstate; US; State; Former; Pre‑1945; Toll; Scenic
← SR 780	→ SR 789

State Road 786 (SR 786), locally known as PGA Boulevard, is an 8.6-mile-long (13.84 km) east–west highway located completely within the city limits of Palm Beach Gardens, Florida. Serving as the major east-west route in the city, it spans from the Bee Line Highway (SR 710) to Federal Highway (U.S. Route 1 or US 1) and SR A1A.

== Route description ==
The western terminus is an intersection with Bee Line Highway (SR 710) near North Palm Beach County General Aviation Airport at the Palm Beach Gardens city limits. It begins as a two lane road through undeveloped sections of Palm Beach Gardens, with the first development on the road occurring after a canal crossing two miles from the western terminus and becomes a four lane road. The road then creates the border between two major golf country clubs, with the Country Club at Mirasol to the north and the Professional Golfers' Association of America's National Golf Club, where PGA Boulevard receives its name, to the south. Following the Avenue of Champions/Jog Road intersection, SR 786 reaches the intersection with Florida's Turnpike (SR 91), with an overpass with the toll road just east of it. To the east of the Turnpike, PGA Boulevard borders the BallenIsles Country Club to the south, and other residential communities to the north, and quickly transitions to a commercial road, with a shopping center on both sides of the road heading closer to Military Trail.

After this interchange, PGA Boulevard moves to the northeast and quickly approaches the interchange with Interstate (I-95 or SR 9), an overpass with SR 811 and access via a side road. This overpass also crosses the Florida East Coast Railway, where Tri-Rail has proposed adding a station. Afterwards, the road heads straight east and forms the southern boundary of The Gardens Mall, with other shopping centers on the southern side of the road. At the southeast end of the mall, the southern side of PGA Blvd. forms the northern border of the Palm Beach State College Palm Beach Gardens campus until an intersection with Prosperity Farms Road. Afterwards, the road passes through a drawbridge over a canal before reaching the eastern terminus at the intersection with Federal Highway (US 1-SR 5) and SR A1A. East of US 1, PGA Boulevard becomes Ocean Boulevard and SR A1A, which continue along a barrier island of the Atlantic Ocean and pass through John D. MacArthur Beach State Park.

== History ==
Most of the original alignment of the highway was known as "Monet Road" (named for a settlement located near the modern day intersection of RCA Boulevard and SR 811 in Palm Beach Gardens) and was a gravel road. The highway had received the "PGA Boulevard" name in 1965 six years after the incorporation of Palm Beach Gardens at the request of the city's founder John D. MacArthur. Following a realignment of SR 786 east of I-95, a portion of the old road was renamed "RCA Boulevard" due to the road serving a new RCA factory there.

From 1973 until 1987, SR 786 served as the temporary northern terminus of I-95 in southeastern Florida, when a previously approved alignment in which I-95 would be cosigned with Florida's Turnpike for a 41-mile (66 km) stretch from PGA Boulevard northbound to SR 70 in Fort Pierce was rescinded in favor of a separate alignment for I-95 The portion of I-95 north of PGA Boulevard was completed in 1987. Since then, PGA Boulevard has become an important commercial and commuter route due to the rapid population growth in northeastern Palm Beach County.

== Major intersections ==
The entire route is in Palm Beach Gardens, Palm Beach County.

mi	km	Destinations	Notes
0.000	0.000	SR 710 (Bee-Line Highway) – Indiantown, Okeechobee	
4.129	6.645	Florida's Turnpike – Orlando, Miami	Exit 109 on Turnpike
5.778	9.299	SR 809 south / CR 809 north (Military Trail)	Northern terminus of SR 809; southern terminus of CR 809
6.02	9.69	I-95 – Daytona Beach, West Palm Beach	Exit 79 on I-95
6.5	10.5	SR 811 (Alternate A1A)	Grade-separated interchange; former routing of Dixie Highway and SR A1A
8.273– 8.345	13.314– 13.430	PGA Boulevard Bridge over Lake Worth Creek	
8.647	13.916	US 1 (Federal Highway) / SR A1A south (Jack Nicklaus Drive)	
1.000 mi = 1.609 km; 1.000 km = 0.621 mi: Tolled
