= Indiantown Road =

Highway in Florida, United States

Indiantown Road
- State Road 706 and County Road 706
- CR 706 in blue, SR 706 in red

Route information
- Maintained by FDOT and Palm Beach E&PW
- Length: 17.378 mi (27.967 km) 4.778 miles (7.689 km) as SR 706; 12.6 miles (20.28 km) as CR 706
- Existed: 1945 renumbering–present

Major junctions
- West end: SR 710 near Indiantown
- Florida's Turnpike in Jupiter; I-95 in Jupiter; US 1 in Jupiter
- East end: SR A1A in Jupiter

Location
- Country: United States
- State: Florida
- County: Palm Beach

Highway system
- Florida State Highway System; Interstate; US; State; Former; Pre‑1945; Toll; Scenic
← SR 704	→ SR 708

Indiantown Road is a 17-mile (27 km) east–west road connecting inner Palm Beach County, with Florida's Turnpike, Interstate 95, and U.S. Route 1 in Jupiter, Florida. The road was formerly entirely designated as State Road 706 (SR 706), but the majority of it has been transferred to local jurisdiction and is now signed as County Road 706 (CR 706).

== Route description ==
=== West of Jupiter ===
Indiantown Road begins at an intersection with the Bee-Line Highway (SR 710) in the middle of the wetlands in northwest Palm Beach County, approximately 10 miles (16 km) east of Indiantown and roughly six miles from the site of the fake "ghost town" of Apix. It proceeds east with the CR 706 designation as a two-lane road with a speed limit of 55 miles per hour (89 km/h) with wetlands on either side. 4 miles (6.4 km) east, Indiantown Road comes to an intersection with Pratt Whitney Road, which itself is County Road 711 and formerly SR 711. As the road enters more civilization, it widens to become a divided boulevard with two lanes in each direction. It is not until an intersection with the Florida's Turnpike ramps that the road becomes three lanes in each direction and the speed limit decreases.

=== Jupiter ===
State Road 706 begins at the interchange between Florida's Turnpike and Indiantown Road in Jupiter, with SR 706 heading east, with the interchange with Interstate 95 one-quarter mile (0.40 km) from the Turnpike. East of I-95, Indiantown Road becomes a commercial road from here to the eastern terminus. It has intersections with Central Boulevard and Center Street, major roads in the town of Jupiter, along with county road Alternate A1A. Continuing east, it has a junction with Military Trail, followed by SR 811 in central Jupiter. The road then crosses a major drawbridge over the Intracoastal Waterway, and then intersects with US 1. Indiantown Road continues east under county maintenance (as CR 706) to County Road A1A, though this section of Indiantown Road is erroneously signed as "to SR A1A."

== History ==
Originally, SR 706 spanned 17 miles (27 km) from Bee Line Highway (SR 710) near Indiantown to its present eastern terminus. In the mid-1970s, Florida Department of Transportation downgraded the section west of the Turnpike to secondary status (and placed "S" stickers on the SR 706 signs), starting a sequence of events that started the reversion of the western segment to county control. This was part of a large set of transformations that particularly affected Florida south of State Road 70.

In the early 1970s, Indiantown Road was only two lanes and had two lights. The road at that time ended just west of Jupiter High school. Upon completion of the Interstate 95 corridor, an entrance ramp and an exit ramp were constructed connecting the two routes.

While SR 706 was primarily a rural road as recently as the 1980s, the region has become urbanized in recent years as the population growth of Florida Gold Coast and nearby Treasure Coast has been transforming the Atlantic coast of Florida south of Kennedy Space Center.

== Major intersections ==
The entire route is in Palm Beach County.

Location	mi	km	Destinations	Notes
	0.00	0.00	SR 710	Western terminus of CR 706
	4.00	6.44	CR 711 (Pratt Whitney Road)	Former SR 711
Jupiter	12.10 0.000	19.47 0.000	Florida's Turnpike	Route transition from CR 706 to SR 706; exit 116 on Turnpike
Jupiter	0.490	0.789	I-95 – Daytona Beach, West Palm Beach	Exit 87 on I-95
Jupiter	3.472	5.588	CR 809 south (Military Trail)	Northern terminus of CR 809; former SR 809
Jupiter	3.983	6.410	SR 811 (Alternate A1A)	Former routing of Dixie Highway and SR A1A
Jupiter	4.440– 4.694	7.145– 7.554	Indiantown Road Bridge over Lake Worth Creek	
Jupiter	4.778 0.00	7.689 0.00	US 1	Route transitions from SR 706 to CR 706
Jupiter	0.50	0.80	CR A1A	Former routing of SR A1A
1.000 mi = 1.609 km; 1.000 km = 0.621 mi: Route transition
