= Dixie Highway (Broward–Palm Beach) =

Highway in Florida, United States

State Road 811 and County Road 811
- Dixie Highway
- Segments of SR 811 in red, segments of CR 811 in blue, municipal segment in grey, CR 811A in magenta

Route information
- Maintained by FDOT, Broward Public Works, Palm Beach E&PW, and the cities of Pompano Beach, Boca Raton, and Delray Beach
- Length: 35.981 mi (57.906 km) 23.581 miles (37.950 km) as SR 811; 7.2 miles (11.59 km) as CR 811; 8.8 miles (14.16 km) without designation

Major junctions
- South end: US 1 / SR A1A in Fort Lauderdale
- SR 838 in Fort Lauderdale; SR 834 in Pompano Beach; SR 810 in Deerfield Beach; SR 808 in Boca Raton; SR 710 in West Palm Beach; SR 786 in Palm Beach Gardens; SR 706 in Jupiter
- North end: US 1 / CR 707 in Tequesta

Location
- Country: United States
- State: Florida
- Counties: Broward, Palm Beach

Highway system
- Florida State Highway System; Interstate; US; State; Former; Pre‑1945; Toll; Scenic
← SR 810	→ SR 812

Dixie Highway in Palm Beach and Broward counties carries two segments of the State Road 811 (SR 811) designation by Florida Department of Transportation, as well as the local County Road 811 (CR 811) in southeast Florida. The entire road comprises a section of the Dixie Highway, a National Auto Trail which eventually became a former routing of U.S. Route 1 after the route was shifted east to Federal Highway. One segment of SR 811 is in Broward County and the other is in Palm Beach County, Florida. The segments of SR 811 are supplemented by three shorter segments of CR 811, one of which is unsigned.

== Route description ==
=== Fort Lauderdale to Deerfield Beach ===
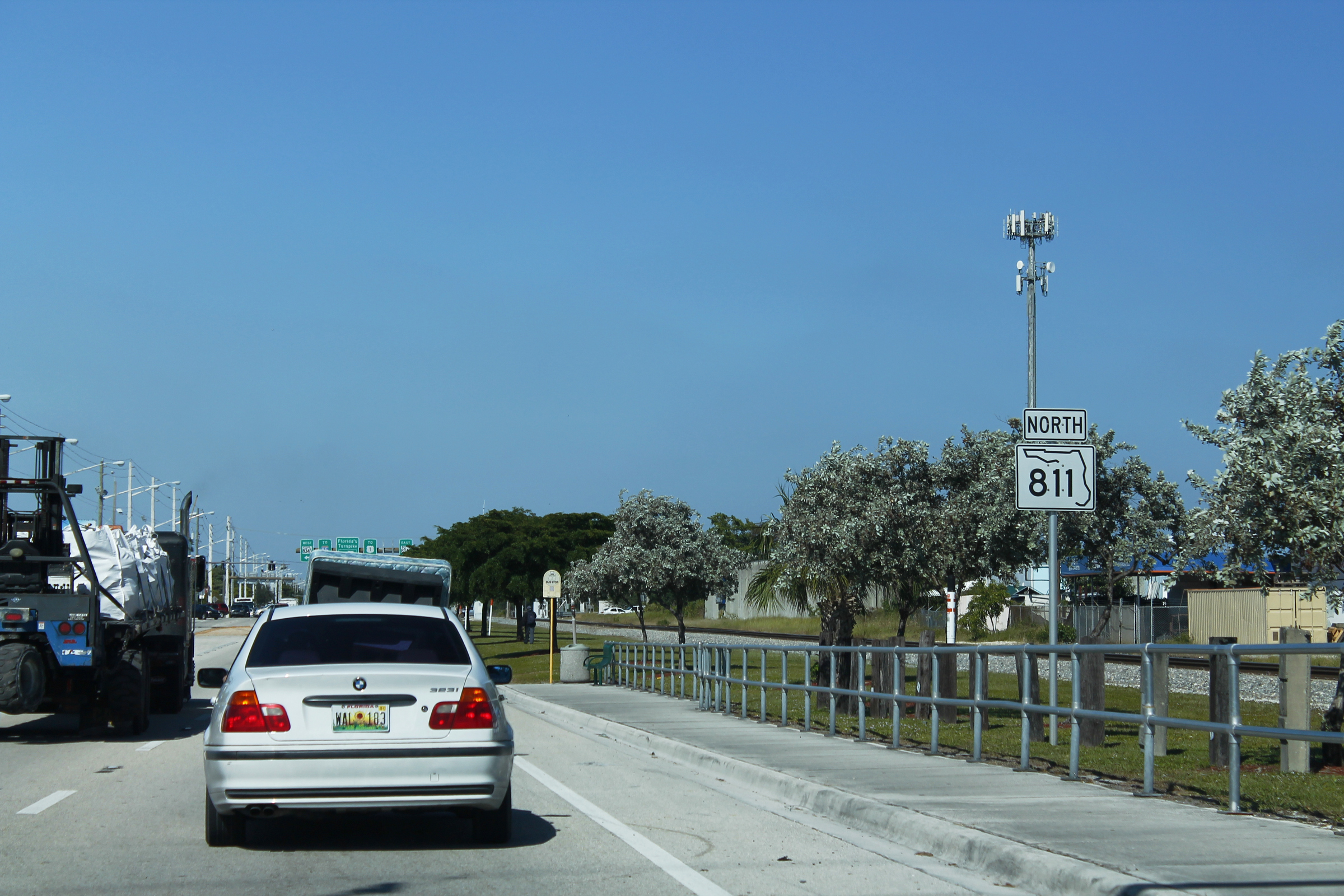
Florida State Road 811 posted on Dixie Highway in Pompano Beach.

In Broward County, an unsigned segment of CR 811 begins at an intersection with US 1 and SR A1A and travels north along East 3rd Avenue to meet SR 811 at Sunrise Boulevard (SR 838), all within the city of Fort Lauderdale.

The 14-mile (23 km) southern segment of SR 811 extends northward from Sunrise Boulevard (SR 838) in downtown Fort Lauderdale, going north, and ending at an intersection with Hillsboro Boulevard (SR 810) in Deerfield Beach. The southern segment of SR 811 is mostly known as Dixie Highway, though it goes by variety of names in certain locales: Northeast 4th Avenue in Fort Lauderdale, Wilton Drive in Wilton Manors, and Old Dixie Highway in Oakland Park and Deerfield Beach. The segment of road located in Pompano Beach is maintained by the city as of 2016, and is not part of the state highway system.

While the SR 811 designation ends at Hillsboro Boulevard, a short signed segment of CR 811 continues north for 0.4 miles (0.64 km) to a bridge over the Hillsboro Canal, which separates Palm Beach and Broward counties. North of here, Dixie Highway continues north into Boca Raton and Delray Beach without any state or county designation.

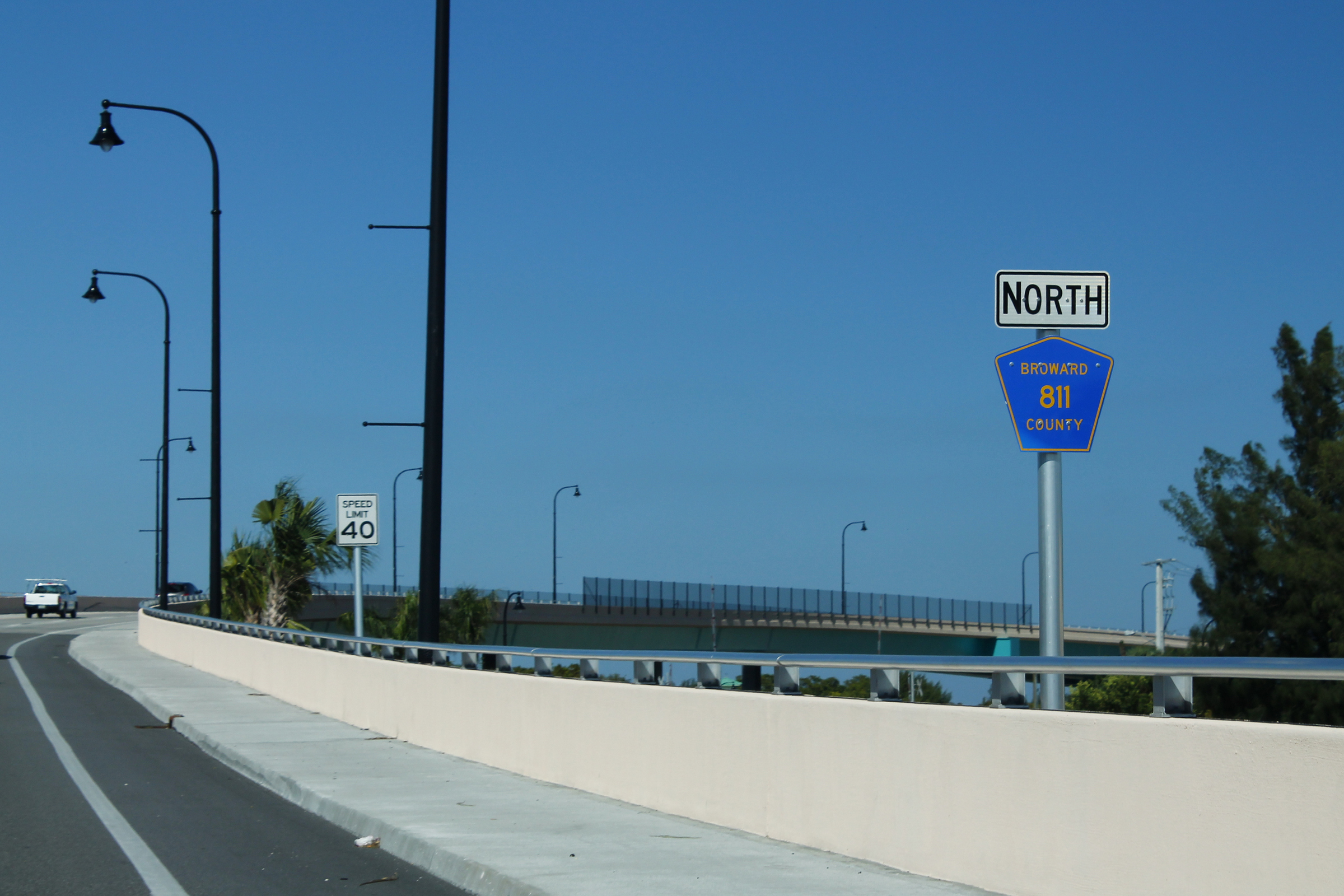
The bridge over the Hillsboro Canal is posted as Broward County Road 811 in Deerfield Beach.

Parallelling both US 1 to the east and Interstate 95 to the west, Dixie Highway is a major north–south commercial access road for northeastern Broward County cities. While much of the property that lines SR 811 is residential in nature, most of the route is adjacent to Florida East Coast Railroad tracks. Two hospitals (North Ridge Medical Center and the Pompano Beach Medical Center) are on the southern segment of SR 811, south of Pompano Beach Airpark, home base of the Goodyear Blimps.

=== Boca Raton and Delray Beach ===
As an undesignated local road, Dixie Highway closely parallels the Florida East Coast Railroad and Federal Highway (US 1), serving as an alternate north–south route to nearby roads in Boca Raton. It continues north into Delray Beach, terminating at 10th Street, where Swinton Avenue continues as a de facto extension northward. In Boca Raton, Dixie Highway serves as the border between "east" and west" street designations and addresses.

=== West Palm Beach to Jupiter ===
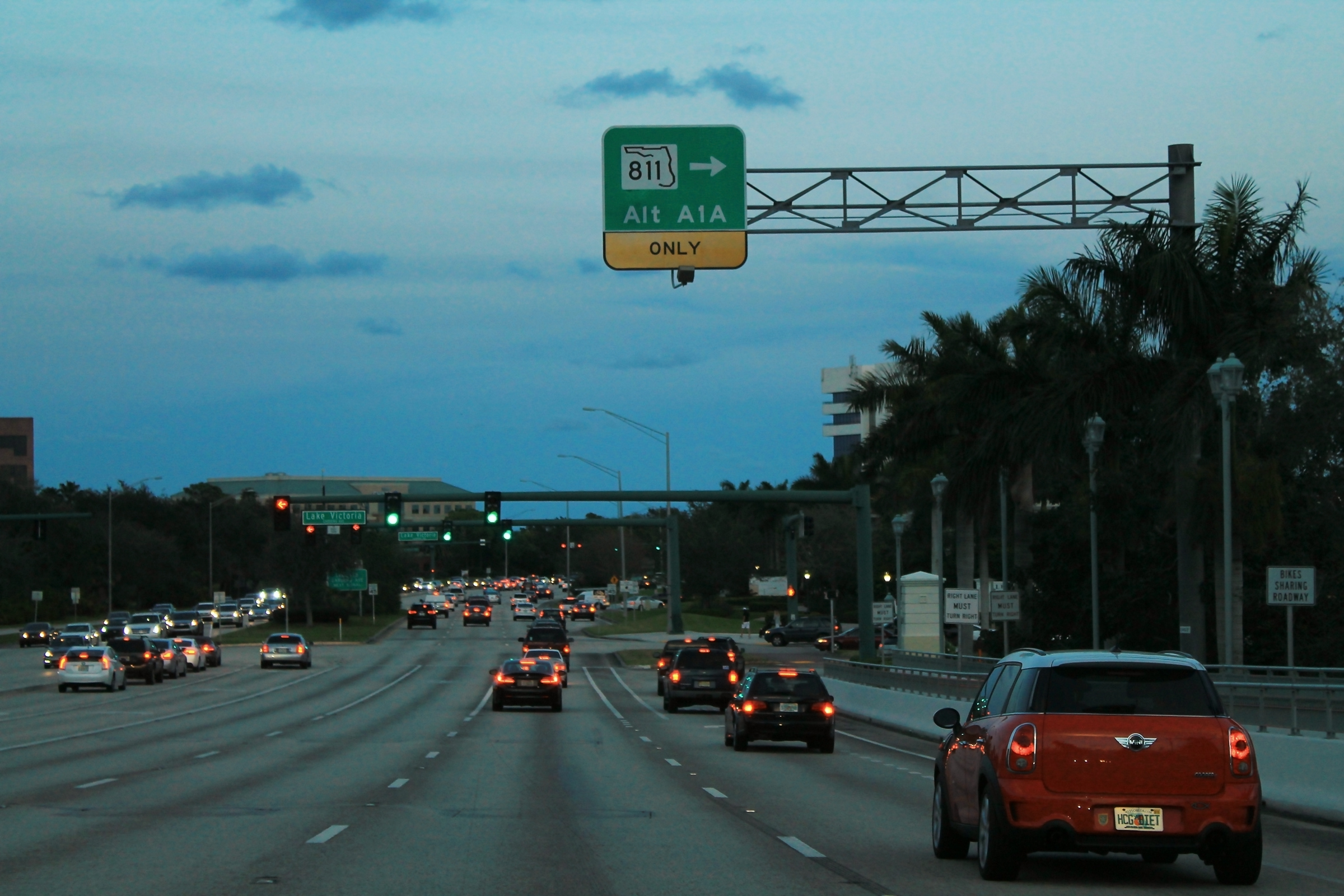
Florida State Road 811 posted as "Alternate A1A" on PGA Boulevard in Palm Beach Gardens

An unsigned segment of CR 811 begins at an intersection with 45th Street (unsigned CR 702) and Greenwood Avenue, traveling north along Greenwood Avenue, which later becomes the President Barack Obama Highway. Both of these roads closely parallel the Florida East Coast Railroad, and are renamed segments of Dixie Highway. In Lake Park, it jogs across the railroad tracks to 10th Street, and transitions to SR 811 at an intersection with Northlake Boulevard, which carries the SR 850 designation to the east and the CR 809A designation to the west.

The divided northern segment of SR 811 extends 11.1 miles (17.9 km) from Northlake Boulevard in North Palm Beach to its northern terminus, an intersection with U.S. Route 1 near Tequesta and Jupiter Inlet Colony, a mile north of Jupiter. While FDOT signs indicating the SR 811 designation are posted alongside the road, street signs (mostly overhead) identify it as Alternate A1A or Old Dixie Highway for the entire length of the route.

While the completion of I-95 in the late 1970s has diminished the importance of Alternate A1A as a commercial byway, the replacement of forest by the development of suburban residential districts have made SR 811 an important commuter road in addition to a bypass of US 1.

== Major intersections ==
County	Location	mi	km	Destinations	Notes
Broward	Fort Lauderdale	0.00	0.00	US 1 (Federal Highway) / SR A1A (Southeast 17th Street)	Southern terminus of CR 811
Broward	Fort Lauderdale	0.70	1.13	SR 736 (Davie Boulevard)	
Broward	Fort Lauderdale	1.70	2.74	SR 842 (Broward Boulevard)	
Broward	Fort Lauderdale	2.70 0.000	4.35 0.000	SR 838 (Sunrise Boulevard) to I-95 / SR A1A – Beaches	Route transition from CR 811 to SR 811
Broward	Oakland Park	2.338	3.763	SR 816 (Oakland Park Boulevard) to I-95	
Broward	Oakland Park	3.929	6.323	SR 870 (Commercial Boulevard) to I-95 / Florida's Turnpike	
Broward	Oakland Park–Fort Lauderdale line	4.946	7.960	Cypress Creek Road (CR 840) to I-95	
Broward	Pompano Beach	5.121	8.241	Bridge over C-14 Canal	Southern terminus of city maintenance
Broward	Pompano Beach	6.936	11.162	SR 814 (Atlantic Boulevard) to I-95 / Florida's Turnpike / SR 869 (Sawgrass Expressway) / US 1	
Broward	Pompano Beach	8.991	14.470	Copans Road to I-95 / US 1	
Broward	Pompano Beach–Deerfield Beach line	10.021	16.127	SR 834 (Sample Road) to I-95 / Florida's Turnpike / US 1	Northern terminus of city maintenance
Broward	Deerfield Beach	12.128	19.518	South 10th Street to I-95 / SR 869 (Sawgrass Expressway) / US 1	Former routing of SR 869
Broward	Deerfield Beach	13.124 0.00	21.121 0.00	SR 810 (Hillsboro Boulevard) to I-95 / US 1 / SR A1A – Beaches	Route transition from SR 811 to CR 811
Hillsboro Canal		0.40 0.00	0.64 0.00	Bridge (northern terminus of CR 811)	
Palm Beach	Boca Raton	0.10	0.16	Northeast 2nd Avenue – Deerfield Beach	Interchange; southbound exit only
Palm Beach	Boca Raton	2.10	3.38	Palmetto Park Road (CR 798) to I-95	Former SR 798
Palm Beach	Boca Raton	2.90	4.67	SR 808 (Glades Road)	
Palm Beach	Boca Raton	4.60	7.40	Spanish River Boulevard	Former SR 800
Palm Beach	Boca Raton	5.20	8.37	SR 794 (Yamato Road)	
Palm Beach	Delray Beach	8.30	13.36	Linton Boulevard (CR 782)	Former SR 782
Palm Beach	Delray Beach	8.80	14.16	South 10th Street	Northern terminus of southern Dixie Highway segment
Palm Beach	Gap in route				
Palm Beach	West Palm Beach	0.00	0.00	45th Street (CR 702) to I-95	Southern terminus of CR 811 and northern Dixie Highway segment
Palm Beach	Riviera Beach	1.10	1.77	SR 710 west (Martin Luther King Jr. Boulevard)	Eastern terminus of SR 710
Palm Beach	Riviera Beach	2.10	3.38	SR 708 (Blue Heron Boulevard) to I-95	
Palm Beach	Lake Park–North Palm Beach line	4.10 0.000	6.60 0.000	SR 850 east / CR 809A west (Northlake Boulevard) to I-95 / US 1	Route transition from CR 811 to SR 811; western terminus of SR 850; eastern terminus of CR 809A (former SR 809A)
Palm Beach	Palm Beach Gardens	2.77	4.46	SR 786 (PGA Boulevard) to I-95 / Florida's Turnpike	Grade-separated interchange
Palm Beach	Palm Beach Gardens			I-95 south – West Palm Beach	Southbound direct flyover ramp only; other movements via SR 786
Palm Beach	Palm Beach Gardens–Jupiter line	5.469	8.802	Donald Ross Road to I-95	
Palm Beach	Jupiter	9.004	14.491	SR 706 (Indiantown Road) to I-95 / Florida's Turnpike / US 1	
Palm Beach	Jupiter	9.853– 10.072	15.857– 16.209	Pete Damon Memorial Bridge over Loxahatchee River	
Palm Beach	Jupiter	10.167	16.362	Riverside Drive to US 1 south	
Palm Beach	Jupiter	10.368	16.686	Old Dixie Highway	Road continues north to a dead-end
Palm Beach	Jupiter–Tequesta line	10.457	16.829	US 1 / CR 707 north (Beach Road)	Northern terminus of SR 811 and northern Dixie Highway segment; southern terminus of CR 707 (former SR 707)
1.000 mi = 1.609 km; 1.000 km = 0.621 mi: Incomplete access; Route transition

== County Road 811A ==
County Road 811A
- Location: Fort Lauderdale

Neither a bypass nor a spur, the former State Road 811A, now County Road 811A, is a seven-mile-long stretch of North Andrews Avenue in Fort Lauderdale. The southern terminus is an intersection with Sunrise Boulevard (SR 838) and the northern terminus is an intersection with Atlantic Boulevard (SR 814). It provides an alternative north–south commuter route whenever I-95 is clogged with a traffic jam.

With Broward Boulevard (SR 842), Andrews Avenue provides a baseline from which all Fort Lauderdale addresses are determined. Just west of the northern terminus of CR 811A is the Pompano Park Raceway, the only harness racing track in southern Florida. Within nine six blocks of the southern terminus are Fort Lauderdale and Broward County governments, all of which within a block of the Fort Lauderdale Museum of Discovery and Art and a campus of Broward Community College.

State Road 811A does not intersect with its "parent"; however, in the 1960s, State Road 811 extended along Andrews Avenue southward from SR 838 to US 1. Had SR 811A been in existence at that time, the two roads would have branched out from Sunrise Boulevard and North Andrews Avenue, but no road map - commercial or governmental - has ever indicated the concurrent existence of SR 811A and the SR 811 extension.

=== Major intersections ===
The entire route is in Broward County.

Location	mi	km	Destinations	Notes
Fort Lauderdale	0.0	0.0	SR 838 (Sunrise Boulevard)	Road continues south without designation
Wilton Manors–Oakland Park line	2.1	3.4	SR 816 (Oakland Park Boulevard)	
Oakland Park	3.6	5.8	SR 870 (Commercial Boulevard)	
Oakland Park	4.4	7.1	I-95 south – Miami	Southbound exit only; other movements can be made via CR 840 (I-95 exit 33)
Fort Lauderdale	4.7	7.6	Cypress Creek Road (CR 840)	
Pompano Beach	6.9	11.1	SR 814 (Atlantic Boulevard)	Road continues north without designation
1.000 mi = 1.609 km; 1.000 km = 0.621 mi: Incomplete access
