= Florida State Road 729 =

State highway in Florida, United States

State Road 729
- State Market Road

Route information
- Maintained by FDOT
- Length: 2.290 mi (3.685 km)
- Existed: May 1973–present

Major junctions
- South end: US 98 / US 441 / SR 15 in Pahokee
- North end: US 98 / US 441 / SR 15 in Pahokee

Location
- Country: United States
- State: Florida
- Counties: Palm Beach

Highway system
- Florida State Highway System; Interstate; US; State; Former; Pre‑1945; Toll; Scenic
← SR 727	→ SR 732

State Road 729 (SR 729), locally known as State Market Road, is a 2.290-mile-long (3.685 km) north–south road bypassing the city of Pahokee on the southeastern shore of Lake Okeechobee. SR 729 is entirely within the city limits of Pahokee and serves as a designated truck bypass for U.S. Routes 98 and 441 (US 98/US 441).

== Route description ==
As motorists driving northbound on US 98/US 441/SR 15 veer to the west onto East Seventh Street and north onto Lake Avenue to go into downtown Pahokee, SR 729 continues alongside Florida East Coast Railroad tracks to the northeast and north through the outskirt farmlands of Pahokee, to reconnect with US 98/441/SR 15, which continues along the shore of Lake Okeechobee as Everglades Street.

== History ==
The route was originally signed as State Road 15A.

== Major intersections ==
The entire route is in Pahokee, Palm Beach County.

mi	km	Destinations	Notes
0.000	0.000	US 98 / US 441 / SR 15 (South Lake Avenue) – Pahokee	
0.028	0.045	CR 717 east (Muck City Road)	Western terminus of CR 717; former SR 717
2.290	3.685	US 98 / US 441 / SR 15 – Canal Point, Okeechobee	
1.000 mi = 1.609 km; 1.000 km = 0.621 mi
