= Kings Point (film) =

- Directed by: Sari Gilman
- Produced by: Sari Gilman; Jedd and Todd Wider
- Cinematography: Daniel B. Gold; Gabriel Miller; Toby Oppenheimer
- Edited by: Jeffrey Friedman
- Music by: Miriam Cutler
- Distributed by: ShortsHD; HBO; Women Make Movies
- Release date: October 12, 2012 (USA)
- Running time: 31 minutes
- Language: English

Kings Point is a 2012 short documentary film about five seniors living in a retirement resort in Kings Point, Florida, directed by Sari Gilman. The film was nominated for the 2013 Academy Award for Best Documentary (Short Subject).

After being nominated for an Academy Award the film was released along with all the other 15 Oscar-nominated short films in theaters by ShortsHD.
