= Interstate 95 in Florida =

Highway in Florida

Interstate 95
- I-95 highlighted in red

Route information
- Maintained by FDOT
- Length: 382.15 mi (615.01 km)
- Existed: 1957–present
- History: Completed in December 19, 1987
- NHS: Entire route

Major junctions
- South end: US 1 / SR 913 in Miami
- US 41 in Miami; I-395 / SR 836 in Miami; I-195 / SR 112 in Miami; Florida's Turnpike / US 441 / SR 9 / SR 826 in Miami Gardens; I-595 in Fort Lauderdale; SR 528 in Cocoa; I-4 / SR 400 in Daytona Beach; Future I-795 / SR 9B in Jacksonville; I-295 in Jacksonville; I-10 in Jacksonville
- North end: I-95 in Kingsland, GA

Location
- Country: United States
- State: Florida
- Counties: Miami-Dade, Broward, Palm Beach, Martin, St. Lucie, Indian River, Brevard, Volusia, Flagler, St. Johns, Duval, Nassau

Highway system
- Interstate Highway System; Main; Auxiliary; Suffixed; Business; Future; Florida State Highway System; Interstate; US; State; Former; Pre‑1945; Toll; Scenic
← SR 94	→ SR 95
← SR 9	SR 9A	→ SR 9B

Interstate 95 (I-95) is the main Interstate Highway of Florida's Atlantic Coast. It begins at a partial interchange with US Highway 1 (US 1) just south of downtown Miami and heads north through Jacksonville, and to the Georgia state line at the St. Marys River near Becker. The route also passes through the cities of Fort Lauderdale, West Palm Beach, Port St. Lucie, Titusville, and Daytona Beach.

I-95 runs for 382 miles (615 km), making Florida's portion the longest of any state the Interstate passes through. The first 12.848 miles (20.677 km), from exits 1 to 12, has an internal unsigned designation as State Road 9A (SR 9A), while the remainder of the route up to the Georgia state line is the unsigned portion of SR 9.

== Route description ==
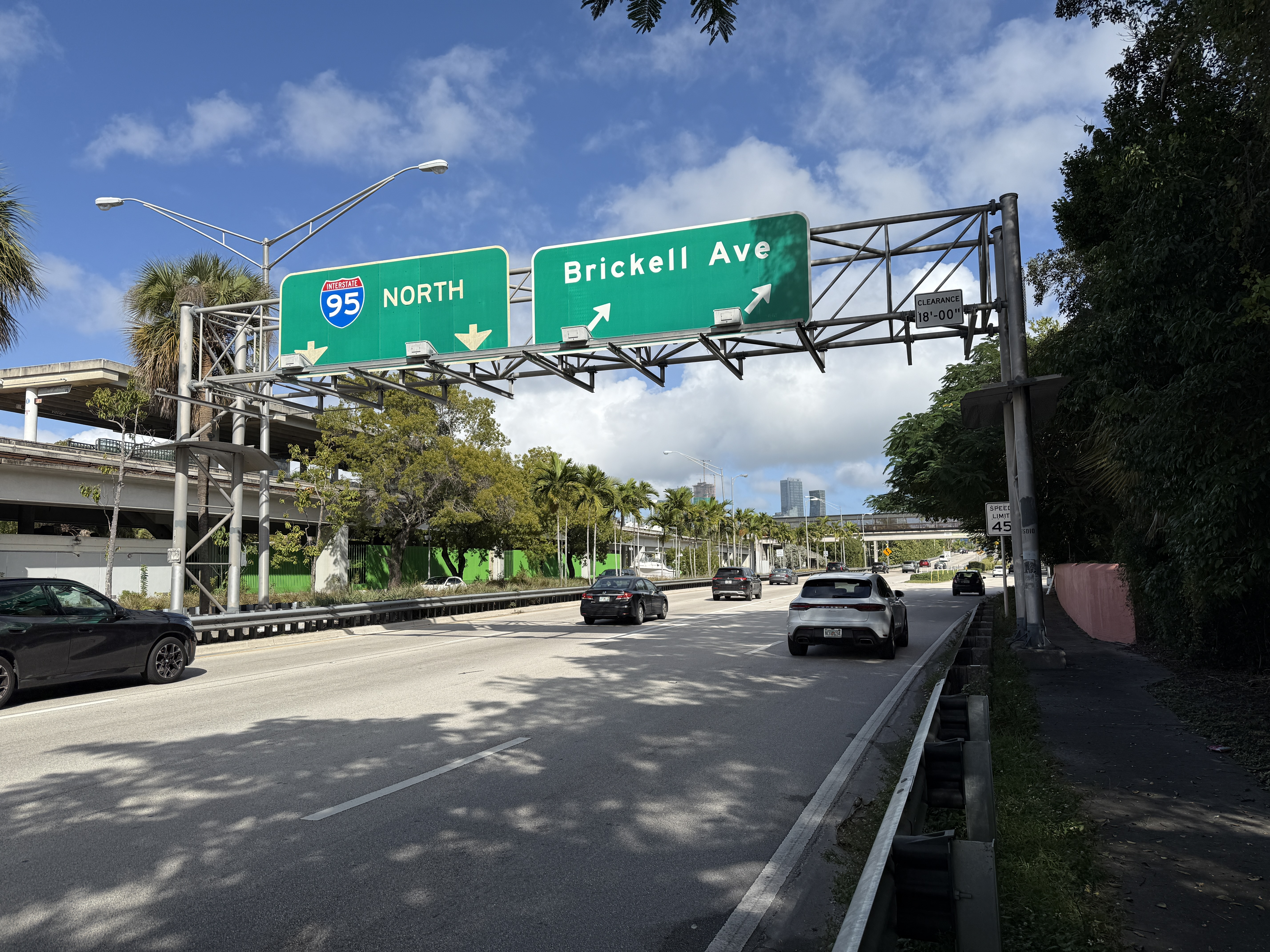
The beginning of northbound I-95 at US 1 in Miami

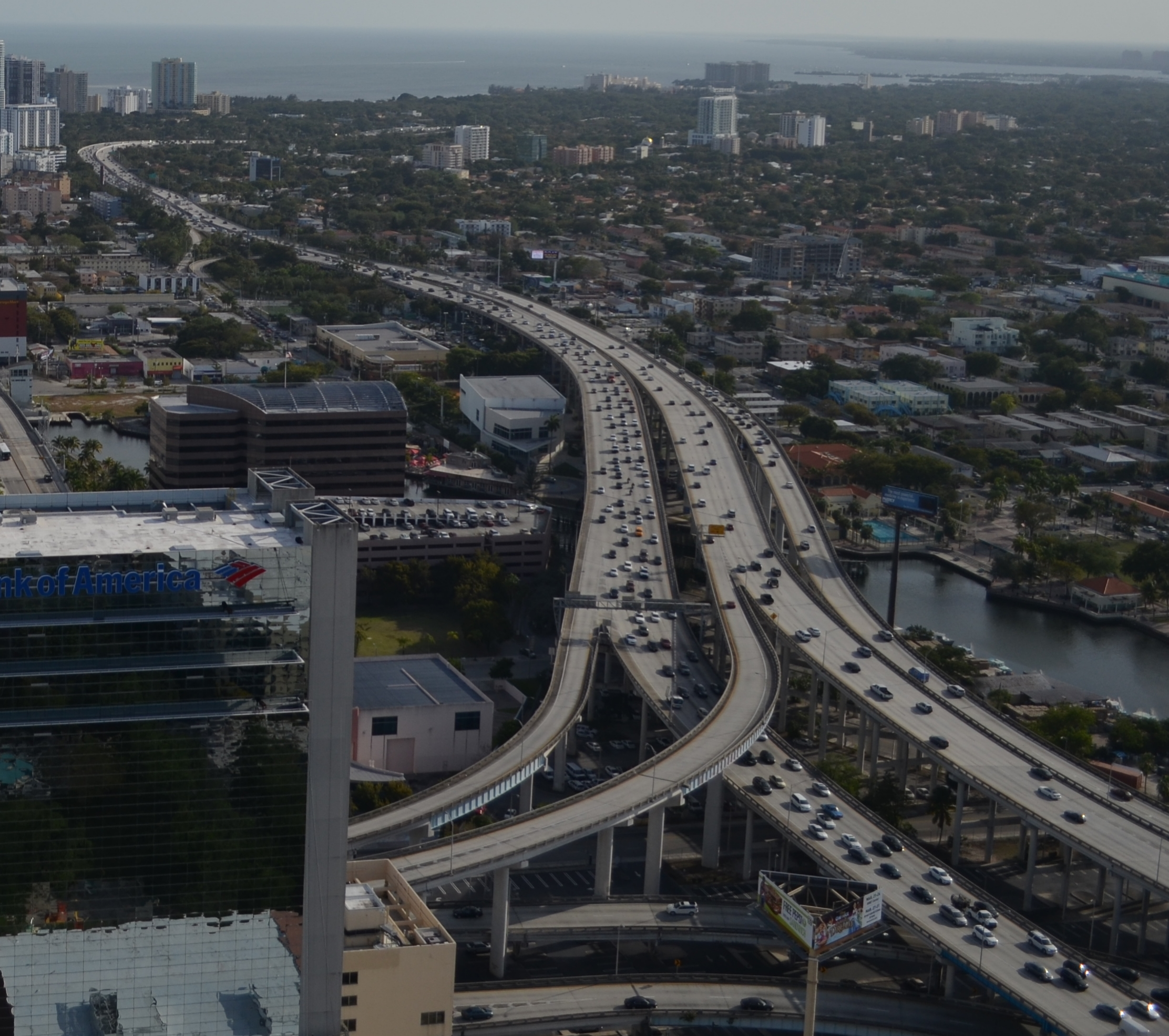
The southern terminus of I-95 in Greater Downtown Miami. In the background, the roadway lowers to surface level at which point it merges with US 1.

I-95 begins its northward journey at US 1 near 32nd Road in southern Miami, adjacent to the Vizcaya Metrorail station. It quickly intersects the Rickenbacker Causeway via the short unsigned SR 913 and then heads north into downtown. The short SR 970 freeway, mostly unsigned, distributes traffic to several downtown streets. On the north side of downtown, at the Midtown Interchange, I-395 heads east to the MacArthur Causeway, and the tolled SR 836 heads west to Miami International Airport. Throughout Miami-Dade County, I-95 is designated the North–South Expressway according to some maps.

After crossing I-395 and SR 836, I-95 begins to head north roughly along the alignment of Northwest 6th Avenue, lying one block east of Northwest 7th Avenue (US 441/SR 7). Just north of 36th Street (US 27/SR 25), at what has been called the 36th Street Interchange, I-95 crosses I-195, which goes east over the Julia Tuttle Causeway to Miami Beach, and SR 112, a toll road west to the airport. A two-way express lane roadway in the median begins at I-195 and SR 112, formed by ramps to and from SR 112. I-95 continues north, crossing and interchanging with many surface roads, most of which are state roads, before reaching the Golden Glades Interchange.

The complicated Golden Glades Interchange provides access between I-95 and two other freeways—the original section of Florida's Turnpike (SR 91), since bypassed by the Homestead Extension (SR 821), and the Palmetto Expressway (SR 826). Ramps are also provided to and from several surface streets—SR 826 east on 167th Street to Sunny Isles Beach, US 441 (SR 7) south on Northwest 7th Avenue and north on Northwest 2nd Avenue, and SR 9 southwest on a limited-access roadway to Northwest 27th Avenue. At the Golden Glades Interchange, SR 9 merges with I-95, and I-95 is unsigned as SR 9 for the remainder of its length up to the Georgia state line. Additionally, I-95 north to West Palm Beach, as well as SR 9 southwest to 27th Avenue, runs parallel to the Seaboard–All Florida Railway, used by CSX Transportation for cargo and freight, Tri-Rail for commuter rail, and Amtrak's Silver Star (temporarily replaced by the Floridian) and Silver Meteor lines for intercity rail.

North of Miami, I-95 continues on to Fort Lauderdale, where it interchanges with I-595, providing access to Fort Lauderdale–Hollywood International Airport and Port Everglades to the east, and Broward County's western suburbs as well as I-75 northbound (via Alligator Alley) across the peninsula to the Gulf Coast to the west. In West Palm Beach, I-95 provides direct access to President Donald J. Trump International Airport as well as downtown West Palm Beach and Palm Beach Island via SR 704 (Okeechobee Boulevard). North of West Palm Beach, I-95 and the Florida's Turnpike literally run right next to each other for 17 miles (27 km) between Donald Ross Road in Jupiter and County Road 713 (CR 713) in Palm City. After the interchange with CR 713, I-95 crosses over the turnpike in an extreme detour through the western reaches of Martin County before heading north toward St. Lucie County. Providing access to the western portions of Port St. Lucie via five interchanges, I-95 eventually crosses over the turnpike a final time just north of the Midway Road (CR 712) interchange. Both freeways eventually go separate ways north of Fort Pierce; I-95 continues directly along the coast; Florida's Turnpike turns west toward Orlando.

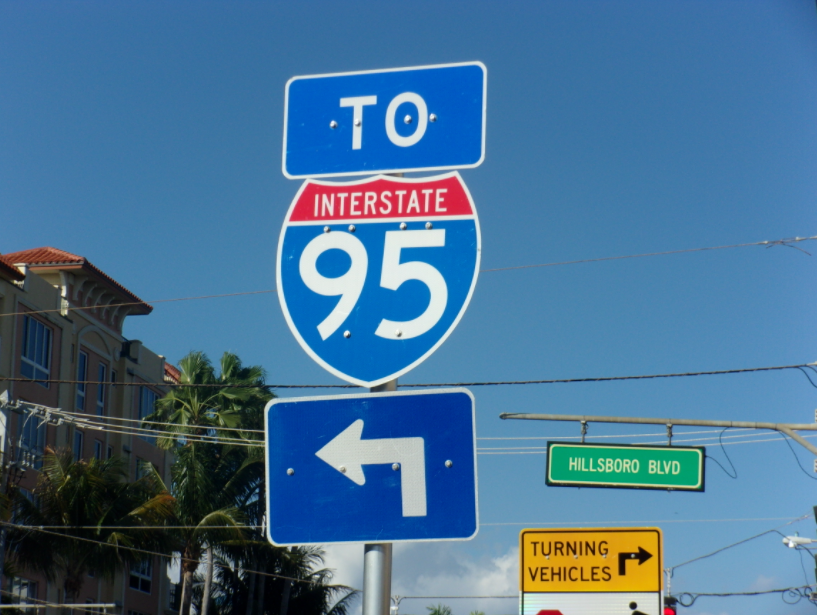
A sign for I-95 along SR A1A in Deerfield Beach

Just before the interchange with SR 70 (providing access to the turnpike), the highway widens from three to five lanes in each direction; after the interchange with SR 70, I-95 narrows to four lanes in each direction. I-95 further narrows to three lanes in each direction after its interchange with SR 614. The road soon enters Indian River County and the next major exit is with SR 60 providing access to Vero Beach. The highway soon enters Brevard County and the Space Coast of Florida, continuing past Melbourne, Viera, and Cocoa. The next major junction is SR 528 with access to Cocoa Beach, and Cape Canaveral eastbound and tolled access to Orlando to the west. Continuing north past Titusville, I-95 enters Volusia County and the city of Daytona Beach shortly afterward, where it meets with the eastern terminus of I-4. The highway passes through Flagler and St. Johns counties before it enters Duval County and the city of Jacksonville.

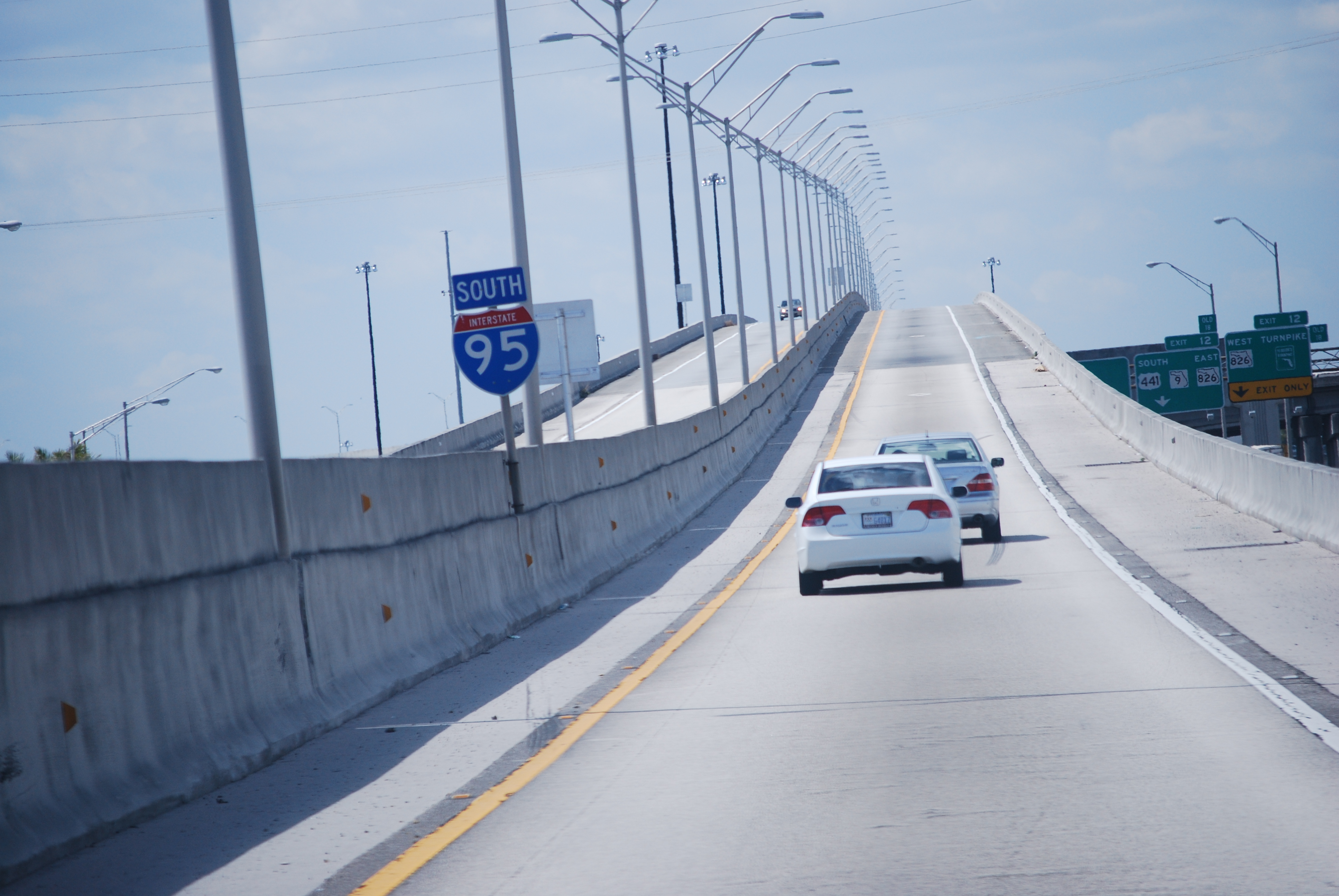
I-95's southbound HOV lane over the Golden Glades Interchange heading toward Miami

About five miles (8.0 km) north of the St. Johns–Duval county border, I-95 intersects the I-295 beltway at its southern end 14 miles (23 km) south of central Jacksonville, with I-95 continuing north. The Interstate passes through the heart of Jacksonville, crossing the Fuller Warren Bridge over the St. Johns River, which was rebuilt from its original drawbridge incarnation in 2002. About a mile (1.6 km) north of the bridge, at exit 351B, it intersects with the national eastern terminus of I-10, with the interchange's redesign completed in September 2010. From here to exit 353B, it is concurrent with US 17 and its unsigned designation SR 15. The stretch from here in Downtown Jacksonville south past the southern interchange with the Jacksonville Beltway, I-295, can be very congested during morning and evening rush hours, with traffic often grinding to a halt. Well over 100,000 cars use this section per day, with even higher traffic counts in some areas. I-95 intersects I-295 again at exit 362, 11 miles (18 km) north of Downtown Jacksonville. Just north of the northern I-295 interchange, I-95 provides access to Jacksonville International Airport. From this point, I-95 continues north toward Nassau County with an exit for SR A1A and then into Georgia, just north of milemarker 380.

=== Express lanes ===
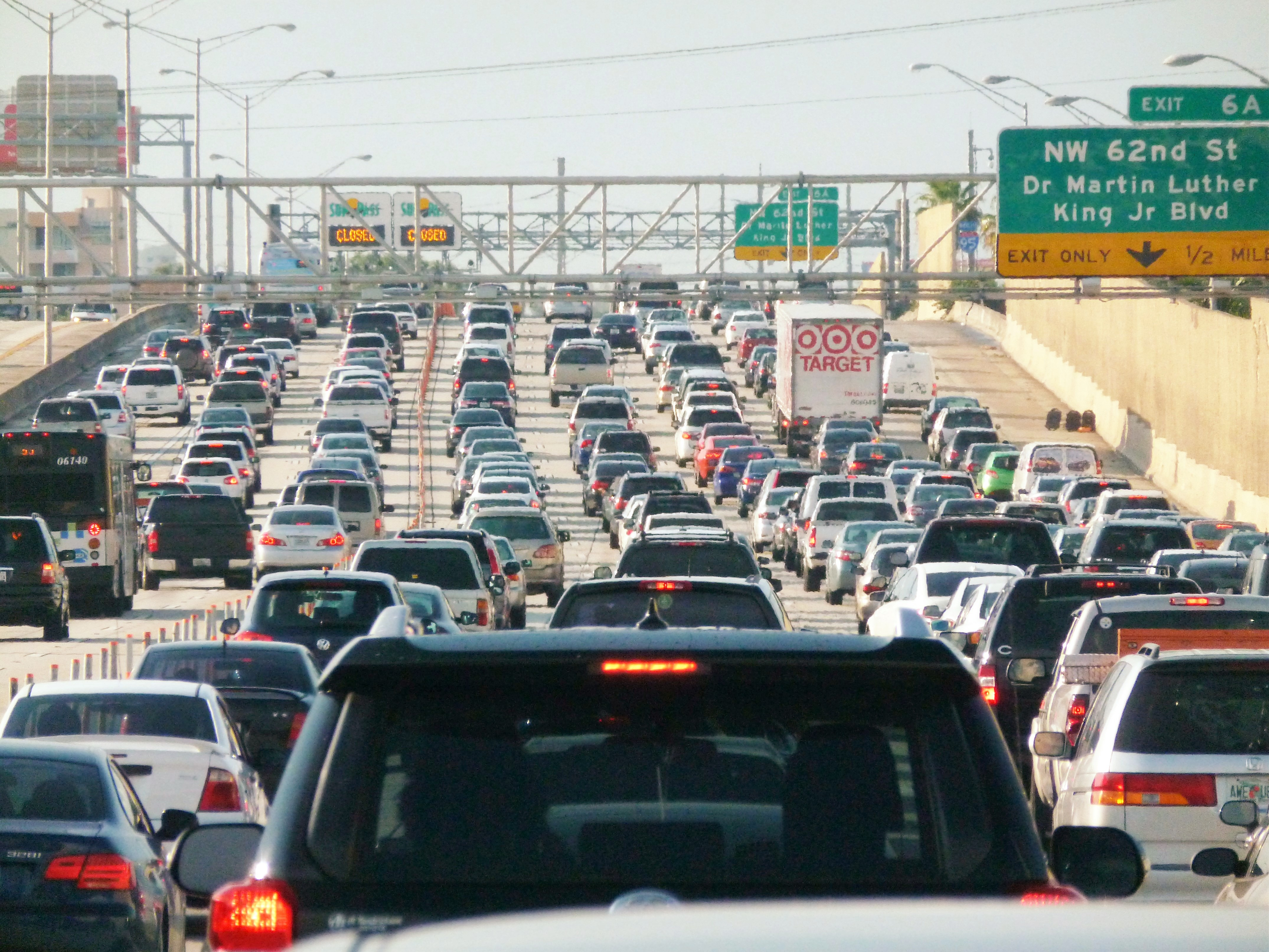
During rush hour, even the variable toll express lanes can become congested.

The current high-occupancy vehicle (HOV) lanes in both directions between I-395 in Miami and Broward Boulevard (SR 842) in Fort Lauderdale have been converted to high-occupancy toll (HOT), with two lanes in each direction. Prices vary based on congestion and peak hours and tolls are collected electronically, while registered travelers with three or more passengers and hybrid vehicles can drive the toll lanes for free. Both HOT lanes have been completed in both directions from I-395 to Broward Boulevard (including toll gantries).

== History ==
I-95 was initially signed in 1959, and the first section to be opened to traffic was in Jacksonville in 1960. A year later, a short section just north of the current I-195 in Miami opened. The Miami News in 1956 touted the construction of what would become I-95 in Miami as a "slum clearance program". Most of the construction was focused between Jacksonville and Daytona Beach in the early 1960s. Construction of the Fuller Warren Bridge cut off the historically Black Jacksonville neighborhood called Brooklyn. At the end of the decade, the highway was complete from US 17, just south of the Georgia state line to I-4 in Daytona Beach (Georgia had not completed their portion of I-95 at the time of Florida's completion). The segment from Fort Lauderdale to Miami was complete by 1970. By 1976, most of the highway was complete from the Georgia state line to Fort Pierce as well as Palm Beach Gardens to Miami.

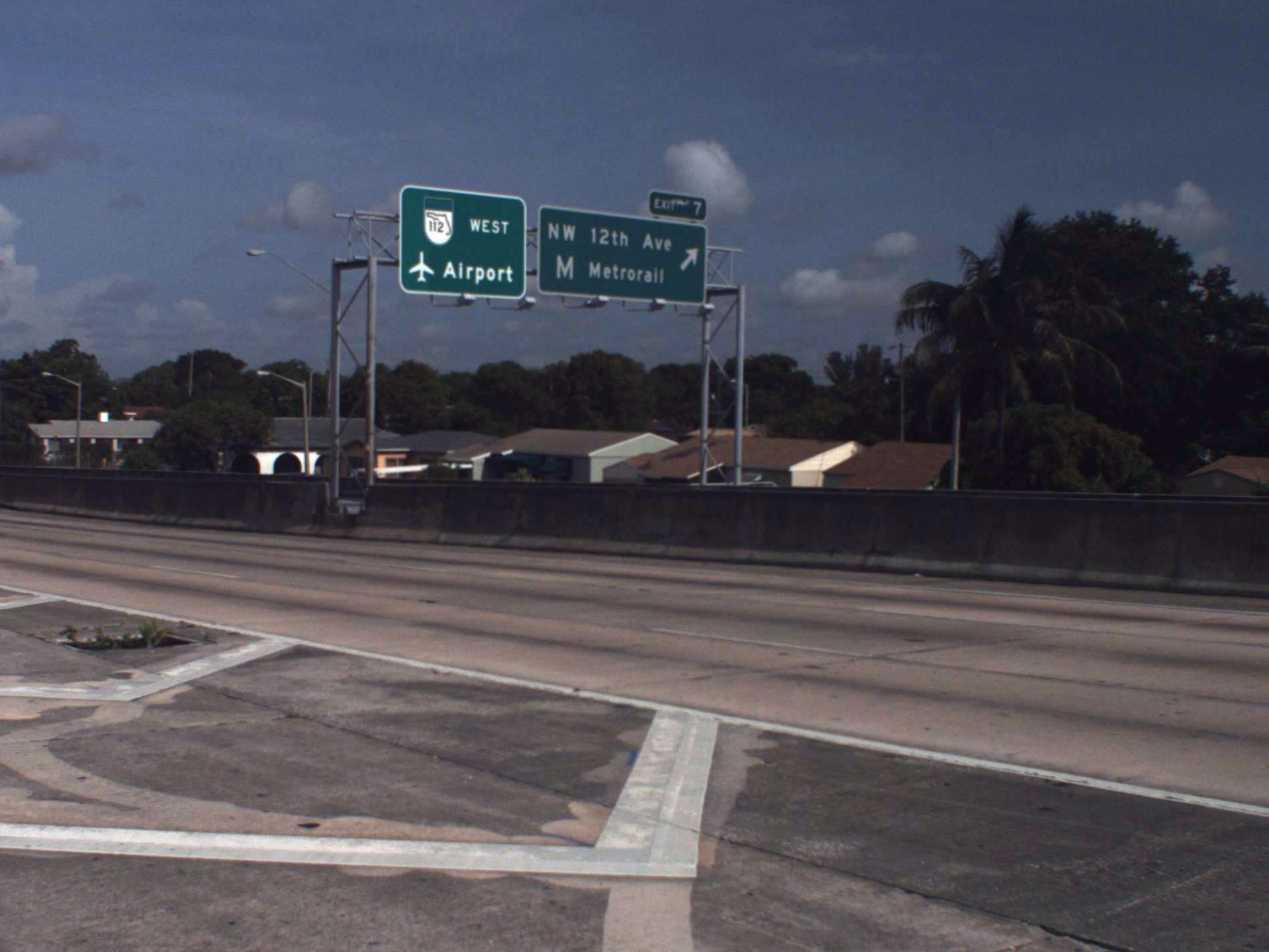
Remnant of sequential exit numbering, on the ramp from the southbound express lanes to SR 112 west

In 2002, I-95, along with most of Florida's Interstates, switched over from a sequential exit numbering system to a mileage-based exit numbering system.

=== Missing Treasure Coast Link ===
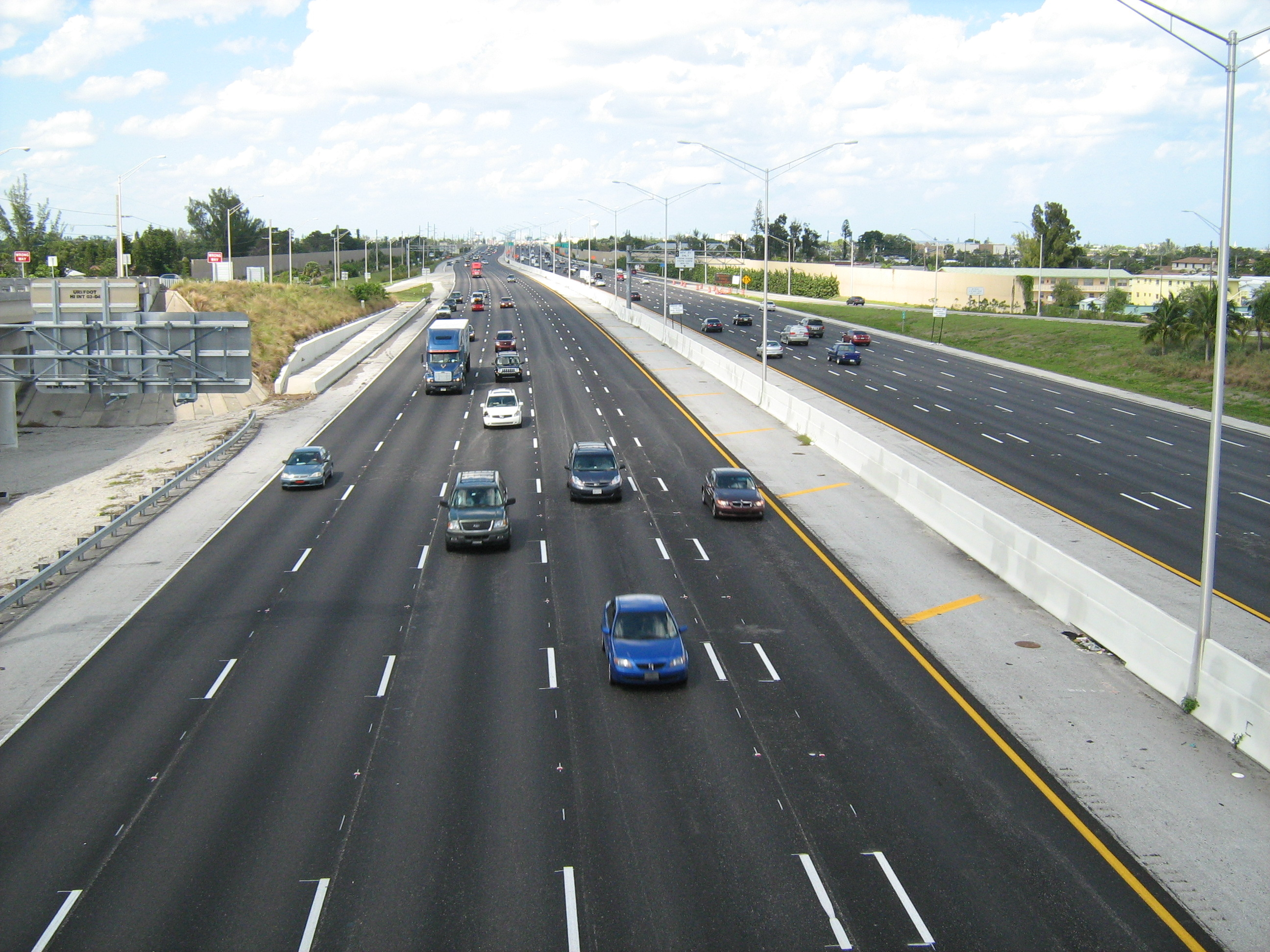
I-95 southbound lanes at the Lantana Road interchange, with northbound lanes to the right

The Bureau of Public Roads approved an I-95 alignment that used 41 miles (66 km) of Florida's Turnpike from PGA Boulevard (SR 786) in Palm Beach Gardens north to SR 70 in Fort Pierce in the 1950s. In the mid-1960s, the State Road Department authorized traffic counts be conducted to determine if the separation of I-95 from the turnpike was feasible, with arguments that using a concurrent alignment was costing Florida money for federal highway funding, but not without the concern of losing toll revenue. I-95 was given a separate alignment from Florida's Turnpike in 1973.

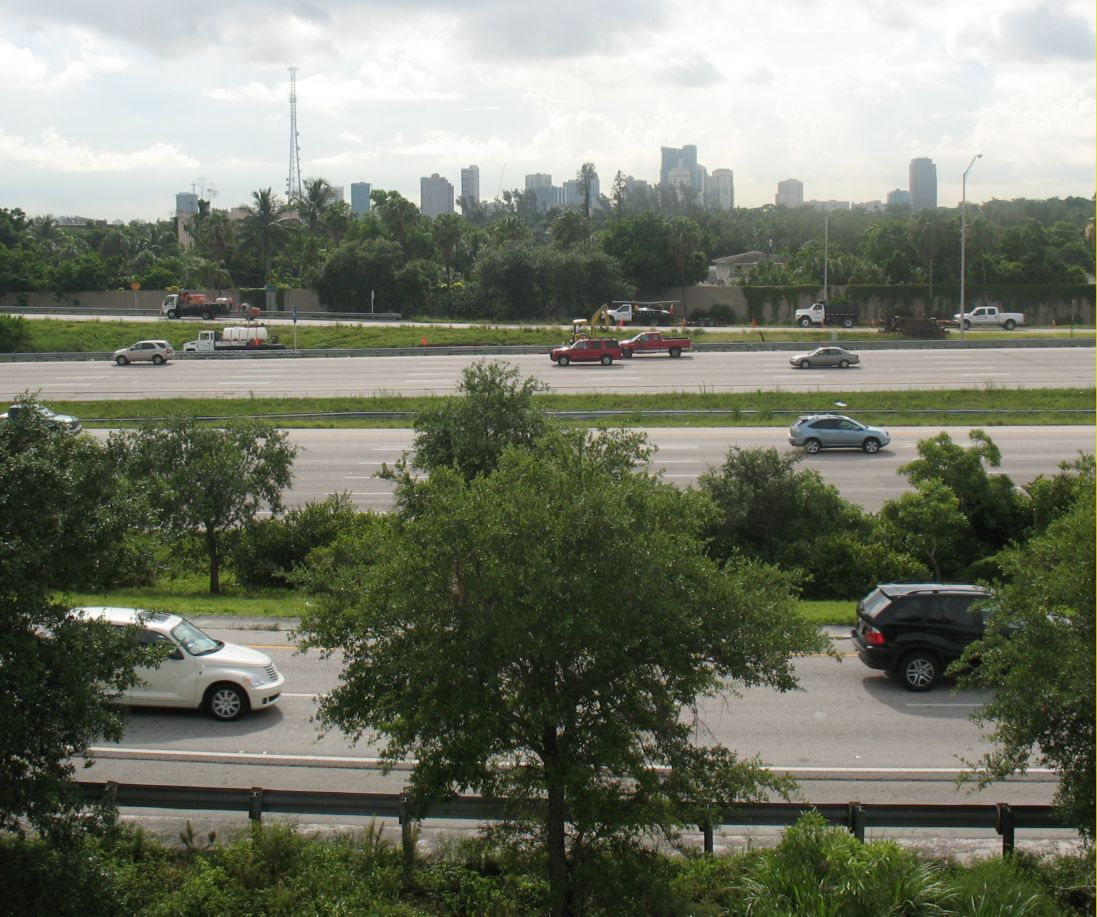
I-95 as it goes through Fort Lauderdale

Over time, the Interstate adopted a separate route closer to US 1, running parallel with the turnpike between Stuart and Palm Beach Gardens, and was originally scheduled to be completed in 1972. However, resistance by Martin County officials due to environmental and unwanted growth concerns delayed the highway's completion for 15 years, requiring those who wanted to travel through the Treasure Coast to take either the slower US 1 or the tolled turnpike. This section opened to traffic on December 19, 1987, with I-95 running uninterrupted from Miami to the Georgia state line.

== Exit list ==
=== Mainline ===
County	Location	mi	km	Old exit	New exit	Destinations	Notes
Miami-Dade	Miami	0.000	0.000	—	—	US 1 south (South Dixie Highway) – Key West	Southern terminus of I-95; to Dadeland Mall
Miami-Dade	Miami	0.469	0.755	1	1A	SR 913 (Rickenbacker Causeway / Southwest 26th Road) – Key Biscayne	Southbound exit and northbound entrance; to Vizcaya, Miami Seaquarium, Miami Marine Stadium, MAST Academy, Virginia Key Beach Park, Crandon Park and Bill Baggs Cape Florida State Park
Miami-Dade	Miami	1.558	2.507	2	1B	US 41 (Southwest 8th–7th Streets) to Brickell Avenue	
Miami-Dade	Miami	2.026	3.261	3	2A	US 1 (Biscayne Boulevard via SR 970 east) – Downtown Miami	Shared ramp with exit 2C on I-95 south; to Bayside, PAC and Kaseya Center
Miami-Dade	Miami	2.026	3.261	3A	2C	Miami Avenue – Downtown	No northbound exit
Miami-Dade	Miami	2.3– 2.7	3.7– 4.3	4 5A	2B 3B	SR 925 (Northwest 2nd and 8th Streets) – Port of Miami, LoanDepot Park, Arena	Signed as 2B / 2nd Street (northbound) and 3B / 8th Street (southbound)
Miami-Dade	Miami	3.186	5.127	5	2D	I-395 east – PortMiami, Miami Beach	Midtown Interchange; PortMiami access via tunnel; to Bayside, PAC, Kaseya Center, Science Museum, Planetarium, MacArthur Causeway, Jungle Island, Miami Children's Museum and Miami Seaplane Base; exit 1 on I-395
Miami-Dade	Miami	3.186	5.127	6	3A	SR 836 west (Dolphin Expressway) – Miami International Airport, UM / Jackson VA Hospitals	To Miami International Mall, Dolphin Mall, LoanDepot Park, and Nu Stadium
Miami-Dade	Miami	4.3	6.9	—	—	Express Lanes	Southern terminus of express lanes
Miami-Dade	Miami	4.844	7.796	7	4	I-195 east / SR 112 west (Airport Expressway) – Miami Beach, Miami International Airport	Signed as exits 4A (east) and 4B (west) northbound; exit 1 on I-195; to US 27 and Julia Tuttle Causeway
Miami-Dade	Miami	6.227	10.021	8	6A	Northwest 62nd Street (Dr. Martin Luther King Jr. Boulevard)	
Miami-Dade	Miami	6.608	10.635	9A	6B	Northwest 69th Street	Southbound exit and northbound entrance
Miami-Dade	West Little River	7.329	11.795	9	7	SR 934 (Northwest 79th / 81st Streets)	
Miami-Dade	Pinewood	8.285	13.333	10	8A	Northwest 95th Street (Rev. Dr. A. Jackson Jr. Boulevard)	
Miami-Dade		8.794	14.153	11	8B	SR 932 (Northwest 103rd Street)	
Miami-Dade		9.799	15.770	12	9	SR 924 (Northwest 119th Street)	No southbound exit; access to Barry University
Miami-Dade	North Miami	10.176	16.377	13	10A	SR 922 (Northwest 125th Street) – North Miami, Bal Harbour	
Miami-Dade	North Miami	10.854	17.468	14	10B	SR 916 (Northwest 135th Street / Opa-Locka Boulevard)	
Miami-Dade	Golden Glades	11.827	19.034	15	11	Northwest 151st Street	Northbound exit and southbound entrance
Miami-Dade	Golden Glades			—	—	Express Lanes	Southbound exit and northbound entrance
Miami-Dade	Golden Glades	12.4	20.0	16	12A	Florida's Turnpike / SR 826 west (Palmetto Expressway) to Florida's Turnpike Extension	Golden Glades Interchange; southbound exit via exit 12; to Jackson North Medical Center
Miami-Dade	Golden Glades	12.848	20.677	17	12B	SR 826 east – North Miami Beach	Golden Glades Interchange; southbound exit via exit 12; to Jackson North Medical Center
Miami-Dade	Golden Glades	12.848	20.677	18	12	US 441 south / SR 9 south	Southern end of SR 9 concurrency; northern end of SR 9A; southbound exit and northbound entrance
Miami-Dade	Golden Glades	13.1	21.1	18	12C	US 441 north	Northbound exit and southbound entrance; Golden Glades Interchange
Miami-Dade	North Miami Beach	13.9	22.4	—	—	Express Lanes	Northbound exit and southbound entrance
Miami-Dade	North Miami Beach	14.377	23.138	19	14	SR 860 (Miami Gardens Drive)	Unsigned access to south SR 915 (Northeast 6th Avenue)
Miami-Dade	North Miami Beach			—	—	Express Lanes	Southbound exit and northbound entrance
Miami-Dade	Ives Estates–Ojus line	16.574	26.673	20	16	Northeast 203rd Street / Ives Dairy Road (CR 854)	To Aventura Mall, Hard Rock Stadium, Brightline, and HCA Florida Aventura Hospital
Broward	Hallandale Beach–Pembroke Park line	18.025	29.008	21	18	SR 858 (Hallandale Beach Boulevard)	To Gulfstream Park
Broward	Hallandale Beach–Pembroke Park line			—	—	Express Lanes	Northbound exit and southbound entrance
Broward	Hallandale Beach–Pembroke Park– Hollywood tripoint	18.794	30.246	22	19	SR 824 (Pembroke Road)	To Big Easy Casino
Broward	Hollywood	19.816	31.891	23	20	SR 820 (Hollywood Boulevard)	To Pembroke Lakes Mall, Memorial Regional Hospital, Joe DiMaggio Children's Hospital, Hollywood Beach Broadwalk, ArtsPark at Young Circle, Tri-Rail/Amtrak station
Broward	Hollywood	21.384	34.414	24	21	SR 822 (Sheridan Street)	To Tri-Rail Park-Ride, Topeekeegee Yugnee Park
Broward	Hollywood–Dania Beach line	22.416	36.075	25	22	SR 848 (Stirling Road)	To Dr. Von D. Mizell-Eula Johnson State Park
Broward	Hollywood–Dania Beach line			—	—	Express Lanes	Southbound exit and northbound entrance
Broward	Dania Beach–Fort Lauderdale line	23.433	37.712	26	23	SR 818 (Griffin Road) – Fort Lauderdale-Hollywood International Airport	
Broward	Fort Lauderdale–Hollywood– Dania Beach tripoint	24.803	39.917	26A	24 26	I-595 (Port Everglades Expressway / SR 862) to Florida's Turnpike / I-75 / SR 869 – Port Everglades, Fort Lauderdale-Hollywood International Airport	Rainbow Interchange; signed with/as exit 26 southbound; exits 10A-B on I-595
Broward	Fort Lauderdale	25.245	40.628	27	25	SR 84 (Marina Mile Boulevard)	
Broward	Fort Lauderdale	25.463	40.979	South Fork New River Bridge			
Broward	Fort Lauderdale	26.500	42.648	28	26	SR 736 (Davie Boulevard)	Former exit 26C-D southbound
Broward	Fort Lauderdale			—	—	Express Lanes	Northern terminus of express lanes
Broward	Fort Lauderdale	27.531	44.307	29	27	SR 842 (Broward Boulevard) – Downtown Fort Lauderdale	To Broward Mall, Brightline, and HCA Florida Plantation Emergency
Broward	Fort Lauderdale			—	27	Amtrak/Tri-Rail Park-Ride	Left exit now restricted to express lanes as of 2026; Now signed to Exit 27
Broward	Fort Lauderdale	28.553	45.952	30	29	SR 838 (Sunrise Boulevard)	Signed as exits 29A (east) and 29B (west) northbound; to Galleria Fort Lauderdale, Sawgrass Mills, Hugh Taylor Birch State Park, and Historic Bonnet House
Broward	Oakland Park	30.713	49.428	—	31	SR 816 (Oakland Park Boulevard)	Signed as exits 31A (east) and 31B (west) northbound
Broward	Oakland Park	32.339	52.045	—	32	SR 870 (Commercial Boulevard)	To Holy Cross Hospital and Chase Stadium
Broward	Oakland Park	33.553	53.998	—	33	Cypress Creek Road (CR 840)	Signed as exits 33A (east) and 33B (west) northbound
Broward	Pompano Beach	35.635	57.349	34	36	SR 814 (Atlantic Boulevard)	To Coral Square
Broward	Pompano Beach	37.694	60.663	35	38	Copans Road	To Pompano Citi Centre
Broward	Pompano Beach–Deerfield Beach line	38.840	62.507	36	39	SR 834 (Sample Road)	To Butterfly World and Tradewinds and Atlantic Railroad
Broward	Deerfield Beach	40.922	65.858	36C	41	SR 869 (Southwest 10th Street) to SR 869 / I-75	Future extension of Sawgrass Expressway to I-95 via SW 10th Street Connector to start construction late 2024; exit 41 likely to be split into two separate A and B exits
Broward	Deerfield Beach	41.883	67.404	37	42	SR 810 (Hillsboro Boulevard)	Signed as exits 42A (east) and 42B (west) northbound (formerly exits 37A-B)
Palm Beach	Boca Raton	44.130	71.020	38	44	Palmetto Park Road (CR 798)	To Sugar Sand Park, and Brightline
Palm Beach	Boca Raton	45.361	73.001	39	45	SR 808 (Glades Road)	Reconstructed from an A4 partial cloverleaf interchange into a diverging diamond interchange which opened on January 30, 2023, to Boca Raton Regional Hospital, Town Center Mall, Florida Atlantic University and Flagler Credit Union Stadium
Palm Beach	Boca Raton	46.9	75.5	—	48A	SR 800 (Spanish River Boulevard) / FAU Boulevard	Opened May 1, 2018; to Florida Atlantic University, and Flagler Credit Union Stadium
Palm Beach	Boca Raton	47.818	76.956	40	48B	SR 794 (Yamato Road)	Formerly signed as exits 48A (east) and 48B (west) northbound
Palm Beach	Boca Raton	49.677	79.947	40C	50	Congress Avenue (CR 807)	
Palm Beach	Delray Beach	50.969	82.027	41	51	Linton Boulevard (CR 782)	
Palm Beach	Delray Beach	52.509	84.505	42	52	SR 806 (Atlantic Avenue)	
Palm Beach	Boynton Beach	56.344	90.677	43	56	Woolbright Road (CR 792)	
Palm Beach	Boynton Beach	57.339	92.278	44	57	SR 804 (Boynton Beach Boulevard)	To Boynton Beach Mall
Palm Beach	Boynton Beach	58.853	94.715	44C	59	Gateway Boulevard	
Palm Beach	Lantana	60.343	97.113	45	60	Hypoluxo Road	
Palm Beach	Lantana	61.377	98.777	46	61	Lantana Road (CR 812)	To HCA Florida JFK Hospital
Palm Beach	Lake Worth Beach	62.868	101.176	47	63	6th Avenue South	
Palm Beach	Lake Worth Beach	64.178	103.284	48	64	10th Avenue North	
Palm Beach	West Palm Beach	66.087	106.357	49	66	SR 882 (Forest Hill Boulevard)	To The Mall at Wellington Green
Palm Beach	West Palm Beach	67.539	108.693	50	68	US 98 / SR 80 (Southern Boulevard)	To Palm Beach Zoo, The Main Street at Tuttle Royale and South Florida Science Museum
Palm Beach	West Palm Beach	68.558	110.333	51	69	Belvedere Road – President Donald J. Trump International Airport	Signed as exits 69A (Belvedere Road) and 69B (Airport) southbound
Palm Beach	West Palm Beach	69.760	112.268	52	70	SR 704 (Okeechobee Boulevard) – Downtown West Palm Beach	To Rosemary Square, Whitehall (Henry M. Flagler House), Norton Museum of Art, Kravis Center for the Performing Arts, Palm Beach Atlantic University, Palm Beach County Convention Center, Brightline, and Tri-Rail
Palm Beach	West Palm Beach	71.015	114.288	53	71	Palm Beach Lakes Boulevard (CR 716)	To Good Samaritan Medical Center
Palm Beach	West Palm Beach	73.799	118.768	54	74	45th Street (CR 702)	
Palm Beach	Riviera Beach	75.549	121.584	55	76	SR 708 (Blue Heron Boulevard)	
Palm Beach	Palm Beach Gardens	77.307	124.414	56	77	Northlake Boulevard (CR 809A)	
Palm Beach	Palm Beach Gardens	79.503	127.948	57	79	SR 786 (PGA Boulevard)	Signed as exits 79A (east) and 79B (west) northbound; to The Gardens Mall, Legacy Place and Downtown Palm Beach Gardens
Palm Beach	Palm Beach Gardens	79.904	128.593	57C	79C	Military Trail south (CR 809)	Southbound exit and northbound entrance
Palm Beach	Palm Beach Gardens			—	81	Central Boulevard	Proposed interchange
Palm Beach	Palm Beach Gardens–Jupiter line	82.909	133.429	58	83	Donald Ross Road	
Palm Beach	Jupiter	86.704	139.537	59	87	SR 706 (Indiantown Road) to Florida's Turnpike – Okeechobee, Jupiter, Orlando, West Palm Beach	Signed as exits 87A (east) and 87B (west) (formerly 59A-B); to Harbourside Place and Jonathan Dickinson State Park
Martin		96.064	154.600	60	96	CR 708 – Hobe Sound	
Martin		100.836	162.280	61	101	SR 76 (Kanner Highway) – Stuart, Indiantown	
Martin				Bridges over St. Lucie River			
Martin	Palm City	102.435	164.853	61C	102	CR 713 (High Meadow Avenue)	
Martin		110.253	177.435	62	110	CR 714 / SR 714 (Martin Highway)	
St. Lucie	Port St. Lucie	113.662	182.921	—	114	Becker Road	Opened July 30, 2009
St. Lucie	Port St. Lucie	117.745	189.492	63	118	Gatlin Boulevard/Tradition Parkway to SR 716 east / Florida's Turnpike	to Cleveland Clinic Tradition Hospital
St. Lucie	Port St. Lucie	119.977	193.084	—	120	Crosstown Parkway	Opened March 28, 2009
St. Lucie	Port St. Lucie	121.195	195.044	63C	121	St. Lucie West Boulevard	Formerly Prima Vista Boulevard
St. Lucie	Port St. Lucie	125.593	202.122	64	126	CR 712 (Midway Road)	
St. Lucie	Fort Pierce	128.858	207.377	65	129	SR 70 (Okeechobee Road) to Florida's Turnpike – Fort Pierce, Vero Beach, Okeechobee	To HCA Florida Lawnwood Hospital, Indian River State College
St. Lucie	Fort Pierce	131.089	210.967	66	131	SR 68 (Orange Avenue)	To SR 713, Treasure Coast International Airport, National Navy UDT-SEAL Museum, Fort Pierce Inlet State Park, HCA Florida Lawnwood Hospital; previously signed as exits 131A (east) and 131B (west), formerly exits 66A-B
St. Lucie	Fort Pierce	137.561	221.383	67	138	SR 614 (Indrio Road)	
Indian River	Vero Beach	142.897	229.970	—	143	SR 606 (Oslo Road)	Partial cloverleaf interchange; opened October 5, 2026.
Indian River	Vero Beach	146.825	236.292	68	147	SR 60 to Florida's Turnpike – Vero Beach, Lake Wales	To Cleveland Clinic Indian River Hospital, Vero Beach Regional Airport, Vero Beach Outlets, Indian River Mall, Riverside Theatre, Historic Dodgertown
Indian River	Fellsmere	155.960	250.993	69	156	SR 512 / CR 512 – Fellsmere, Sebastian	To Orlando Health Sebastian River Hospital, St. Sebastian River Preserve State Park, Sebastian Inlet State Park
Brevard	Palm Bay	166.000	267.151	—	166	St. John's Heritage Parkway SE	Diverging diamond interchange; opened August 11, 2020
Brevard	Palm Bay	173.166	278.684	70	173	SR 514 (Malabar Road) – Palm Bay, Malabar	To Palm Bay Hospital
Brevard	Palm Bay–West Melbourne line	176.163	283.507	70A	176	CR 516 (Palm Bay Road) – Palm Bay	
Brevard	June Park–West Melbourne line	180.561	290.585	71	180	US 192 (New Haven Avenue) – West Melbourne, Melbourne, St. Cloud, Kissimmee	Access to Melbourne Regional Medical Center
Brevard	West Melbourne–Melbourne line	182.000	292.901	—	182	Ellis Road / St. Johns Heritage Parkway – West Melbourne, Melbourne Orlando International Airport	Opened June 2, 2020; access to Melbourne Regional Medical Center
Brevard	Melbourne	183.430	295.202	72	183	SR 518 east (Eau Gallie Boulevard) – Melbourne, Indian Harbour Beach	Access to Melbourne Regional Medical Center
Brevard	Melbourne	188.447	303.276	—	188	SR 404 (Pineda Causeway) – Patrick Space Force Base, Satellite Beach	Opened May 11, 2011
Brevard	Viera	191.074	307.504	73	191	CR 509 (Wickham Road) – Viera	
Brevard	Viera	193	311	—	193	Viera Boulevard – Viera	Diverging diamond interchange; opened July 1, 2019
Brevard	Rockledge	195.707	314.960	74	195	SR 519 (Fiske Boulevard) – Rockledge, Viera	
Brevard	Cocoa	201.373	324.078	75	201	SR 520 (King Street) – Cocoa Historic District, Cocoa Beach	
Brevard	Cocoa	202.545	325.965	76	202	SR 524 – Cocoa	
Brevard	Cocoa	205.323	330.435	77	205	SR 528 (Beachline Expressway) – Port Canaveral, Orlando, Cape Canaveral	Signed as 205A (east) and 205B (west); exits 42A-B on SR 528; to Orlando International Airport, Disney World, SeaWorld, Universal Orlando, and Orange County Convention Center
Brevard		208.222	335.101	77C	208	Port St. John	
Brevard	Titusville	211.846	340.933	78	212	SR 407 (Challenger Memorial Parkway) – Kennedy Space Center, Orlando	Orlando not signed northbound; to Orlando International Airport, Disney World, SeaWorld, Universal Orlando, Orange County Convention Center, and Kennedy Space Center
Brevard	Titusville	215.542	346.881	79	215	SR 50 (Cheney Highway) – Titusville, Orlando	
Brevard	Titusville	219.990	354.040	80	220	SR 406 (Garden Street) – Titusville Historic District	To Parrish Medical Center
Brevard	Mims	223.619	359.880	81	223	SR 46 – Sanford, Mims	To Parrish Medical Center and Orlando Sanford International Airport
Brevard		231.192	372.067	82	231	CR 5A – Oak Hill, Scottsmoor	
Volusia	Edgewater	244.056	392.770	83	244	SR 442 – Edgewater, Oak Hill	
Volusia	New Smyrna Beach	248.901	400.567	84	249	SR 44 – DeLand, New Smyrna Beach, Wildwood	Signed as exits 249A (east) and 249B (west) southbound (previously 84A-B)
Volusia	New Smyrna Beach–Port Orange line				251	CR 4118 (Pioneer Trail) – New Smyrna Beach, Port Orange	Proposed Interchange
Volusia	Port Orange	255.889	411.813	85	256	SR 421 – Port Orange	
Volusia	Daytona Beach	260.441	419.139	86	260	I-4 west / SR 400 east – Orlando, South Daytona	Signed as exits 260A (east) and 260B (west) (formerly 86A-B); eastern terminus of I-4; to Orlando International Airport, Orlando Sanford International Airport, Disney World, SeaWorld, Universal Orlando and Orange County Convention Center
Volusia	Daytona Beach	261.731	421.215	87; 261	260C	US 92 – Daytona Beach, DeLand	Exit renumbered in 2019 as part of the Systems Interchange project; access to Daytona Beach International Airport, Halifax Health Medical Center and Daytona International Speedway
Volusia	Daytona Beach	265.220	426.830	87C	265	CR 4019 (LPGA Boulevard) – Holly Hill, Daytona Beach	
Volusia	Ormond Beach	267.885	431.119	88	268	SR 40 – Ormond Beach, Ocala	
Volusia	Ormond Beach	273.461	440.093	89	273	US 1 – Ormond Beach, Bunnell	
Flagler		278.348	447.958	90	278	CR 2002 (Old Dixie Highway)	
Flagler	Palm Coast	283.599	456.408	91	284	SR 100 – Bunnell, Flagler Beach	
Flagler	Palm Coast	289.396	465.738	91C	289	CR 1424 (Palm Coast Parkway) – Palm Coast	Opened April 1981
Flagler	Palm Coast	293	472	—	293	Matanzas Woods Parkway – Palm Coast	Opened March 28, 2016
St. Johns		298.008	479.597	92	298	US 1 – St. Augustine, Bunnell	
St. Johns		305.179	491.138	93	305	SR 206 – Hastings, Crescent Beach	
St. Johns		310.875	500.305	94	311	SR 207 – St. Augustine Beach, Palatka	To Flagler Hospital
St. Johns		317.512	510.986	95	318	SR 16 – St. Augustine, Green Cove Springs	
St. Johns	World Golf Village	323.202	520.143	95A	323	International Golf Parkway	
St. Johns				—	326	SR 23 (First Coast Expressway)	Construction slated for late 2025; future SR 23 exit 1
St. Johns	St. Johns	329.095	529.627	96	329	CR 210 – Ponte Vedra Beach, Green Cove Springs	
Duval	Jacksonville	333	536	—	333	I-795 / SR 9B to CR 2209 / I-295 north – Jacksonville Beaches	Opened June 13, 2016; SR 9B exit 4; future I-795
Duval	Jacksonville	335.258	539.545	—	335	Old St. Augustine Road	To Baptist Medical Center South
Duval	Jacksonville	337.184	542.645	97	337	I-295 to I-10 – Orange Park, Jacksonville Beaches	I-295 exit 61
Duval	Jacksonville	338.482	544.734	98	339	US 1 (Philips Highway)	Serves The Avenues
Duval	Jacksonville	339.294	546.041	99	340	SR 115 (Southside Boulevard)	Northbound exit and southbound entrance from southbound Southside Boulevard only
Duval	Jacksonville	341.215	549.132	100	341	SR 152 (Baymeadows Road)	
Duval	Jacksonville	343.546	552.884	101	344	SR 202 (Butler Boulevard) – Jacksonville Beaches	To St. Vincent's Medical Center Southside
Duval	Jacksonville	344.996	555.217	102	345	Bowden Road to SR 109 (University Boulevard)	Northbound exit and southbound entrance
Duval	Jacksonville	345.372	555.822	103	346	SR 109 (University Boulevard)	Southbound exit and northbound entrance; signed as exits 346A (east) and 346B (west) (formerly 103A-B)
Duval	Jacksonville	347.179	558.730	104	347	US 1 Alt. (Emerson Street)	
Duval	Jacksonville	348.6	561.0	—	348	US 90 / US 1 / SR 13 (Acosta Expressway / Acosta Bridge) – Downtown Jacksonville	Northbound exit and southbound entrance; collector–distributor lanes; to Sports Complex
Duval	Jacksonville	348.646	561.091	105	348	US 1 south (Philips Highway)	Southbound exit to southbound Phillips Highway, northbound entrance from northbound Phillips Highway; former configuration
Duval	Jacksonville	349.012	561.680	106	349	US 90 east – Jacksonville Beaches	Southern end of SR 10 concurrency (northbound); southbound exit and northbound entrance; former configuration
Duval	Jacksonville	349.444	562.376	107	350A	US 1 / SR 5 (Phillips Highway) / US 90 (Atlantic Boulevard)	Northern end of SR 10 concurrency (northbound); southbound exit and northbound entrance; via southbound Acosta Expressway
Duval	Jacksonville	349.785	562.924	108	350B	Gary Street to Palm Avenue to San Marco Boulevard	Southbound exit and northbound entrance; To Baptist Health Southbank Plaza
Duval	Jacksonville	350.175– 350.649	563.552– 564.315	Fuller Warren Bridge over the St. Johns River			
Duval	Jacksonville	351.0	564.9	109	351A	Park Street	Northbound exit and southbound entrance
Duval	Jacksonville	351.186	565.179	110	351B	I-10 west (US 17 south / SR 15 south / SR 228 west) – Lake City	Southern end of US 17/SR 15/SR 228 concurrency; southbound has separate exits for I-10 (351A-B), with 352D used to collector/distributor roads; eastern terminus of I-10
Duval	Jacksonville	351.186	565.179	111	351C	Margaret Street	Former southbound exit
Duval	Jacksonville	351.186	565.179	112; 351D	351C	To Stockton Street via Irene Street	Southbound exit and northbound entrance
Duval	Jacksonville	351.40	565.52	113	352A	Forest Street / Riverside Avenue – Convention Center	Southbound exit and northbound entrance; exit 352A also signed from ramp from I-10 east to I-95 north
Duval	Jacksonville	351.987	566.468	114	352B	Forsyth Street – Convention Center	Northbound exit and southbound entrance
Duval	Jacksonville	352.18	566.78	115	352C	Monroe Street – Downtown Jacksonville	Southbound exit is via exit 353A
Duval	Jacksonville	352.25	566.89	116	353A	Church Street / Myrtle Avenue / Forsyth Street	Southbound exit only
Duval	Jacksonville	352.487	567.273	117	353B	Union Street (US 17 north / US 23 south / SR 228 east) / Beaver Street (US 90) – Downtown Jacksonville, Sports Complex	Northern end of US 17/SR 228 concurrency
Duval	Jacksonville	352.60	567.45	118	353C	US 23 north (Kings Road) – Edward Waters College	
Duval	Jacksonville	353.326	568.623	119	353D	SR 114 (8th Street)	To UF Health Jacksonville
Duval	Jacksonville	353.929	569.594	120	354	US 1 (M.L. King Jr. Parkway / SR 15 north / SR 115 south) – Amtrak	Northern end of SR 15 concurrency; southern end of SR 115 concurrency; signed as exits 354A (south) and 354B (north) (previously 120A-B)
Duval	Jacksonville	354.543	570.582	121	355	SR 122 (Golfair Boulevard)	
Duval	Jacksonville	355.842	572.672	122	356	SR 115 north (Lem Turner Road) / SR 117 south (Norwood Avenue)	Northern end of SR 115 concurrency; signed as exits 356A (south) and 356B (north) northbound (previously 122A-B)
Duval	Jacksonville	356.618	573.921	123	357	SR 111 (Edgewood Avenue)	
Duval	Jacksonville	356.708– 356.981	574.066– 574.505	Trout River Bridge over Trout River			
Duval	Jacksonville	357.707– 357.989	575.674– 576.127	124	358	SR 105 (Zoo Parkway / Heckscher Drive) to US 17; Broward Road	Signed as 358A (SR 105) and 358B (Broward Road); additional southbound entrance from Clark Road
Duval	Jacksonville	359.450	578.479	125	360	SR 104 (Dunn Avenue / Busch Drive)	
Duval	Jacksonville	361.544	581.849	126	362	I-295 – Jaxport Terminals, Jacksonville Beaches	Signed as exits 362A (east) and 362B (west) (previously 126A-B); I-295 exit 35
Duval	Jacksonville	363.081	584.322	127	363	Airport Road (SR 102) / Max Leggett Parkway – Jacksonville International Airport	Signed as exits 363A (east) and 363B (west) northbound (formerly 127A-B); to UF Health North and Jacksonville North VA Clinic
Duval	Jacksonville	365.657	588.468	128	366	SR 243 (Pecan Park Road)	
Nassau		372.789	599.946	129	373	SR 200 / SR A1A – Callahan, Fernandina Beach	Diverging diamond interchange; implemented November 15, 2020
Nassau	Gross	379.407	610.596	130	380	US 17	
St. Mary's River		382.009	614.784			I-95 north – Savannah	Continuation into Georgia
1.000 mi = 1.609 km; 1.000 km = 0.621 mi: Concurrency terminus; Electronic toll collection; Incomplete access

=== Express lanes ===
Express lanes begin in Downtown Miami and are planned to extend as far north as Jupiter. All exits are unnumbered.

County	Location	mi	km	Destinations	Notes
Miami-Dade	Miami			I-95 south – Downtown Miami	Southern terminus of express lanes
Miami-Dade	Miami			SR 112 west – Miami International Airport	Southbound exit and northbound entrance
Miami-Dade	Golden Glades			Florida's Turnpike / SR 826	Access via local lanes
Miami-Dade	Golden Glades			Park and Ride, Express Buses	Northbound exit and southbound entrance
Miami-Dade	Ives Estates–Ojus line			Ives Dairy Road	Access via local lanes
Broward	Dania Beach			I-595 / Broward Boulevard – Fort Lauderdale Airport, Port Everglades	Access via local lanes
Broward	Fort Lauderdale			I-595 west to Florida's Turnpike / I-75	Direct interchange (phase 3C); Opened November 11th, 2025
Broward	Fort Lauderdale			Amtrak/Tri-Rail Park-Ride	Direct interchange (phase 3A)
Broward	Oakland Park			SR 816 (Oakland Park Boulevard)	Access via local lanes (phase 3A)
Broward	Oakland Park			Cypress Creek Road	Southbound exit and northbound entrance via local lanes (phase 3A)
Broward	Deerfield Beach			Southwest 10th Street to Sawgrass Expressway	Northbound exit and southbound entrance; northern terminus of phase 3A
Broward	Deerfield Beach			SR 869 west (Sawgrass Expressway)	Future direct interchange
Palm Beach	Boca Raton			SR 808 (Glades Road)	Access via local lanes (phase 3B)
Palm Beach	Boca Raton			CR 807 (Congress Avenue)	Northern terminus of phase 3B
1.000 mi = 1.609 km; 1.000 km = 0.621 mi: Incomplete access; Unopened

== Auxiliary routes ==
- I-195: Julia Tuttle Causeway, a spur in Miami, crossing Biscayne Bay
- I-295: Beltway around Jacksonville
- I-395: Spur located north of Downtown Miami connecting to the MacArthur Causeway
- I-595: Port Everglades Expressway, a two-way spur between Sunrise and Fort Lauderdale
- I-795: future designation along SR 9B in southern Jacksonville

== See also ==
- Transportation in Florida
- Transportation in South Florida
- Transportation in Jacksonville, Florida

Interstate 95
Previous state: Terminus	Florida	Next state: Georgia
