= Florida State Road 708 =

State highway in Florida, United States

State Road 708
- Blue Heron Boulevard

Route information
- Maintained by FDOT
- Length: 3.682 mi (5.926 km)

Major junctions
- West end: SR 710 in Riviera Beach
- I-95 in Riviera Beach
- East end: US 1 / SR A1A in Riviera Beach

Location
- Country: United States
- State: Florida
- Counties: Palm Beach

Highway system
- Florida State Highway System; Interstate; US; State; Former; Pre‑1945; Toll; Scenic
| ← SR 706 | → SR 710 |

State Road 708 (SR 708) is a 3.682-mile-long (5.926 km), east–west thoroughfare in Riviera Beach locally known as Blue Heron Boulevard. The road extends from an intersection with Bee-Line Highway (State Road 710) to an intersection with Broadway (U.S. Route 1 (US 1).

== Route description ==
State Road 708 begins as Blue Heron Boulevard at an intersection with Bee Line Highway at the southern end of the VA Hospital. The road heads east towards its first stoplight at Military Trail (SR 809), with a mix of residential and commercial areas for the half mile between Military Trail and the interchange with Interstate 95 (I-95). East of I-95, SR 708 passes through a few businesses, before crossing a canal, and then becomes almost exclusively residential with some commercial mixed in for the rest of the route. It jogs slightly to the south before intersecting Congress Avenue, and continues east, passing by a local park, and industrial areas on the south side of SR 708. Blue Heron Boulevard then jogs to the north just prior to meeting Old Dixie Highway (CR 811), and heads east through a dense residential area before terminating at US 1.

Blue Heron Boulevard continues as SR A1A eastward from US 1, crossing Lake Worth on the Riviera Beach Bridge to serve the beach just north of Palm Beach Shores.

== Major intersections ==
The entire route is in Palm Beach County.

| Location | mi | km | Destinations | Notes |
|---|---|---|---|---|
| Riviera Beach | 0.000 | 0.000 | SR 710 west (Bee-Line Highway) | Westbound access to SR 710 east is via SR 809 |
| Riviera Beach | 0.361 | 0.581 | SR 809 (Military Trail) | |
| Riviera Beach | 0.860 | 1.384 | I-95 – Daytona Beach, West Palm Beach | Exit 76 on I-95 |
| Riviera Beach | 1.595 | 2.567 | Congress Avenue – Tri-Rail | |
| Riviera Beach | 2.861 | 4.604 | Australian Avenue (CR 704A south) | Northern terminus of CR 704A (former SR 704A) |
| Riviera Beach | 2.905 | 4.675 | President Barack Obama Highway (CR 811) – Port of Palm Beach | Former routing of Dixie Highway |
| Riviera Beach | 3.682 | 5.926 | US 1 (Broadway) / SR A1A north (Blue Heron Boulevard) – Port of Palm Beach | |
1.000 mi = 1.609 km; 1.000 km = 0.621 mi: Incomplete access
