= Parrish Medical Center =

Geography
- Location: 951 N. Washington Ave., Titusville, Florida, United States
- Coordinates: 28.6305575°N 80.8246301°W

Organization
- Type: Acute care

Services
- Beds: 210

History
- Founded: 1958

Links
- Website: www.parrishmed.com
- Lists: Hospitals in Florida

Parrish Medical Center is a public, not-for-profit, 210-bed acute care hospital in Titusville, Florida, within sight of the launch towers of Kennedy Space Center. It was founded by Jess Parrish in 1958.

== History ==
It was founded in 1958 as North Brevard Hospital. It expanded facilities in 1964, 1981, and 1991.

Construction on an $80 million, 371,000-square-foot (34,500 m^{2}) replacement hospital began in 2000. The new facility opened in 2002. The old was demolished.

In 2007, Blue Cross Blue Shield of Florida failed to get an agreement, forcing local holders of this insurance to go elsewhere for hospital services. The two reached an agreement in 2011.

Parrish has received a number of awards from public and private organizations.

In 2011, it had 65.9% of its admissions through the emergency room, somewhat above the state average of 61.6%. Some of this difference can be explained by procedural differences in how hospitals admit patients.

== Hospital rating data ==
The HealthGrades website contains the clinical quality data for Parrish Medical Center, as of 2018. For this rating section clinical quality rating data and patient safety ratings are presented.

For inpatient conditions and procedures, there are three possible ratings: worse than expected, as expected, better than expected. For this hospital the data for this category is:

- Worse than expected - 2
- As expected - 21
- Better than expected - 5

For patient safety ratings the same three possible ratings are used. For this hospital they are:

- Worse than expected - 1
- As expected - 10
- Better than expected - 1

Percent of patients who would rate this hospital as a 9 or 10 - 69%. Percent of patients nationally who rate hospitals on average a 9 or 10 - 69%.
