= Northlake Boulevard =

Highway in Florida

Northlake Boulevard
- State Road 850 and County Road 809A
- CR 809A in blue, SR 850 in red

Route information
- Maintained by FDOT and Palm Beach EP&W
- Length: 14.645 mi (23.569 km) 1.645 miles (2.647 km) as SR 850; 13.4 miles (21.57 km) as CR 809A
- Existed: 1983–present

Major junctions
- West end: Seminole Pratt Whitney Road in Loxahatchee
- SR 710 in Palm Beach Gardens; I-95 in Palm Beach Gardens
- East end: US 1 in North Palm Beach

Location
- Country: United States
- State: Florida
- Counties: Palm Beach

Highway system
- Florida State Highway System; Interstate; US; State; Former; Pre‑1945; Toll; Scenic
← SR 849	→ SR 852

Northlake Boulevard is an east–west road in Palm Beach County, Florida that currently comprises State Road 850 (SR 850) and County Road 809A (CR 809A) from Seminole Pratt Whitney Road in Loxahatchee to US 1 in North Palm Beach.

== Route description ==
=== CR 809A ===
As CR 809A, Northlake Boulevard crosses the southernmost portion of Palm Beach Gardens and the northernmost corner of West Palm Beach, beginning at an intersection with Seminole Pratt Whitney Road, in the wetlands north of Loxahatchee. Later, it meets SR 710, then Jog Road, which provides access to Florida's Turnpike.

=== SR 850 ===
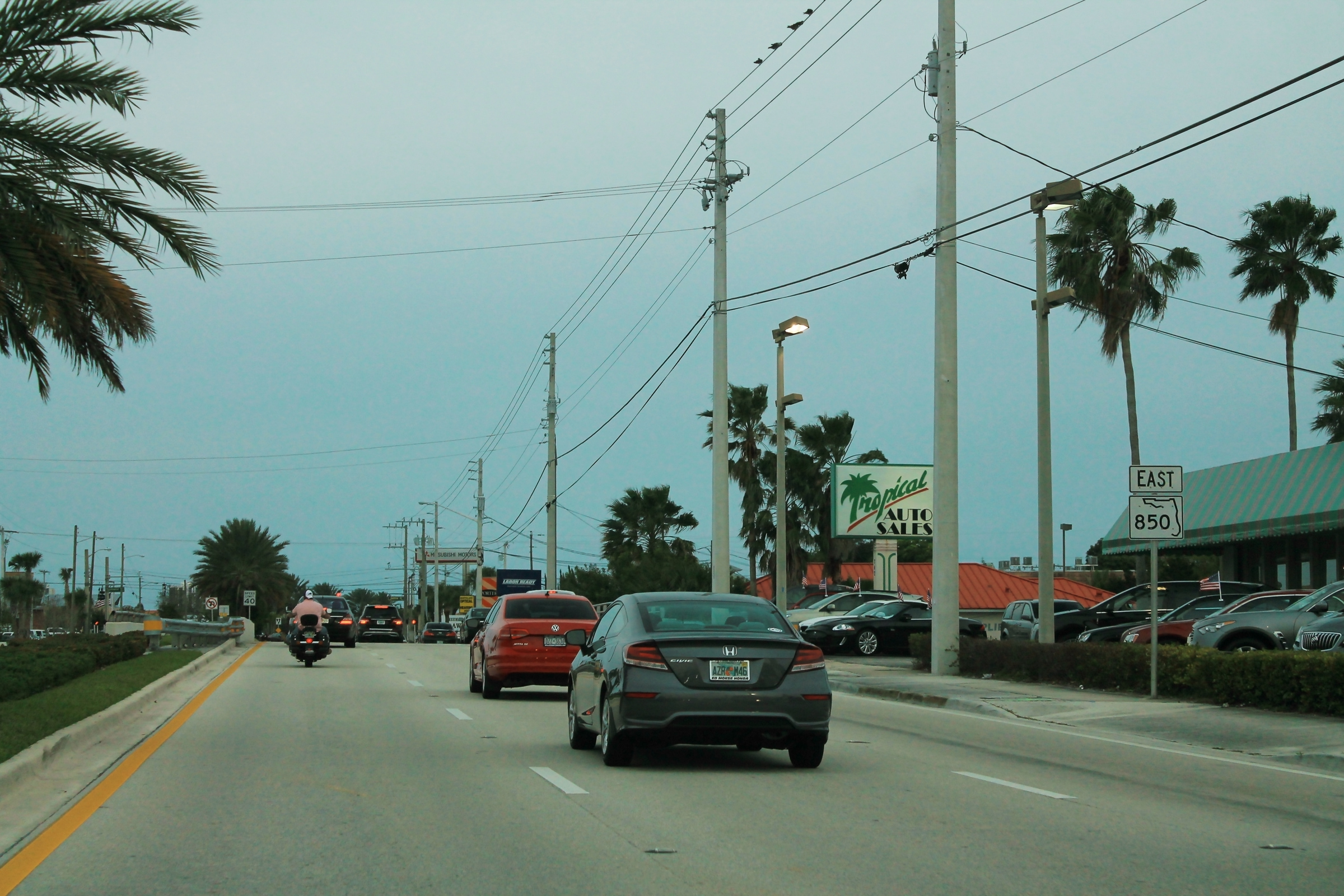
A sign denoting (former) Florida State Road 850 on Northlake Boulevard in Riviera Beach.

State Road 850 begins at the intersection of State Road 811 and Northlake Boulevard, with Northlake Boulevard serving as the border between Lake Park to the south and North Palm Beach to the north. SR 850 takes Northlake Boulevard east as a six lane divided road, with shopping destinations lining both sides of the road for the brief 1.2 mile road. The road crosses a small canal halfway through the road, and it enters North Palm Beach proper 0.2 miles west of the eastern terminus at US 1.

On December 19, 2017, the Palm Beach County Board of Commissioners approved a transfer agreement to submit to the Florida Department of Transportation, which would transfer SR 850 to county maintenance. In May 2018, the transfer was completed, effectively deleting SR 850 from the state highway system. The county has not announced if they intend to maintain the 850 designation, or add it to CR 809A.

== History ==
Before 1970 the road was named West Lake Park Road.

Before 1980, State Road 850 was a Florida Department of Transportation designation for a stretch of Corkscrew Road in Collier County, Florida that is now County Road 850. From 1980 to 1983, State Road 850 was an FDOT designation for the road in Miami-Dade County, Florida that is now SR 932. Northlake Boulevard was given the SR 850 designation in 1983.

== Major intersections ==
The entire route is in Palm Beach County.

Location	mi	km	Destinations	Notes
Loxahatchee	0.00	0.00	Seminole Pratt Whitney Road	Western terminus of CR 809A
West Palm Beach	5.90	9.50	State Road 7	Future routing of SR 7
Palm Beach Gardens	8.70	14.00	SR 710 to Florida's Turnpike	
Palm Beach Gardens	9.50	15.29	Jog Road to Florida's Turnpike	SunPass interchange; exit 107 on Turnpike
Palm Beach Gardens	11.50	18.51	SR 809 (Military Trail)	
Palm Beach Gardens	12.10	19.47	I-95 – West Palm Beach, Daytona Beach	Exit 77 on I-95
Palm Beach Gardens	12.90	20.76	Congress Avenue south	Northern terminus of Congress Avenue
Lake Park–North Palm Beach line	13.40 0.000	21.57 0.000	SR 811 north (Alternate A1A) / CR 811 south (10th Street)	CR 809A transitions to SR 850; southern terminus of SR 811; northern terminus of CR 811
North Palm Beach	1.245	2.004	US 1	Eastern terminus of SR 850
1.000 mi = 1.609 km; 1.000 km = 0.621 mi: Electronic toll collection; Route transition
