= North Palm Beach County General Aviation Airport =

- IATA: none; ICAO: none; FAA LID: F45

Summary
- Airport type: Public
- Owner: Palm Beach County
- Serves: West Palm Beach, Florida
- Location: Palm Beach Gardens, Florida
- Elevation AMSL: 22 ft (6.7 m)
- Coordinates: 26°50′45″N 080°13′20″W
- Website: pbia.org/about/general-aviation/...

Map
- Interactive map of North Palm Beach County General Aviation Airport

Runways
Direction	Length		Surface
Direction	ft	m	Surface
9L/27R	3,679	1,121	Turf
9R/27L	4,300	1,311	Asphalt
14/32	4,300	1,311	Asphalt

Statistics (2018)
- Aircraft operations: 97,400
- Based aircraft: 264
- Source: Federal Aviation Administration

North Palm Beach County Airport (FAA LID: F45), also known as North County Airport, is an uncontrolled (non-towered) general aviation airport located 12 nautical miles (22 kilometres) northwest of West Palm Beach off the Bee Line Highway in Palm Beach Gardens, Florida. The airport is owned by Palm Beach County and operated by the Palm Beach County Airports Department. Opened in 1994, it is the county's newest airport. It is located next to the site of the "fake" town of Apix, Florida.

The field is in proximity to, and shares services with, William P. Gwinn Airport (FAA LID: 06FA) (more commonly referred to as Gwinn Airfield) which is owned by United Technologies Corporation (UTC). It was previously operated by its Pratt & Whitney jet engine business unit and is currently operated by its Sikorsky Aircraft business unit. Due to its proximity to the Sikorsky test grounds, North County is often used to test ILS approaches on experimental or prototype helicopters such as the RAH-66 Comanche, SH-60 Seahawk and the S-92.

DayJet previously provided an on-demand jet air taxi service from this airport to Jacksonville, Lakeland, Tallahassee, Pensacola, Gainesville, Boca Raton, Opa-Locka/Miami Dade County, Naples, Sarasota/Bradenton, Savannah, Macon, and Montgomery until its liquidation in bankruptcy in 2008.

== Facilities and aircraft ==
=== Facilities ===
==== Runways ====
North Palm Beach County General Aviation Airport covers an area of 1,832 acres (741 ha) at an elevation of 22 feet (6.7 m) above mean sea level, with over 1,100 acres being dedicated to environmental preserves that surround the airport. It has one turf runway designated 9L/27R which measures 3,679 by 75 feet (1,121 by 23 m) and two asphalt paved runways: 9R/27L measuring 4,300 by 100 feet (1,311 by 30 m) and 14/32 measuring 4,300 by 75 feet (1,311 by 23 m). It is a designated reliever for President Donald J. Trump International Airport and serves both reciprocating engine and jet aircraft.

In 2025, the FAA approved a runway extension for the North Palm Beach County General Aviation Airport. After a five-year environmental study, the project was approved and will allow Runway 14/32 to be extended from 4,300 feet to 6,000 feet. The runway's parallel taxiway will also be extended. Construction is expected to begin in 2027. The airport says this extension will allow it to welcome a wider array of aircraft, most notably increasing the number of jet aircraft that can use the airport. The airport says this project will improve its ability to act as a reliever airport to President Donald J. Trump International Airport, especially when jets must divert.

==== Hangars ====
The airport facilities consist of a terminal, a large storage hangar, an aircraft maintenance hangar, and 176 aircraft storage hangars. There are two active helicopter landing pads.

The airport has one fixed-base operator, Signature Flight Support, located in the middle of the apron.

==== Other Facilities ====
Funding for the airport's runway extension also includes the possibility of building an Air Traffic Control Tower at the airport.<

=== Aircraft ===
For the 12-month period ending December 31, 2018, the airport had 97,400 aircraft operations, an average of 267 per day, 93% general aviation, 7% air taxi, and <1% military. At that time there were 264 aircraft based at this airport: 189 single-engine, 45 multi-engine, 11 jet, 1 glider and 18 helicopter.

Flight operations doubled between 2008 and 2021, and with a planned runway extension may reach 110,000 annually by 2030.

The airport is home to many Cirrus aircraft, along with Piper Cubs, Commanders, various Cessna models, Piper Cherokees, Piper Arrows, Beechcraft Bonanzas, Beechcraft Barons, Pilatus PC-12s, numerous Cessna Citation Jets and many more.

North County is home to Ocean Helicopters and Cloud 9 Helicopters, both of which maintain a fleet of Robinson helicopters and are FAA Certified Part 141 Flight Schools. Aamro Aviation is the only fixed-wing school at the airport; it conducts Part 61 and FAA Certified Part 141 flight training and aircraft rentals in Cessna 172s.

== Accidents & incidents ==
- On October 8, 2020, a twin-engine Cessna 414 with seven passengers onboard crashed after departing from the North Palm Beach County General Aviation Airport. Multiple passengers were taken to a nearby hospital with traumatic injuries.
- On July 10, 2024, a Piper PA28 crashed shortly after performing a touch-and-go at the North Palm Beach County General Aviation Airport. The flight instructor and pilot receiving instruction were both killed. The probable cause of the accident was found to be a loss of engine power for reasons that could not be determined.
- On February 12, 2026, a Cessna Citation jet hit multiple deer while taking off from the North Palm Beach County General Aviation Airport. The aircraft safely diverted to the Palm Beach International Airport.

== See also ==
- List of airports in Florida
