= Firecatcher F-45 =

Single-turboprop utility aircraft in development

F-45

General information
- Type: Utility aircraft
- National origin: New Zealand/United Kingdom
- Manufacturer: Firecatcher Aircraft
- Status: in development

The Firecatcher Aircraft F-45 is a single-turboprop aircraft designed for aerial firefighting, air freight and commuter airlines. It is financed by UK start-up Arcus Fire, designed by New Zealand firm Flight Structures and built by NZ's Pacific Aerospace. First flight is planned for 2023 and first delivery for 2024.

== Development ==
The $4.2 million F-45 is targeted to replace previous designs like the Bombardier CL-215 or the Grumman S-2AT, a market estimated at 1,000 units over 10 to 15 years. By August 2020, Flight Structures had built the prototype's fuselage, awaiting wings from Pacific Aerospace, as flight testing was planned for 2023 in Hamilton, NZ. Initial certification is planned under the New Zealand Civil Aviation Authority’s restricted category for a simpler and faster process. First deliveries were planned from 2024, before cargo and passenger variants.

== Design ==
Resembling an oversized Cessna Caravan, the Short Take-Off and Landing F-45 is powered by a single Pratt & Whitney Canada PT6-67F. The air tanker is designed to carry 4,500 litres (1,190 US gal) of water or fire retardant. The cargo version will have a large cargo door with a flat-floor cabin that for three LD3 containers and a maximum payload of 2,500 kg (5,500 lb), targeting an operating cost of 27 cents per 100 lb of cargo per nmi. The passenger model will have a full stand-up cabin seating 19 people, and will cost $4.5 million like the cargo variant. It should cruise at speeds up to 190 kn (350 km/h) and have a range of 1,000 nmi (1,852 km) for 45-90 min regional hops.

== Specifications ==
Data from Flight

General characteristics

- Capacity:
  - air tanker: 4,500 L (1,190 US gal) of water or fire retardant
  - freighter: three LD3 containers, 2,500 kg (5,500 lb) max. payload
  - commuter: 19 passengers
- Powerplant: 1 × Pratt & Whitney PT6-67F turboprop

Performance

- Cruise speed: 350 km/h (220 mph, 190 kn)
- Range: 1,852 km (1,151 mi, 1,000 nmi)

== See also ==
Aircraft of comparable role, configuration, and era

- Bombardier CL-215
- Grumman S-2AT
- Cessna Caravan
