= Kings Point, Florida =

- unincorporated place
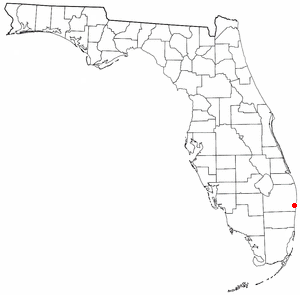
- Location of Kings Point, Florida
- Coordinates: 26°26′46″N 80°8′23″W
- Country: United States
- State: Florida
- County: Palm Beach

Area
  - Total: 1.8 sq mi (4.7 km^{2})
  - Land: 1.8 sq mi (4.7 km^{2})
  - Water: 0 sq mi (0.0 km^{2})
- Elevation: 16 ft (5 m)

Population (2000)
  - Total: 12,207
  - Density: 6,698/sq mi (2,586.3/km^{2})
- Time zone: UTC-5 (Eastern (EST))
  - Summer (DST): UTC-4 (EDT)
- Area codes: 561, 728
- FIPS code: 12-36812
- GNIS feature ID: 1867160

Kings Point was a former census-designated place (CDP) and current unincorporated place in Palm Beach County, Florida, United States, located west of Delray Beach. The population was 12,207 as of the 2000 census. The CDP consists primarily of a retirement community of the same name. The 2012 documentary Kings Point depicted the lives of some of the residents and was nominated for the Academy Award for Best Documentary (Short Subject).

== Geography ==
Kings Point is located at 26°26′46″N 80°8′23″W (26.446044, -80.139715).

According to the United States Census Bureau, the CDP has a total area of 4.7 km^{2} (1.8 sq mi), all land.

== Demographics ==
As of the census of 2000, there were 12,207 people, 7,998 households, and 3,599 families living in the CDP. The population density was 2,589.6 people/km^{2} (6,707 people/mi^{2}). There were 10,494 housing units at an average density of 2,226.2 units/km^{2} (5,766 units/mi^{2}). The racial makeup of the CDP was 99.10% White (98.1% were Non-Hispanic White), 0.27% African American, 0.04% Native American, 0.18% Asian, 0.01% Pacific Islander, 0.08% from other races, and 0.32% from two or more races. Hispanic or Latino of any race were 1.13% of the population.

In 2000, there were 7,998 households, out of which 0.1% had children under the age of 18 living with them, 42.0% were married couples living together, 2.2% had a female householder with no husband present, and 55.0% were non-families. 52.2% of all households were made up of individuals, and 47.6% had someone living alone who was 65 years of age or older. The average household size was 1.51 and the average family size was 2.05.

Of the residents in 2000, 0.2% were under the age of 18, 0.2% were 18 to 24, 1.8% were 25 to 44, 9.6% were 45 to 64, and 88.1% were 65 years of age or older. The median age was 78 years. For every 100 females age 18 and over, there were 67.0 males.

In 2000, the median income for a household in the CDP was $25,010, and the median income for a family was $34,761. Males had a median income of $35,275 versus $25,714 for females. The per capita income for the CDP was $21,893. About 4.0% of families and 7.4% of the population were below the poverty line, including none of those under age 18 and 7.0% of those age 65 or over.

As of 2000, English was the first language for 87.54% of all residents, while Yiddish accounted for 7.06%, Italian 1.14%, Spanish 0.85%, German 0.69%, and Hungarian 0.53% of the population.
