= Apix, Florida =

Former rocket testing facility

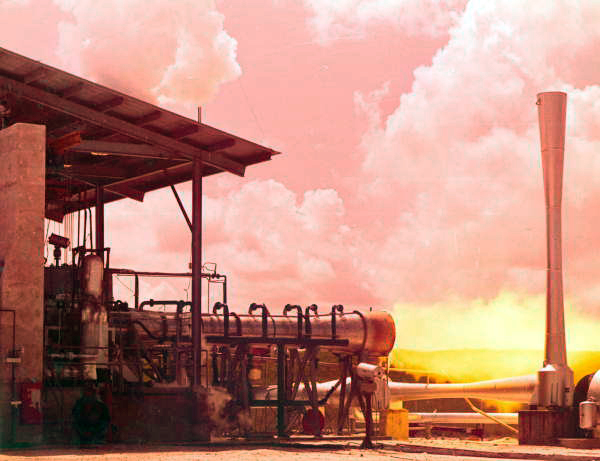
Testing the XLR-115 hydrogen fueled rocket engine at the Florida Research and Development Center in Apix

Apix, Florida, was a former rocket testing facility created as part of Project Suntan during the Space Race, including a fake town in Palm Beach County, Florida, the primary feature of which was an alleged fertilizer plant set among the surrounding swamplands. Very little details have been revealed about the rocket testing facility.

== Background and overview ==
=== Background ===
Starting in 1945, there was heavy research into hydrogen as a fuel source. The Air Force wanted to create a faster plane for spying than the U-2.

=== Overview and Alleged Location ===
In 1956, Pratt and Whitney along with the United States Air Force decided to buy a 10 square mile piece of land in Western Palm Beach County, and development plans included a main street called Hawthorn Road surrounded by housing plats (lots).

Apix was alleged to exist several miles west of Jupiter, near the intersection of the western terminus of West Indiantown Road and State Road 710 on the Beeline Highway. Apix never had a downtown area, post office, population, or government. Apix appeared on some contemporary maps from 1959 and 1960; one map listed "Apix" alongside location markers for the Pratt & Whitney plant, William R. Gwinn Airport, and Palm Beach Racetrack.

==== Security ====
At the time, the western part of Palm Beach County was sparsely populated. Authorities said it was a fertilizer producing town to cover up the operation so that residents would not be suspicious. The name Apix meant Air Products Inc, Experimental. There was also commercial protection to make sure that potential speculators and buyers stayed clear. Land nearby was also platted and had a census marker. Pratt & Whitney bought 9,000 acres near what would today be the J.W. Corbett Wildlife Refuge. For buyers to not know it was United Aircraft (now United Technologies), a third party bought a ranch and gave it to the Florida Game and Fresh Water Fish Commission which then gave it to the U.S. Air Force.

==== Testing ====
The project's main goal was to test liquid hydrogen as a fuel source for rockets which had been in interest of the United States government since the late 1940s. Apix was part of what was called Project Suntan that was carried out in extreme secrecy from 1956–1958. The plant could liquefy Hydrogen at approximately rate of a half a ton a day, costing $6.2 million a day ($53,580,135.23 in 2017) and would be transported in an underground pipeline to a testing facility. A second plant was built in 1959 and had a capacity of 30 tons and cost about $27 million. In February 1959, the managers decided that transporting liquid hydrogen in the underground pipeline took too much energy and decided to close it. Instead, they decided to ship hydrogen in insulated tanks on the Beeline Highway.

== Present ==
As of 2024, Pratt & Whitney still has an active campus on site, along with Aerojet Rocketdyne.
