= Filippo Barbieri =

Filippo Barbieri may refer to:

- Filippo Barbieri (historian) (1426–1487), Italian renaissance humanist
- Filippo Barbieri (cyclist) (born 1983), Brazilian mountainbiker
