= Cornell Art Museum at Old School Square =

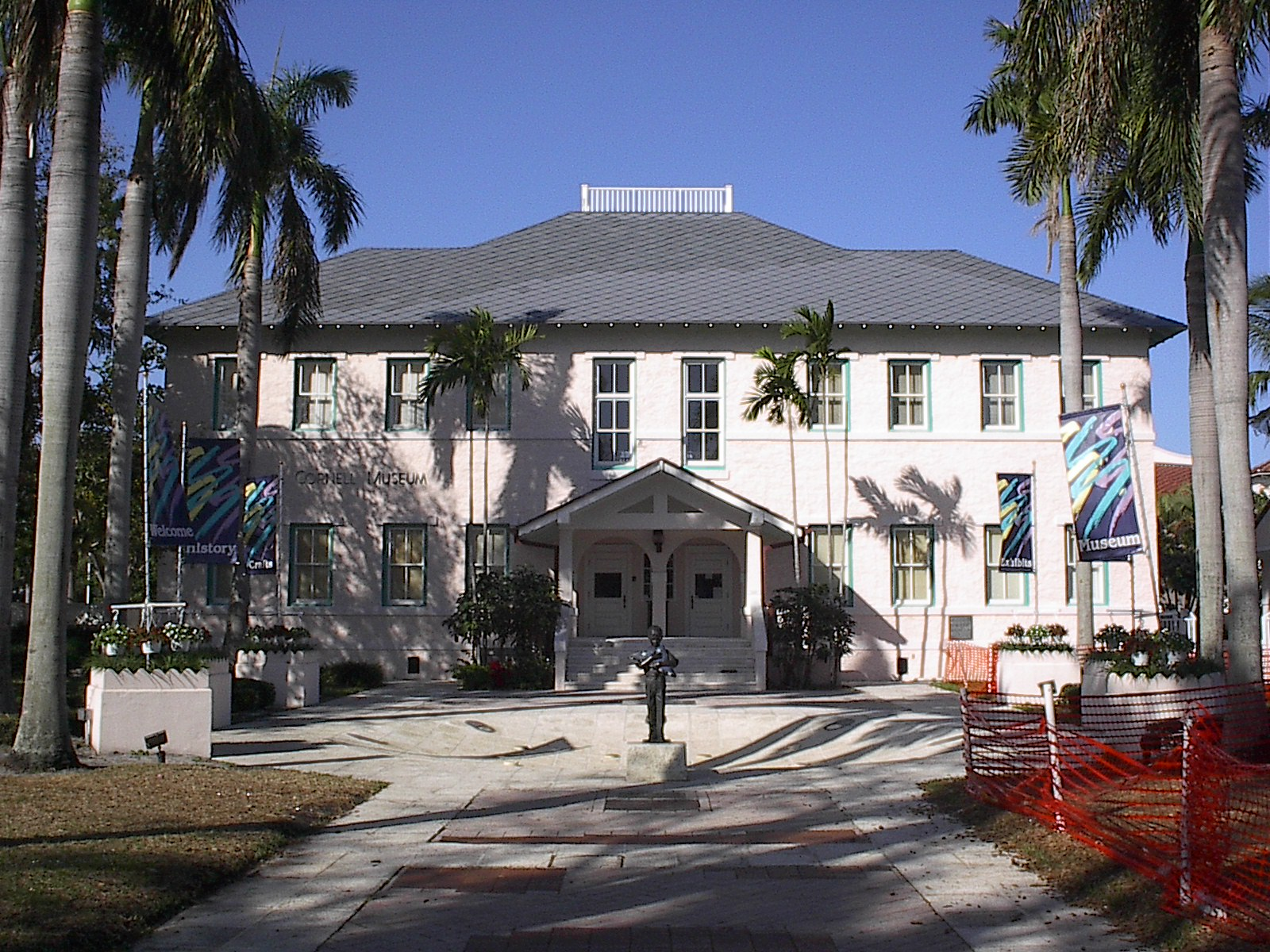

- Location within Florida
- Established: 1990
- Location: Delray Beach, Florida
- Coordinates: 26.462164°N 80.072702°W
- Type: Art museum
- Website: Cornell Art Museum at Old School Square

The Cornell Art Museum at Old School Square is a museum in the Old School Square section of Delray Beach, Florida. It opened in 1990 in a former elementary school. Its seven exhibition galleries for national and international exhibitions of fine contemporary art and regional artists. The museum is named after Delray residents Harriet W. and George D. Cornell.
