= Silverball Museum =

Museum of pinball machines

Coordinates: 26.46236°N 80.06977°W

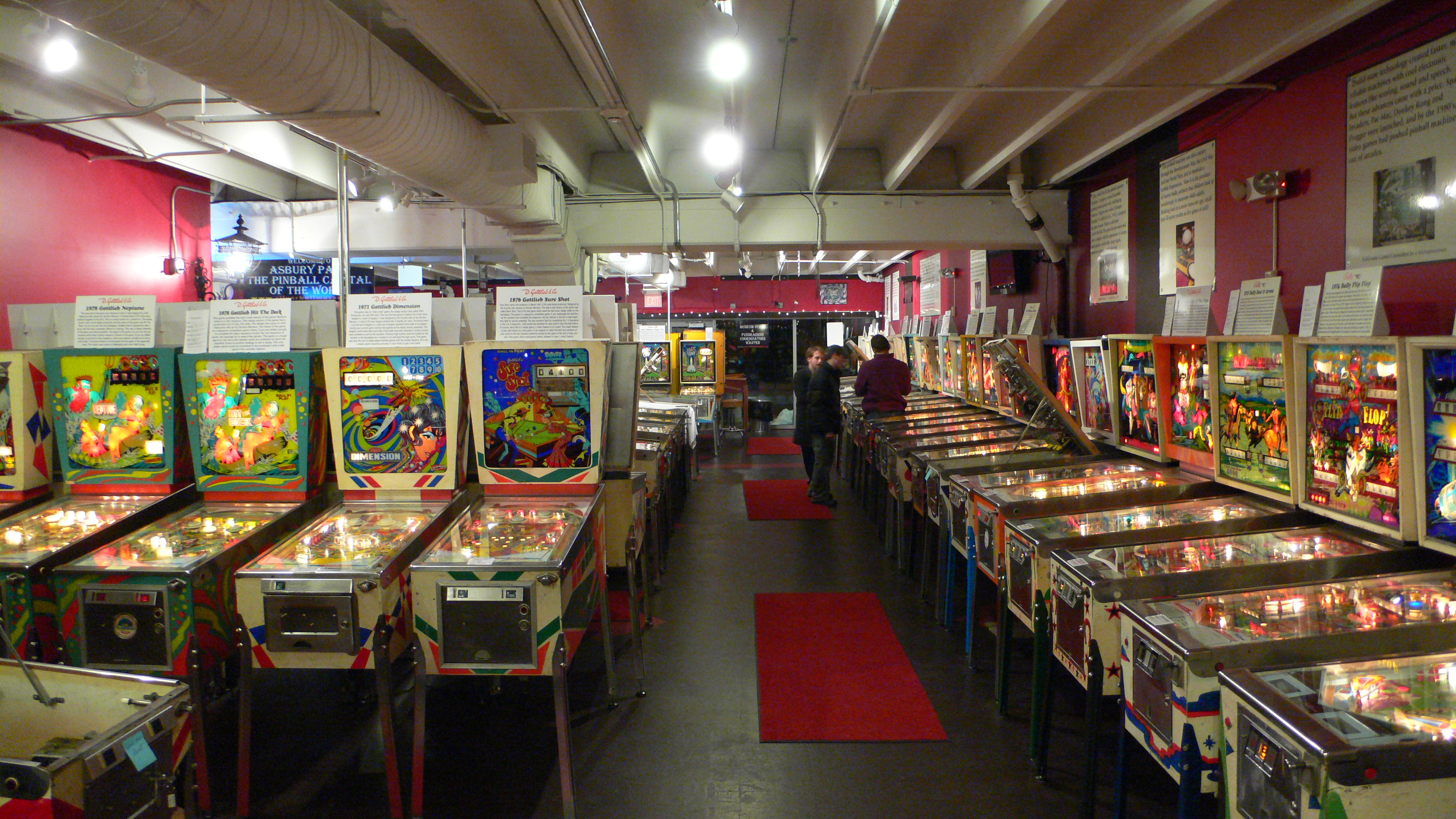
The Silverball Museum in Asbury Park, NJ (2010)

The Silverball Museum refers to two museum of pinball machines, located in Asbury Park, New Jersey and Delray Beach, Florida, both owned by Robert Ilvento.

== History ==
The first location opened in 2009 on the Asbury Park Boardwalk. The Florida location opened in 2017.

A custom-made LED light bulb was created to fit all the machines, with an estimated 230,000 to change on the approximately 600 machines held in 2013.

== Collection and services ==
As of 2020, the Ashbury Park location houses approximately 150 pinball machines, ranging from the 1940s to 2019.

In 2017, the Delray Beach location had 88 pinball machines and 24 arcade games, ranging from the 1950s to 2000s. The space expanded in 2018 and by 2020 had over 150 video games, which range from the 1930s to the 2010s. Admission to the museum gives free play on the machines, and guests can pay by the hour or the day. In addition to housing games, the 9,000 square foot building serves food and hosts events.
