= Delray Beach, Florida =

City in Palm Beach County, Florida

- City
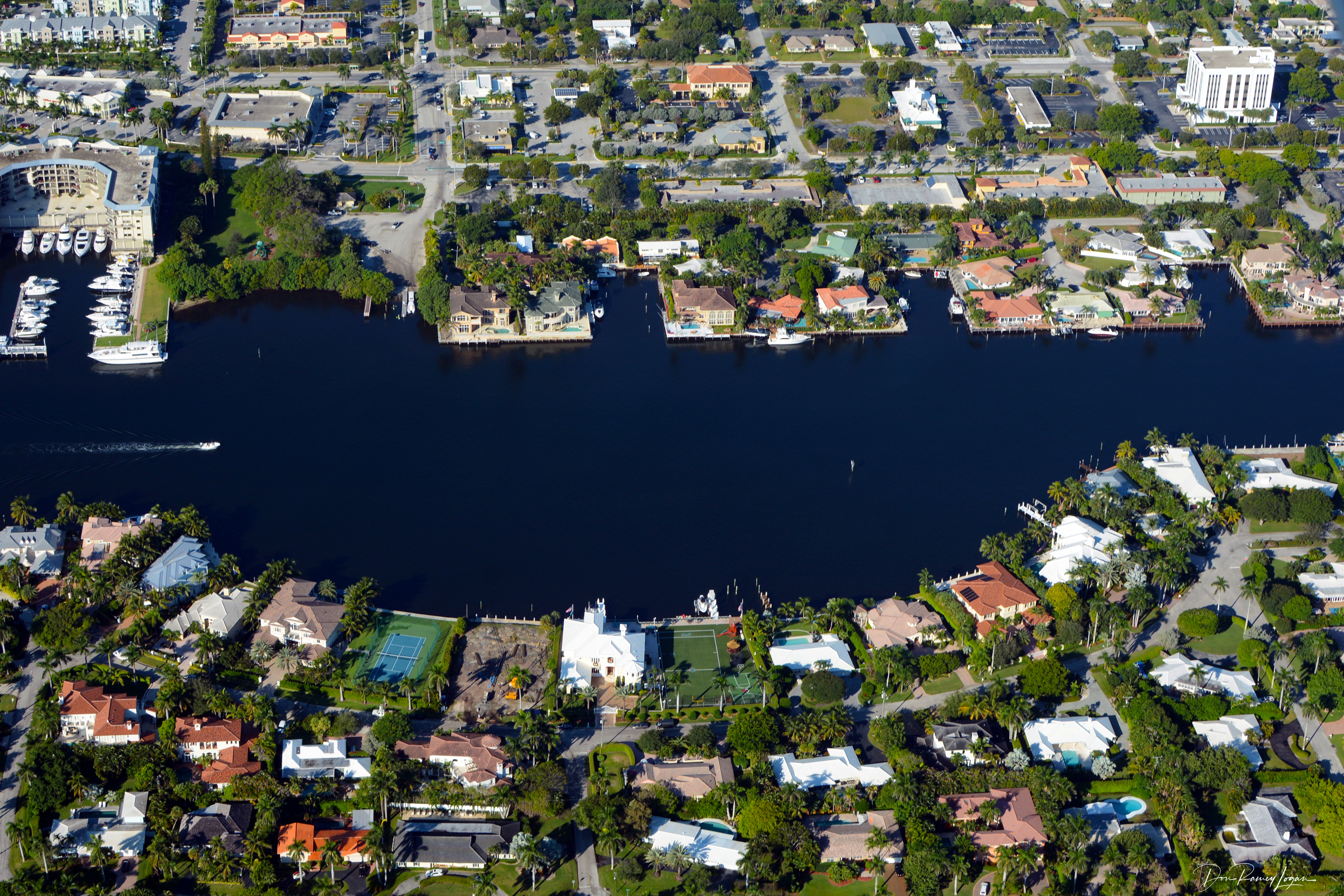
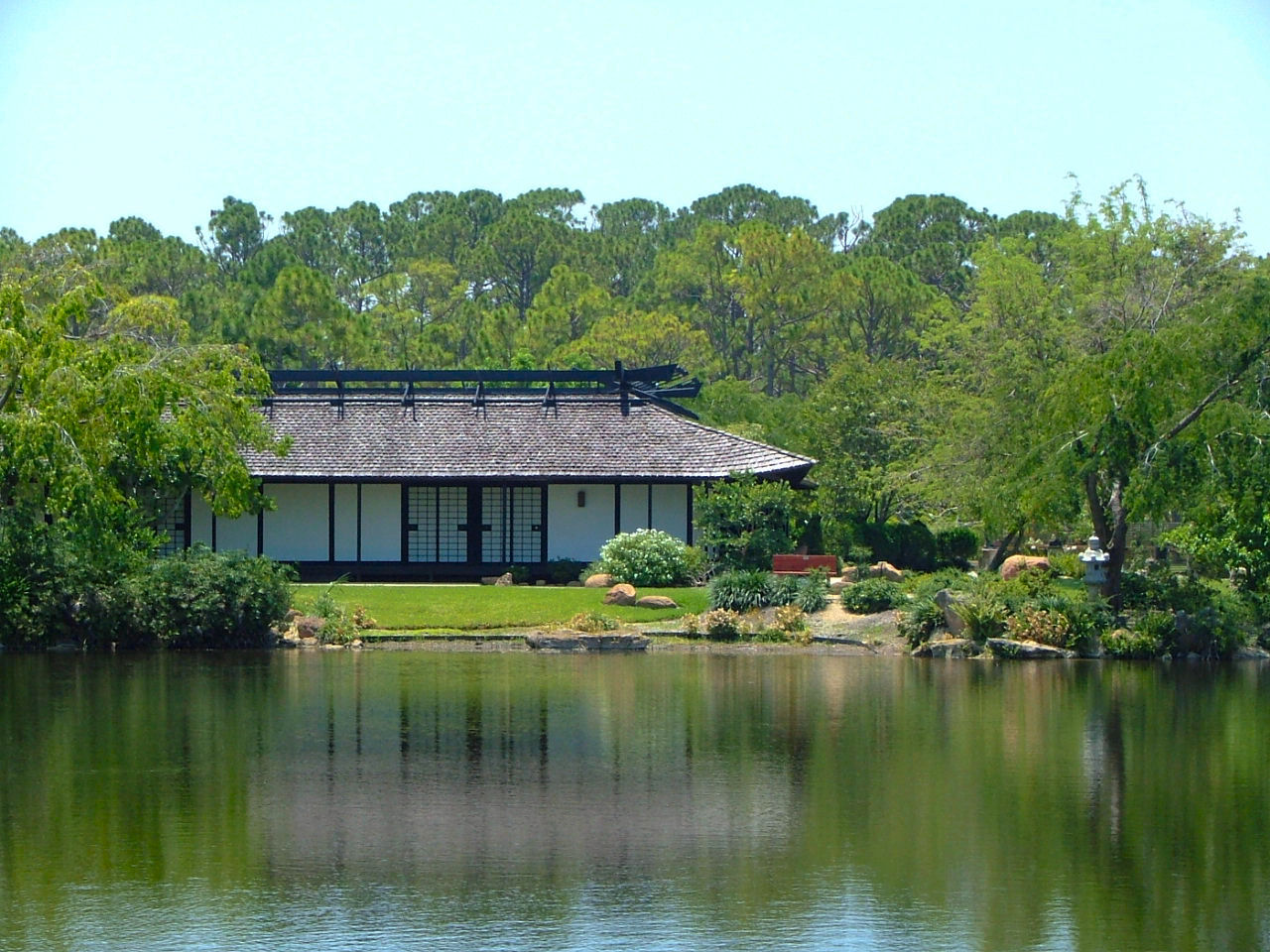
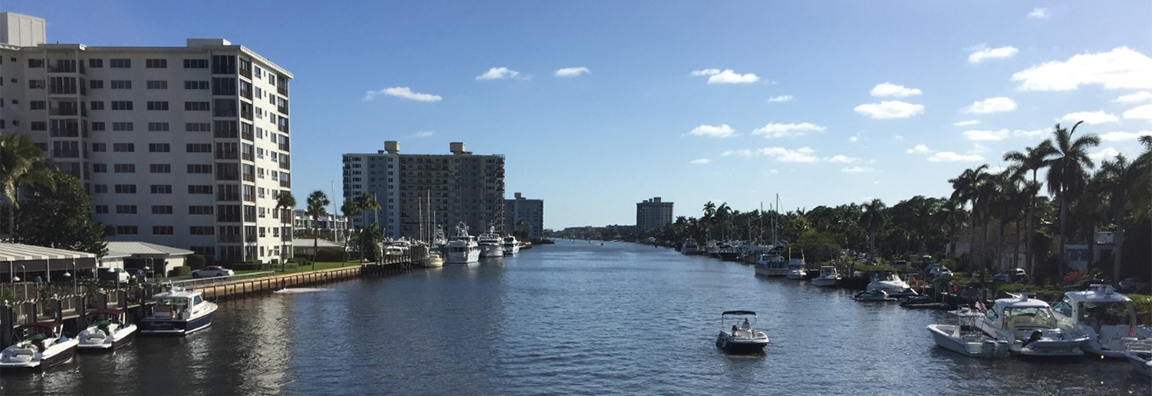
- From top to bottom; left to right: Downtown, aerial view, Morikami Museum and Japanese Gardens, Intracoastal Waterway

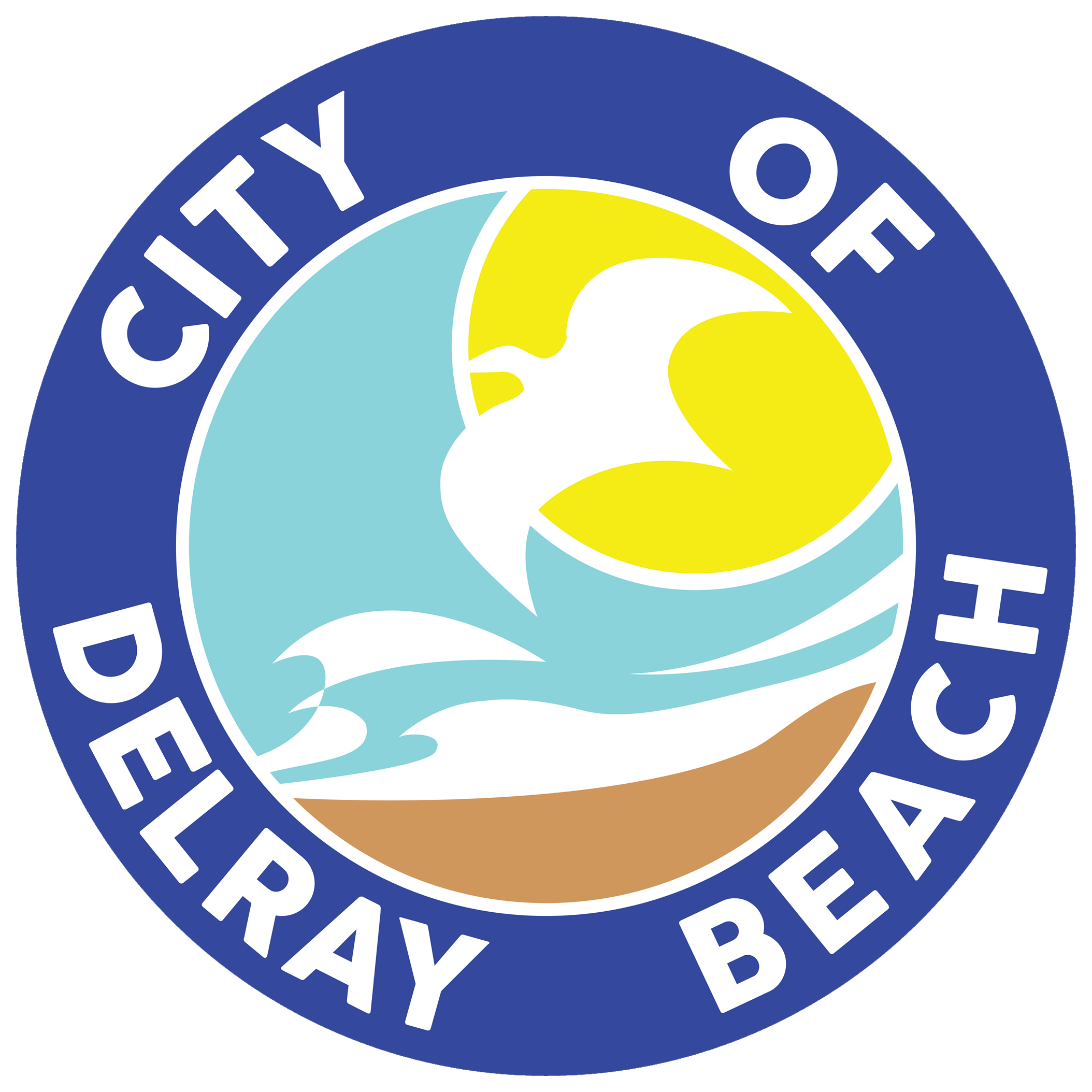
- Flag Seal
- Nickname: Delray
- Motto: "Village By The Sea"
- Interactive map of Delray Beach, Florida
- Location in the United States Delray Beach (Florida)
- Coordinates: 26°26′40″N 80°06′35″W
- Country: United States
- State: Florida
- County: Palm Beach
- Settled (Linton Settlement): 1884–1900
- Settled (Delray Settlement): 1901–1910
- Incorporated (Town of Delray): October 9, 1911
- Incorporated (Town of Delray Beach): October 9, 1923
- Incorporated (City of Delray Beach): May 11, 1927
- Named for: Delray, Detroit

Government
  - Type: Commission-Manager

Area
  - Total: 16.52 sq mi (42.78 km^{2})
  - Land: 15.92 sq mi (41.24 km^{2})
  - Water: 0.59 sq mi (1.54 km^{2})
- Elevation: 16 ft (4.9 m)

Population (2020)
  - Total: 66,846
  - Density: 4,197.7/sq mi (1,620.74/km^{2})
- (* Population density is rounded up and calculated from 2020 Census Population. It is not supplied by cited reference)
- Time zone: UTC-5 (Eastern (EST))
  - Summer (DST): UTC-4 (EDT)
- ZIP codes: 33444–33448, 33482–33484
- Area codes: 561, 728
- FIPS code: 12-17100
- GNIS feature ID: 2404212
- Website: www.delraybeachfl.gov

Delray Beach is a city in Palm Beach County, Florida, United States, and is a principal city in the Miami metropolitan area located 52 miles (83 km) north of Miami. The population of the city was 66,846 in 2020.

== History ==
=== Early years ===
The earliest known human inhabitants of what is now Delray Beach were the Jaega people. Tequesta Indians likely passed through or inhabited the area at various times. Few other recorded details of these local indigenous settlements have survived.

An 1841 U.S. military map shows a Seminole camp located in the area now known as Lake Ida. In 1876, the United States Life Saving Service built the Orange Grove House of Refuge to rescue and shelter ship-wrecked sailors. The house derived its name from the grove of mature sour orange and other tropical fruit trees found at the site chosen for the house of refuge, but no record or evidence of who planted the trees was discovered.

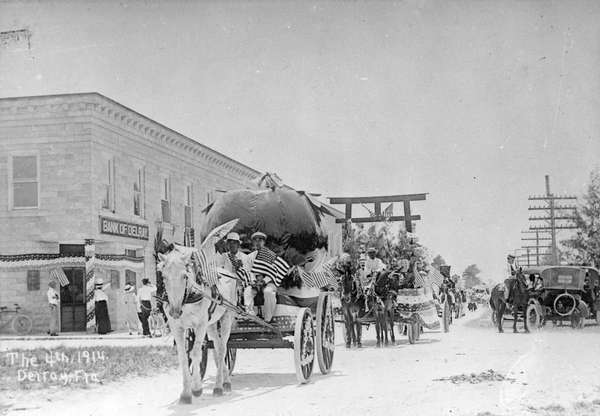
Independence Day parade, July 4, 1914

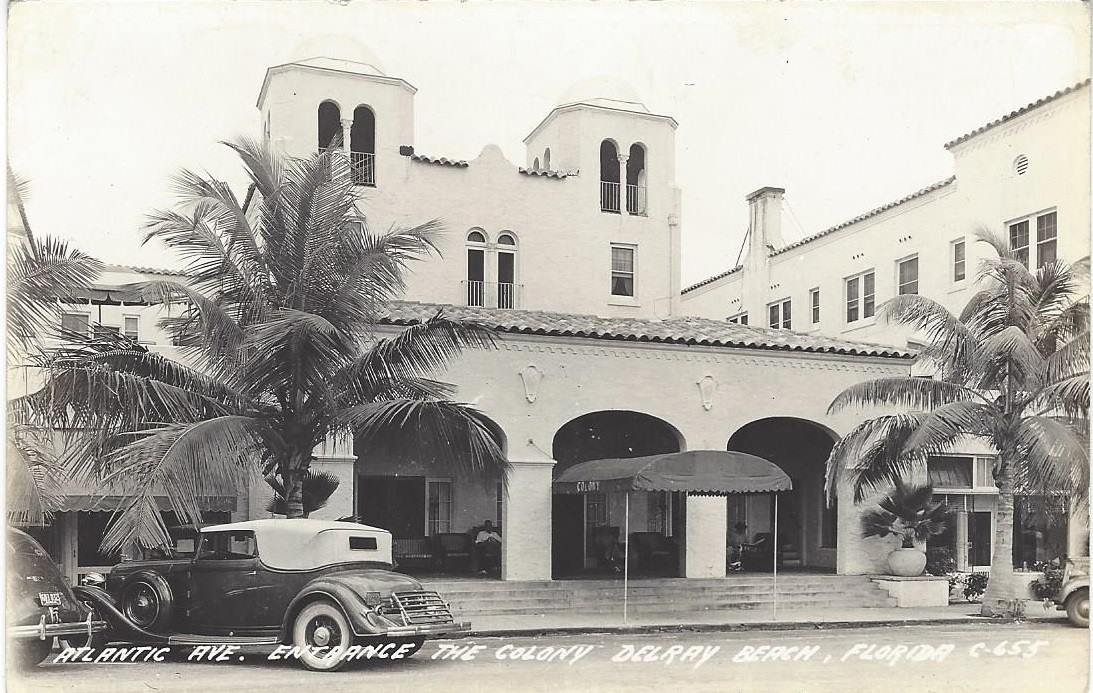
The Colony Hotel, built in 1926, was designed by architect Martin L. Hampton.

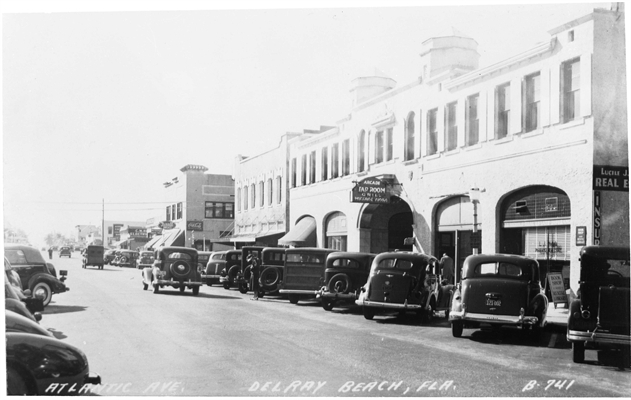
The Arcade Tap Room was a gathering place for Delray's Artists and Writers Colony from the mid-1920s to the 1950s.

The first nonindigenous group to build a settlement was a party of African Americans from the panhandle of Florida, who purchased land a little inland from the Orange Grove House of Refuge and began farming around 1884. By 1894, the black community was large enough to establish the first school in the area.

In 1894, William S. Linton, a Republican U.S. Congressman for Saginaw, Michigan, bought a tract of land west of the Orange Grove House of Refuge, and began selling plots in what he hoped would become a farming community. This community was named after Linton. In 1896, Henry Flagler extended his Florida East Coast Railroad south from West Palm Beach to Miami, with a station at Linton.

The Linton settlers established a post office and a store and began to achieve success with truck farming of winter vegetables for the northern market. A hard freeze in 1898 was a setback, and many of the settlers left, including William Linton. Partly in an attempt to change the community's luck, or to leave behind a bad reputation, the settlement's name was changed in 1901 to Delray, after the Detroit neighborhood of Delray ("Delray" being the anglicized spelling of Del Rey, which is Spanish for "of the king"), which in turn was named after the Mexican–American War's Battle of Molino del Rey.

Settlers from the Bahamas (then part of the British West Indies), sometimes referred to as Nassaws, began arriving in the early 1900s. After 1905, newspaper articles and photographs of Delray events reveal that Japanese settlers from the nearby Yamato farming colony also began participating in Delray civic activities such as parades, going to the movies, and shopping. The 1910 census shows Delray as a town of 904 citizens. Twenty-four U.S. states and nine other countries are listed as the birthplace of its residents. Although still a small town, Delray had a diverse citizenry.

In 1911, the area was chartered by the state of Florida as an incorporated town. In the same year, pineapple- and tomato-canning plants were built. Pineapples became the primary crop of the area. This is reflected in the name of the present day Pineapple Grove neighborhood near downtown Delray Beach.

Prior to 1909, the Delray settlement land was in Dade County. That year, Palm Beach County was carved out of the northern portion of the region. In 1915, Palm Beach County and Dade County contributed nearly equal portions of land to create what is now Broward County between the two, leaving Delray situated within the southeastern portion of Palm Beach County.

By 1920, Delray's population had reached 1,051. In the 1920s, drainage of the Everglades west of Delray lowered the water table, making it harder to grow pineapples, while the extension of the Florida East Coast Railway to Key West resulted in competition from Cuban pineapples for the markets of the northern United States.

The Florida land boom of the 1920s brought renewed prosperity to Delray. Tourism and real estate speculation became important parts of the local economy. Delray issued bonds to raise money to install water and sewer lines, paved streets, and sidewalks. Several hotels were built. At that time, Delray was the largest town on the east coast of Florida between West Palm Beach and Fort Lauderdale. The collapse of the land boom in 1926 left Delray saddled with high bond debts and greatly reduced income from property taxes.

Delray was separated from the Atlantic Ocean beach by the Florida East Coast Canal (now part of the Intracoastal Waterway). In 1923, the area between the canal and the ocean was incorporated as Delray Beach. In 1927, Delray and Delray Beach merged into one town named Delray Beach.

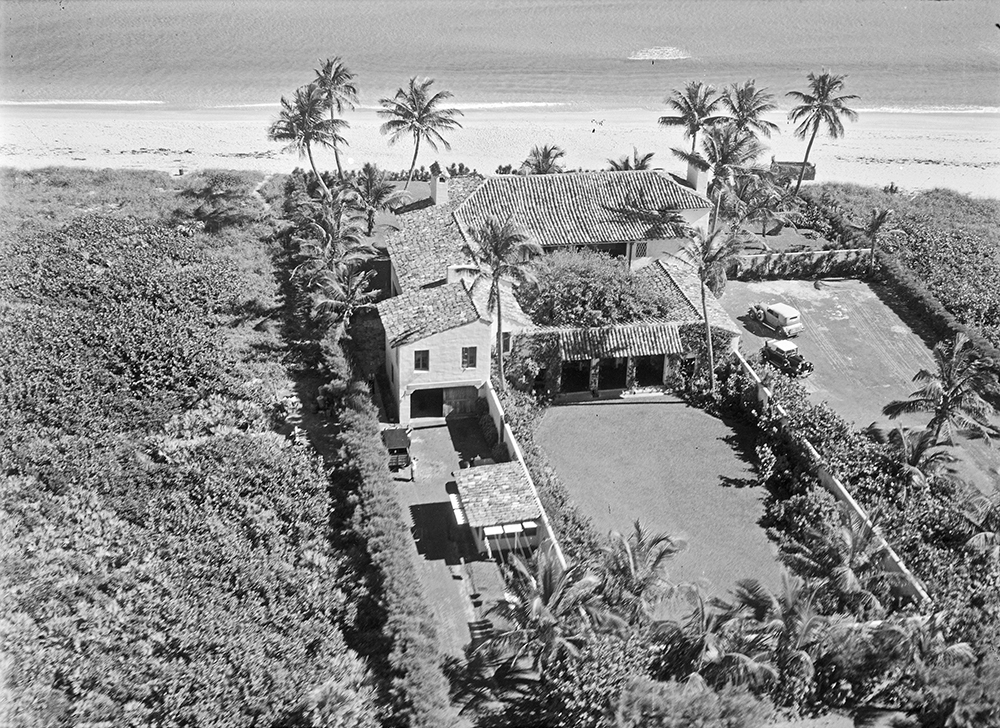
Estate at 1755 North Ocean Boulevard, January 26, 1933

Beginning in the mid-1920s, a seasonal artists and writers colony was established in Delray Beach and the adjacent town of Gulf Stream. At the time, the city of Palm Beach did not welcome Hollywood personalities or all types of artists, so the Delray winter colony drew a more eclectic and bohemian populace. Throughout the 1930s and 1940s, Delray became a popular winter enclave for artists and authors. Two nationally syndicated cartoonists – H.T. Webster (creator of "Caspar Milquetoast") and Fontaine Fox of "Toonerville Trolley" – had offices upstairs in the Arcade Building over the Arcade Tap Room, a gathering place where the artists and writers might be joined by aristocrats, politicians, entertainers, and sports figures. Other well-known artists and writers of the era who had homes in Delray Beach include Herb Roth, W.J. "Pat" Enright, Robert Bernstein, Wood Cowan, Denys Wortman, Jim Raymond, Charles Williams, Herb Niblick, Hugh McNair Kahler, Clarence Budington Kelland, Nina Wilcox Putnam, and Edna St. Vincent Millay. These seasonal visitors helped soften the effect of the real estate downturn and the Great Depression on the city.

During the Depression, not much money was available, since the two banks had failed, but progress continued, and the town still looked prosperous because of the previous burst of new buildings during the boom years. The artists and writers colony flourished and Delray Beach's fame as a resort town grew. This era is regarded as Delray Beach's "golden age of architecture", a period in which the city ranked 50th in population, but 10th in building permits in Florida. Prominent architectural styles in Delray Beach from this period include Art Deco, Mediterranean Revival, Mission Revival, Monterey Colonial, Streamline Moderne, bungalows, and Key West-style cottage homes for the colony's winter residents.

=== After World War II ===
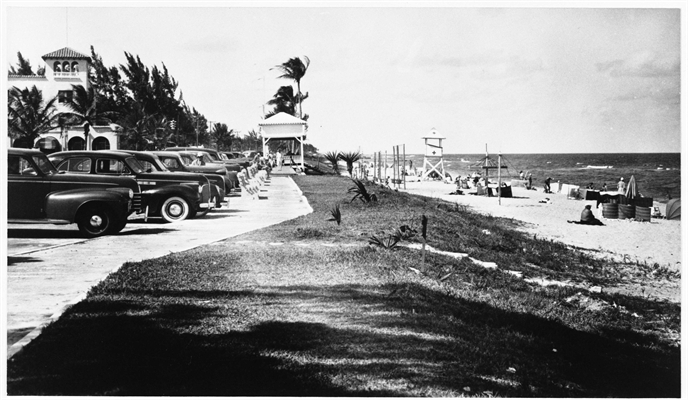
The Seacrest Hotel

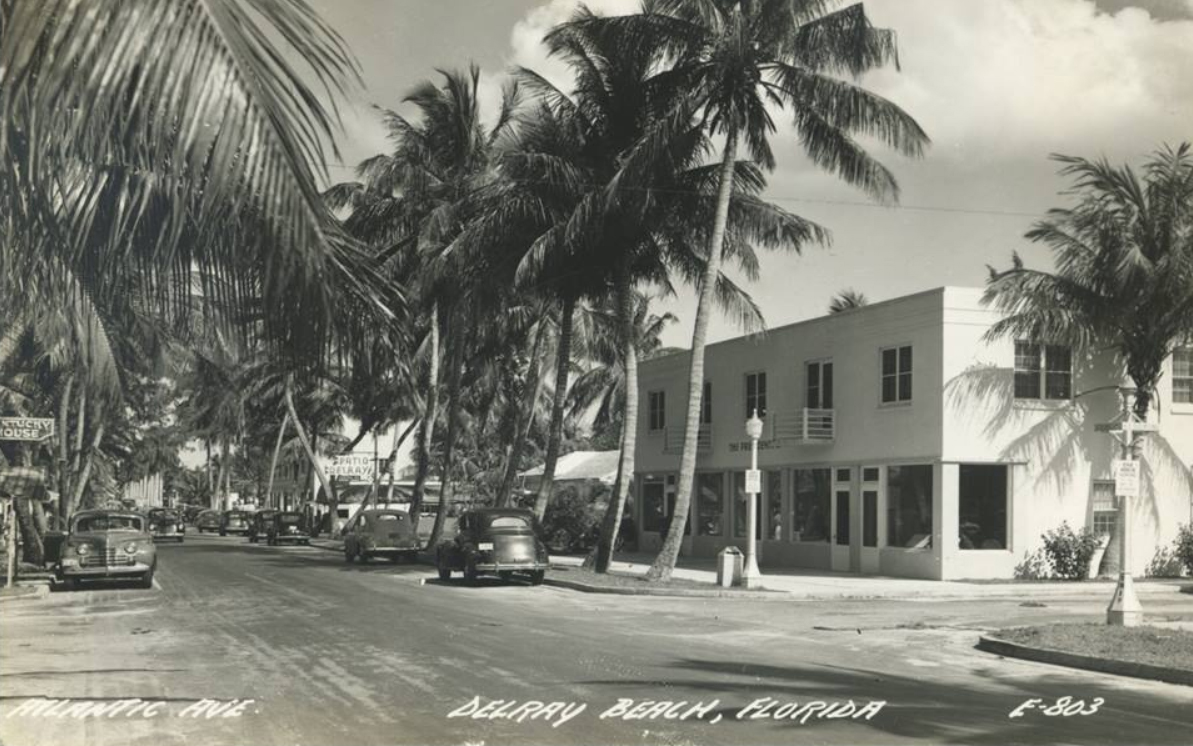
Atlantic Avenue, mid-20th century

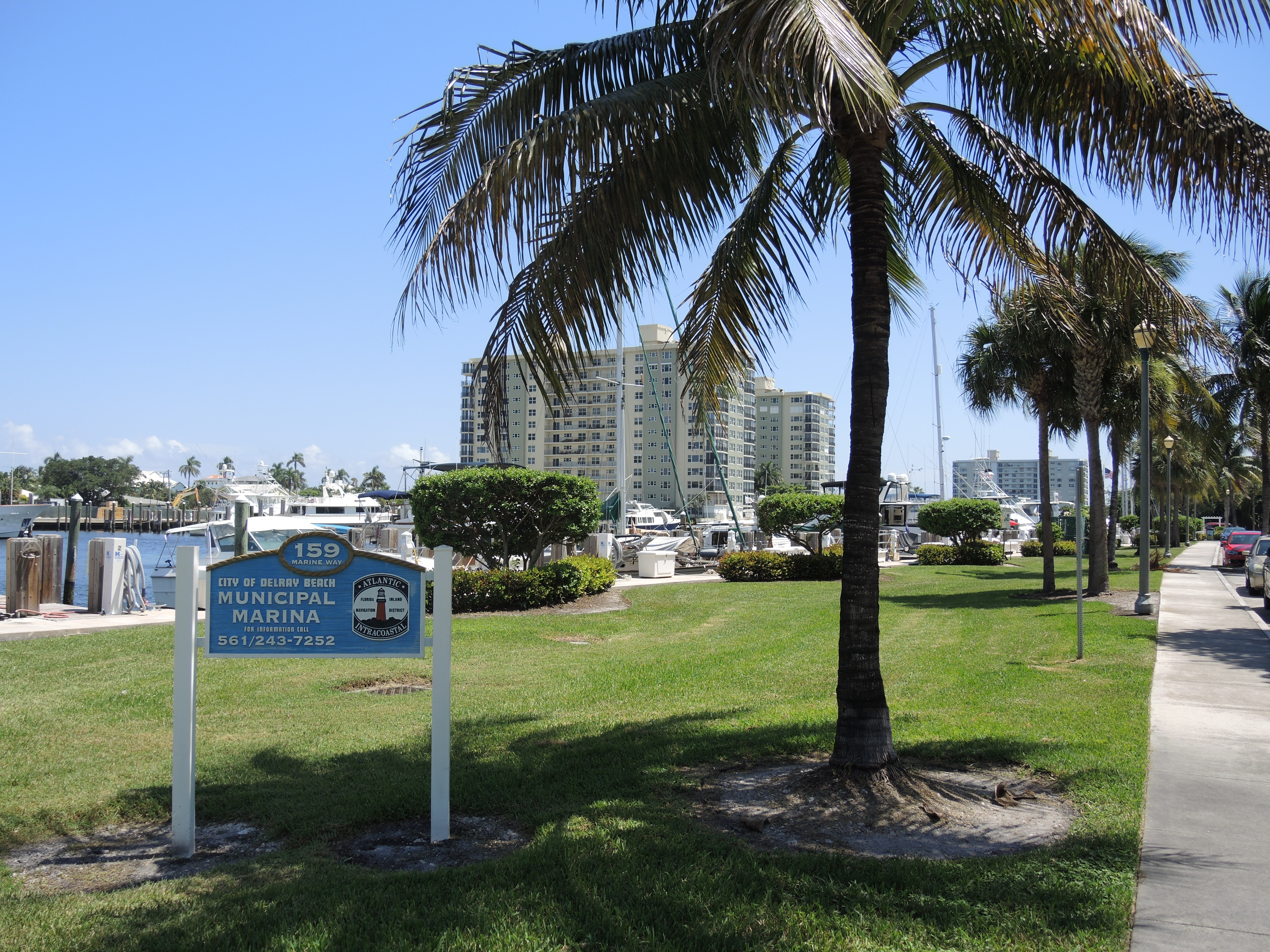
Marina Historic District, listed in the U.S. National Register of Historic Places, 2014

For the four years of World War II, citizens of Delray Beach volunteered to watch the beach and ocean 24 hours a day from the faux bell tower atop the seaside Seacrest Hotel. Military personnel patrolled the beach on horseback. Shipping attacks could be seen from the coast. During World War II, Delray Beach also had an influx of service personnel stationed at the nearby Boca Raton Army Airfield. Some of the veterans who had trained at the airfield returned to settle in Delray Beach after the war. Steady growth of the city continued through the 1950s and 1960s.

While Delray Beach had a sizeable African-American population from the beginning, it attempted to keep out Jews. In 1959, the Anti-Defamation League of B'nai B'rith called it "one of the nation's most completely anti-Semitic communities". It quoted an unnamed realtor who "proudly called it the only city on the East Coast [of Florida] fully restricted to Gentiles both in buying and selling".

By the early 1960s, Delray Beach was becoming known for surfing. Atlantic Avenue was the biggest seller of surfboards in Florida at the time. Delray Beach's surfing fame increased somewhat serendipitously after a 1965 shipwreck. During Hurricane Betsy, the 441-foot (134 m) freighter Amaryllis ran aground on Singer Island, creating a windbreak that formed perfectly breaking waves. The ship was dismantled three years later, yet local surfers have retained an association with the area.

In the 1970s, Interstate 95 between Palm Beach Gardens and Miami was fully completed and development began to spread west of the city limits. This pattern continued and accelerated through the 1980s, as downtown and many of the older neighborhoods fell into a period of economic decline.

Revitalization of some historic areas began during the last decade of the 20th century, as several local landmark structures were renovated. These include the Colony Hotel and Old School Square (the former campus of Delray Elementary School and Delray High School, since turned into a cultural center). The city also established five Historic Districts, listed in the Local Register of Historic Places, and annexed several other historic residential neighborhoods between U.S. Route 1 and the Intracoastal Waterway in an effort to preserve some of the distinctive local architecture.

In 2001, the historic home of teacher/principal Solomon D. Spady was renovated and turned into the Spady Cultural Heritage Museum. The Spady Museum houses black archives. In 2007, the museum was expanded by renovating a 1935 cottage as a Kid's Cultural Clubhouse, and the construction of a 50-seat amphitheater named for C. Spencer Pompey, a pioneer black educator.

Downtown Delray, located in the eastern part of the city, along Atlantic Avenue, east of I-95 and stretching to the beach, has undergone a large-scale renovation and gentrification. The Delray Beach Tennis Center has brought business to the area. It has hosted several major international tennis events such as the April 2005 Fed Cup (USA vs. Belgium), the April 2004 Davis Cup (USA vs. Sweden), the Delray Beach International Tennis Championships (ATP event), and the Chris Evert/Bank of America Pro-Celebrity event.

Atlantic Community High School was rebuilt in 2005 on a different site from the previous school, a plan which was met with much contention.

When DayJet operated from 2007 to 2008, its headquarters were in Delray Beach.

From 2009 to 2012, Pet Airways had its headquarters in Delray Beach.

In 2012, Rand McNally "Best of the Road" named Delray Beach America's Most Fun Small Town. Delray Beach was rated as the 3rd Happiest Seaside Town in America by Coastal Living in 2015. Delray Beach won the title of Best Beach in Florida in the USA Today 2024 Readers' Choice Awards.

=== Opioid epidemic ===
Delray Beach has experienced a drastic spike in opioid overdoses in recent years, reaching record numbers in 2016 and 2017. The number reached its pinnacle of 96 in October 2016. Most overdoses are a result of heroin mixed with fentanyl. This is due to the high concentration of halfway houses throughout the city.

== Geography ==
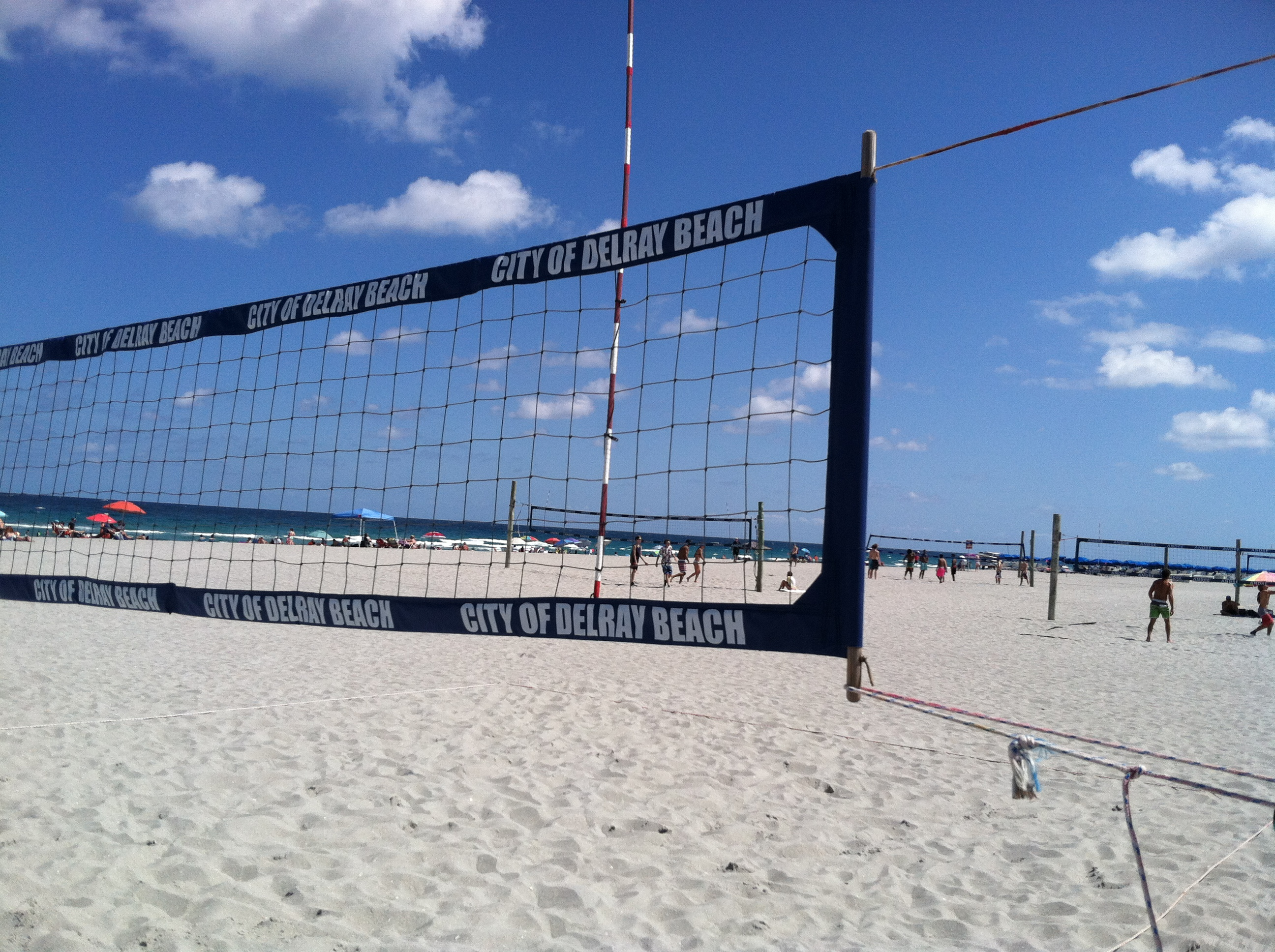
Delray Municipal Beach, 2015

- The city's eastern boundary includes 3 miles (4.8 km) of beachfront along the Atlantic Ocean.
- Directly to the south, the city is bordered by Boca Raton.
- To the south and southeast, the city is bordered by Highland Beach on the same barrier island east of the Intracoastal Waterway.
- Directly to the north, the city is bordered by Boynton Beach.
- To the north and northeast, the city is bordered by Gulf Stream on the barrier island and along a section of mainland east of U.S. Route 1.
- To the west, an urbanized area that includes High Point, Kings Point, Villages of Oriole, and multiple gated communities extends from the city's western boundary to the Loxahatchee National Wildlife Refuge portion of the Everglades. Many residences and businesses within this suburban corridor of unincorporated Palm Beach County possess a Delray Beach postal address despite technically lying outside the city limits. This area is sometimes referred to collectively and informally as "West Delray."

Delray Beach's location in southeastern Palm Beach County is in the middle of Florida's Gold Coast region.

According to the United States Census Bureau, the city of Delray Beach has a total land area of 15.81 miles (25.44 km).

=== Downtown location ===
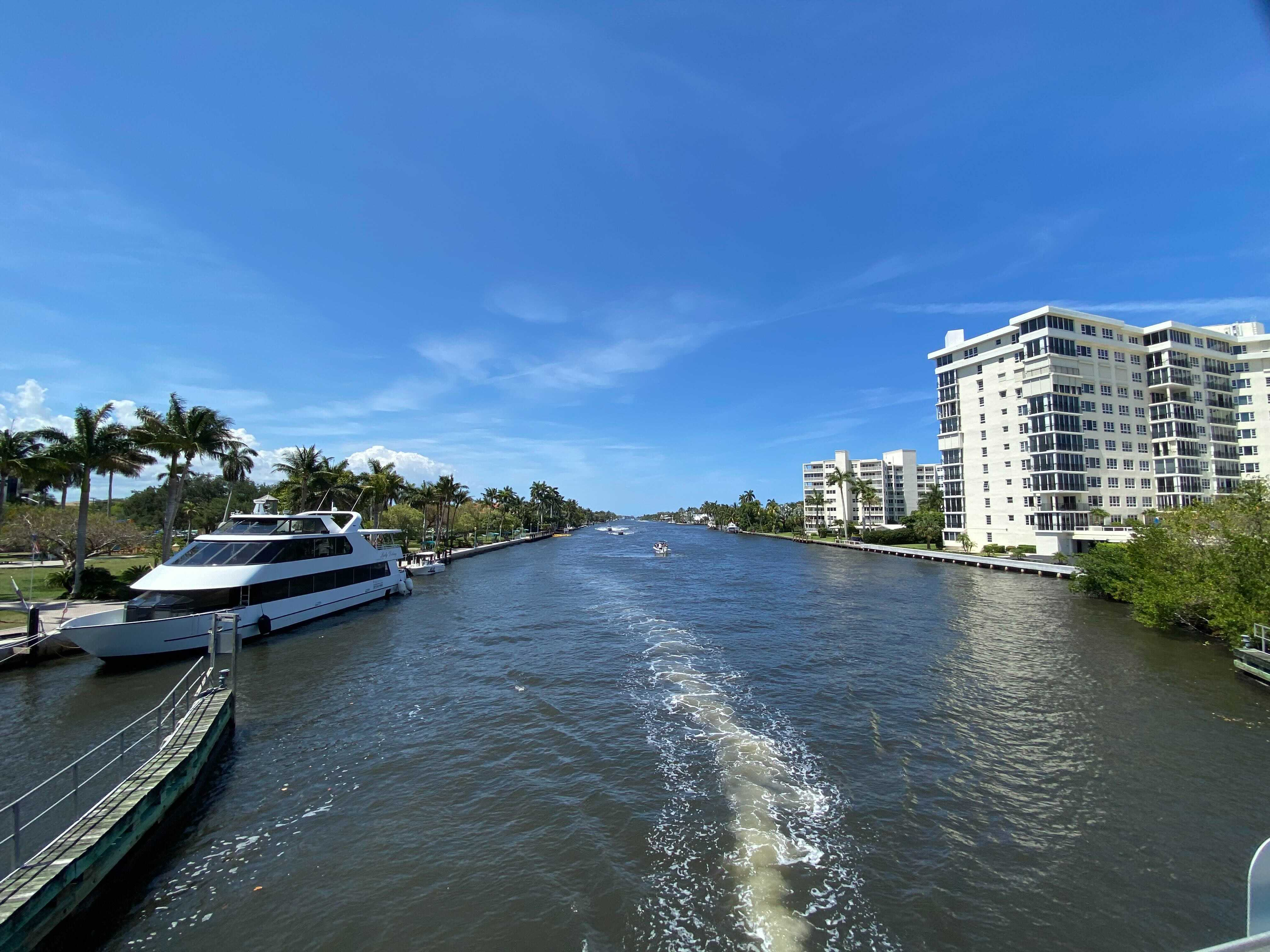
View of the Intracoastal Waterway from the Atlantic Avenue bridge

In earlier years, downtown Delray was centered along Atlantic Avenue as far west as Swinton Avenue and as far east as the intracoastal waterway. Downtown has since expanded. By 2010, downtown extended west to I-95 and east as the Atlantic Ocean; The north–south boundaries extend roughly two blocks north and south of Atlantic Avenue.

=== Climate ===
Delray Beach has a tropical climate, more specifically a tropical trade-wind rainforest climate (Köppen Af), as its driest month (February) averages 2.55 inches (64.8 mm) of rainfall, meeting the minimum standard of 2.4 inches or 60 millimeters in the driest month needed to qualify for that designation.

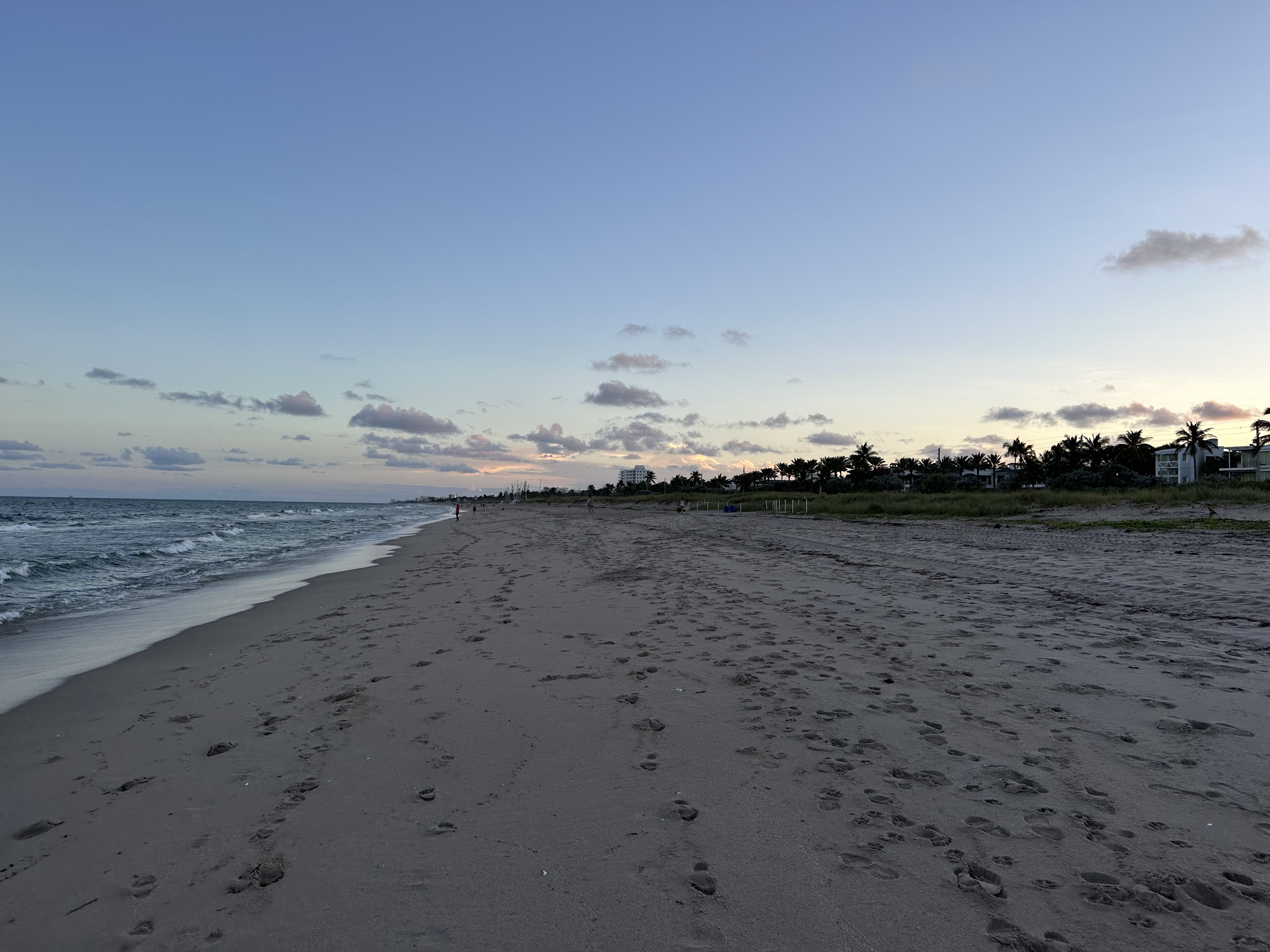
Coastline of Delray Beach facing southwards

Delray Beach has hot and humid summers. High summertime temperatures range from 87 to 93 °F (30.6 to 33.9 °C) with low temperatures falling to around 75–78 °F (23.9–25.6 °C). Winters are warm and constitute a marked drier season. Ordinarily, wintertime high temperatures are in the range of 74–83 °F (23.3–28.3 °C) and low temperatures are between 57 and 65 °F (13.9 and 18.3 °C). However, when occasional cold fronts hit South Florida, daytime high temperatures may only reach the low or mid 60s (°F). Overnight lows during these brief periods can sink into the 40s. These cold fronts do not typically last more than a day or two and only occur a few times each winter. Delray Beach's near sea-level elevation, coastal location, position above the Tropic of Cancer, and proximity to the Gulf Stream shapes its climate. Hurricane season officially runs from June 1 through November 30, although hurricanes can develop outside those dates. The most likely time for hurricane activity is during the peak of the Cape Verde season, which is mid-August through the end of September. Delray Beach has received direct or near-direct hits from hurricanes in 1903, 1906, 1928, 1947, 1949, 1964, 1965, 1979, 1992, 1999, 2004, and 2005.

Climate data for Delray Beach
Month	Jan	Feb	Mar	Apr	May	Jun	Jul	Aug	Sep	Oct	Nov	Dec	Year
Mean daily maximum °F (°C)	76 (24)	77 (25)	79 (26)	82 (28)	86 (30)	89 (32)	90 (32)	90 (32)	88 (31)	85 (29)	80 (27)	76 (24)	83 (28)
Mean daily minimum °F (°C)	58 (14)	59 (15)	62 (17)	66 (19)	71 (22)	74 (23)	76 (24)	76 (24)	75 (24)	72 (22)	66 (19)	60 (16)	67 (19)
Average rainfall inches (mm)	3.75 (95)	2.55 (65)	3.68 (93)	3.57 (91)	5.39 (137)	7.58 (193)	5.97 (152)	6.65 (169)	8.10 (206)	5.46 (139)	5.55 (141)	3.14 (80)	61.39 (1,559)
Average rainy days	8.8	7.8	8.8	7.4	9.8	16.9	16.9	18.1	17.7	13	9.4	8.9	143.4

== Demographics ==
Historical population
Census	Pop.	Note	%±
1910	904		—
1920	1,051		16.3%
1930	2,333		122.0%
1940	3,737		60.2%
1950	6,312		68.9%
1960	12,230		93.8%
1970	19,366		58.3%
1980	34,329		77.3%
1990	47,789		39.2%
2000	60,020		25.6%
2010	60,522		0.8%
2020	66,846		10.4%
U.S. Decennial Census

=== Racial and ethnic composition ===
Delray Beach racial composition (Hispanics excluded from racial categories) (NH = Non-Hispanic)
Race	Pop 2010	Pop 2020	% 2010	% 2020
White (NH)	35,844	38,341	59.22%	57.36%
Black or African American (NH)	16,759	16,823	27.69%	25.17%
Native American or Alaska Native (NH)	87	81	0.14%	0.12%
Asian (NH)	1,088	1,281	1.80%	1.92%
Pacific Islander or Native Hawaiian (NH)	27	16	0.04%	0.02%
Some other race (NH)	196	406	0.32%	0.61%
Two or more races/Multiracial (NH)	752	2,131	1.24%	3.19%
Hispanic or Latino (any race)	5,769	7,767	9.53%	11.62%
Total	60,522	66,846		

=== 2020 census ===
As of the 2020 census, Delray Beach had a population of 66,846. The median age was 49.5 years; 13.5% of the residents were under 18 and 26.9% were 65 or older. For every 100 females, there were 92.8 males, and for every 100 females 18 and over, there were 90.7 males 18 and over.

All of the residents lived in urban areas, while none lived in rural areas.

Of the 31,203 households in Delray Beach, 16.7% had children under18 living in them, 35.3% were married-couple households, 22.8% were households with a male householder and no spouse or partner present, and 34.5% were households with a female householder and no spouse or partner present. About 38.6% of all households were made up of individuals, and 18.1% had someone living alone who was 65 years of age or older.

The city had 38,011 housing units, of which 17.9% were vacant. The homeowner vacancy rate was 2.3% and the rental vacancy rate was 8.5%.

Racial composition as of the 2020 census
Race	Number	Percentage
White	40,174	60.1%
Black or African American	17,031	25.5%
American Indian and Alaska Native	213	0.3%
Asian	1,293	1.9%
Native Hawaiian and other Pacific Islander	24	0.0%
Some other race	2,444	3.7%
Two or more races	5,667	8.5%
Hispanic or Latino (of any race)	7,767	11.6%

=== 2010 census ===
As of the 2010 United States census, 60,522 people, 27,116 households, and 14,211 families were residing in the city.

=== 2000 census ===
As of 2000, 18.9% of households had children under 18 living with them, 42.4% were married couples living together, 10.2% had a female householder with no husband present, and 43.7% were non-families. About 35.3% of all households were made up of individuals, and 18.3% had someone living alone who was 65 or older. The average household size was 2.22, and the average family size was 2.87.

In 2000, the age distribution was 18.2% under 18, 6.3% from 18 to 24, 27.1% from 25 to 44, 22.4% from 45 to 64, and 25.9% who were 65 or older. The median age was 44 years. For every 100 females, there were 91.2 males. For every 100 females 18 and over, there were 88.0 males.

In 2000, the median income in the city for a household was $43,371 and for a family was $51,195. Males had a median income of $33,699 versus $28,469 for females. The per capita income for the city was $29,350. About 8.2% of families and 11.8% of the population were below the poverty line, including 17.6% of those under 18 and 7.8% of those 65 or over.

As of 2000, speakers of English as a first language accounted for 75.44% of all residents, and French Creole accounted for 11.73%, Spanish consisted of 7.02%, French was at 1.87%, Italian at 0.88%, and German made up 0.75% of the population.

As of 2000, Delray Beach had the 16th-highest percentage of Haitian residents in the U.S., with 10.5% of the population.

== Economy ==
Delray Beach is one of South Florida's most popular beach destinations. The area is noted for its restaurants, retail shops, nightclubs, art galleries, and hotels. East Atlantic Avenue is in particular is noted for its nightlife, dining, and shopping. One of the city's most prominent commercial centers is Delray Beach Market, a food hall and event venue which is Florida's largest. Open since 2021, the opening ceremony was attended by Florida governor Ron DeSantis, though is closed temporarily for the first half of 2023 to make room for newer constructions.

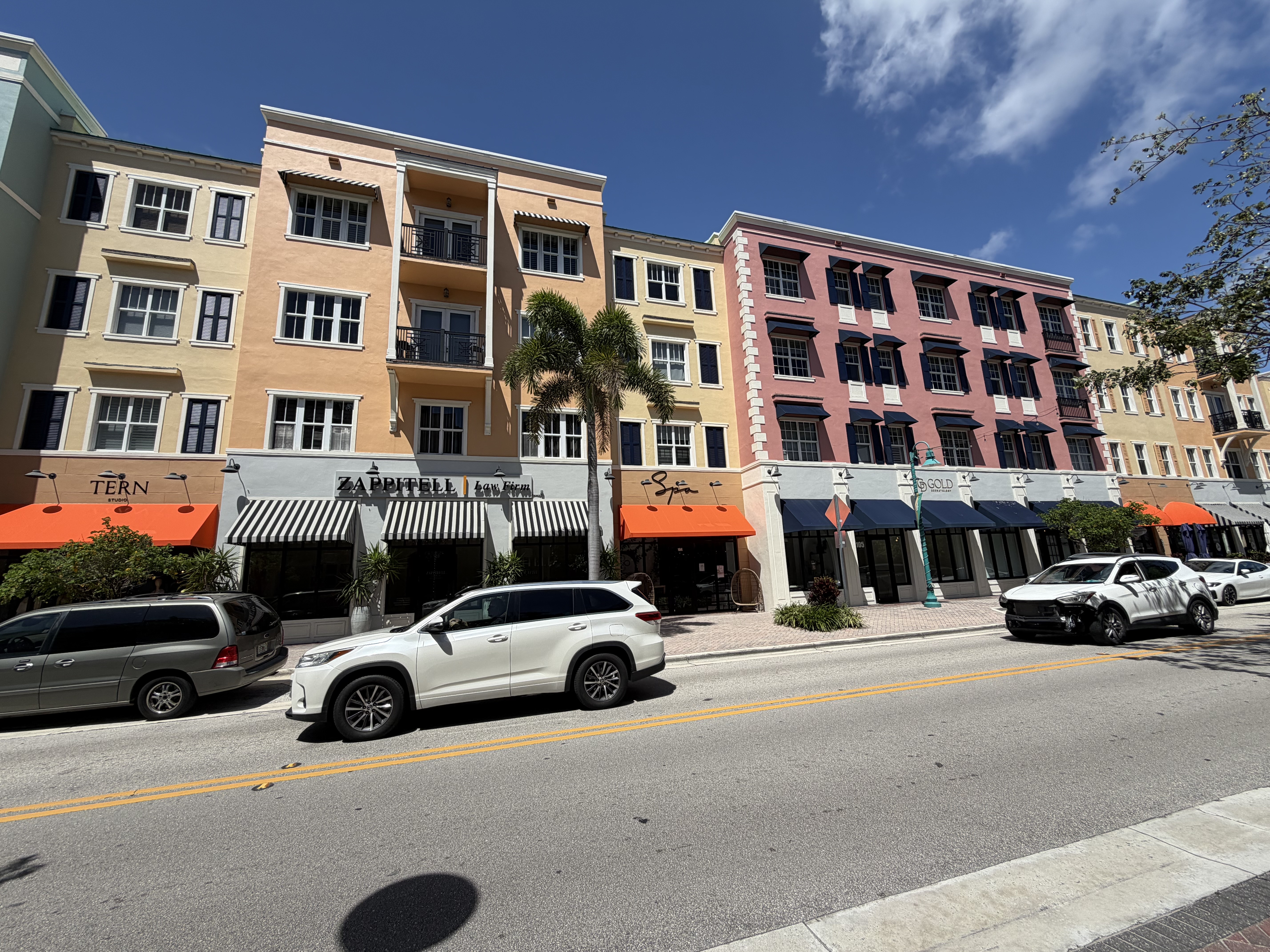
Business and condo buildings on NE 2nd Ave in Delray Beach

=== Recent development ===
Downtown Delray Beach has had a building boom since roughly 2003. Recent development reflects trends of New Urbanism downtown, and mansionization of waterfront property, sometimes creating pressures on Historic Districts and historic sites. New mixed-use development projects have recently been constructed, and more are planned, in the areas immediately north and south of Atlantic Avenue. To accommodate the anticipated growth the city has also built two new municipal parking garages.

=== Drug recovery programs ===
In 2007, an article in The New York Times labeled Delray Beach the drug recovery capital of the United States because it had one of the country's largest recovery communities and relative number of sober living houses. The local drug rehabilitation industry has received mixed reviews from addiction experts and is considered a public nuisance by some residents and city officials. Persistent complaints of health care fraud, insurance fraud, strain on public resources, and a perceived lack of adequate regulation and rehab facility inspections have received media coverage. In July 2017, several national news outlets, including The New York Times and NBC News, published investigative reports detailing fraud allegations within South Florida's billion-dollar drug rehab industry, focusing on Delray Beach's sober houses. At least 30 arrests for illegal "patient brokering" had been made between July 2016 and July 2017.

=== Top employers ===
According to Delray Beach's 2018–2019 Comprehensive Annual Financial Report, the top employers in the city are:

#	Employer	Number of employees
1	Delray Medical Center	1,280
2	School District of Palm Beach County	1,123
3	City of Delray Beach	838
4	Seo Every Where	600
5	Annco Services	400
6	Meisner Electric Inc of Florida	370
7	Ed Morse Delray Toyota	350
8	Shullman Technology Group	350
9	Pinecrest Rehabilitation Hospital	300
10	Schumacher Automotive Group	250

== Arts and culture ==
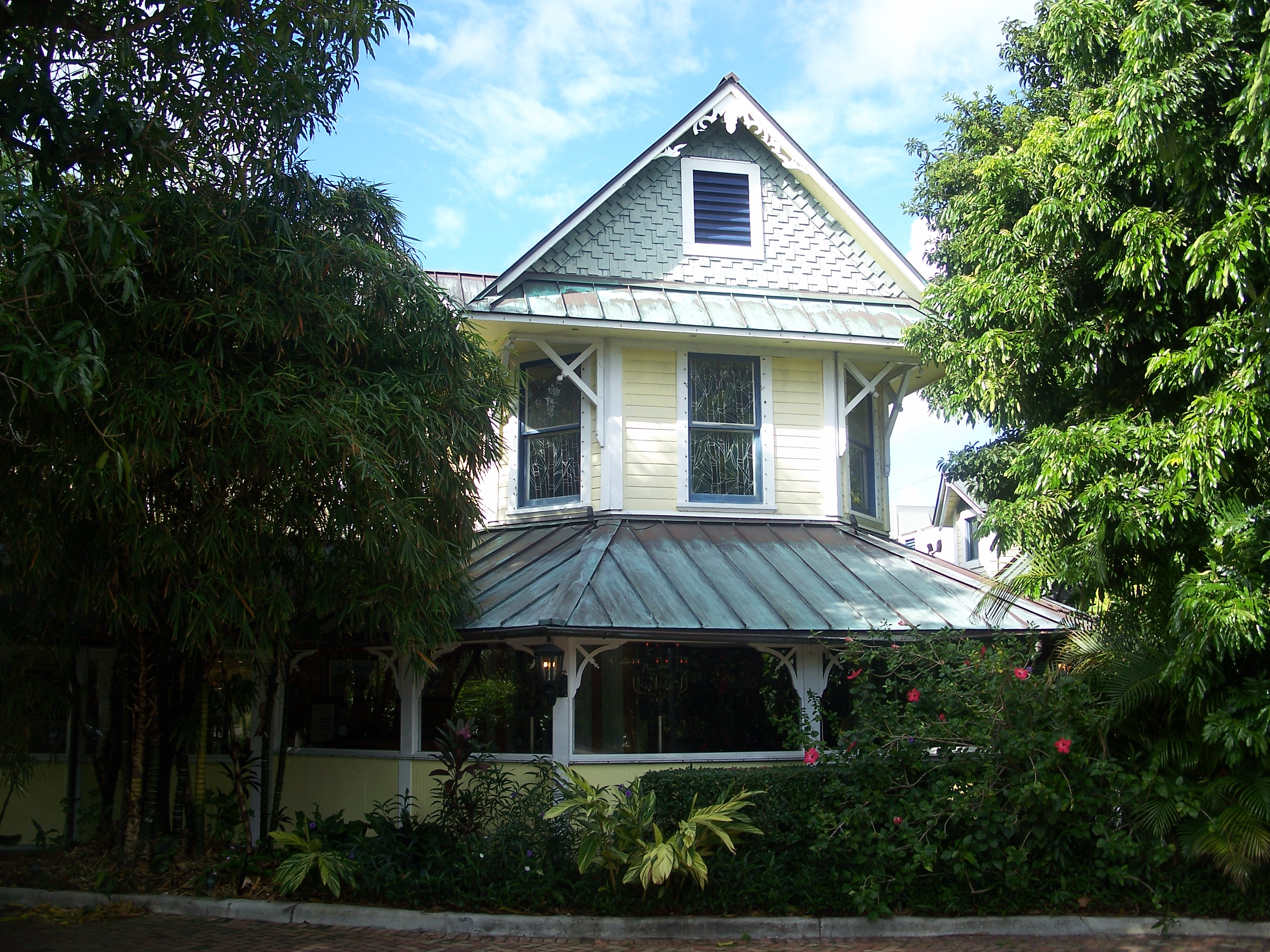
John and Elizabeth Shaw Sundy House, built in 1902, is listed in the U.S. Register of Historic Places.

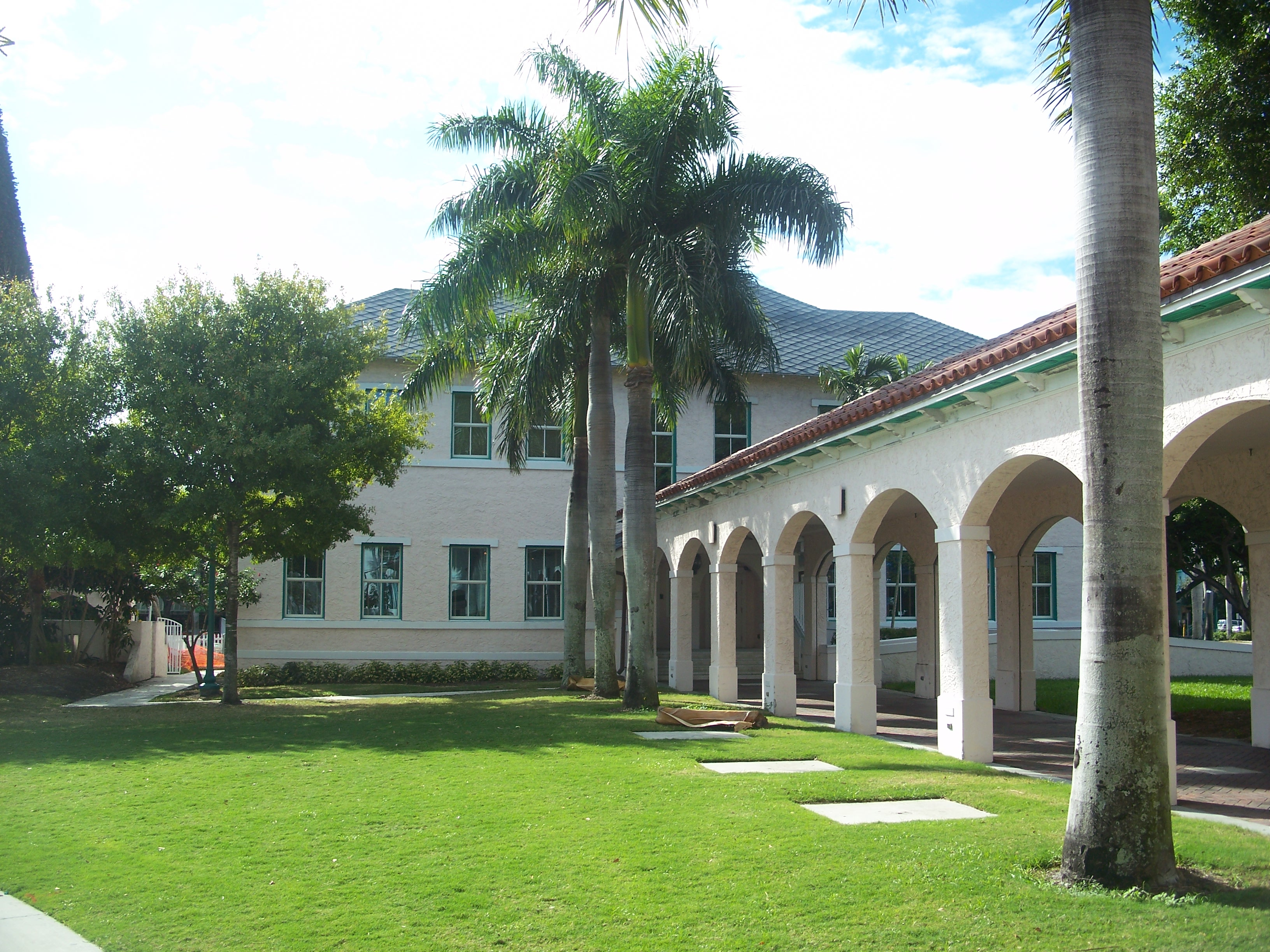
Cornell Art Museum now occupies part of the restored 1913 Delray School complex.

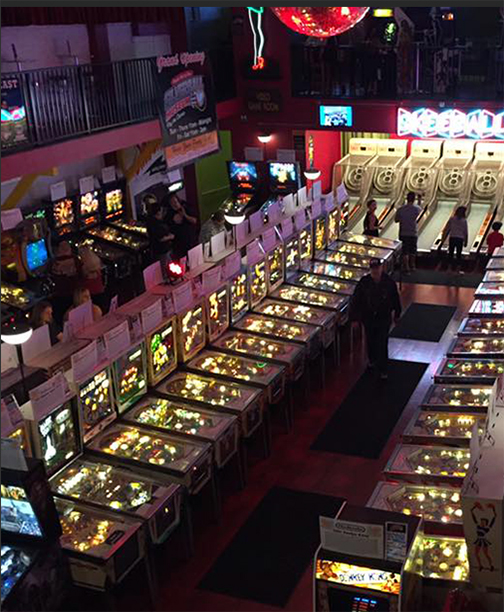
The first floor of the Silverball Museum

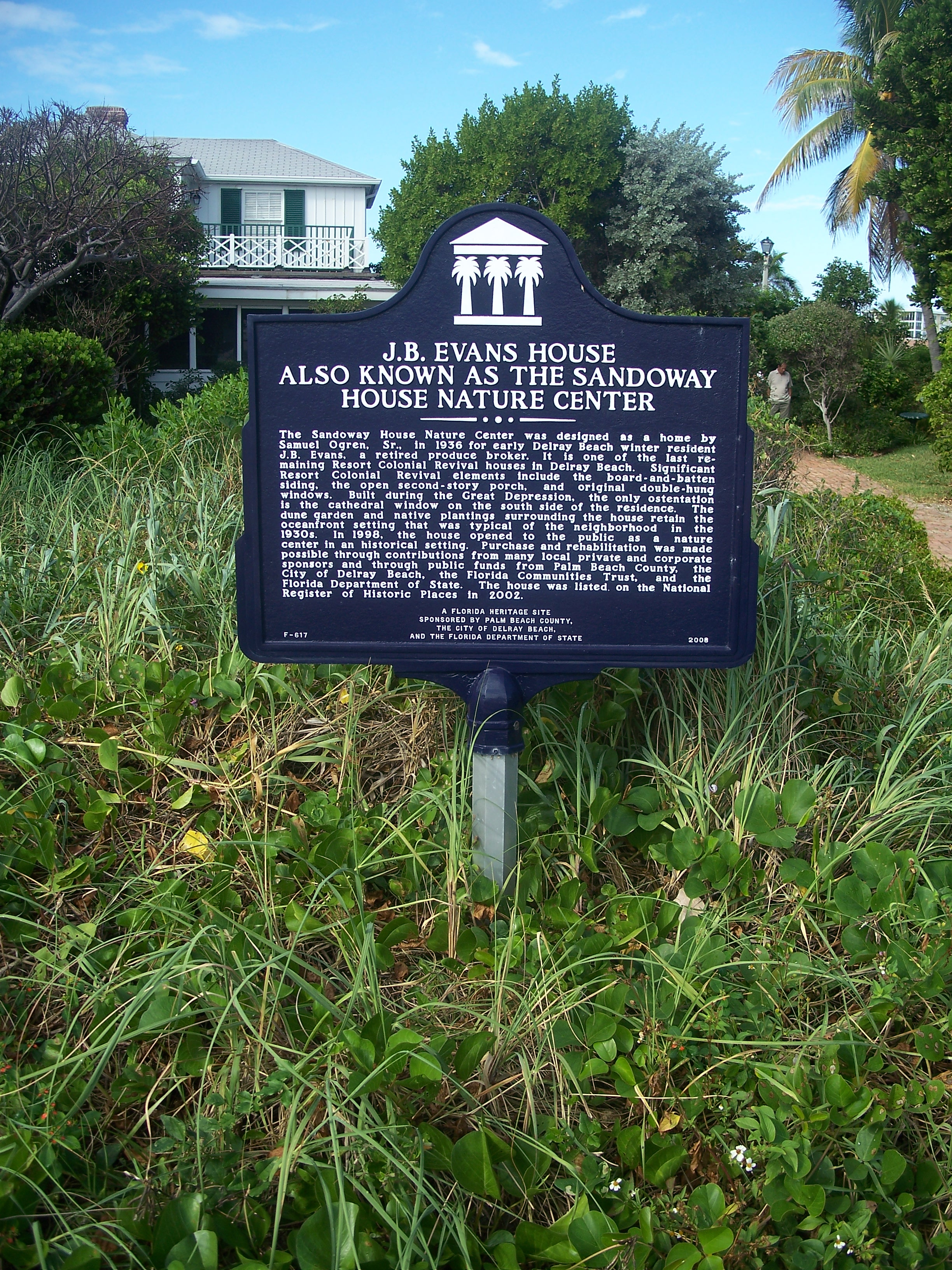
The J.B. Evans House, presently the home of the Sandoway Discovery Center, is listed the U.S. National Register of Historic Places.

The city has 2 miles (3.2 km) of public beach accessible from Florida State Road A1A. Travel Holiday magazine named Delray Municipal Beach as the top beach in the southeastern United States. The City of Delray Beach maintains five athletic fields, five beach and oceanfront parks, eight community parks, two intracoastal parks, a teen center and skatepark, a splash park, and a pool and tennis club, offering a variety of recreational activities and facilities.

=== Arts and music ===
Delray Beach also has a wide variety of venues for all types of art. The Pineapple Grove Arts District, located downtown north of Atlantic Avenue, is noted for its galleries, performance art, and cultural organizations. Arts Garage, a not-for-profit multi-media arts venue, hosts musical concerts, live theatre, arts education and outreach programs, and a visual art gallery. The Delray Beach Playhouse, which opened in 1947 in Lake Ida East Park, stages plays, musicals, interactive studio theatre, books on stage, children's theatre productions, classes and camps.

Old School Square, the former campus of Delray Elementary School and Delray High School, has since been converted into a cultural center. The Old School Square complex now comprises the Crest Theatre, a venue for the performing arts, in the former High School building; the 1925 Gymnasium, restored to maintain its appearance, which has since become a venue for local events such as wedding receptions and dances; the Cornell Art Museum, built in the restored Elementary School; and The Pavilion, which serves as an outdoor venue for musical performances and other events such as political rallies. The Creative Arts School offers beginner through master level art, photography, and writing classes for children and adults.

Atlantic Avenue is also a regular host for various art fairs and street festivals.

=== Delray Beach Public Library ===
The Delray Beach Public Library, founded in 1913, includes the Lynda Hunter and Virginia Kimmel Children's Library.

=== Non-art museums and nature ===
Some museums within Delray Beach have a more historical focus. Cason Cottage House Museum, once home to a family of Delray Beach pioneers, offers visitors a glimpse at daily life in South Florida from 1915 to 1935. The Museum is maintained and operated by the Delray Beach Historical Society. The historic home of teacher and later principal Solomon D. Spady was renovated and turned into the Spady Cultural Heritage Museum. The Spady Museum houses black archives and hosts exhibits and programs designed to recognize the efforts of blacks who were instrumental in shaping Delray Beach and Palm Beach County. In 2007 the museum was expanded by renovating a 1935 cottage as a Kid's Cultural Clubhouse, and the construction of a 50-seat amphitheater named for C. Spencer Pompey, a pioneer black educator. Among the city's most niche museums is the pinball-centered Silverball Museum, which features more than 150 classic, playable pinball machines and arcade games.

The remains of the British Steamship Inchulva that sank on Sept 11, 1903 are located in shallow water near the public beach, acting as habitat for native fish and corals. Known today as the Delray Wreck, the site is noted for snorkeling and scuba diving.

Some historic houses have been repurposed. The historic Sundy House now operates as a luxury eco resort. The premises includes The Sundy family's former apartments and cottages which have been converted into guest accommodations, a café, an antique shop, and tropical Taru Gardens. The J.B. Evans House at 142 South Ocean Boulevard, has been repurposed into the Sandoway Discovery Center, a natural history museum and environmental center which features native plants, live animals, and a large collection of shells from around the world.

Delray Beach is also the home of the Morikami Museum and Japanese Gardens, a center for Japanese arts and culture. The campus includes two museum buildings, the Roji-en Japanese Gardens: Garden of the Drops of Dew, a bonsai garden, library, gift shop, and a Japanese restaurant, called the Cornell Cafe, which has been featured on the Food Network. Rotating exhibits are displayed in both buildings, and demonstrations, including tea ceremonies and classes, are held in the main building. Traditional Japanese festivals are celebrated several times a year.

Wakodahatchee Wetlands is a wetlands park open to the public. Facilities include a three-quarter mile (1.2 kilometer) boardwalk that crosses between open water pond areas, emergent marsh areas, shallow shelves, and islands with shrubs and snags to foster nesting and roosting. The site is part of the South section of the Great Florida Birding Trail and offers many opportunities to observe birds in their natural habitats. Over 151 species of birds have been spotted inside the park, including pied-billed grebe, snowy egrets, and black-bellied whistling ducks. The park is home to turtles, alligators, rabbits, frogs, and raccoons.

== Sports ==
The Delray Beach Open is an ATP Tour 250 series men's professional tennis tournament held each year. The Delray Beach Tennis Center has hosted the Fed Cup, the Davis Cup, and the Chris Evert Pro-Celebrity Tennis Classic.

The ProWorld Tennis Academy is located in Delray Beach. The Delray Beach Tennis Center is a full-service public tennis facility with 14 clay courts, 6 hard courts, and an 8,200-seat stadium located near downtown on Atlantic Avenue. The center includes an upstairs pavilion and conference room, pro-shop with locker rooms, racquet stringing, and merchandise. The club offers a variety of adult and junior programs, leagues, clinics and camps. A second location, the Delray Swim & Tennis Club, features 24 clay courts and a clubhouse that has a pro shop with merchandise and locker rooms.

On July 20, 2010, the city's commissioners proclaimed that the city's name would be officially changed to Tennis Beach for one week in honor of its nomination by the United States Tennis Association as one of the top tennis towns in the United States.

== Media ==
Delray Beach is covered by two major daily newspapers, the Palm Beach Post and Sun Sentinel, as well as local publications, including the Coastal Star, Delray Newspaper and the Delray Beach Times. There are also two lifestyle magazines, Delray Magazine and Atlantic Ave Magazine. Local television stations covering the county are channel 5 NBC WPTV, channel 25 ABC WPBF, channel 12 CBS WPEC and channel 29 FOX WFLX.

== Infrastructure ==
=== Transportation ===
Delray Beach has a street-legal golf cart community among residents as well as local businesses.

==== Highways ====
- Florida State Road A1A, locally known as "Ocean Boulevard", is a north–south Scenic and Historic Coastal Byway passing through the city between the Intracoastal Waterway and the Atlantic Ocean.
- U.S. Route 1, also known as "Federal Highway", is a north–south road passing through downtown, commercial districts, and residential areas in the eastern part of the city. US1 splits into a divided one-way pair through downtown.
- Interstate 95 bisects the city from north to south with two Delray Beach interchanges.
- Florida's Turnpike is a north–south toll road passing through unincorporated Delray Beach, with an interchange at Atlantic Avenue.
- U.S. Highway 441, also known as State Road 7, is a north–south highway passing through residential and commercial areas west of the city limits.
- Other major north–south roads include Congress Avenue, Military Trail, and Jog Road.
- Florida State Road 806, locally known as "Atlantic Avenue", is the primary east–west route between State Road A1A and US 441, and the central commercial thoroughfare downtown.
- Linton Boulevard and George Bush Boulevard are the other two roads connecting to State Road A1A with drawbridge crossings over the Intracoastal Waterway.

==== Rail ====
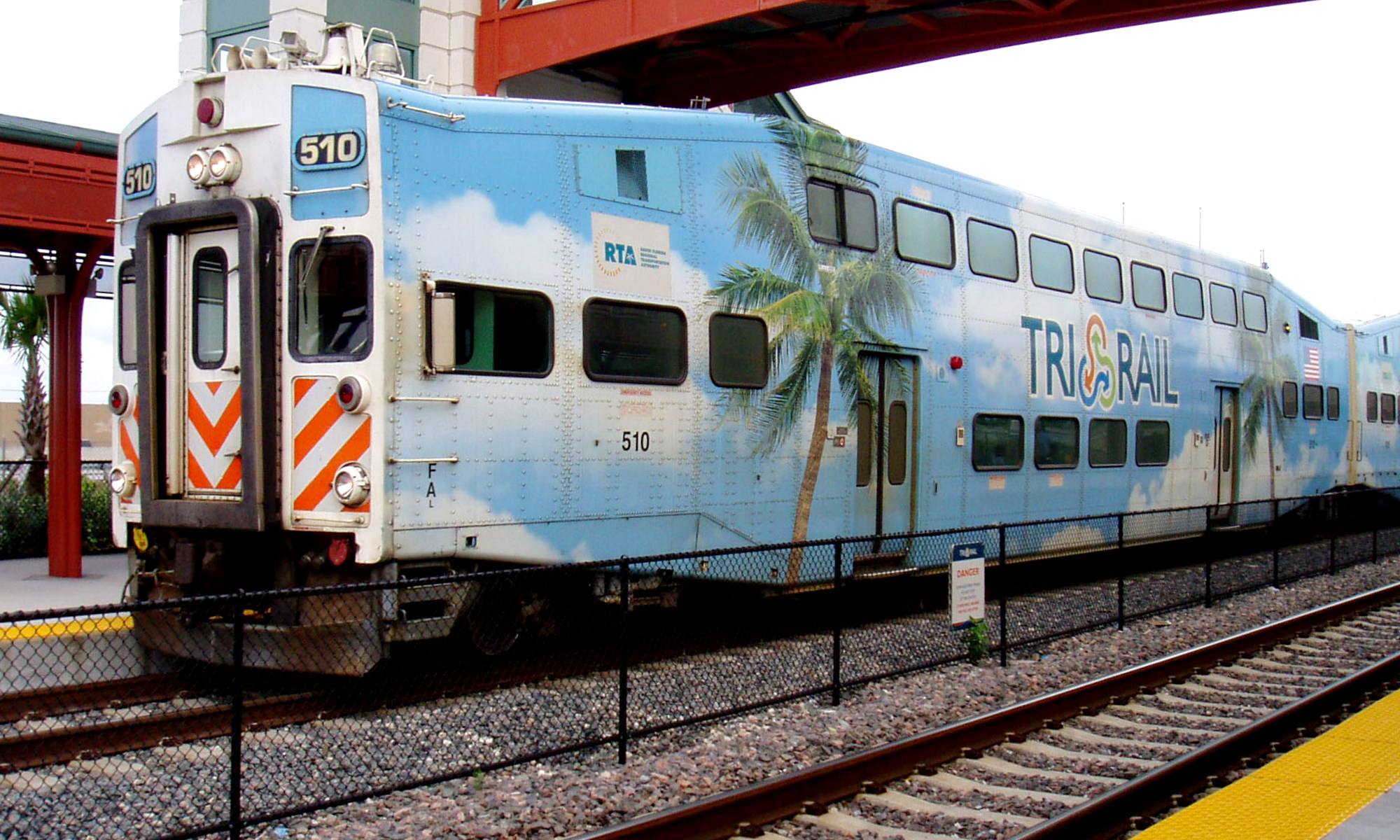
Tri-Rail commuter train at Delray beach Station.

- Tri-Rail commuter rail system and Amtrak serve the city with stops at Delray Beach Station.

==== Bus ====
- PalmTran provides local bus service in the area.

==== Water ====
Downtown Delray Beach is accessible by boat via The Intracoastal Waterway. The city has a municipal marina with rental slips south of the Atlantic Avenue crossing. Yacht cruises also launch daily from Veteran's Park north of the Atlantic Avenue drawbridge.

== Notable people ==
- Leslie Alexander, billionaire attorney, businessman and financier, owner of the Houston Rockets
- Kristin Kuhns Alexandre, novelist and screenwriter
- Kevin Anderson, South African-born professional tennis player
- Tommy Armour, Scottish-American professional golfer
- Alfons Bach, German-born industrial designer and painter
- Lisa Baker, Playboy model and actress
- Fred A. Bantz, business executive and Under Secretary of the Navy
- Filippo Barbieri, Brazilian-born professional cyclist
- Kim Barnouin, model and best-selling cookbook author
- Erwin S. Barrie, artist, gallery executive
- John Barrow, professional football player, Canadian Football Hall of Fame inductee
- Robert Bernstein, comic book writer, playwright, and concert impresario
- Eric Biddines, rapper, record producer
- Ashley Biden, social worker and fashion designer. Daughter of US President Joe Biden and First Lady Jill Biden.
- Michael Binger, professional poker player
- Jim Bishop, journalist and best-selling book author
- Prudy Taylor Board, author
- Jason Bonham, English-born drummer
- Benjamin A. Borenstein, food scientist
- Lemuel Boulware, business executive, head of labor relations for G.E.
- Marvin Bower, business management theorist and author
- Jerry Bresler, composer and musician
- Leslie Buck, New York-based businessman
- Bobby Butler, professional football player
- Jim Butler, professional football player, NFL Pro Bowl running back
- Yancy Butler, actress
- Milton Caniff, cartoonist
- Ken Carson, singer and entertainer
- Enrique Martinez Celaya, Cuban-American artist
- Joseph V. Charyk, space scientist, first Director of the National Reconnaissance Office
- James H. Clark, billionaire computer scientist and entrepreneur, founder of CommandScape
- Donald Henderson Clarke, novelist and screenwriter
- David Clowney, professional football player
- Clement Conger, U.S. State Department and White House curator
- Tom Creavy, professional golfer, PGA Championship winner
- Bobby Cruickshank, Scottish-American professional golfer
- Melinda Czink, Hungarian-born professional tennis player
- Lilly Daché, French-born milliner and fashion designer
- Beth Daniel, professional golfer
- Bucky Dent, professional baseball player and manager
- Jean Despres, French-born perfume industry businessman
- Rhea Durham, model
- Victoria Duval, professional tennis player
- S. Paul Ehrlich, Jr., former Surgeon General of the United States
- Arnold Eidus, violinist and recording artist
- Rita Ellis, politician
- William J. Ely, retired Lieutenant General in the U.S. Army.
- Mary Lena Faulk, professional golfer
- Ben Ferencz, prosecutor
- Mark Fields, president and CEO of Ford Motor Company
- Gar Finnvold, professional baseball player
- Richard Fleischman, viola player and conductor
- Brandon Flowers, professional football player
- Fontaine Fox, cartoonist and illustrator
- Orlando Franklin, Jamaican-born professional football player
- Coco Gauff, professional tennis player
- Jason Geathers, professional football player
- Sergio George, musician, Grammy Award winning record producer, founder of Top Stop Music
- William Henry Gleason, early real estate developer, lieutenant governor of Florida
- Izzy Goldstein, professional baseball player
- Hy Gotkin, professional basketball player
- Ted Gray, professional baseball player, MLB All-Star pitcher
- James J. Greco, businessman.
- Arnold Greenberg, New York-based businessman, co-founder of Snapple
- George Haggarty, professional basketball player, attorney
- Larry Haines, film and television actor, Broadway performer
- Roberta Haynes, actress
- Penny Hammel, professional golfer.
- C. Herrick Hammond, architect
- Billie Harvey, professional racing driver
- Barry Hill, professional football player
- Jayron Hosley, professional football player
- Gayle Hunnicutt, film and television actress
- Omar Jacobs, professional football player
- Kevin James, actor, comedian, writer, and producer
- Betty Jameson, professional golfer, World Golf Hall of Fame inductee
- Rhi Jeffrey, swimmer, US Olympic gold medalist
- Ricardo Jordan, professional baseball player
- Clarence Budington Kelland, writer
- Alex Kim, professional tennis player
- Chelsea Krost, television and radio personality
- Steve Leveen, businessman, author, co-founder of The Levenger Company
- William S. Linton, U.S. Congressman, investor and early settler
- Lou Little, football player and coach
- Nancy Littlefield, film and television producer and director
- Nicholas M. Loeb, film and television actor and producer, businessman, socialite
- Betty Luster, television actress, singer, dancer
- Gustav Maass, architect
- Rick Macci, USPTA tennis coach
- Rod MacDonald, singer-songwriter
- Lee MacPhail, business executive for Major League Baseball, American League president
- Tomas Maier, German-born fashion designer, creative director of Bottega Veneta
- Meg Mallon, professional golfer
- Bam Margera, television personality, skateboarder, and stunt performer.
- Fran Matera, cartoonist
- Bryan McCabe, Canadian-born professional ice hockey player
- Fred McCarthy, cartoonist
- Joseph J. McCarthy, lieutenant colonel in the U.S. Marine Corps, World War II Medal of Honor recipient
- Central McClellion, professional football player
- Jameel McCline, professional heavyweight boxer
- Bob McFadden, voice actor, singer, and impressionist
- Thomas Joseph Meskill, U.S. Congressman, governor of Connecticut, and United States Court of Appeals for the Second Circuit judge
- Edna St. Vincent Millay, writer and poet, Pulitzer Prize winner
- Mike Mineo, singer-songwriter and musician
- Greg Miskiw, former editor of British tabloid newspaper News of the World
- George Sukeji Morikami, Japanese-born pineapple farmer, member of the Yamato Colony
- Ralph Morse, photographer for Life magazine
- Zack Mosley, comic strip artist
- Louis Moyroud, French-born American inventor
- Bob Murphy, professional golfer, PGA Champions Tour
- Tommy O'Connell, professional football player, NFL Pro Bowl quarterback
- Robert Oelman, business executive and co-founder of Wright State University
- John T. Oxley, businessman, polo player and polo club owner
- Preston Parker, professional football player
- John Patrick, dramatist and Pulitzer Prize winning playwright
- Josue Paul, professional football player
- Toney Penna, Italian-American professional golfer
- Lillie Pierce Voss, writer and pioneer
- Chad Plummer, professional football player
- Lois Pope, philanthropist and socialite
- Theodore Pratt, novelist
- Anthony Pugliese, real estate developer and pop culture collector
- Nina Wilcox Putnam, novelist, screenwriter and playwright
- J Rand, singer, actor, dancer, songwriter
- Jim Raymond, artist, cartoonist
- Rick Rhoden, professional baseball player and golfer
- Steve Rifkind, hip-hop music mogul
- Godfrey A. Rockefeller, aviator and environmental conservationist, co-founder of World Wide Fund
- Samari Rolle, professional football player, NFL Pro Bowl cornerback
- Mike Rumph, professional football player
- Kenneth Rush, U.S. diplomat
- Kerri Sanborn, bridge player
- Gene Sarazen, professional golfer, World Golf Hall of Fame inductee.
- Harry Sargeant III, billionaire energy and shipping magnate
- Ossie Schectman, professional basketball player
- Paul J. H. Schoemaker, Dutch-American author and academic
- Jackson Scholz, U.S. Olympic sprinter, portrayed in Chariots of Fire
- Albert Seedman, New York Police Department chief of detectives
- Mike Sherman, television host
- Robert Sickinger, theatre director
- Isiah C. Smith, African-American civil-rights leader, attorney, and judge
- Solomon D. Spady, educator
- Leon Stein, writer and newspaper editor
- Louise Suggs, professional golfer, co-founder of the LPGA Tour
- Macrae Sykes, former chairman of the American Stock Exchange
- Meir Teper, American-Israeli film producer and businessman
- Gene Tierney, actress
- Sofía Vergara, Colombian-American actress and model
- Mark Wahlberg, actor, producer, and former rapper
- Al Wallace, professional football player
- Mashona Washington, professional tennis player
- Anna Leigh Waters, no. 1 professional pickleball player
- H.T. Webster, cartoonist
- Max Weinberg, drummer and television personality
- Russ Weiner, multi-billionaire businessman, founder of Rockstar energy drink
- Serena Williams, professional tennis player
- Venus Williams, professional tennis player
- Gary Woodland, professional golfer
- Van Winitsky, professional tennis player
- Denys Wortman, painter and cartoonist

== In popular culture ==
During the Artists and Writers Colony of the 1930s–1950s, Delray Beach residents and locations were described and depicted—both directly and indirectly—within the cartoon illustrations of Herb Roth, W.J. (Pat) Enright, H.T. Webster, Fontaine Fox, and Jim Raymond.

Delray Beach is referenced in published correspondence from poet Edna St. Vincent Millay, who resided in the city with her husband Eugen Jan Boissevain in 1935–1936 while writing Conversation at Midnight.

Popular novels with scenes specifically set in Delray Beach include La Brava, Elmore Leonard's 1984 Edgar Award winner for Best Novel, and Elaine Viets' Catnapped! from the national bestselling Dead-End Job mystery series.

Transplanted Greenwich Village folk singer Rod MacDonald's song "My Neighbors in Delray" was written upon the author's discovery that some of the terrorists responsible for the September 11 attacks had spent time in Delray Beach before the attacks. Some film and television productions specifically set or filmed in Delray Beach include:

- Body Heat, starring William Hurt, Kathleen Turner, and Ted Danson, was partially filmed in Delray Beach.
- The Comedian, a 2016 film starring Robert De Niro, Leslie Mann and Danny DeVito, was partially filmed in Delray Beach.
- Bad Boys II, starring Martin Lawrence and Will Smith, was partially filmed in Delray Beach. The film's producers blew up a real $40 million waterfront mansion in Delray Beach as part of a scene that is set in Cuba.
- After Midnight, a 2014 feature film was shot in Artists Alley, part of Delray Beach's Pineapple Grove Arts District downtown.
- In Her Shoes, starring Cameron Diaz, Toni Collette, and Shirley MacLaine, is partially set and was filmed in Delray Beach.
- Hitters Anonymous, starring Linda Blair, Steven Bauer, and Clint Howard, was filmed in Delray Beach.
- Traces of Red, starring James Belushi, Lorraine Bracco and Tony Goldwyn, was partially filmed in Delray Beach.
- CSI: Miami filmed scenes, including a crash-landing of a light aircraft on the beach, in Delray Beach.
- TLC's program The Psychic MatchMaker is shot in Delray Beach.
- Broad City, a Comedy Central series, shot a season 4 episode titled "Florida" at multiple locations in Delray Beach.

== Sister cities ==
Delray Beach has four sister cities, as designated by Sister Cities International:

- Miyazu, Kyoto, Japan - Miyazu was the birthplace of George Morikami, for whom Morikami Park and the Morikami Museum and Japanese Gardens is named.
- Moshi, Tanzania
- Aquin, Haiti
- Pesaro, Italy

== See also ==
- LaFrance Hotel
- National Online Insurance School
