= On the Mike with Mike Sherman =

On The Mike with Mike Sherman is a weekly syndicated U.S. TV show. It airs on the R&R Network on DirecTV in the US, and in the UK on the Flava channel on Sky Satellite TV.

Created and presented by host Mike Sherman, and Directed and Edited by Matt Bodi Brenowitz, the show focuses on the urban and pop music industry and comprises interviews with R&B, hip-hop, Latin, pop and reggaetón artists (as well as actors and celebrities of all kinds) It covers major music events such as the Billboard Music Awards, American Society of Composers, Authors and Publishers Awards, Broadcast Music Incorporated Awards, BET Awards and others. The show, which is produced by Mike Sherman Productions Inc., based in Delray Beach, south Florida, has been broadcasting since 2003 - first on WBFS in Miami and several other national cable networks. Due to its popularity and consistent ratings, it was retained by Baruch Television Group and Baruch Entertainment, known for syndicating over 500 TV shows such as 'Be In Tune' and 'The Weekend Vibe', and motion picture packages.

The show has helped launch acts such as Pretty Ricky (nominated for "Best Group" at the BET Awards 2007) and Grammy Award-winning rap artist Chamillionaire, who both made their first TV appearance on the show, as did Miami pop superstars Flo Rida and Sean Kingston.

== Notable celebrities interviewed ==
Celebrities, whose interviews with Mike have appeared on the show, include: T-Pain, Mary J. Blige, Akon, Russell Simmons, the Pussycat Dolls, Ludacris, Scott Storch, Snoop Dogg and Christian Audigier.

== The format ==
The show's format includes "red carpet events" in music, and behind-the-scenes coverage of music videos in the making. It interviews music artists from the world.

The show also includes a segment called the "Indie Spotlight", with aspiring independent artists and music labels. The aspiring artists can upload a video clip to the show's website, where it is displayed and voted on by the viewing audience. Each week, the winner advances to the following week's show. The ultimate winner will be given a major record deal. This interactivity has enhanced the show's ratings, making it one of the highest rated shows in its time slot in south Florida.

== See also ==
- Before the Fame, Sherman's subsequent show
