= National Online Insurance School =

American online pre-licensing school

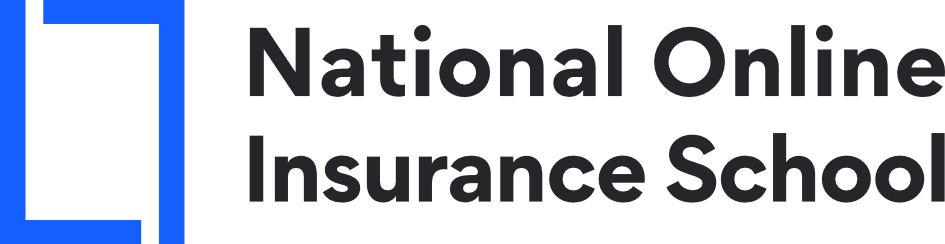
- Industry: Insurance Education
- Founded: Delray Beach, FL, US (2008)
- Headquarters: Delray Beach, FL, US
- Products: Online pre-license training for: Life & Annuity; Health; Life, Health & Variable Annuity
- Website: nationalonlineinsuranceschool.com

National Online Insurance School is a nationwide state-certified pre-licensing insurance school headquartered in Delray Beach, Florida, United States. Established in 2008, it provides pre-licensing insurance education for health, life and variable annuity insurance license designations.

== Services ==
As a state-accredited insurance education provider, courses provided by National Online Insurance School satisfy state credit hour requirements and prepare individuals to take their respective state's insurance exam. In contrast to the typical scheduling conflicts associated with classroom learning, online courses allow students to study when it's convenient for them and at a pace in which they can individually comprehend and retain the course material. Licensed instructors are available 7 days a week throughout their entire enrollment period to answer questions and help guide them through the licensing process as well.

== Content ==
Online insurance courses offered through National Online Insurance School cover all of the topics listed on each state's examination content outline and include such insurance topics as life insurance, health insurance, annuities, Social Security, retirement plans, accident death and dismemberment insurance (AD&D), disability insurance, insurance underwriting, as well as each state's insurance laws and licensing regulations.
