= J. B. Evans House =

Historic house in Florida, United States

- U.S. National Register of Historic Places
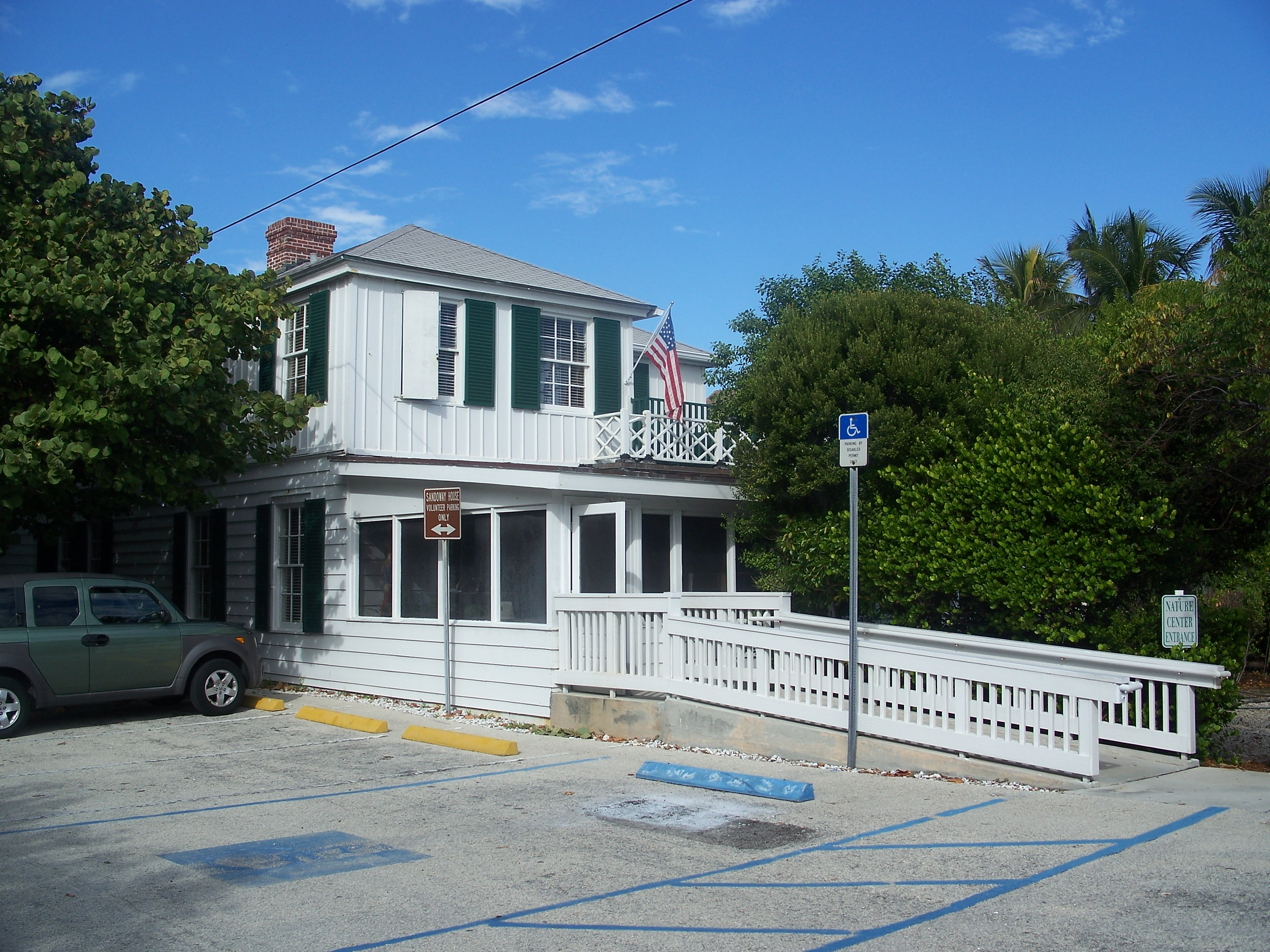

- Location within Florida
- Location: Delray Beach, Florida
- Coordinates: 26°27′29″N 80°3′35″W
- Built: 1936
- Architectural style: Colonial Revival
- NRHP reference No.: 02000265
- Added to NRHP: March 28, 2002

The J. B. Evans House (now known as the Sandoway Discovery Center and formerly known as the Sandoway House Nature Center) is a historic house located at 142 South Ocean Boulevard in Delray Beach, Florida, United States. It retains its essential historic architectural integrity and is a landmark in Delray Beach. Named after retired produce broker J. B. Evans, the two-story, wood-frame structure was constructed in 1936. Architecturally, the dwelling is of the Resort Colonial-style and contains an irregular floor plan, with former William Manly King associate Samuel Ogren, Sr. being its likely designer.

On March 28, 2002, the J. B. Evans House was listed on the National Register of Historic Places. The dwelling underwent significant renovation and restoration work in the 1990s, and it re-opened in 1998 as the Sandoway House Nature Center, a coastal ecosystems and marine life center. At some point, the center was renamed the Sandoway Discovery Center.

== Description and history ==
The J. B. Evans House is named after a produce broker who moved to Delray Beach from Murfreesboro, Tennessee, with his wife, Lucille. Delray Beach had an agricultural-based economy in its early history, with thousands of boxes of crops delivered via the Florida East Coast Railway on a daily basis for six months of the year during the 1930s. That decade, J. B. Evans retired. Alieda N. Riley and Robert O. Jones of the Florida Bureau of Historic Preservation stated that the architect is unknown but argued that it was Samuel Ogren, Sr. due to similarities compared to his other works. Ogren previously built homes in Delray Beach while working for architect William Manly King of West Palm Beach. Additionally, The Palm Beach Post listed Ogren as the architect. In 1937, Evans was appointed a personal aide to Governor Fred P. Cone.

The house, located at 142 South Ocean Boulevard has a two-story, wood-frame structure and was originally constructed as a single-family residence. Built in 1936, during the Depression as a seasonal residence, the construction represents what locally is known as Resort Colonial Style. It has an irregular floor plan and was built on a concrete slab foundation. The first story has horizontal clapboard, and the second story is board and batten. The house has a composition-shingled complex hip roof that is low-pitched and has a brick chimney in the center. The windows are filled with 6/6 double-hung wooden sashes, which are protected by operable louvered shutters. Seven rooms are located on the first floor, and the second floor is composed of five rooms, while an elevator connects both levels.

Some alterations were made over the years, including the addition of a pool in 1966 and a partial wrap-around porch in 1980. A full restoration of the dwelling occurred between 1996 and 1997. The J. B. Evans House was added to the U.S. National Register of Historic Places on March 28, 2002.

== Sandoway House Nature Center and Sandoway Discovery Center ==
Around 1995, residents of Delray Beach began lobbying for county and state grants to acquire the J. B. Evans House, which cost $620,000 at the time. During the next few years, the Friends of Sandoway organization worked with contractors, educators, and marine biologists to transform the residence into a nature center. The Sandoway House Nature Center opened in May 1998. At some point, the facility was renamed the Sandoway Discovery Center, a coastal ecosystems and marine life center. It features native plants, live native and invasive reptile species, a coral reef pool with sharks and fish, and a large collection of shells from around the world. The center offers environmental education programs and classes.

== See also ==
- National Register of Historic Places listings in Palm Beach County, Florida
