= Marina Historic District =

Historic district in Florida, United States

- U.S. National Register of Historic Places
- U.S. Historic district
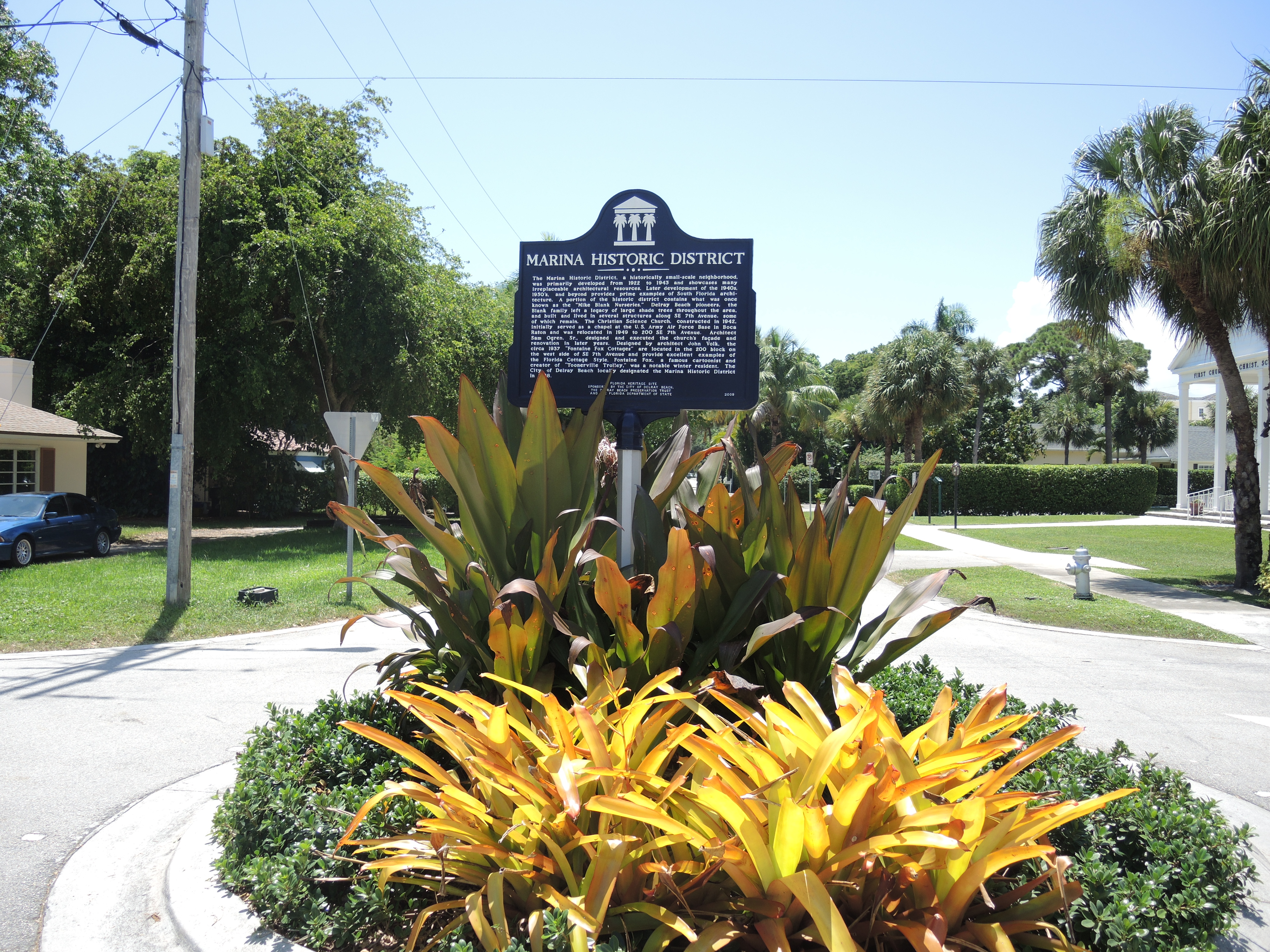
- Marina Historic District

- Location within Florida Location within the United States
- Location: Delray Beach, Florida
- Coordinates: 26°27′30″N 80°03′56″W
- NRHP reference No.: 14000268
- Added to NRHP: June 2, 2014

Marina Historic District is a national historic district in Delray Beach, Florida in Palm Beach County. Situated on the Intracoastal Waterway and including the town's City Marina, it is bounded by E. Atlantic Ave., Marine Way, SE 4th Str, SE 7th Ave.

It was added to the National Register of Historic Places in 2014.
