= Before the Fame =

American TV show

Before the Fame is a celebrity-based weekly television show from Miami, Florida that showcases well-known celebrities before they were famous. It is broadcast on My33 WBFS-TV CBS Miami at 1am on Saturday night and hosted by Mike Sherman. Celebrities that have appeared on the show so far include Flo Rida, Rick Ross, Pitbull, DJ Khaled, T Pain, Mike Tyson and Fat Joe, many of whom appeared on Mike's previous show On the Mike with Mike Sherman.
