= LaFrance Hotel =

Coordinates: 26.464749°N 80.077597°W

LaFrance Hotel is a historic African American hotel that was opened in 1949 in Delray Beach, Florida.

== Overview ==
The LaFrance Hotel is an historic African American hotel that was founded and owned by an African American man named Charlie Patrick, and later by his family.

The LaFrance is located in Delray Beach, Florida in the historic West Settlers neighborhood which is an African-American neighborhood. It was the first black owned hotel located between Delray Beach and Fort Lauderdale in 1949.

During the era of legal segregation in America, the LaFrance provided much needed accommodations for African American travelers. Many of those hotel patrons were African Americans who worked seasonally in the Delray Beach area as maids, butlers, chauffeurs and waiters for the well-to-do seasonal white residents.

The LaFrance was named after the wife of Charlie Patrick whose name was Francenia Patrick. Charlie Patrick became very wealthy investing in real estate and he and his wife were among the black high society of the Delray Beach area.

The LaFrance hotel no longer operates as a hotel but is now a remodeled apartment complex for senior citizens.
