= John and Elizabeth Shaw Sundy House =

Historic house in Florida, United States

- U.S. National Register of Historic Places
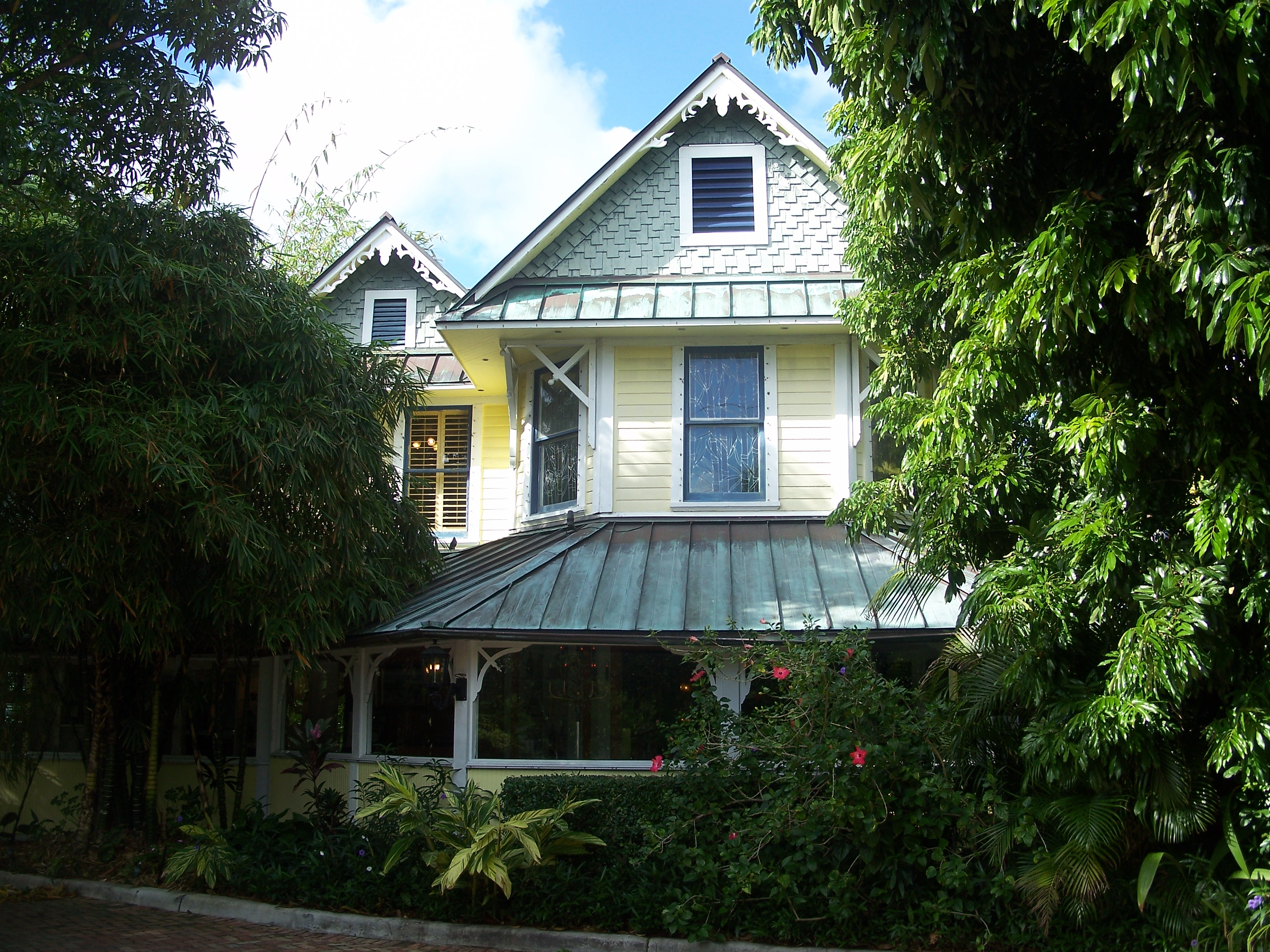
- A restaurant now occupies the historic Sundy House.

- Location within Florida Location within the United States
- Location: Delray Beach, Florida, United States
- Coordinates: 26°27′33″N 80°4′25″W
- Built: 1902
- Architectural style: Frame Vernacular with Queen Anne elements
- NRHP reference No.: 91001910
- Added to NRHP: January 16, 1992

The John and Elizabeth Shaw Sundy House is a historic home in Delray Beach, Florida, United States. It is located at 106 South Swinton Avenue. Built in 1902, this two-story, Frame Vernacular and Queen Anne-style structure is one of the oldest homes in Delray Beach. John and Elizabeth Shaw Sundy, a prominent couple in the town's early history, are the namesakes of the dwelling, with John working on the Florida East Coast Railway and serving in political offices such as being Delray Beach's first mayor and a municipal judge. Elizabeth Shaw Sundy established Delray Beach's first school and library and worked in education.

On January 16, 1992, the John and Elizabeth Shaw Sundy House was added to the U.S. National Register of Historic Places. It is the only known remaining home of Queen Anne-style architecture in Delray Beach, as most of the others were destroyed by the 1928 Okeechobee hurricane. Currently, the dwelling is used as a hotel and restaurant.

== History and description ==
The John and Elizabeth Shaw Sundy House is named after a prominent married couple in Delray Beach's early history who moved there in 1899. Elizabeth assisted with the establishment of the town's first library and schools in 1911, chartered a church in 1912, and worked as a teacher and school board chairperson.John Sundy previously worked on Henry Flagler's Florida East Coast Railway (FEC) and later served eight one-year terms as Delray Beach's first mayor between 1911 and 1925, before becoming a municipal judge in 1926. He also founded Sundy Feed & Fertilizer Company in 1913.

In 1902, John Sundy hired locally well-known contractor Henry T. Grant to construct him a house at 106 South Swinton Avenue, although the architect remains unknown. This location was advantageous due to its proximity to Delray Beach's (FEC) station, allowing him to commute to West Palm Beach and transport Georgia pine, which was used for building his residence rather than Dade County pine.

Grant finished erecting the dwelling later in 1902, which received praise from the Tropic Sun newspaper for being "one of the finest between West Palm Beach and Miami." A two-story, seven-room residence with a brick pier foundation, it is one of the oldest homes in Delray Beach and the only known one in the town to feature elements of Queen Anne-style architecture. This is because many other dwellings with that architectural design were destroyed by the 1928 Okeechobee hurricane. John and Elizabeth Sundy continued to live in the home until their deaths in 1947 and 1952, respectively, although their relatives occupied the residence until 1990.

Few alterations had been made to the home by 1991, mainly consisting of the addition of three bathrooms and modifications to protect it from the elements. On January 16, 1992, the John and Elizabeth Shaw Sundy House was listed on the National Register of Historic Places. The home and its grounds, along with several other properties, sold in 2014 for $17.15 million. Currently, the dwelling is used as a hotel and restaurant, which have been praised by Travel + Leisure magazine as one of the "30 Great Inn's in the U.S." and the Sun Sentinel for being one of the best restaurants in Florida.

== See also ==
- National Register of Historic Places listings in Palm Beach County, Florida
