= Mike Sherman (TV presenter) =

Mike Sherman is the presenter of "On the Mike with Mike Sherman" that aired from 2006 to 2011. Prior to that, he presented The Mike Sherman Show. Today, he is the presenter of Before the Fame, a celebrity-based weekly television show from Miami, Florida that showcases well-known celebrities before they were famous.

Mike received a Film, Recording and Entertainment Council (FREC) award in 2010 for Best TV Host in South Florida.

Mike is also a producer of the 2023 Nicky Hopkins documentary, The Session Man.
