= Levenger =

- Founded: 1987
- Founders: Steve and Lori Leveen
- Headquarters: Delray Beach, Florida
- Key people: Margaret Moraskie, CEO
- Website: www.levenger.com

Levenger is an American privately held retail company based in Delray Beach, Florida. Founded in 1987, it sells products such as portfolios, stationery, planners, and leather briefcases.

== History ==
Levenger was founded in 1987 by Steve and Lori Leveen. The name “Levenger” was derived from their surnames, Leveen (Leve-) and Granger (-nger). They began selling lamps with an ad placed in The New Yorker magazine, using their neighbor's garage as the fulfillment center and their spare bedroom as the company's main office. They used retirement funds for the startup of the company, and in two months after running the ad, Levenger had 47 customers. 1999, the company had grown to be a US$60M business.

== Products ==
Levenger sells products that include portfolios, stationery, planners, and leather briefcases.
