= Old School Square =

- Delray Beach Schools
- U.S. National Register of Historic Places
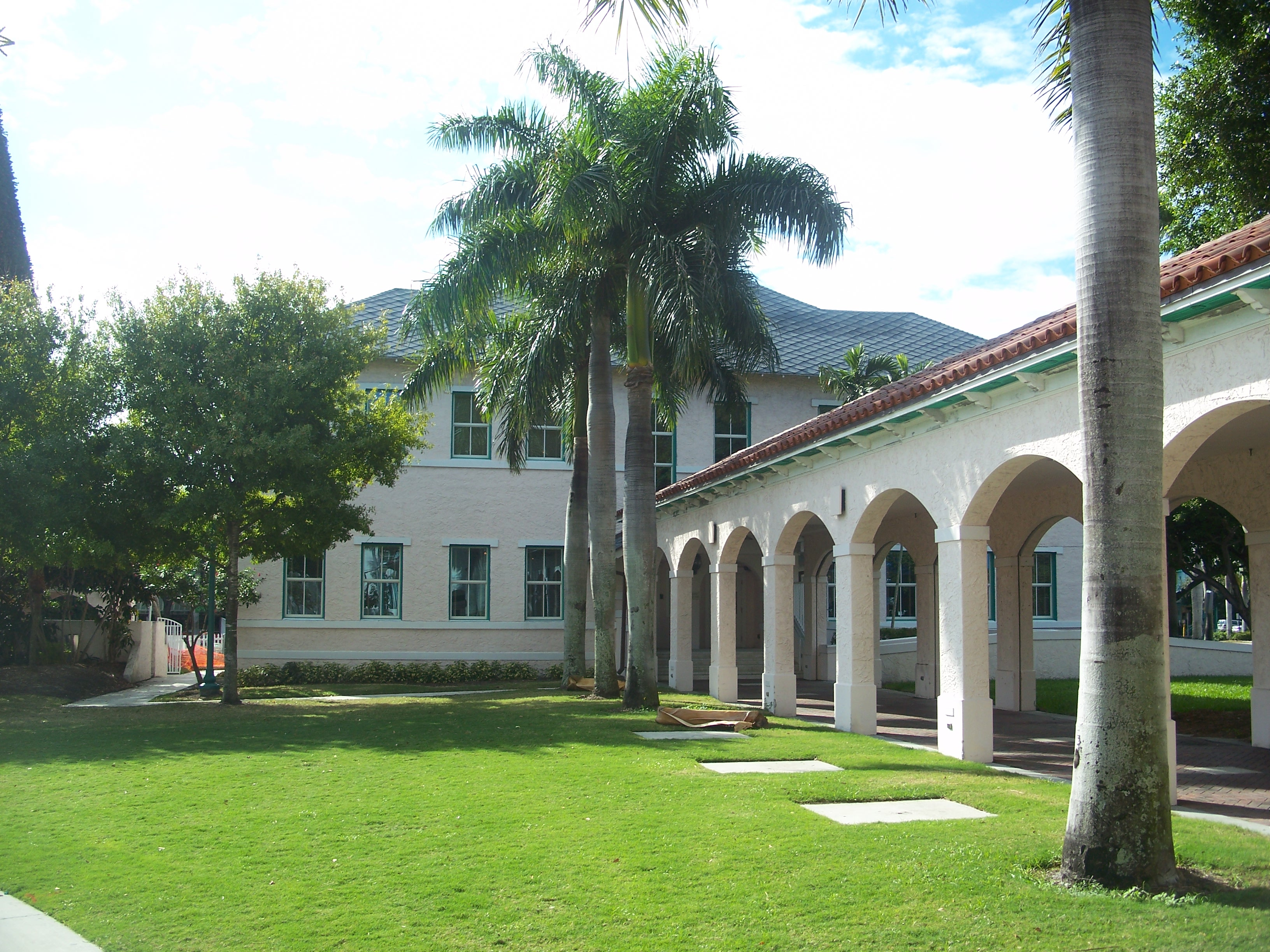

- Location within Florida Location within the United States
- Location: Palm Beach County, Florida, USA
- Nearest city: Delray Beach, Florida
- Coordinates: 26°27′45″N 80°4′21″W
- Built: 1913
- NRHP reference No.: 88000210
- Added to NRHP: March 10, 1988

Old School Square is located in a historic area at 51 North Swinton Avenue in Delray Beach, Florida, United States. The 5-acre (2.0 ha) site is at the corner of Atlantic Avenue and Swinton Avenue, anchoring Delray's downtown shopping district. The campus includes restored early 20th century school buildings, formerly Delray Elementary and Delray High School, which were re-adapted as the Cornell Art Museum, Crest Theatre and Fieldhouse. The campus also includes the Pavilion in the center grounds, which is an outdoor entertainment stage with grass seating area, as well as the Old School Square Park just to the east. A City of Delray Beach parking garage is located adjacent to the park.

== History ==
=== Beginnings ===
The first construction on the site was the erection of Delray Elementary School in 1913, at the corner of Atlantic and Swinton Avenues. The school served white students in grades 1–12. As the city's population grew, it became necessary for the school to grow, and Delray High School was constructed on the same site, north of the Delray Elementary, in 1925. Eventually, the city's population grew to the point at which these two schools were no longer sufficient and plans were drawn to build a new high school north of town, which became first Seacrest High School, and then Atlantic High School after the racial integration in schools resulting from the civil rights movement. Delray High's last graduating class was the class of 1949. When the new school opened, Delray Elementary expanded to fill both buildings on the old campus.

=== Abandonment ===
As time passed, the buildings of Delray Elementary increasingly fell into disrepair, and the Palm Beach County School Board abandoned the campus in the mid-1980s. A new elementary school opened in the western part of the city in 1988, S.D. Spady Elementary School. A group of concerned citizens, led by members of the Delray Beach Historical Society, started an initiative to preserve and restore the buildings of the former Delray Elementary and Delray High schools. They recognized the cultural value of preserving buildings that had been an integral part of the city's history. More importantly, they saw that the buildings possessed the potential to be transformed into a new cultural arts center for the area. Furthermore, the renovation of the site was seen as a spearhead for the reinvigoration of the whole downtown area- which at the time had barely a 30 percent occupancy rate.

=== Rebirth ===
In 1986, the 4-acre (16,000 m^{2}) site was incorporated as Old School Square, Inc. Plans for renovation of the buildings commenced. In 1988, Delray Elementary was closed and the property was acquired by the city of Delray Beach. On March 10 of that year "Delray Beach Schools" was listed on the National Register of Historic Places. By 1990, the first phase of the project was complete, as the Cornell Museum of Art & American Culture opened in the original Delray Elementary School building. Furthermore, the exterior renovation of the high school building was completed. Three years later, in 1993, the Crest Theatre opened for its first season in the former high school auditorium, which had been converted and modernized into a modern professional venue for the performing arts. In 1998, renovation of the Crest Theatre was completed as the work on the classrooms was finished, and they were opened to the public.

As the first phase of a new 10 year master plan for expansion, an outdoor entertainment pavilion opened in 2002, complete with a concession building. Covered loggias enclose the grassy seating area.

== Cornell Art Museum at Old School Square ==
The Cornell Art Museum at Old School Square is located in the 1913 Delray Elementary School building and features 7 exhibition galleries and a Museum Store. Exhibits rotate every 4 months and focus on contemporary art by nationally and internationally recognized artists from around the U.S. The Museum also presents monthly "Art Walk" exhibits dedicated to showcasing South Florida artists.

== Crest Theatre at Old School Square ==
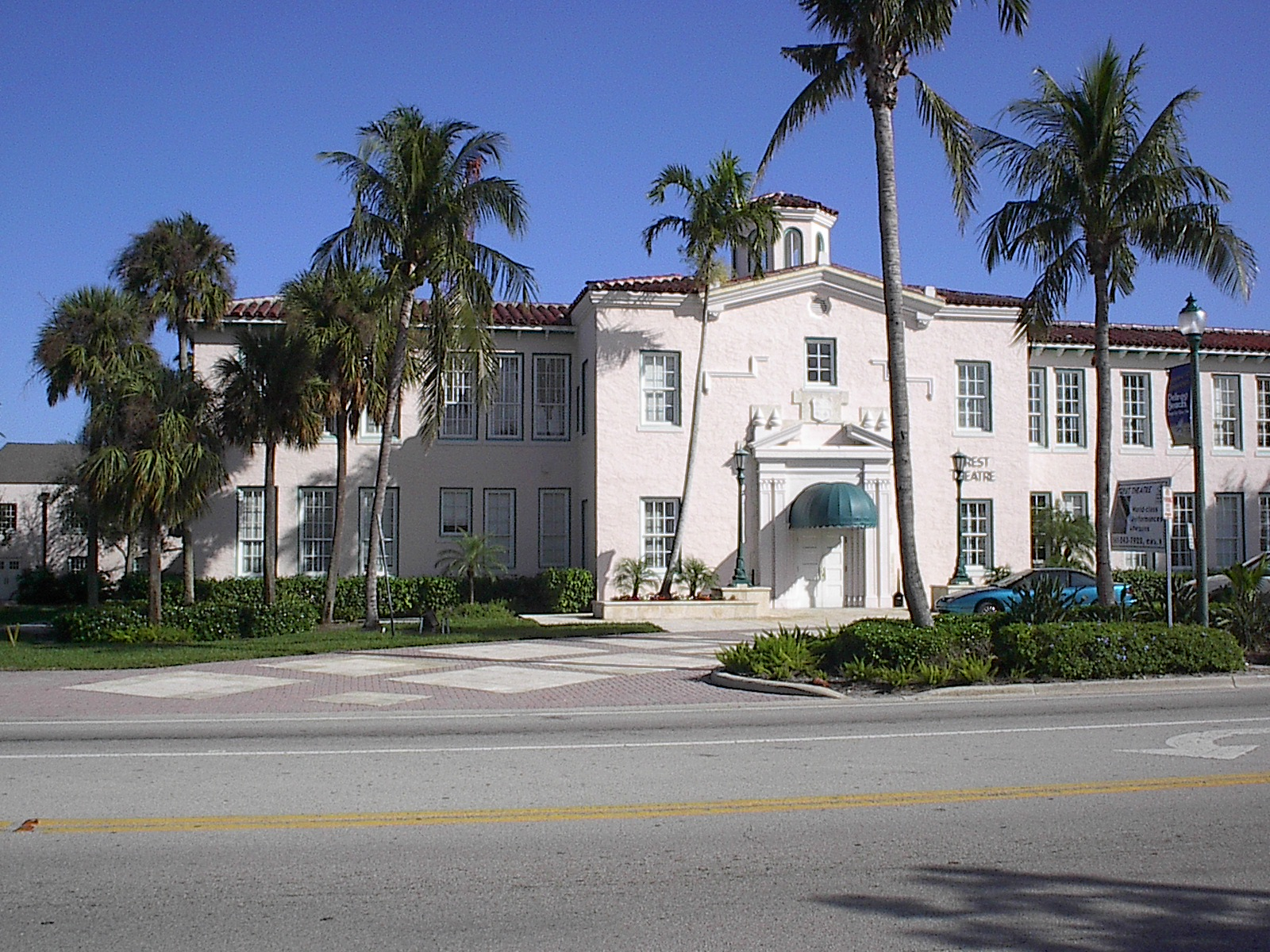
The old high school building now houses the Crest Theatre.

The Crest Theatre at Old School Square is located in the 1925 Delray High School building and presents professional performances including musical theatre, comedy, family shows and Broadway cabaret. The Crest lecture series features national speakers and a variety of topics.

== The Pavilion at Old School Square ==
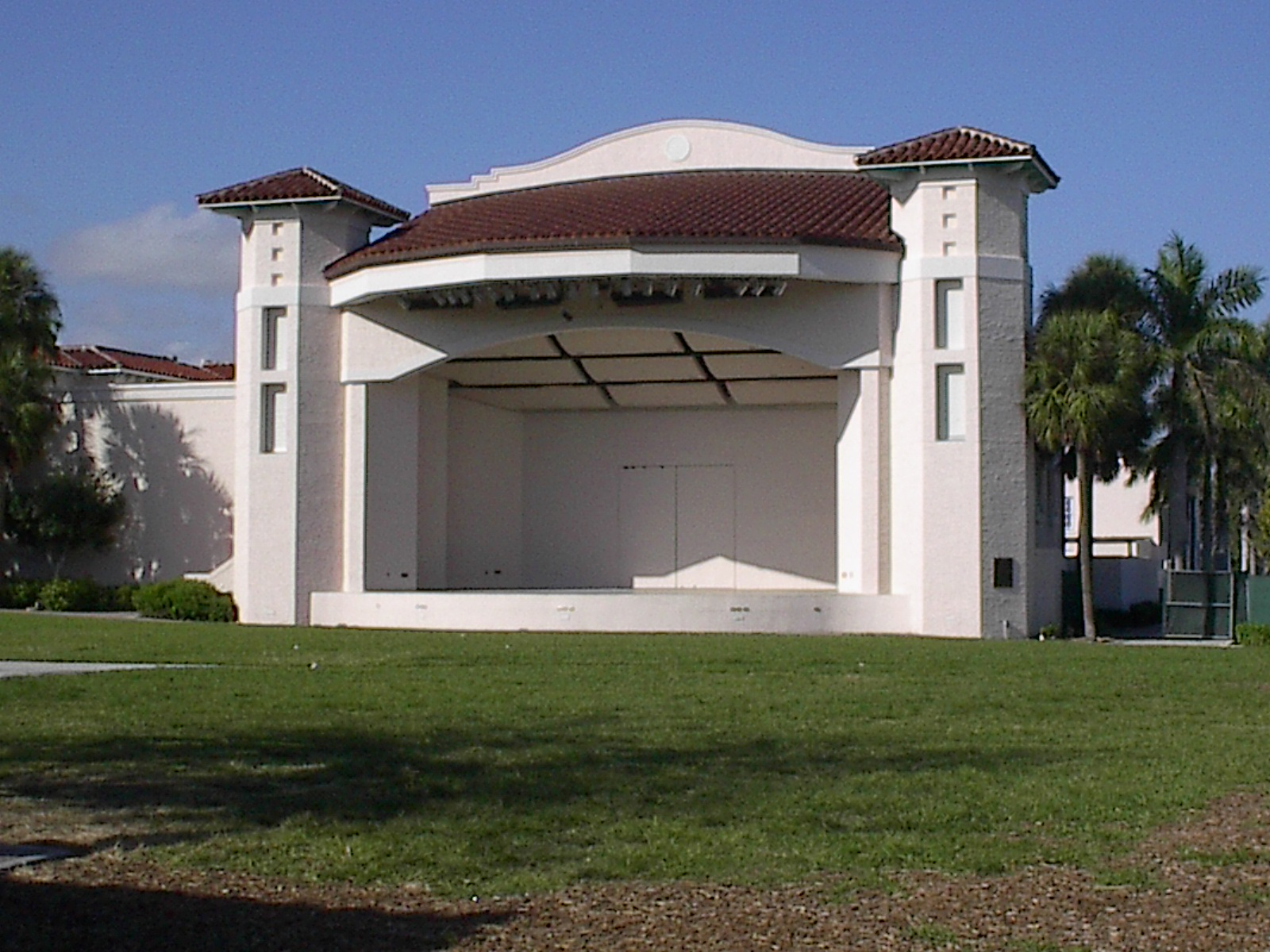
The entertainment pavilion is a recent addition to Old School Square.

The Pavilion at Old School Square which opened in 2002, presents outdoor concerts and special events and hosts all of Delray's major festivals.
