= Filippo Barbieri (cyclist) =

Brazilian cyclist

Filippo Barbiero is a professional cross-country mountain bike racer. He is from São Paulo, Brazil but currently lives in Delray Beach, Florida. He raced from 1996 to 2002. In 2002 he took 8 years off the sport and resumed his racing career in the fall of 2010.

== Racing history ==
Filippo was born on June 10, 1983. He started mountain bike racing in 1997 and quickly fell in love with the sport. As junior racer from 1999 to 2001, he posted several great results. He got 3rd place in the 1999 SRAM Sea Otter Classic, which had 150 racers, and he was the 1999 Sand Blaster Champion with 3 out of 5 victories. In 2001 he was the Junior Expert State Champion with 5 out of 8 victories. In 2002, he moved up to pro class and his focus was to make it into the 2004 Brazilian Olympic Team. In 2002 he won the Florida sunshine State games. That same year he also got 2nd Overall in the "Ford No Boundaries Mountain Bike Series" and 15th Place at the Norba Nationals in West Virginia. Halfway through his 2002 season, his family went through a difficult time and he was forced to retire from racing to help them out as much as possible. 8 years later, he was lucky enough to have friends who knew he still had untapped potential in cycling. In August 2010 he began training again and did his first race back in Cat. 2 and won it. After that he got focused on getting back to racing full-time. In 2010-2011 he got 2nd overall in the State Series with 2 wins out of 8 races. He also got 1st overall in the 2011 Coconut Cup with 4 out of 6 victories in Cat. 2. In 2011 he moved back up the Pro Class again and won 3 Pro Races in the La Rooota Series. In 2012 he has set his goal of racing in the 2012 Pan American Games.

== Results 2013 ==
2nd Place: Florida Off-Road Cycling Enthusiasts (FORCE) mountain bike time trail, Delray Beach, Florida

1st place: Dyer Challenge, West Palm Beach, Florida

50th place: Pan American Championships, Tucumán Province Argentina

1st place: Down To Eart la roota, Miami, Florida

== Results 2012 ==
1st Place: Feb 18th LA ROOOOTA SERIES #1 Oleta River State Park, Miami, FL USA

12th Place: Feb 25th Copa Fecha #1 Paraiso, Costa Rica UCI Cat 1 Race

15th Place: March 11, Taca Brasil, Curitiba Brasil UCI Cat 1 Race

27th Place: March 24 Copa Internacional de MTB, Araxa Minas Gerais Brasil UCI Cat 1 Race

32nd Place: April 9 Pan American Championship, Puebla Mexico

2nd Place: April 15 LA ROOOOTA SERIES #2 Oleta River State Park, Miami, FL USA

67th Place: June 24 UCI World Cup - Mont Sainte Anne

71st Place June 30 UCI World Cup- Windham NY

4th Place: September 9. Florida State Championship Tallahassee, FL

1st Place: October 13, Virginia Key Short Track, Miami, FL

2nd Place: December 15, 12 Hours of Markham, Sunrise Florida

- Qualified For the 2012 UCI Mountain XC World Championship

== Results 2010-2011 ==
=== 2011 results ===
Place Date Race

- 1st Place: January 23 Coconut #4 Amelia Earhart Park
- 1st Place: January 23 Coconut #5 Markham Park
- 1st Place: February 13 Coconut #6 Oleta River State Park
- Finished 1st overall for the Coconut Cup
- 1st Place: May 7 LA ROOOOTA SERIES #3 Oleta River State Park
- 1st Place: June 11 LA ROOOOTA SERIES #4 Amelia Earhart Park
- 10th Place: July 14–17, 2011 2011 National Champ Sun valley Idaho
- 4th Place: August 7 Rumble In The Jungle Markham Park
- 1st Place: Dec 17th LA ROOOOTA SERIES #8 Oleta River State Park

=== 2010 results ===
Place Date Race Location

- 4th Place: September 26 FSC #2 - Florida State Championship Series Fernandina Beach, FL
- 2nd Place: October 2 & 3 FSC #3 - Florida State Championship Series Gaines ville, FL (Halie's Trails)
- 1st Place: October 24 FSC #4 - Florida State Championship Series Lithia, FL (Alafia River State Park)
- 5th Place: November 7 FSC #5 - Florida State Championship Series, CC#1 Sunrise, FL (Markham Park)
- 4th Place: November 14 FSC #6 - Florida State Championship Series Alachua, FL (San Felasco Trails)
- 4th Place: November 21 FSC #7 - Florida State Championship Series, CC#2 Alva, FL (Chattahoochee Regional Park)
- 2nd Place: December 5 CC #3 - Coconut Cup South Florida Championship series Hialeah, FL (Amelia Earhart Park)
- 1st Place: December 12 FSC #8 - Florida State Championship Series Ocala, FL (Santos Trails)
- 2nd Overall Cat 2 19-29 In 2010 State Series

== Major results ==
- 2011 10th Place at the USA National MTB Championships
- 2011 1st Overall in the Coconut Cup 19-29 Class
- 2010 2nd Overall in the Florida State Championship 19-29 Class
- 2002 1st Place Sunshine State Games
- 2002 2nd Place Overall Florida Spring Series
- 2001 Florida Junior Expert State Champion
- 2001 Award For Most Improved Rider in 2001
- 2000 3rd Place Overall in the Florida State Championship
- 1999 3rd Place in the Sea Otter Classic
- 1999 Sand Blaster Overall Champion
