= Filippo Barbieri (historian) =

Dominican inquisitor and historian

Filippo Barbieri or Philippus de Barberiis (1426–87) was a Dominican inquisitor and historian from Syracuse. He composed two, or possibly three chronicles in Latin prose.
