= 2nd Street station =

2nd Street station may refer to:

- 2nd Street station (Hudson–Bergen Light Rail), in Hoboken, New Jersey
- 2nd Street station (SEPTA), in Philadelphia, Pennsylvania
- Northeast 2nd Street station, proposed in Boca Raton, Florida

== See also ==
- 2nd Street (disambiguation)
