= Arlen Specter US Squash Center =

Squash venue in Philadelphia, Pennsylvania, U.S.

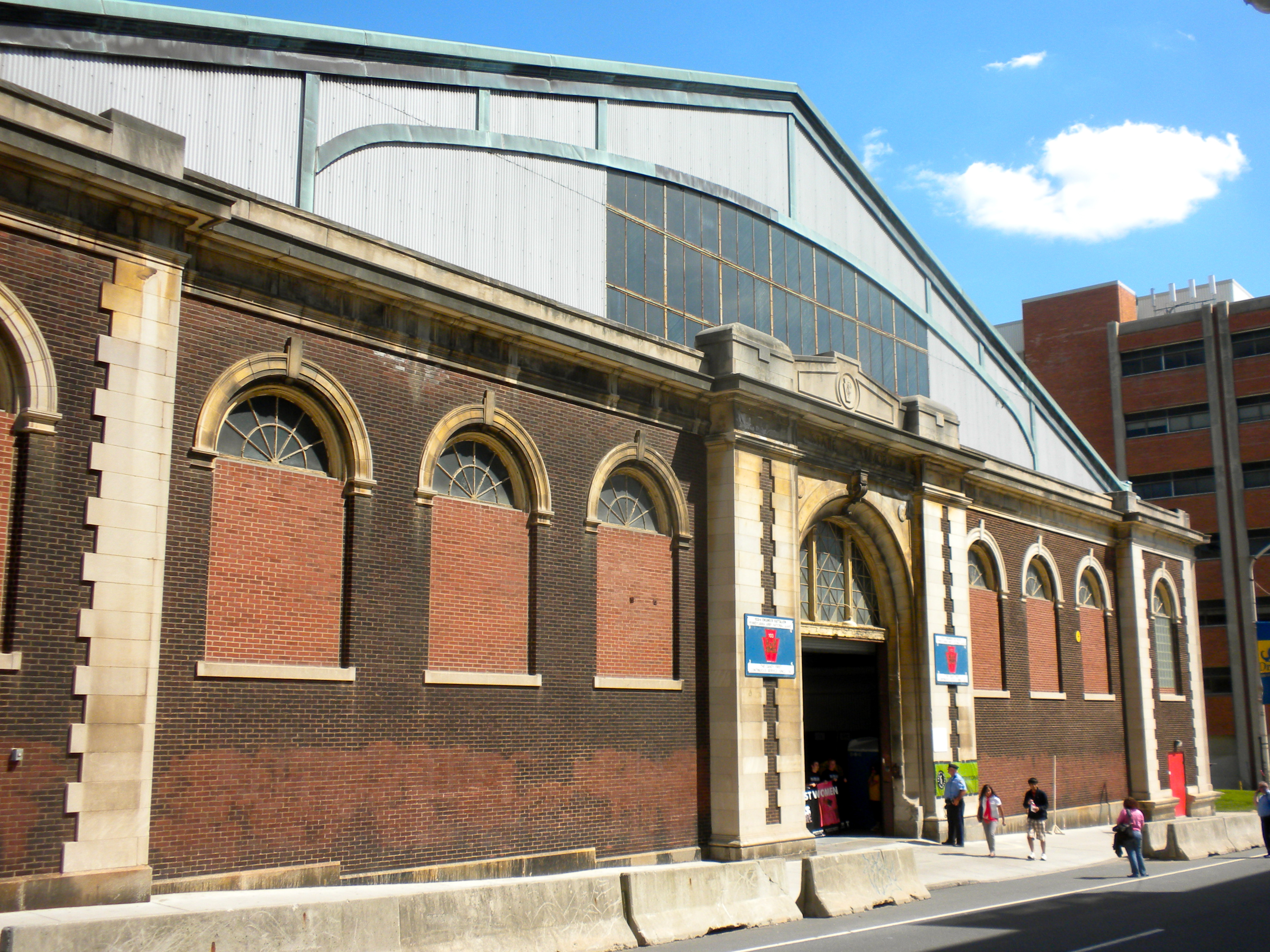
- Specter Center (before renovations), May 2010
- Interactive map of Arlen Specter US Squash Center
- Address: 3205 Lancaster Avenue
- Location: Philadelphia, Pennsylvania
- Operator: US Squash
- Capacity: 1,500
- Acreage: 1.5 acres (0.61 ha)
- Public transit: SEPTA Metro: (33rd Street); (34th Street)
- 32nd St. and Lancaster Ave. Philadelphia Armory
- U.S. National Register of Historic Places
- Location within Philadelphia Location within Pennsylvania Location within the United States
- Coordinates: 39°57′25″N 75°11′25″W
- Built: 1916
- Built by: Fidelity Construction Co.
- Architect: Johnson, Philip H.
- Architectural style: Classical Revival
- MPS: Pennsylvania National Guard Armories MPS
- NRHP reference No.: 91001703
- Added to NRHP: November 14, 1991

Construction
- Opened: 1916
- Renovated: 2019–2021
- Reopened: October 2, 2021 (renovations)
- Cost: $150,000 (original) $40 million (renovations)

Tenant
- Drexel Dragons (NCAA) (1969–1975)

The Arlen Specter US Squash Center (formerly known as the 32nd St. and Lancaster Ave. Philadelphia Armory and the Drexel Armory), is a squash venue and historic former National Guard armory located in the University City neighborhood of Philadelphia, Pennsylvania. Located on the campus of Drexel University, the venue was originally built in 1916 and operated as an armory and multi-purpose venue for nearly a century. It was added to the National Register of Historic Places in 1991.

Drexel University leased parts of the armory beginning in 2008, using the venue as a multipurpose facility. In 2019, the armory closed to begin construction to renovate the venue into a squash facility. Renovations were completed in 2021, and the new Specter Center currently serves as the headquarters for US Squash.

== History ==
=== 32nd Street Armory ===
The original 32nd St. and Lancaster Ave. Armory was built in 1916 as a three-story, 21,346 square-foot facility. Designed by architect Philip H. Johnson, the building features a Classical Revival design. Beginning in the 1920s, the armory housed the 103rd Engineering Battalion of the Pennsylvania Army National Guard, a historic unit tracing back to the American Revolution. A museum displaying a collection of artifacts from the unit was located inside the armory.

The armory also served as a multi-purpose event venue. In 1967, it hosted three regional games of that year's NCAA College Division basketball tournament, and served as the home arena of the Drexel Dragons men's basketball team from 1969 to 1975. The armory also served as a concert venue, hosting acts such as Nirvana, The Notorious B.I.G., Run-DMC, and Snoop Dogg.

In 2008, Drexel University leased parts of the armory with plans to renovate it into a full-time basketball arena and event space for the university. However, feasibility studies found renovations to be too expensive, and instead the university focused on renovating their current arena, the Daskalakis Athletic Center.

=== Specter Center ===
In 2018, US Squash announced an agreement with Drexel University to convert the armory into the largest squash facility in the United States. Renovations were completed in 2021, and the facility reopened as the Arlen Specter US Squash Center. The center was named after former United States Senator Arlen Specter, who was an avid squash player during his tenure in Congress. The Specter Center features 16 singles courts, two doubles courts, and two showcase courts.

== Concerts ==
=== Drexel homecoming dance concert ===
The annual homecoming dance concert was held at the former armory during the last week of January each year from 2009 to 2014. Following the 2014 concert, the event was replaced by the Drexel Fall Fest. Headlining performances included:

- 2014: DJ Carnage, GRiZ, ScHoolboy Q, Trinidad James
- 2013: Porter Robinson, Flosstradamus, Waka Flocka Flame
- 2012: Snoop Dogg, Wynter Gordon, DJ Serafin
- 2011:
- 2010: Sean Paul, Jay Sean, DJ Serafin, Vita Chambers, East Hundred, Oh Snap!
- 2009: G-Eazy, Chiddy Bang, Mike Jones, DJ Jazzy Jeff

=== Drexel Spring Jam ===
The annual Spring Jam concert, which is organized by the Drexel CAB, is generally held during the Spring semester. The Spring Jam was performed at the former armory until it was relocated to Lot F, an open parking area on Drexel's campus between Main Building and 31st Street, beginning in 2011. The headlining acts of the Spring Jam concerts performed at the armory included:

- 2010: N.E.R.D., Kevin Rudolf
- 2009: Girl Talk, Lupe Fiasco
- 2008: Ben Folds
- 2007: Jack's Mannequin

=== Other concerts ===
- January 27, 2017: Lil Uzi Vert, Mija, Valentino Khan
- February 18, 2012: Alesso, LA Riots
- May 5, 2010: Dave Hause
- June 5, 2008: M.I.A., Holy Fuck
- September 29, 1996: Goldfinger
- December 10, 1994: Run–DMC, Method Man, Wu-Tang Clan, Warren G, Naughty by Nature, Dogg Pound, Craig Mack, Notorious B.I.G., Kid Capri
- December 7, 1994: Toad the Wet Sprocket, Milla Jovovich
- November 11, 1993: Digable Planets, Gumbo
- November 8, 1993: Nirvana, The Breeders, Half Japanese
- October 14, 1993: The Mighty Mighty Bosstones, Ruder Than You, Love Seed Mama Jump, Strange as Angels, Mr. Greengenes, Public Service, Tribes
- October 1, 1993: Cypress Hill, House of Pain, Funkdoobiest, The Whooliganz
