= Inter Miami CF Stadium =

Soccer stadium in Fort Lauderdale, Florida

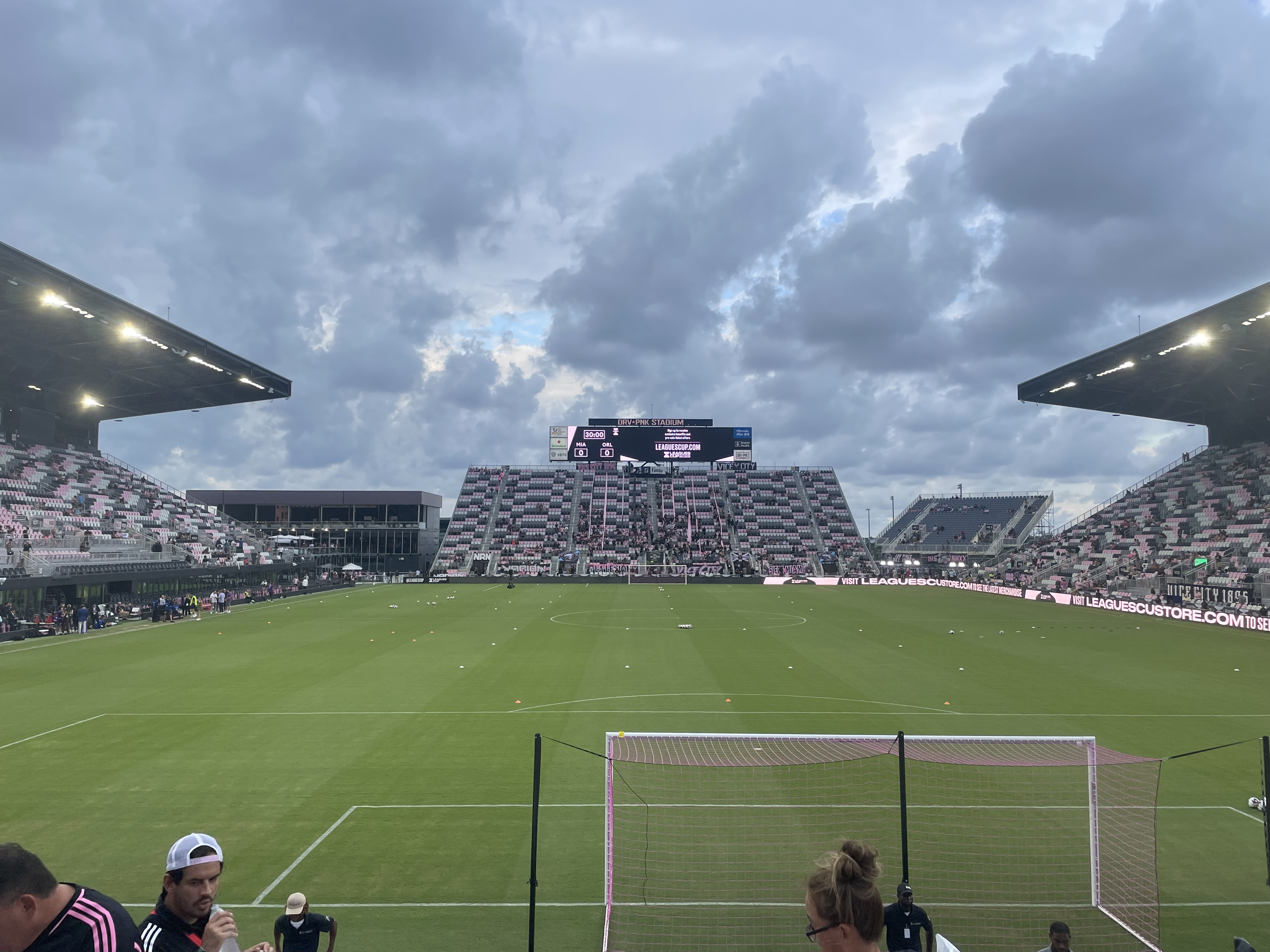
- The stadium photographed in 2023

- Location in Florida Location in the United States
- Former names: Inter Miami CF Stadium (2020–2021); DRV PNK Stadium (2021–2024); Chase Stadium (2024–2025)
- Address: 1350 NW 55th Street; Fort Lauderdale; United States
- Location: Fort Lauderdale, Florida, United States
- Coordinates: 26°11′36″N 80°09′38″W
- Owner: City of Fort Lauderdale
- Operator: Inter Miami CF
- Capacity: 21,550
- Surface: Grass
- Public transit: Broward County Transit: 55; Tri-Rail: Cypress Creek station

Construction
- Groundbreaking: May 8, 2019
- Opened: July 18, 2020
- Cost: $60 million
- Architect: MANICA Architecture

Tenants
- Inter Miami (MLS) (2020–2026); Inter Miami II (MLSNP) (2020–present)

Website
- Inter Miami CF Stadium

Inter Miami CF Stadium is a soccer-specific stadium in Fort Lauderdale, Florida, United States. Built on the site of the former Lockhart Stadium, the 21,550-seat stadium is the home pitch of MLS Next Pro side Inter Miami CF II. The stadium opened in 2020 as an interim venue for Inter Miami CF until the completion of Nu Stadium in 2026.

The stadium is the primary headquarters for the team and its youth academy, in addition to further training grounds.

== History ==
The Fort Lauderdale Strikers announced in 2016 that they were moving out of Lockhart Stadium, after which the stadium fell into a state of disrepair. In January 2019, Major League Soccer expansion team Inter Miami CF announced its intentions to pursue the Lockhart Stadium site to serve as the club's training ground for its first team, youth academy, and then-future USL League One (USL1) team Fort Lauderdale CF. The Fort Lauderdale city council unanimously approved Inter Miami's bid for the Lockhart Stadium site in March 2019. In April, the Fort Lauderdale City Commission gave approval to Inter Miami to begin the demolition process.

On July 9, 2019, the Fort Lauderdale City Commission unanimously approved a 50-year lease agreement for the Lockhart Stadium site with Inter Miami; under the terms of the agreement, the city of Fort Lauderdale will retain ownership of the property while Inter Miami will be responsible for the construction, operation, and maintenance of the new facilities. The stadium is intended to be an interim facility for Inter Miami CF until the completion of the Miami Freedom Park stadium in Miami in 2026; the expansion franchise was granted on the condition that a stadium eventually be built in Miami.

On November 13, 2019, Inter Miami CF announced that the club's inaugural home match would be scheduled for March 14, 2020, against the LA Galaxy. Due to the COVID-19 pandemic, the MLS season was paused. Fort Lauderdale CF therefore played the first match of the new stadium, a 0–2 loss to Greenville Triumph SC. Inter Miami CF would not play home matches until August 22, 2020, when they beat their in-state rival Orlando City SC 3–2 in the first MLS match at the stadium.

On April 8, 2021, it was reported that Inter Miami CF had reached a naming rights agreement with Fort Lauderdale-based car retailer AutoNation; the agreement was officially announced the next day. The stadium was branded as DRV PNK Stadium, a tie-in with AutoNation's breast cancer awareness campaign (with pink also being one of Inter Miami's main kit colors).

On February 20, 2024, the day before Inter Miami CF's opening match of the 2024 regular season, the team announced a new naming rights deal with JPMorgan Chase, renaming the stadium to Chase Stadium.

Following the 2025 season, and with the team's move to Nu Stadium in Miami, the stadium reverted to its original name, Inter Miami CF Stadium.

=== Expansion ===
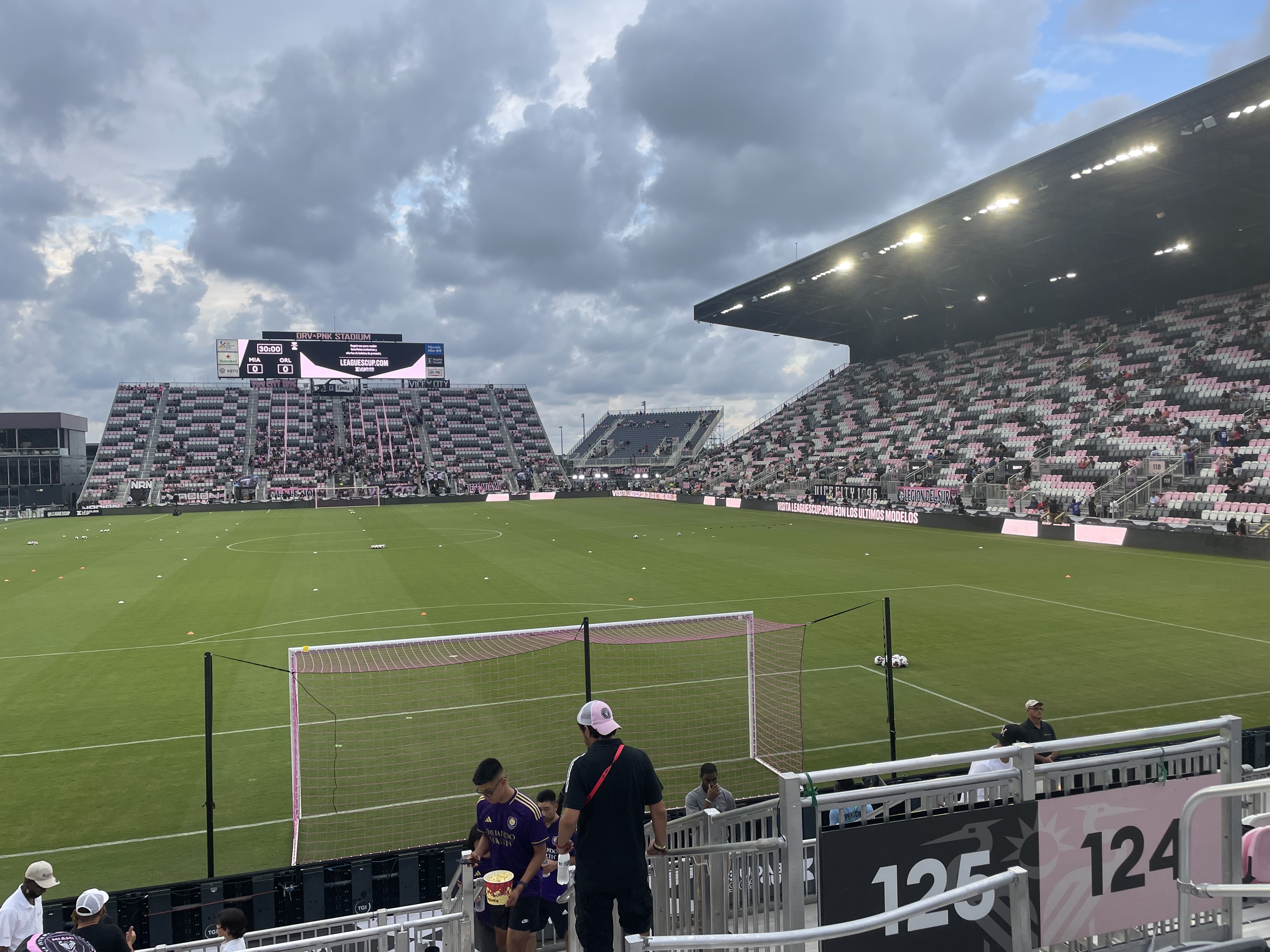
Inter Miami CF Stadium seen with the new seats (center)

Following Lionel Messi's June 2023 announcement of his planned move to Inter Miami CF, the club's managing owner Jorge Mas stated that the corners of the stadium would be filled to add 3,000 to 3,200 seats to handle some of the expected demand. The new sections use bleacher seating from the Miami International Autodrome, the temporary Formula One circuit built at Hard Rock Stadium for the Miami Grand Prix.

The Fort Lauderdale city government announced on June 21 that Inter Miami CF would need to cease work on the seating expansion due to alleged installations done without permits; the club claimed that no work had commenced. An agreement between the club and the city was quickly struck to resolve the permitting dispute, as well as outstanding payments the club owed for a temporary parking lot used by the stadium that is planned to be converted to a public park. The 3,000 new seats were completed ahead of Messi's unveiling on July 16, along with new security measures and barriers on the pitch and near the players entrance. The press box was expanded from 37 to 52 seats with an auxiliary area that is adjusted based on demand.

A second expansion was completed in January 2024 that increased capacity to 21,550 seats. A new section in the southwest corner, along with more seats in the northeast and southeast corners, added 1,200 seats; the expansion also included six "opera boxes" and nine "theatre boxes" with suite-like seats.

== Soccer ==
During the 2021 MLS season, CF Montréal used the stadium to play their home matches since the start of the season after travel restrictions prevented the team from playing their matches in Montreal. The team will return to the stadium for the home opener of the 2027 season due to potential weather issues.

On December 6, 2025, Inter Miami CF Stadium hosted MLS Cup 2025, where Inter Miami CF defeated Vancouver Whitecaps FC 3–1 to win their first MLS Cup title. This was also the final MLS home game for Inter Miami CF at the stadium. In March 2026, the team returned for a 2026 CONCACAF Champions Cup match.

=== International matches ===
Date	Home	Result	Away	Tournament	Spectators
December 9, 2020	United States	6–0	El Salvador	International friendly	2,500
July 2, 2021	Haiti	6–1	Saint Vincent and the Grenadines	2021 CONCACAF Gold Cup qualification – First Round	2,601
July 2, 2021	Trinidad and Tobago	6–1	Montserrat	2021 CONCACAF Gold Cup qualification – First Round	7,425
July 2, 2021	Bermuda	8–1	Barbados	2021 CONCACAF Gold Cup qualification – First Round	2,025
July 3, 2021	Guatemala	4–0	Guyana	2021 CONCACAF Gold Cup qualification – First Round	17,161
July 3, 2021	Guadeloupe	2–0	Bahamas	2021 CONCACAF Gold Cup qualification – First Round	100
July 3, 2021	Cuba	0–3	French Guiana	2021 CONCACAF Gold Cup qualification – First Round	0
July 6, 2021	Haiti	4–1	Bermuda	2021 CONCACAF Gold Cup qualification – Second Round	3,448
July 6, 2021	Guatemala	1–1 (9–10)	Guadeloupe	2021 CONCACAF Gold Cup qualification – Second Round	3,571
July 6, 2021	Trinidad and Tobago	1–1 (8–7)	French Guiana	2021 CONCACAF Gold Cup qualification – Second Round	1,124
March 27, 2022	Guatemala	2–1	Haiti	International friendly	unknown
June 11, 2022	Ecuador	1–0	Cape Verde	International friendly	4,950
November 10, 2022	United States	1–2	Germany	Women's International friendly	16,917
November 19, 2022	Colombia	2–0	Paraguay	International friendly	18,000
June 16, 2023	Antigua and Barbuda	0–5	Guadeloupe	2023 CONCACAF Gold Cup qualification – First Round	
June 16, 2023	Martinique	3–1	Saint Lucia	2023 CONCACAF Gold Cup qualification – First Round	
June 16, 2023	Curaçao	1–1 (2–3)	Saint Kitts and Nevis	2023 CONCACAF Gold Cup qualification – First Round	
June 17, 2023	French Guiana	4–1	Sint Maarten	2023 CONCACAF Gold Cup qualification – First Round	
June 17, 2023	Suriname	0–0 (3–4)	Puerto Rico	2023 CONCACAF Gold Cup qualification – First Round	
June 17, 2023	Guyana	1–1 (5–4)	Grenada	2023 CONCACAF Gold Cup qualification – First Round	
June 20, 2023	Guadeloupe	2–0	Guyana	2023 CONCACAF Gold Cup qualification – Second Round	
June 20, 2023	Martinique	2–0	Puerto Rico	2023 CONCACAF Gold Cup qualification – Second Round	
June 20, 2023	Saint Kitts and Nevis	1–1 (4–2)	French Guiana	2023 CONCACAF Gold Cup qualification – Second Round	
June 25, 2023	Trinidad and Tobago	3–0	Saint Kitts and Nevis	2023 CONCACAF Gold Cup Group A	3,646
June 26, 2023	El Salvador	1–2	Martinique	2023 CONCACAF Gold Cup Group C	10,101
June 26, 2023	Costa Rica	1–2	Panama	2023 CONCACAF Gold Cup Group C	10,101
June 27, 2023	Guatemala	1–0	Cuba	2023 CONCACAF Gold Cup Group D	13,426
July 8, 2023	(Colombia) Millonarios	1–0	(Colombia) Atlético Nacional	Friendly	
September 3, 2023	Guatemala	0–0	Honduras	International friendly	
December 2, 2023	United States	3–0	China	Women's International friendly	8,768
December 10, 2023	Colombia	1–0	Venezuela	International friendly	
January 13, 2024	Guatemala	0–1	Iceland	International friendly	
January 17, 2024	Honduras	0–2	Iceland	International friendly	
March 21, 2024	Italy	2–1	Venezuela	International friendly	
August 3, 2024	(England) Wolverhampton Wanderers	3–0	(Germany) RB Leipzig	Friendly	
January 18, 2025	United States	3–1	Venezuela	International friendly	18,008
January 19, 2025	(Brazil) São Paulo FC	0–0	(Brazil) Flamengo	2025 Florida Cup	
October 14, 2025	Argentina	6–0	Puerto Rico	International friendly	
November 15, 2025	Colombia	2–1	New Zealand	International friendly	
November 18, 2025	Venezuela	0–2	Canada	International friendly	
December 1, 2025	United States	2–0	Italy	Women's International friendly	9,471
June 2, 2026	Haiti	4–0	New Zealand	International friendly	
June 6, 2026	Turkey	2–1	Venezuela	International friendly	14,000
December 13, 2026	United States		Jamaica	International friendly	

== American football ==
Inter Miami CF Stadium has also hosted American football games, including the Miami Hurricanes spring game, and the Florida High School Athletic Association state championships. The stadium is used for local regular season high school football games as well, with some schools which played games at the stadium including Fort Lauderdale High School, Pine Crest School, American Heritage School, and North Broward Preparatory School.

In September 2023, the stadium was announced as the venue for the inaugural Florida Beach Bowl, a college football bowl game for teams from historically black colleges and universities (HBCUs) within NCAA Division II.

== Transportation ==
Inter Miami CF Stadium is located near Interstate 95 at its junction with Commercial Boulevard (State Route 870) in Fort Lauderdale. The stadium has three designated parking lots for pre-purchased ticketholders and an additional lot for other visitors. The nearest Tri-Rail commuter rail station is Cypress Creek, but additional nighttime train service is not provided for Inter Miami CF matches.

In April 2022, Inter Miami CF announced a partnership with Brightline to provide passenger trains from Miami and West Palm Beach to Fort Lauderdale station with a dedicated shuttle for fans. The service, named the GOOOL Getter, will have three round-trips before and after home matches.
