= East hundred =

East hundred may refer to:

- East (Cornish hundred), Cornwall, England
- East Rutland, a hundred of Rutland, England
- East Hundred (band)
