= Hillsboro Boulevard station =

Railway station in Deerfield Beach, Florida

Hillsboro Boulevard

General information
- Location: East Hillsboro Boulevard & Dixie Highway; Deerfield Beach, Florida
- Line: Florida East Coast Railway
- Tracks: 2

Proposed services
Preceding station	Tri-Rail	Following station
Atlantic Boulevard toward Fort Lauderdale	Green Line (proposed)	Northeast 2nd Street toward Toney Penna

Hillsboro Boulevard is a proposed Tri-Rail Coastal Link Green Line station in Deerfield Beach, Florida. The station is slated for construction at Hillboro Boulevard (SR 810) and Dixie Highway, west of Federal Highway (US 1).
