= Atlantic Boulevard station =

Railway station in Pompano Beach, Florida

Atlantic Boulevard

General information
- Location: Northeast 1st Street & Dixie Highway; Pompano Beach, Florida
- Line: Florida East Coast Railway
- Tracks: 2

Proposed services
Preceding station	Tri-Rail	Following station
38th Street toward Fort Lauderdale	Green Line (proposed)	Hillsboro Boulevard toward Toney Penna
38th Street toward Downtown Miami	Red Line (proposed)	Pompano Beach toward Mangonia Park

Atlantic Boulevard is a proposed Tri-Rail Coastal Link Green Line and Red Line station in Pompano Beach, Florida. The station is planned for construction at Dixie Highway (co-signed Florida State Road 811) and Northeast First Street, just north of Atlantic Boulevard (SR 814) and about 1 mile (1.6 km) west of Federal Highway (US 1).
