= 45th Street station (Tri-Rail) =

Railway station in West Palm Beach, Florida

45th Street

General information
- Location: 45th Street between Greenwood & Pinewood Avenues; West Palm Beach, Florida
- Coordinates: 26.753033°N 80.060273°W
- Line: Florida East Coast Railway
- Tracks: 2

Proposed services
Preceding station	Tri-Rail	Following station
West Palm Beach toward Fort Lauderdale	Green Line (proposed)	13th Street toward Toney Penna
Location

45th Street is a proposed Tri-Rail Coastal Link Green Line station in West Palm Beach, Florida. The station is planned for construction at 45th Street between Greenwood Avenue and Pinewood Avenue, just west Broadway (US 1).
