= 13th Street station =

13th Street station may refer to:

- 13th Street station (DC Streetcar), a streetcar stop in Washington, D.C.
- 13th Street station (Sacramento), a light rail station in Sacramento, California
- 13th Street station (SEPTA), an underground transit station in Philadelphia, Pennsylvania
- 13th Street station (Tri-Rail), a proposed commuter rail station in Riviera Beach, Florida

== See also ==
- 13th Street (disambiguation)
