= Park Avenue station (Tri-Rail) =

Railway station in Lake Park, Florida

Park Avenue

General information
- Location: Park Avenue & Old Dixie Highway; Lake Park, Florida
- Line: Florida East Coast Railway
- Tracks: 2

Proposed services
Preceding station	Tri-Rail	Following station
13th Street toward Fort Lauderdale	Green Line (proposed)	PGA Boulevard toward Toney Penna

Park Avenue is a proposed Tri-Rail Coastal Link Green Line station in Lake Park, Florida. The station is planned for construction at Old Dixie Highway and Park Avenue.
