= Weitzman National Museum of American Jewish History =

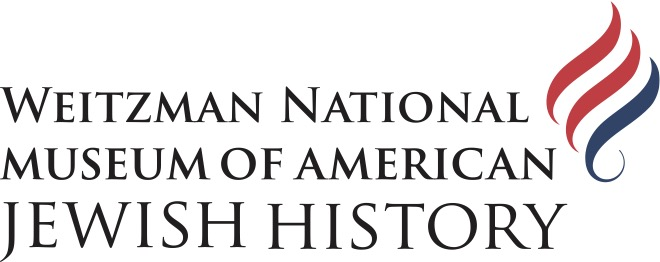

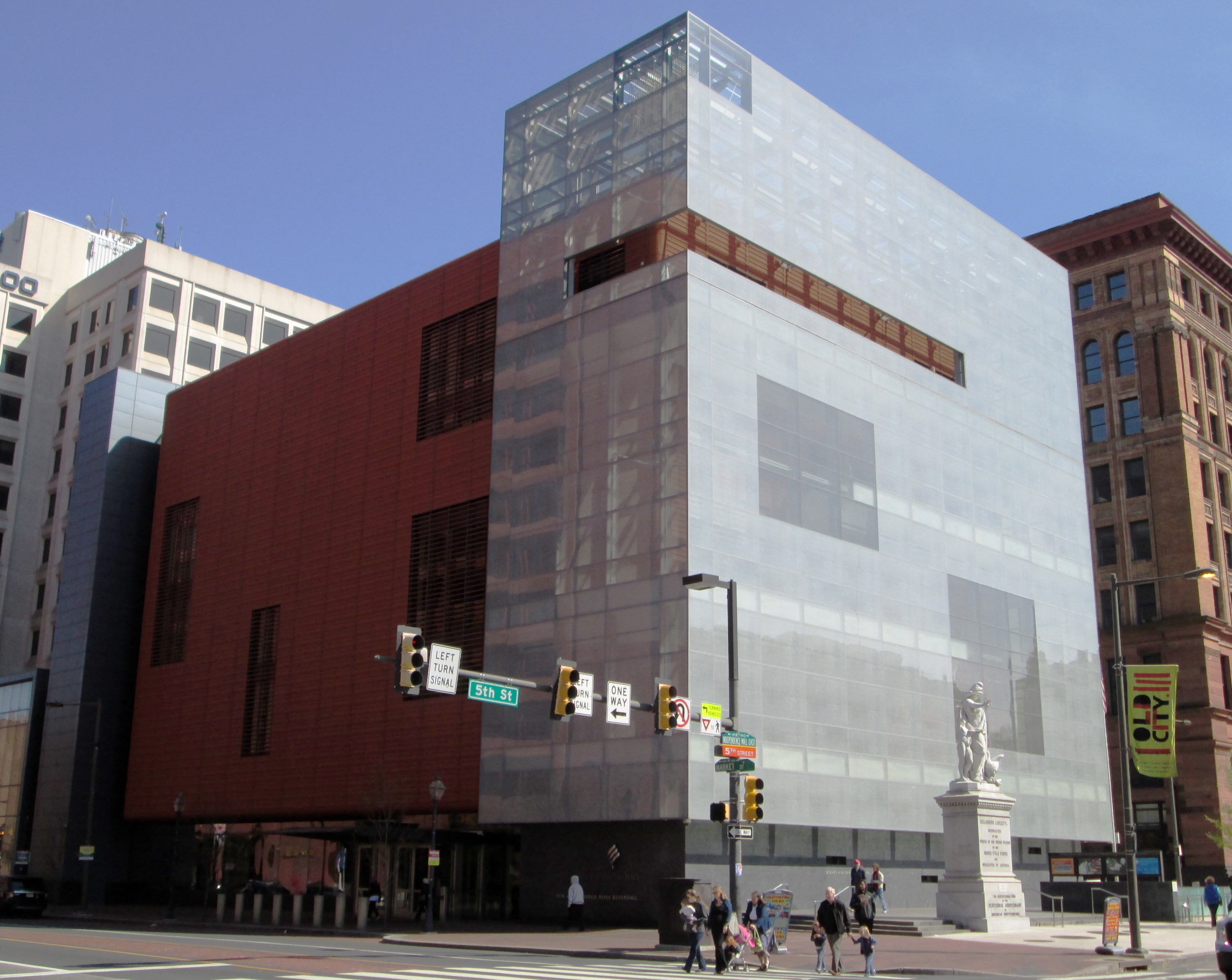

- Location within Philadelphia
- Former name: National Museum of American Jewish History
- Established: 1976
- Location: Philadelphia, Pennsylvania, U.S.
- Coordinates: 39.950288°N 75.148593°W
- Type: Jewish Museum
- Collection size: 30,000 objects
- Visitors: 82,950 (2019)
- President: Dr. Misha Galperin
- Curator: Josh Perelman
- Architect: James Polshek
- Public transit access: 5th Street/Independence Hall: L SEPTA bus: 17, 33, 38, 44, 48; Philly PHLASH
- Website: www.theweitzman.org

The Weitzman National Museum of American Jewish History (The Weitzman) is located at 101 South Independence Mall East (S. 5th Street) at Market Street in Center City Philadelphia. It was founded in 1976. It has EIN 23-7379280 as a 501(c)(3) Public Charity; in 2023, it claimed total revenue of $8,234,058 and total assets of $29,222,882.

== History ==
With its founding in 1976, the then–15,000-square-foot (1,400 m^{2}) museum shared a building with the Congregation Mikveh Israel.

In 2005, it was announced that the museum would be moved to a new building to be built at Fifth Street and Market Street on the Independence Mall. The site was originally owned by CBS' KYW radio and KYW-TV. The project broke ground on September 30, 2007. The 100,000-square-foot (9,300 m^{2}) glass and terra-cotta building was designed by James Polshek and includes an atrium, a 25,000-square-foot (2,300 m^{2}) area for exhibits, a Center for Jewish Education, and a theater. The structural engineer was Leslie E. Robertson Associates.

The project, including endowment, cost $150 million. The opening ceremony was held November 14, 2010 and was attended by over 1,000 people, including Vice President Joe Biden, Mayor Michael Nutter, Governor Ed Rendell, and Rabbi Irving Greenberg. The building opened to the public November 26, 2010.

In 2012, Ivy Barsky was appointed as the CEO of the museum and she served until 2019. During her tenure the George Washington 1790 letter was given on permanent loan.

In March 2020, the museum closed as a result of the COVID-19 pandemic and staff wages were reduced. In May the museum furloughed two thirds of its staff without pay. The acting CEO was Misha Galperin who had taken over when Barsky resigned the year before. The staff were not entitled to some benefits because of the museum being in chapter 19 protection.

In March 2020, The National Museum of American Jewish History filed for Chapter 11 bankruptcy protection, seeking relief from debt incurred by the construction of its Independence Mall home. The museum's debts included over $30 million to bondholders, and an additional $500,000 to unsecured creditors; at the time of the bankruptcy filing, the museum was paying 20% of its annual budget in interest payments. The filing followed several years of decreasing attendance, revenue, and fundraising. The museum's operations were not affected by the bankruptcy. The museum exited bankruptcy in September 2021 after several creditors forgave $14 million in debt and board member Mitchell Morgan purchased the museum building for $10 million.

In August 2020, following the signing ceremony for the Great American Outdoors Act in which President Donald Trump mispronounced the name of Yosemite National Park as "yo-semites", the museum's online gift shop experienced a surge in sales for a pre-existing, similarly phrased "Yo Semite" T-shirt. Sales of the shirt, which brought in $30,000 in the three days following Trump's statement and led to continued sales thereafter, provided unexpected international publicity and required financial assistance to the museum.

In November 2021, it was announced that the museum would be renamed in honor of a generous contribution from Stuart Weitzman. The museum is now known as The Weitzman National Museum of American Jewish History.

A U.S. congressional commission is studying whether to make the museum part of the Smithsonian Institution. The commission was announced in October 2026 with Philip Darivoff, a former longtime chair of the Weitzman, as chair and author Dara Horn as vice chair. President Joe Biden in 2024 signed legislation to establish the commission.

== Exhibitions ==
Exhibits use pieces from the museum's collection which includes over 30,000 objects and ranges from the Colonial period to the present day. Exhibits have focused on the lives and experiences of Jews in America, with past exhibitions centering on Ruth Bader Ginsburg and Leonard Bernstein. Professor Jonathan Sarna of Brandeis University led the development of the core exhibit for the museum.

=== To Bigotry No Sanction: George Washington and Religious Freedom ===
In 2012, The Weitzman (then NMAJH) held a special exhibition that featured one of the most important documents pertaining to religious freedom in the United States. The letter was written in 1790 to the Hebrew Congregation in Newport, Rhode Island, addressing the new country's religious freedom. George Washington's letter expressed the new government's commitment for religious freedom and equality for all faiths. The exhibition included numerous artifacts as well as early printings of the Declaration of Independence and the Constitution.

=== Hall of Fame and Gallery ===
Established in 2010, the National Museum of American Jewish History Hall of Fame and a related permanent exhibition gallery honors the lives of prominent Jewish Americans. The initial class of eighteen inductees was chosen both by a public vote and a panel of historians and experts. Inductees were elected in one of eight categories. In its opening year, the exhibit contained a film about the inductees’ lives and artifacts, including Sandy Koufax’s baseball mitt and sheet music from Irving Berlin. The exhibition was renamed the Ed Snider 'Only in America' Gallery and Hall of Fame in honor of the former chairman of Comcast Spectacor.

Honorees of the Hall of Fame
Honoree	Category	Year Inducted	Notes
Irving Berlin	Arts & Entertainment	2010	
Leonard Bernstein	Arts & Entertainment	2010	
Louis Brandeis	Politics, Law, & Activism	2010	
Albert Einstein	Science & Medicine	2010	
Mordecai Kaplan	Religion & Thought	2010	
Sandy Koufax	Sports	2010	
Estée Lauder	Business & Philanthropy	2010	
Emma Lazarus	Literature	2010	
Isaac Leeser	Religion & Thought	2010	
Golda Meir	Politics, Law, & Activism	2010	
Jonas Salk	Science & Medicine	2010	
Menachem Mendel Schneerson	Religion & Thought	2010	
Rose Schneiderman	Politics, Law, & Activism	2010	
Isaac Bashevis Singer	Literature	2010	
Steven Spielberg	Arts & Entertainment	2010	
Barbra Streisand	Performance	2010	
Henrietta Szold	Politics, Law, & Activism	2010	
Isaac Mayer Wise	Religion & Thought	2010	
Julius Rosenwald	Business & Philanthropy	2016	
Gertrude Elion	Science & Medicine	2017	
Ruth Bader Ginsburg	Politics, Law, & Activism	2019	
Harry Houdini	Performance	2020	
David Copperfield	Performance	2020	

== From the Core Exhibition in 2010 ==
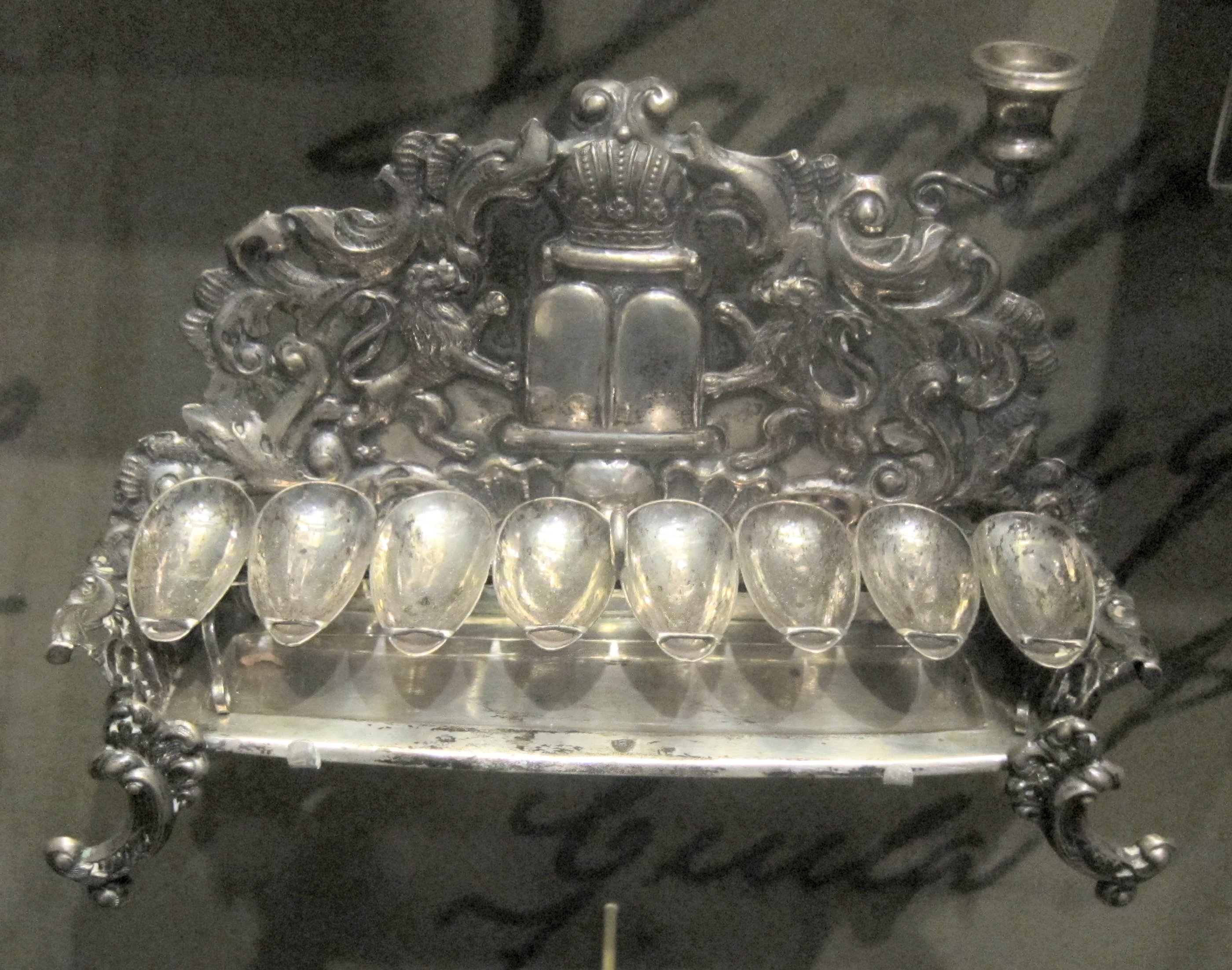
Hanukkah lamp from Lodz, Poland, prior to 1881, silver

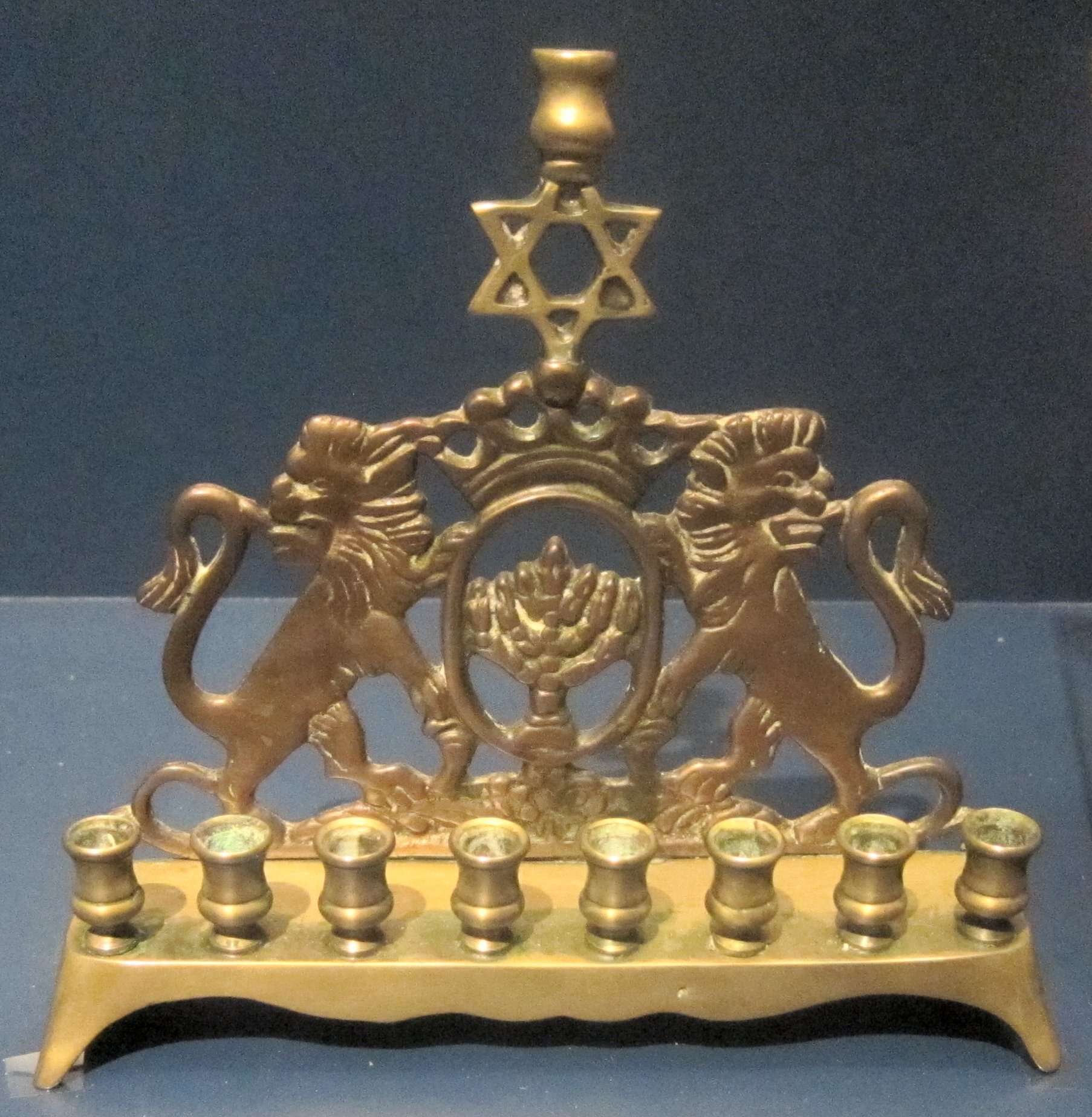
Hanukkah menorah, Russia, 1890, brass

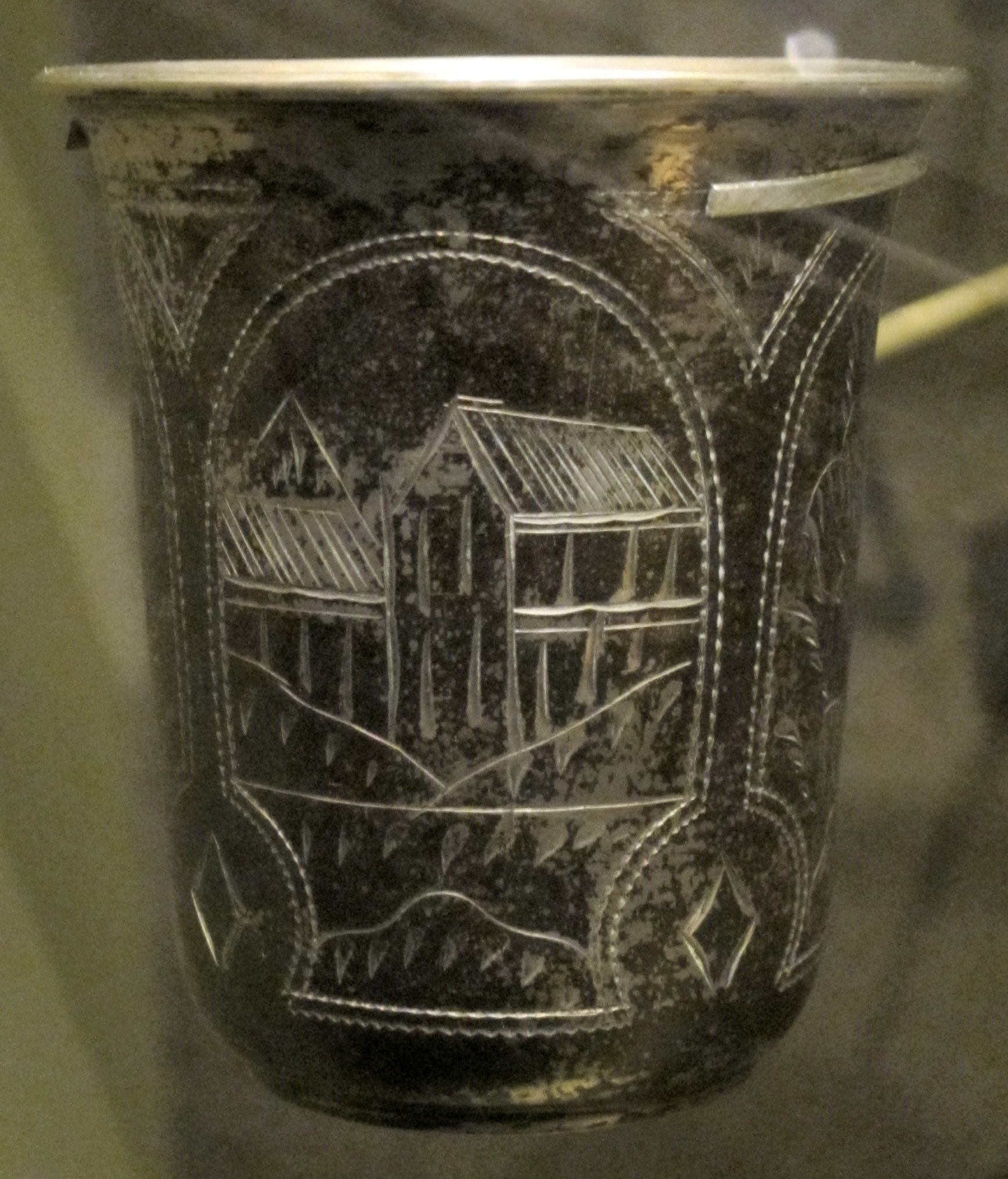
Kiddush cup from Russia, engraved sterling silver

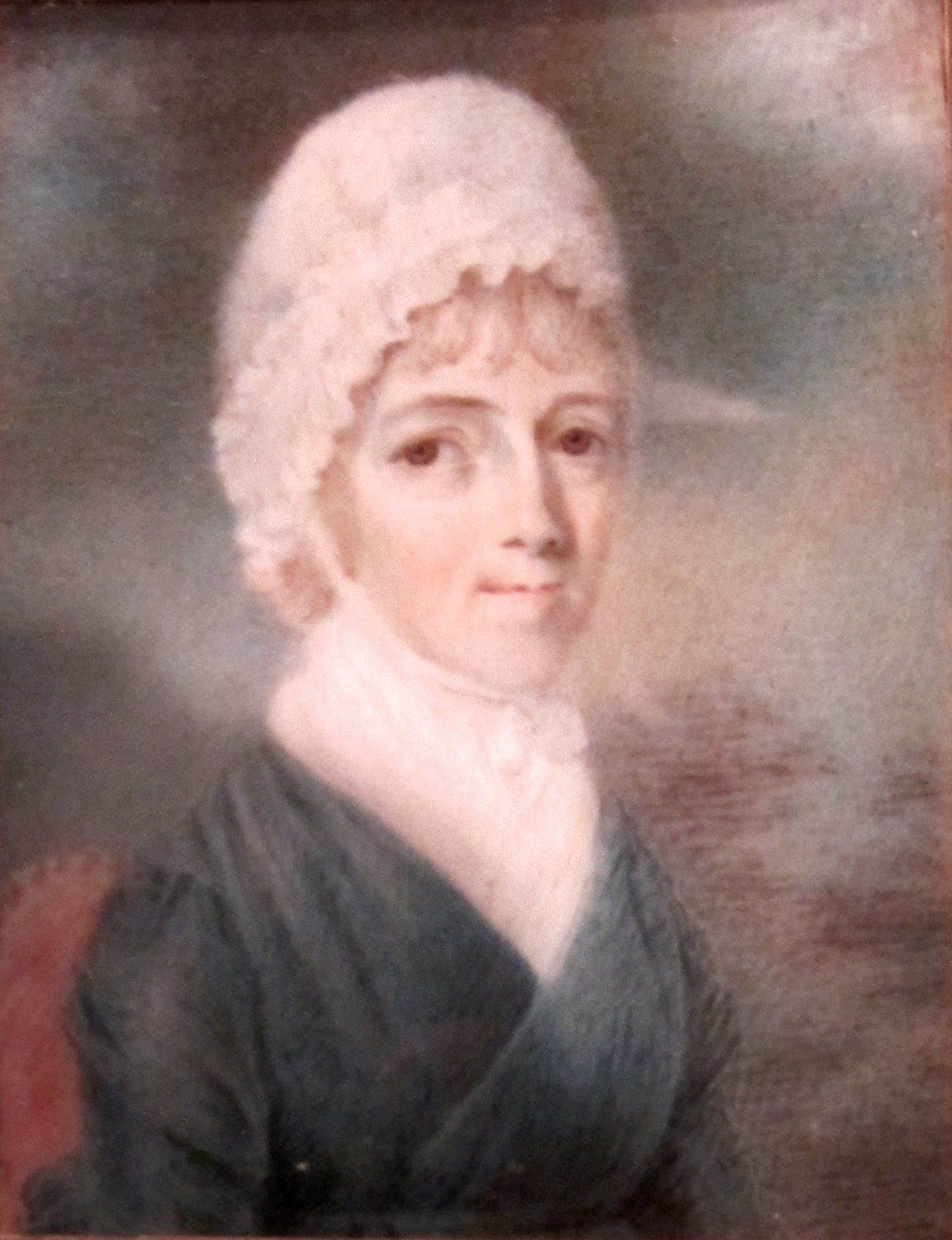
Portrait of Joyce Mears Myers by Edward Green Malbone, c. 1803, oil on ivory. No longer on view.

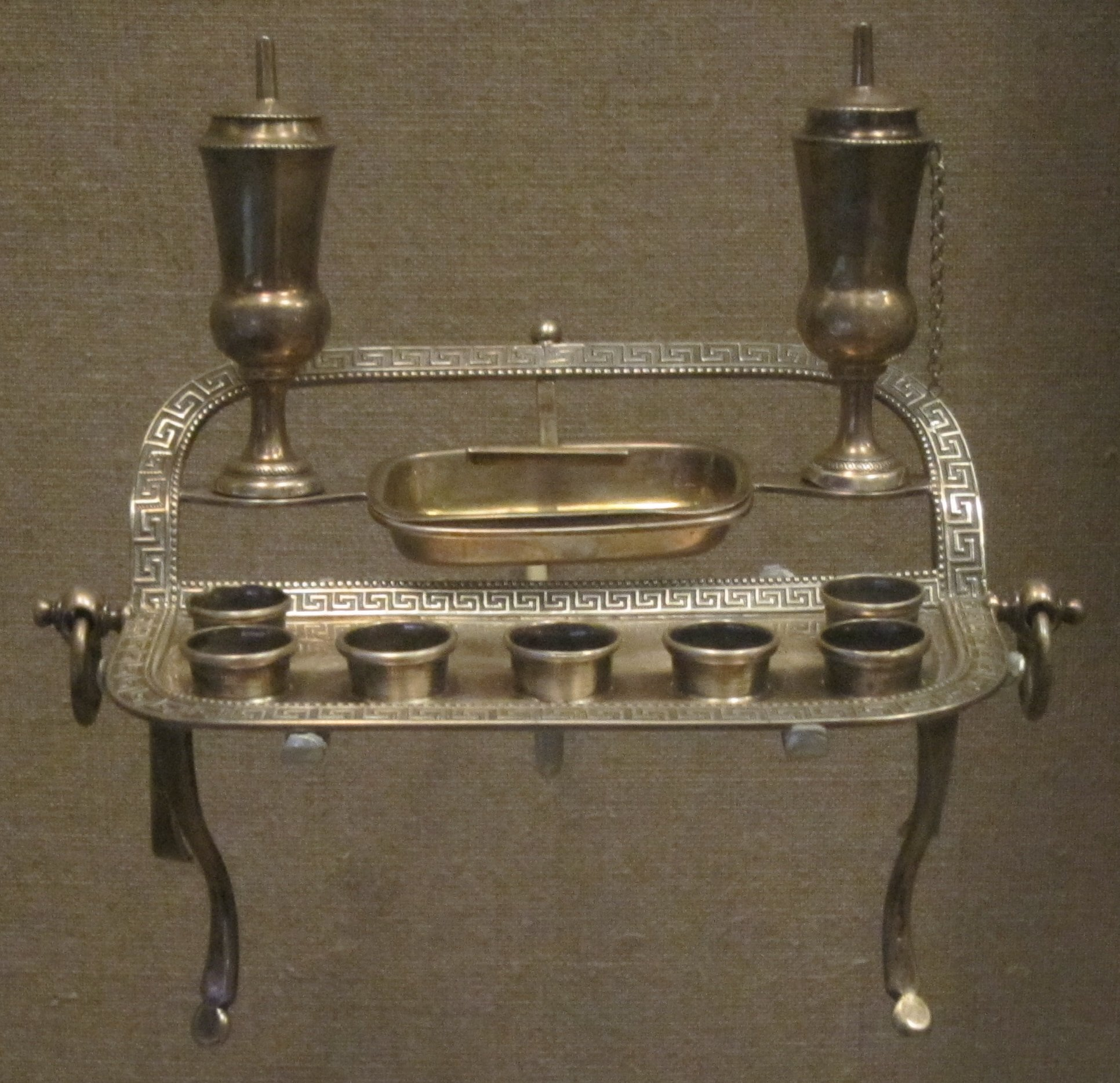
Silver menorah, William Gale and Sons, c. 1852

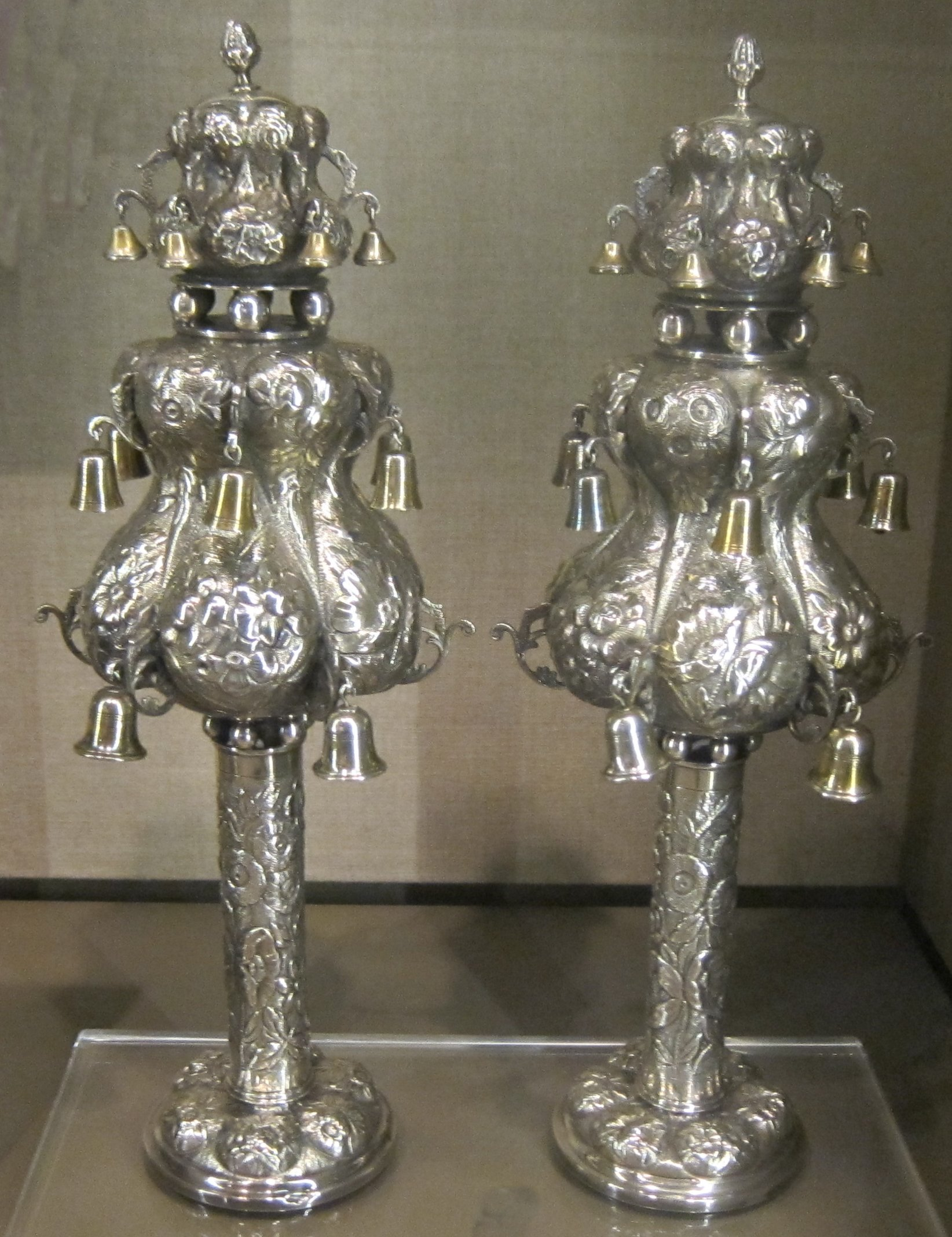
Torah finials, c. 1850, silver

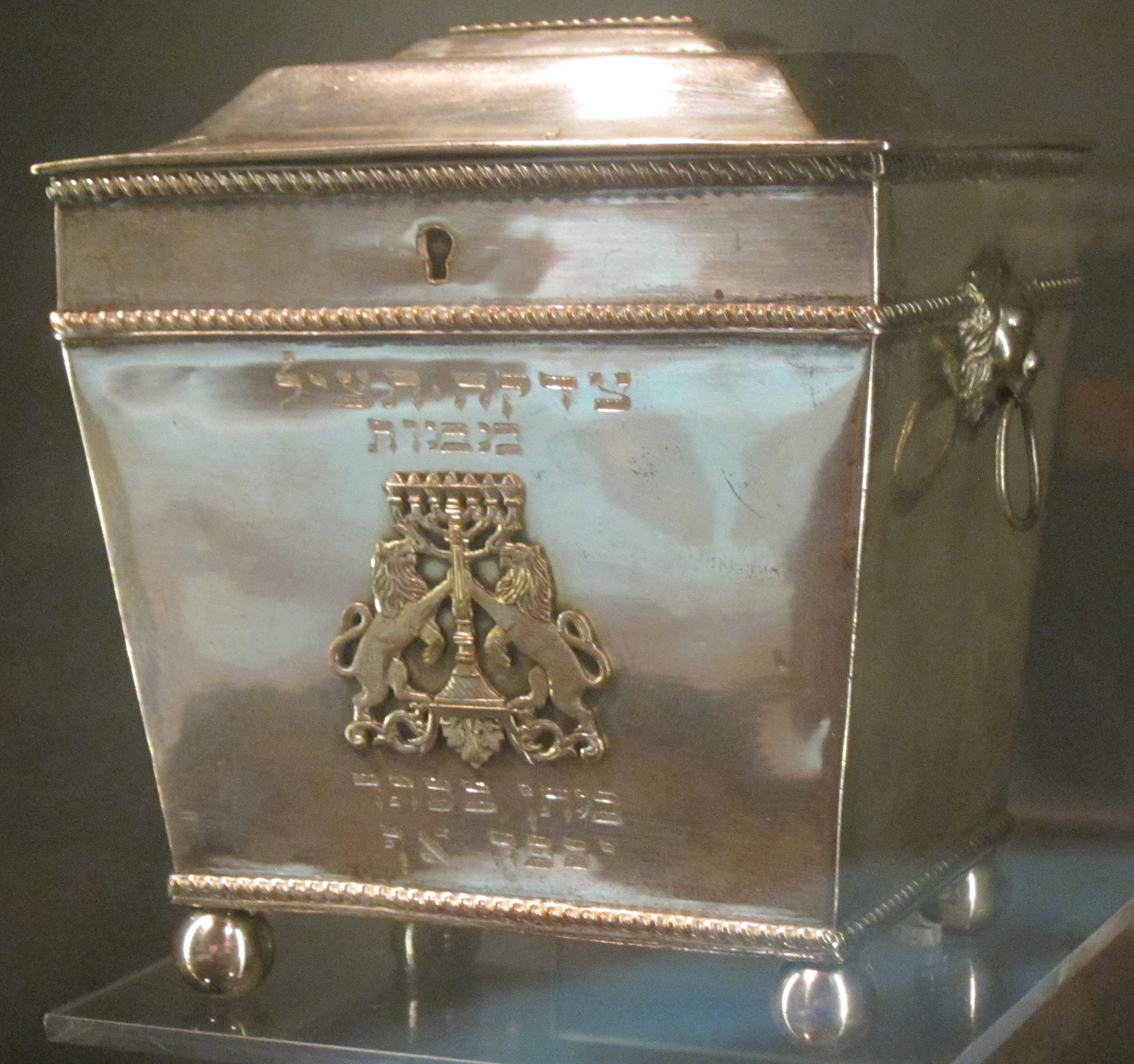
Tzedakah (charity) box or Kupat Tzedakah, Charleston, 1820, silver

== See also ==
- List of Jewish museums
- National Museum of American Jewish Military History
