= 13th Street station (Tri-Rail) =

Proposed rail station in Florida

Coordinates: 26°46′25″N 80°03′50″W

13th Street

General information
- Location: 13th Street & Barack Obama Highway; Riviera Beach, Florida
- Line: Florida East Coast Railway
- Tracks: 4

Proposed services
Preceding station	Tri-Rail	Following station
45th Street toward Fort Lauderdale	Green Line (proposed)	Park Avenue toward Toney Penna
Location

13th Street is a proposed Tri-Rail Coastal Link Green Line station in Riviera Beach, Florida. The station is planned for construction at 13th Street and President Barack Obama Highway (formerly Old Dixie Highway), just west of Broadway (US 1).
