= PGA Boulevard station =

Proposed rail station in Florida, USA

PGA Boulevard

General information
- Location: PGA Boulevard & Dixie Highway; Palm Beach Gardens, Florida
- Line: Florida East Coast Railway
- Tracks: 1

Proposed services
Preceding station	Tri-Rail	Following station
Park Avenue toward Toney Penna	Green Line (proposed)	Toney Penna Terminus
Location

PGA Boulevard is a proposed Tri-Rail Coastal Link Green Line station in Palm Beach Gardens, Florida. The station is planned for construction at Dixie Highway (SR 811) and PGA Boulevard (SR 786).
