= Daskalakis Athletic Center =

Sports facility in Philadelphia

- The DAC
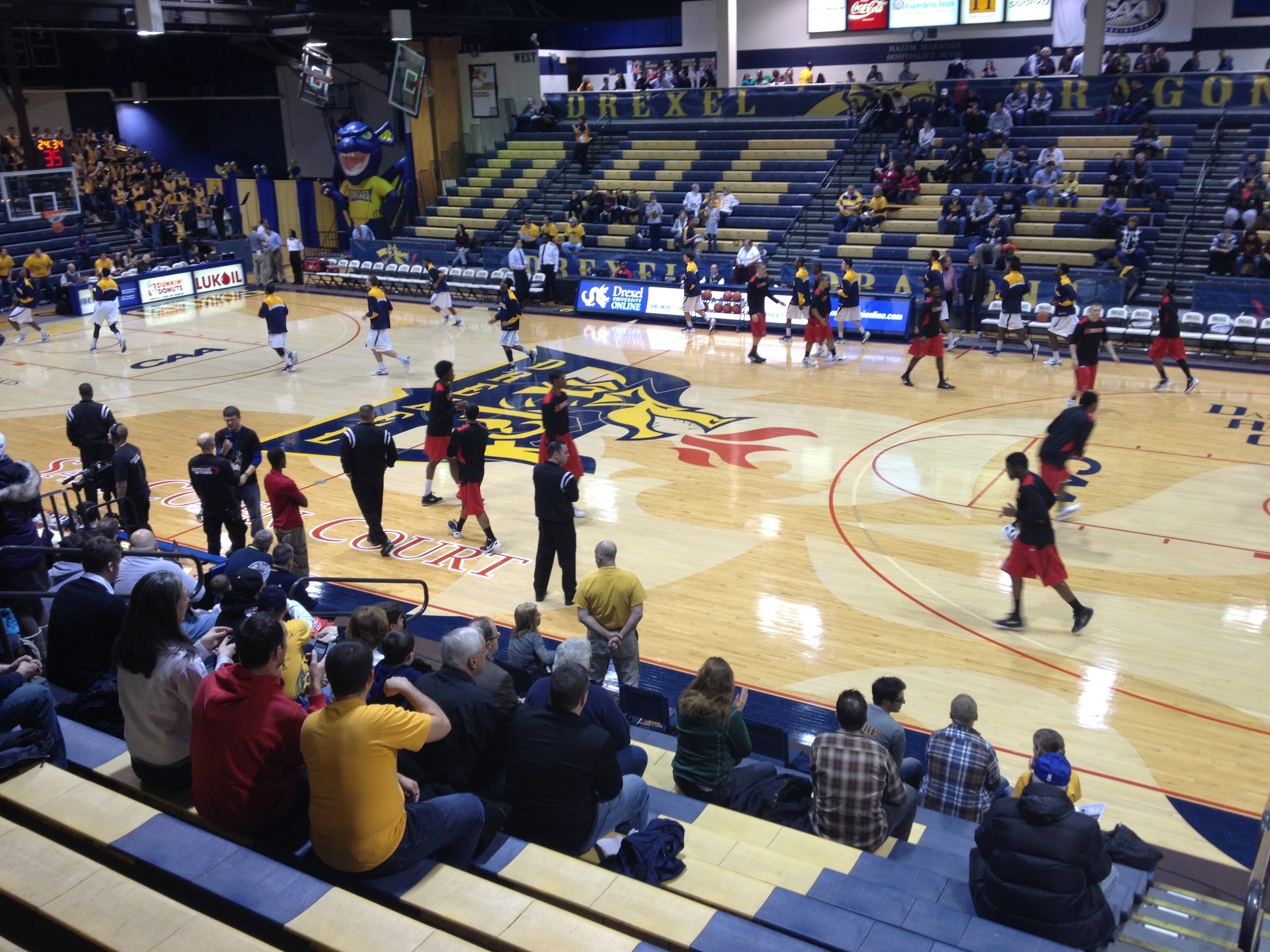
- The interior of the DAC
- Interactive map of Daskalakis Athletic Center
- Former names: Physical Education and Athletic Center (PEAC)
- Location: Philadelphia, Pennsylvania
- Coordinates: 39.956389°N 75.190833°W
- Owner: Drexel University
- Seating type: Reserved seating; General admission
- Capacity: 2,509 (basketball)
- Type: Arena
- Events: Sporting events; Concerts; Commencement
- Scoreboard: Daktronics
- Record attendance: 3,000 (basketball); 2,532 (basketball, current configuration); 4,000 (concert)
- Acreage: 3 acres (1.2 ha)
- Public transit: 34th Street station: L; SEPTA City Bus: 30, 31, LUCY; 33rd Street station: T

Construction
- Groundbreaking: 1974
- Built: 1974–1975
- Opened: February 1975
- Renovated: 2012–2016, 2022
- Expanded: 2008–2010
- Cost: $8.642 million (estimated)
- Architects: Thalheimer and Weitz

Tenants
- Drexel Dragons (NCAA) (1975–present); US Open of Squash (2011–present)

Website
- drexeldragons.com

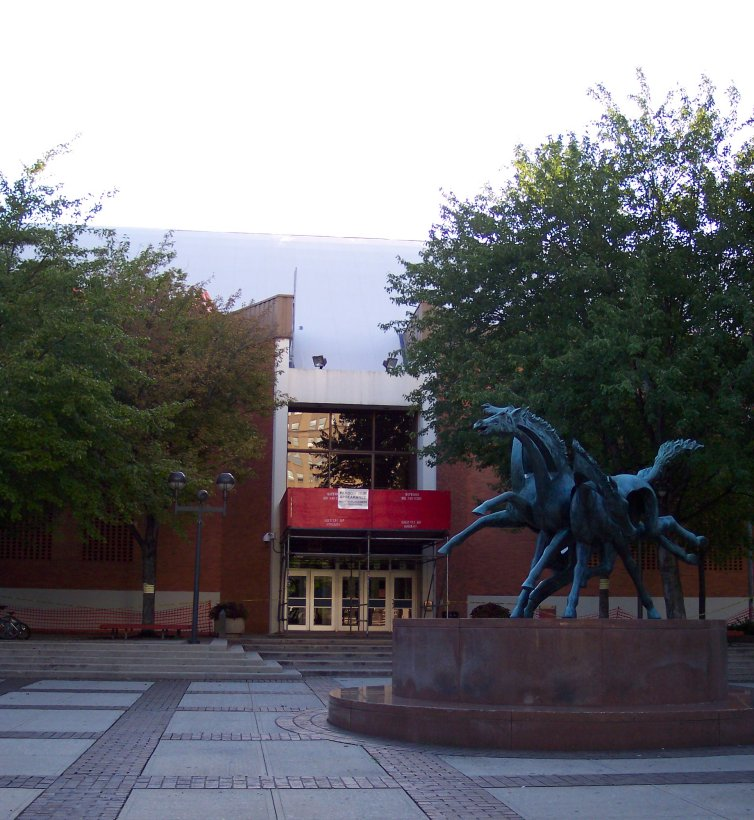
The entrance to the DAC in 2006

Daskalakis Athletic Center (DAC) is a 300,000 square feet (28,000 m^{2}) athletic and recreational facility in Philadelphia, Pennsylvania.

== Description and history ==
The facility is best known for its 2,509-seat multi-purpose arena that is home to multiple Drexel University Dragons sports teams including basketball and wrestling. While the entire recreation center, including the multi-purpose arena, gym, natatorium, rock climbing wall, and squash canter are located in the athletic center, the "DAC" generally refers solely to the multi-purpose arena.

When originally opened in 1975 as the Physical Education Center, sometimes just referred to as the "New Gym", the facility included grandstands that sat a capacity of 1,800, and was expandable to 2,700 seats with temporary bleachers.

The athletic center was named for donor John Daskalakis in 2000. Daskalakis, a telecommunications executive and 1963 alum, played lacrosse while at Drexel. In January 2005, the basketball court was named Cozen Court after being dedicated to former Drexel men's basketball head coach Sam Cozen.

At the 2006 convocation Drexel University president Constantine Papadakis announced a 60,000-square-foot (5,600 m^{2}), three-story addition to the existing Daskalakis Athletic Center. The project, which expanded to an 84,000-square-foot (7,800 m^{2}) addition, broke ground in June 2008. Construction finished in December 2009 and parts of the building opened to students in January 2010. The Drexel Recreational Center officially opened in February 2010.

== Notable events ==
=== Basketball ===
The DAC hosted games in all or part of the 1993–1996 America East Conference men's basketball tournaments, the 2005 NIT Season Tip-Off, and the 2007 and 2012 National Invitation Tournament. In 2013, the DAC hosted four games of the 2013 Women's NIT, with the Dragons defeating Utah 46-43 in the final to win the tournament.

The DAC was built in 1974 as the Physical Education and Athletic Center (PEAC) and was renamed in 2001 after a gift from former Drexel Lacrosse player John A. Daskalakis ('63).

The Daskalakis Athletic Center hosted the 2018 and 2022 Colonial Athletic Association women's basketball tournament, and will again host the tournament in 2024.

In 2023, the DAC hosted The Basketball Tournament 2023 semifinals and championship. It also hosted The Basketball Tournament 2024 semifinals and championship.

=== Concerts ===
==== Dragonfly ====
After years of hosting annual concerts in Lot F at 31st and Chestnut Street, construction began at that site as part of the Schuylkill Yards project. As a result, the 2024 annual Drexel CAB concert, now branded as Dragonfly, relocated back to the Daskalakis Athletic Center.

- October 5, 2024: Tinashe, Slayyyter, Kari

==== Midnight Madness ====
The annual Midnight Madness event was held in the arena before the basketball season began. The event was similar to those at other universities, as it served as a pep rally for the entire men's and women's basketball seasons. During the event, the lineups for the teams were announced, and the annual DAC Pack T-shirt design was also released. Since 2011, a concert was also held as a closing to the event. The 2013 event which featured Childish Gambino held an attendance of over 2,200. In 2014 the event was replaced with the Drexel Fall Fest.

- 2013: Childish Gambino
- 2012: Dev and Chiddy Bang
- 2011: Chiddy Bang

==== Spring Jam ====
The annual Spring Jam concert, which is organized by the Drexel CAB, is generally held during the spring semester. The Spring Jam was performed at the DAC in 2006 before it was relocated to the Drexel Armory in 2007. Previously, the annual event was held in other areas including the Drexel Academic Quad, and Buckley Green. In 2011, it was relocated again to Lot F, an open parking area on Drexel's campus between Main Building and 31st Street. The headlining acts of the Spring Jam concerts performed at the Daskalakis Athletic Center have included:

- 2006: New Found Glory, My American Heart, Ernest Goodlife Band

==== Homecoming Concert ====
- January 23, 1997: Rusted Root, Geggy Tah

==== Fall Concert ====
Previous to the Drexel Campus Activities Board hosting the Spring Jam, their annual concert was in the Fall

- November 19, 1997: The Wallflowers
- 1996: No concert
- November 18, 1995: The Smithereens, Ocean Blue

==== Winter Concert ====
- February, 1978: The J. Geils Band, Kenn Kweder and The Secret Kids

==== Other Concerts ====
- May 3, 1993: 10,000 Maniacs, Zap Mama
- February 27, 1993: Velocity Girl, Low Road, Nasty Nas
- March 4, 1978: The J. Geils Band, Ken Kweder and the Secret Kidds

=== Squash ===
From 2011 through 2019, the annual US Open of Squash was held in the arena.

=== Table Tennis ===
In 2008, the DAC hosted the 2008 U.S. Olympic & National Table Tennis Team Trials. The event reached a capacity crowd of 2,000.

=== Tennis ===
The DAC hosted the World Team Tennis Championship match between the Philadelphia Freedoms and Springfield Lasers on August, 5th 2018.

== Arena Renovations ==
=== 2012–2016 ===
Over the span of multiple years, a staggered renovation took place in the main gym of the recreation center. The renovations took place during the basketball offseason each year (during Spring and Summer months) as to not interfere with the men's or women's basketball seasons.

==== 2012 ====
After a $3 million gift in support of Drexel athletics from John A. Daskalakis, renovations began in 2012 at the Daskalakis Athletic Center among other athletic facilities. The renovations completed in the first year of the upgrade were:

- Major renovation to the home locker room
- A Drexel athletics hall of fame display

==== 2013 ====
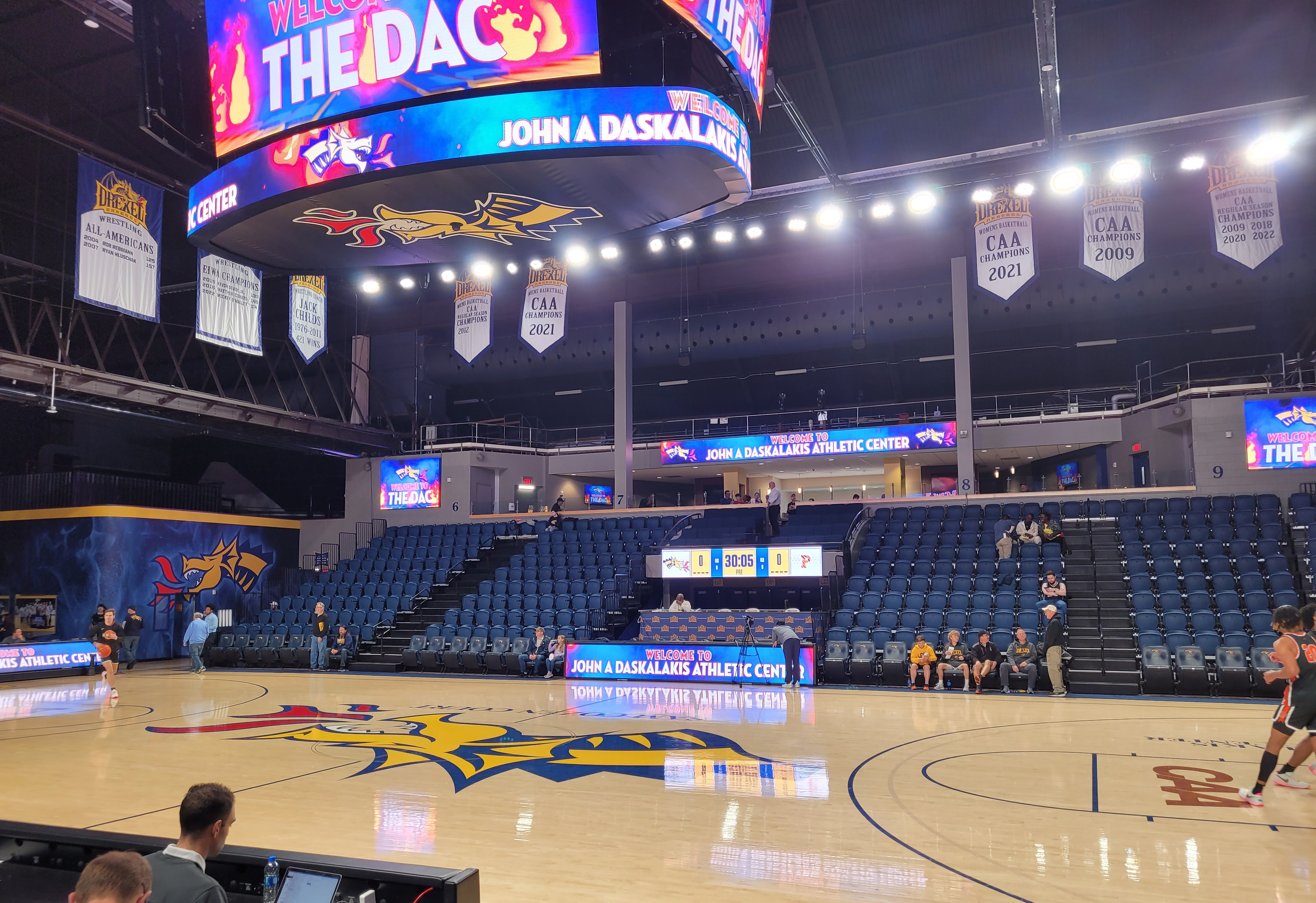
The renovated east side seating

In the Summer of 2013, more renovations continued in the main gym including:

- A large portion of the bleachers located on the West side of the gym were replaced with cushioned chair-back seating. This included VIP chair-back seating in the first row.
- A small number of additional bleacher seats was added in the Southwest corner

==== 2014 ====
In March 2014, more renovations totaling $7.7M were approved and include:

- Chair-back and VIP seating to replace the East bleachers, similar to the West bleacher renovation that occurred the previous offseason
- New South bleacher, 28 rows in height and approximately 1,000 seats, to hold the DAC Pack and pep band. (Previously, the DAC Pack was primarily located at the East bleachers)
- Several additional bathrooms, meeting space, a conference/reception area, and basket storage located in the Southwest corner behind the seating
- New visitor locker room, located in the Northwest corner

The addition of floor 'pro-style' baskets was also investigated by the design team. Following their investigation, a decision was made to not implement the floor baskets because they found that the South bleachers would have to be moved back nine feet further from the basketball court, and also that floor baskets generally cause an obstructed view for any fans seated behind the basket. Because of this, the DAC will continue to use its swing-down style baskets.

==== 2015 ====
Phase 4 of the Daskalakis Athletic Center renovation, completed in October 2015 included:

- New north-end seating, reducing the capacity to 2,509 from 2,532.
- Improved concessions

==== 2016 ====
Phases 5 and 6 of the renovation began in May 2016 and were completed in September 2016. Phase 5 of the renovation involved additions to the basketball court level and includes the addition of bathrooms, offices, ticket booth, conference room, storage rooms, and an audio/visual room for television broadcasts. Phase 6 included installing an air conditioning system in the arena.

=== 2022 ===
On May 31, 2022, Drexel announced that construction was underway to add an LED video scoreboard, sound system, LED lighting, and an upgraded video production studio to the arena.

== See also ==
- List of NCAA Division I basketball arenas
- 32nd St. and Lancaster Ave. Philadelphia Armory
