= 5th Street/Independence Hall station =

Rapid transit station in Philadelphia

5th St/Independence Hall
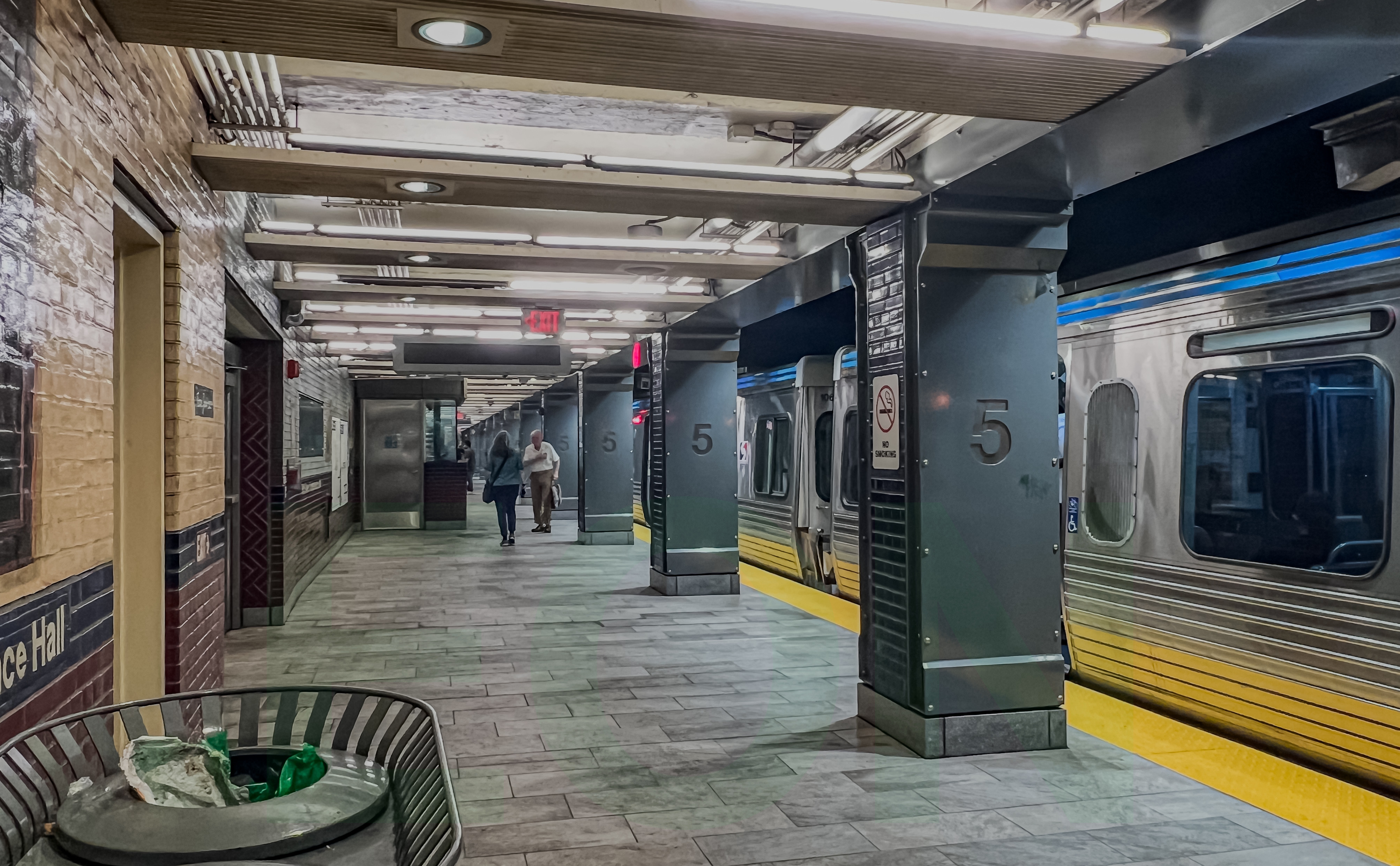
- 5th Street/Independence Hall station platform

General information
- Location: 5th and Market Streets; Philadelphia, Pennsylvania, U.S.
- Coordinates: 39°57′02″N 75°08′56″W
- Owner: City of Philadelphia
- Operator: SEPTA
- Platforms: 2 side platforms
- Tracks: 2
- Connections: SEPTA City Bus: 17, 33, 38, 44, 48

Construction
- Structure type: Underground
- Accessible: Yes

History
- Opened: August 3, 1908
- Former names: 5th Street (1908–2016)

Services
Preceding station	SEPTA Metro	Following station
8th–Market toward 69th Street T.C.	L (SEPTA Metro)	2nd Street toward Frankford T.C.
Location

5th Street/Independence Hall station is a subway station in Philadelphia, Pennsylvania, at the intersection of 5th and Market Streets, served by SEPTA Metro L trains. The station serves multiple notable Philadelphia landmarks, including Independence Hall, the Liberty Bell, the National Constitution Center, the National Museum of American Jewish History, and the Philadelphia Bourse.

The station originally opened as 5th Street station and was renamed by SEPTA on June 29, 2016.

The station is also served by numerous SEPTA bus routes, the 17, 33, 38, 44, and 48.

== History ==
=== 20th century ===
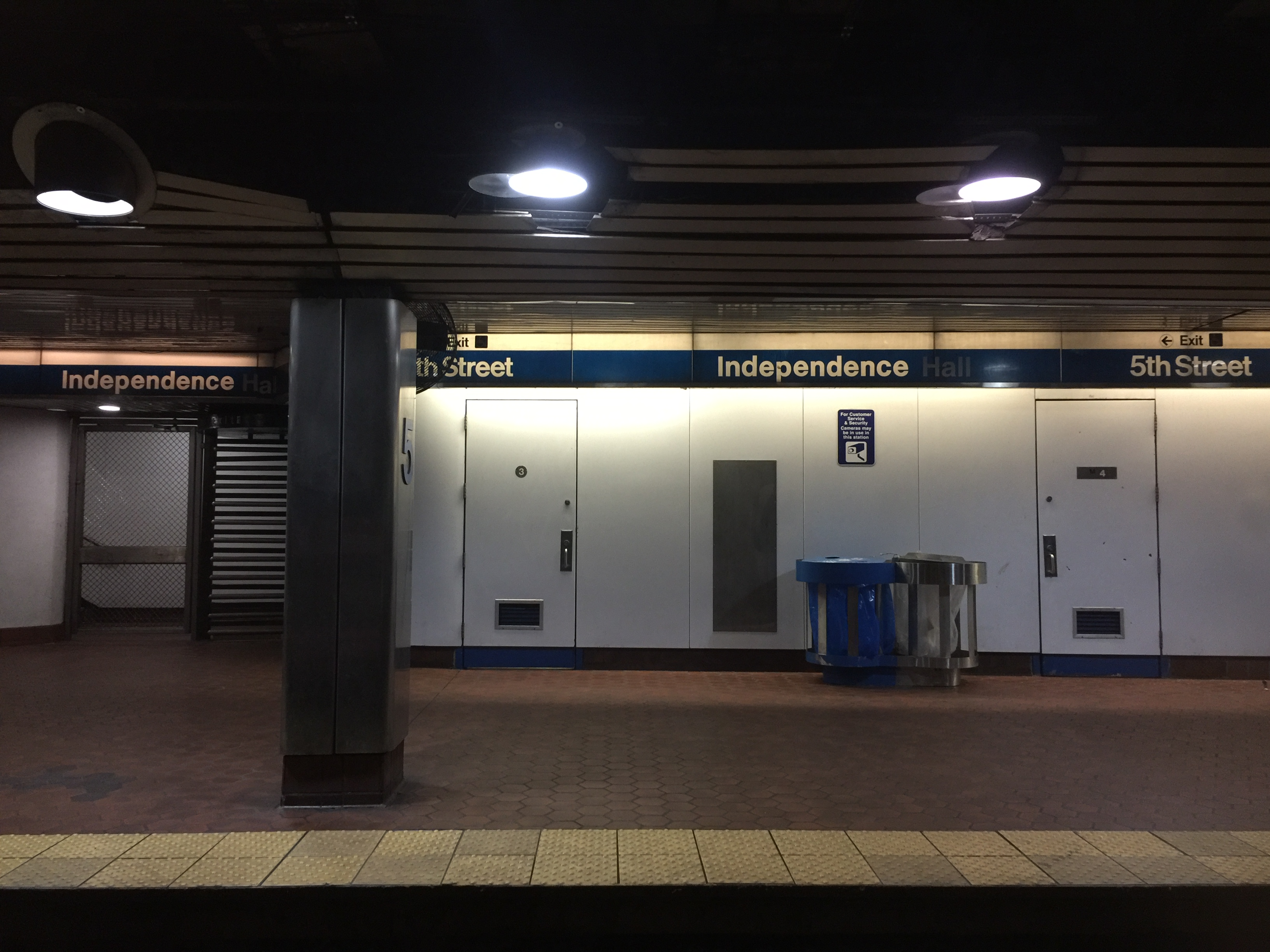
The station platform in 2018

The station opened August 3, 1908 as part of the first extension of the Philadelphia Rapid Transit Company's Market Street Subway. The line had originally opened a year earlier between 69th Street and 15th Street station.

The station was expanded in the 1950s along with the creation of the Independence Mall, and was last rehabilitated in 1974 in preparation for the United States Bicentennial. Elevators were installed in 2010, making the station accessible under the Americans with Disabilities Act.

=== 21st century ===
In July 2016, the city approved designs to rehabilitate the station, including new signage and lighting, rebuilt staircases and headhouses, as well as new artwork. The project began fall 2018 and it is scheduled for completion in fall 2020, coming in at an estimated total cost of $19.5 million. During the construction project, trains were bypassing the station.

== Station layout ==
The station has two side platforms with separate fare control on either side. 5th Street is the only station on the line in Center City that does not have a mezzanine crossover between the two platforms.

== Image gallery ==
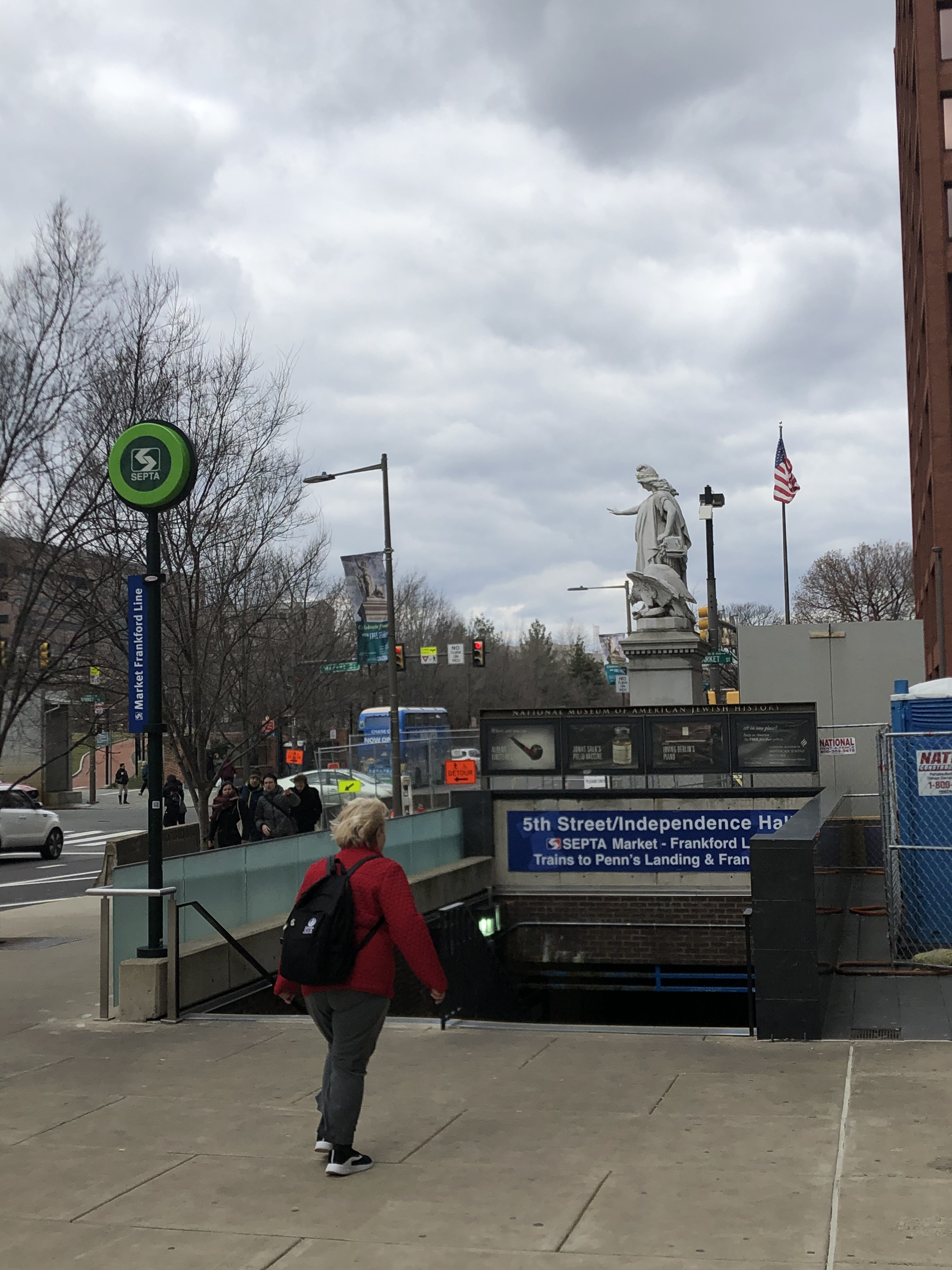
5th Street entrance

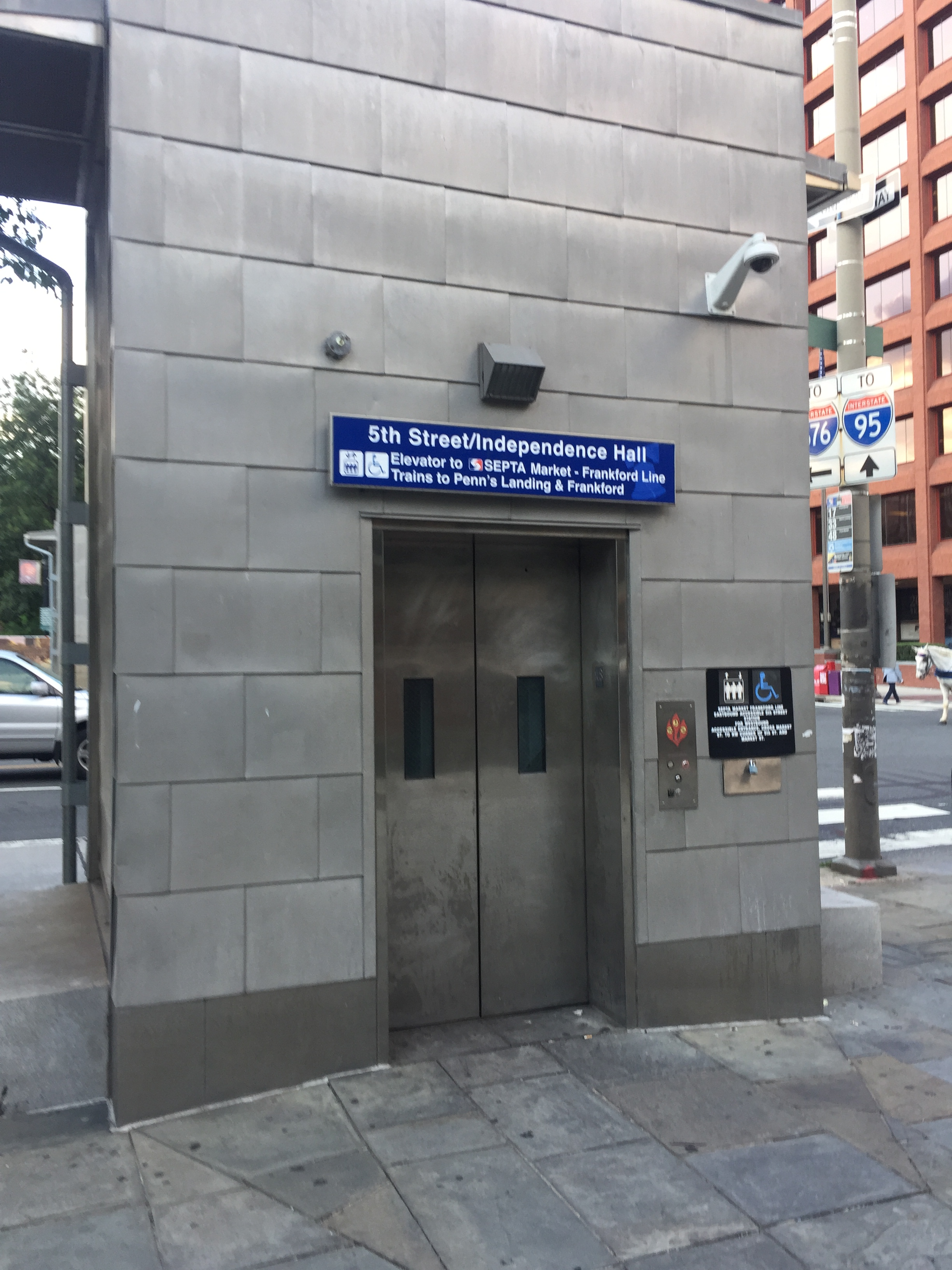
5th Street elevator

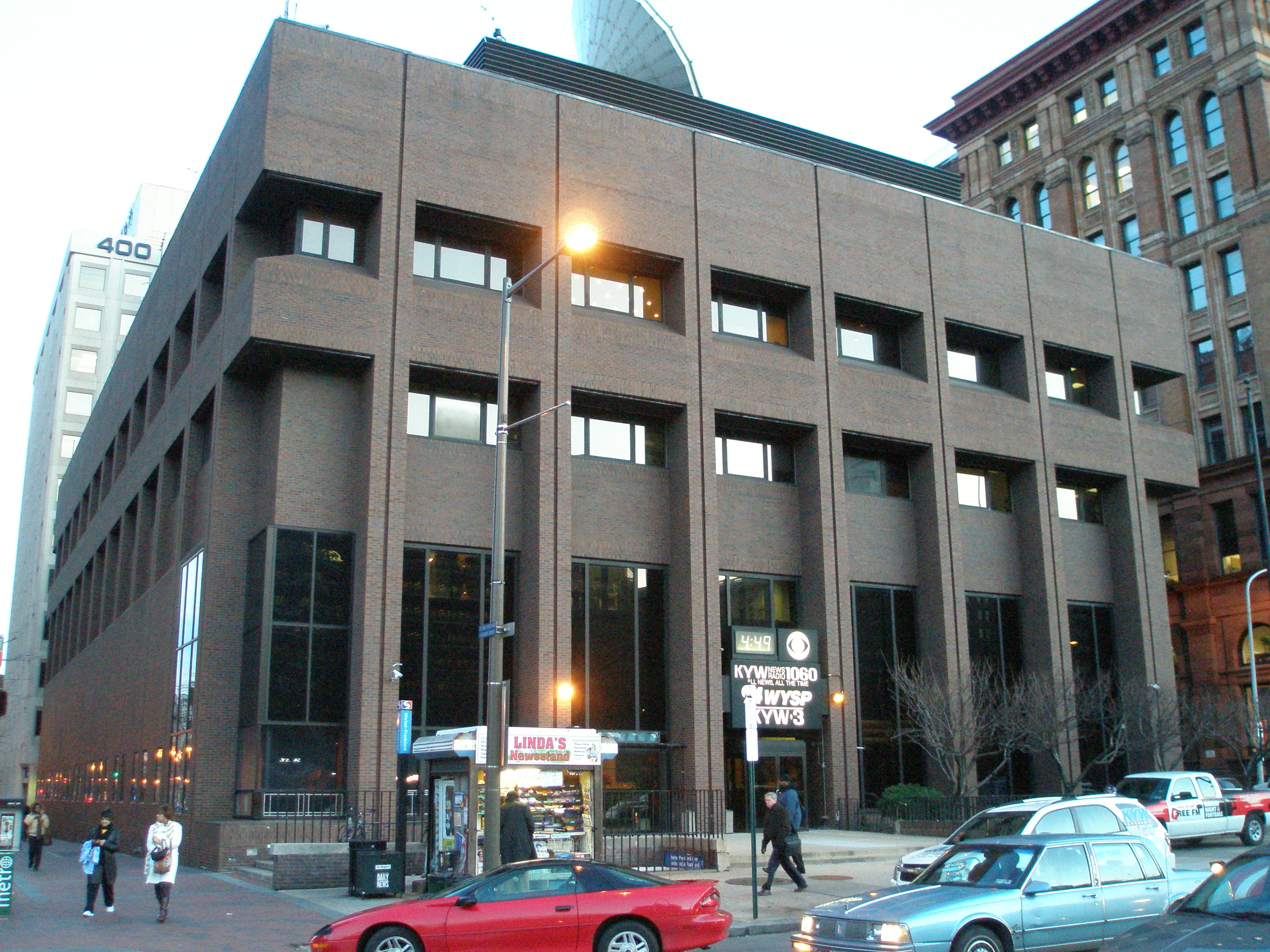
The now-demolished KYW AM Radio & TV building, with a subway entrance hidden in the foreground.
