= Spring Garden station (SEPTA Metro) =

Rapid transit station in Philadelphia

Spring Garden
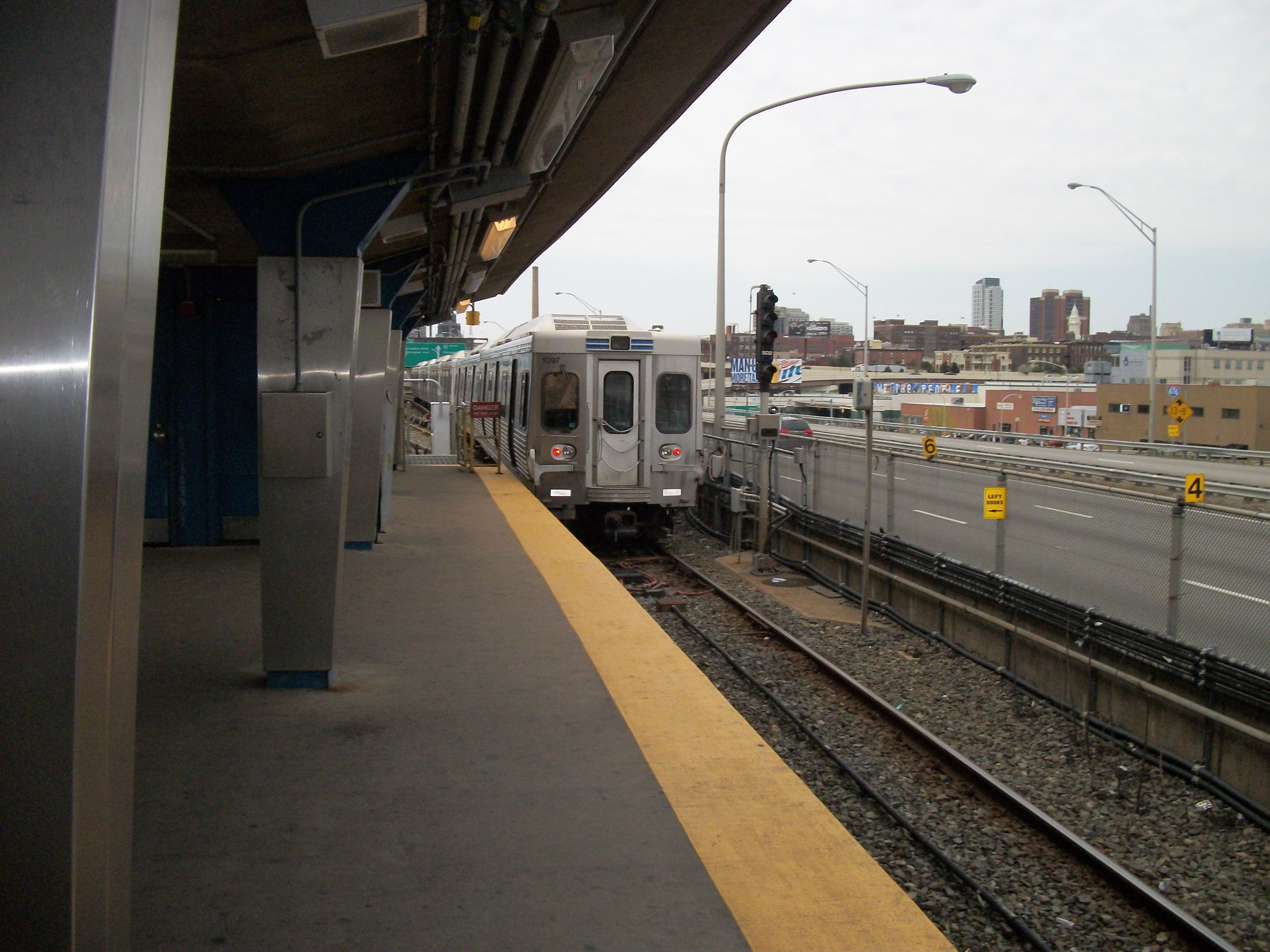
- Train leaves Spring Garden station

General information
- Location: 600 North Front Street; Philadelphia, Pennsylvania
- Coordinates: 39°57′38″N 75°08′25″W
- Owner: City of Philadelphia
- Operator: SEPTA
- Platforms: 1 island platform
- Tracks: 2
- Connections: SEPTA City Bus: 25, 43

Construction
- Structure type: Elevated
- Accessible: No, planned

History
- Opened: May 16, 1977

Services
| Preceding station | SEPTA Metro | Following station |
|---|---|---|
| 2nd Street toward 69th Street T.C. | L (SEPTA Metro) | Front–Girard toward Frankford T.C. |
Track layout
Location

Spring Garden station is a rapid transit station in Philadelphia, Pennsylvania, United States, serving SEPTA Metro L trains. It is located on Spring Garden Street between 2nd and Front streets in the Northern Liberties neighborhood. It is the westernmost station of the Frankford Elevated section of the line and the last westbound station before trains enter Center City Philadelphia.

Though the station's official address is on North Front Street, it is actually located in the median of the Delaware Expressway (Interstate 95) over Spring Garden Street, just north of the highway's interchange with the Vine Street Expressway (Interstate 676). The station is also served by two SEPTA City Bus routes, the 25 and 43.

== History ==
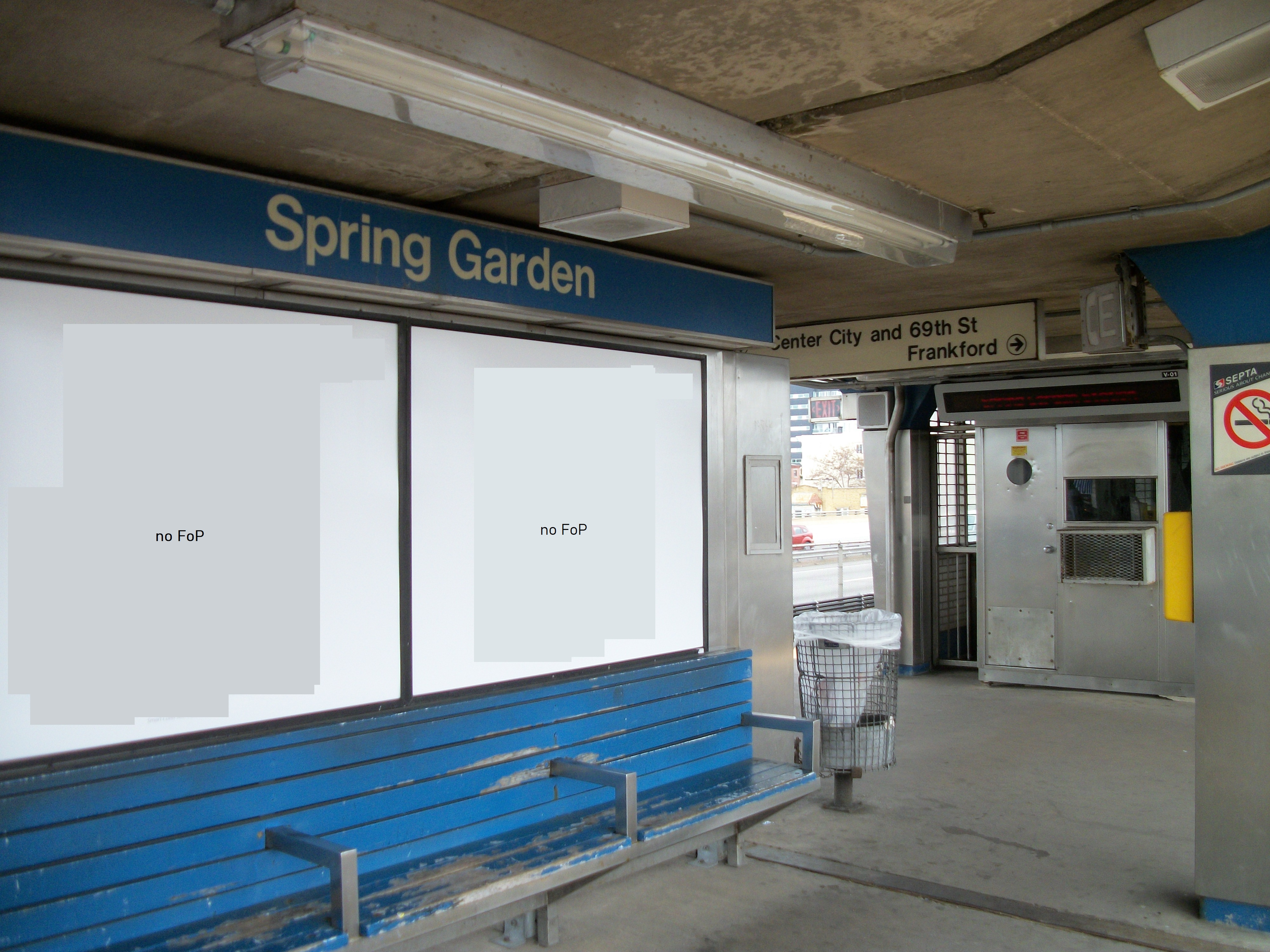
The platform at Spring Garden station

Spring Garden is one of the newest stations on the line. It opened in 1977 in conjunction with Interstate 95's routing through Philadelphia; about 1 mile (1.6 km) of the Market–Frankford Line tracks were realigned to the center median the highway. Spring Garden replaced the nearby Fairmount Avenue station, which was original to the Frankford Elevated that began serving trains in 1922. Fairmount Avenue was a "B" train skip-stop station, although that service pattern has since been discontinued.

Spring Garden is one of three stations on the Market–Frankford Line that is not ADA-accessible, the other two being 11th Street and 34th Street stations. The addition of elevators in the station was announced in SEPTA's 2021–2032 Capital Program proposal; the station platform would be rehabilitated and made accessible to passengers with disabilities by 2026 at an estimated cost of $7.37 million. The project also includes the renovation of the existing platforms as well as new signage, lighting, and security cameras.

== Station layout ==
The station has one island platform—unlike most Market-Frankford stations—with a single entrance/exit on the south side of Spring Garden Street. There is also an exit-only staircase that serves the north side of the street.

== Former intercity bus connections ==
Several intercity bus carriers, including Greyhound, FlixBus, Megabus, OurBus, and Peter Pan, provided service from designated loading zones located at Spring Garden Street and Christopher Columbus Boulevard, a short distance east of the station. Some designated loading zones are located beneath the station and the Interstate 95 bridge on Spring Garden. This stop was established in November 2023 following the relocation of intercity bus operations from 6th and Market Streets and before that at 10th and Filbert Streets. A designated loading zone was also established at Schuylkill Ave and Walnut Street just outside of 30th Street Station. Megabus service in Philadelphia ended on August 16, 2024 and Peter Pan absorbed those routes.

This arrangement ended on May 1, 2026, when intercity bus operations has relocated back to the former Greyhound terminal at 10th and Filbert Streets, which is redeveloped and operated by the Philadelphia Parking Authority.
