= Northeast 2nd Street station =

Railway station in Boca Raton, Florida

Northeast 2nd Street

General information
- Location: Northeast 2nd Street & Dixie Highway; Boca Raton, Florida
- Line: Florida East Coast Railway
- Tracks: 2

Proposed services
| Preceding station | Tri-Rail | Following station |
|---|---|---|
| Hillsboro Boulevard toward Fort Lauderdale | Green Line (proposed) | Atlantic Avenue toward Toney Penna |

Northeast 2nd Street is a proposed Tri-Rail Coastal Link Green Line station in Boca Raton, Florida. The station is slated for construction at the intersection of Dixie Highway and Northeast 2nd Street, just west of Federal Highway (US 1). Brightline has plans to offer service to the station.
