= Pompano Beach station =

Railway station in Pompano Beach, Florida

Pompano Beach

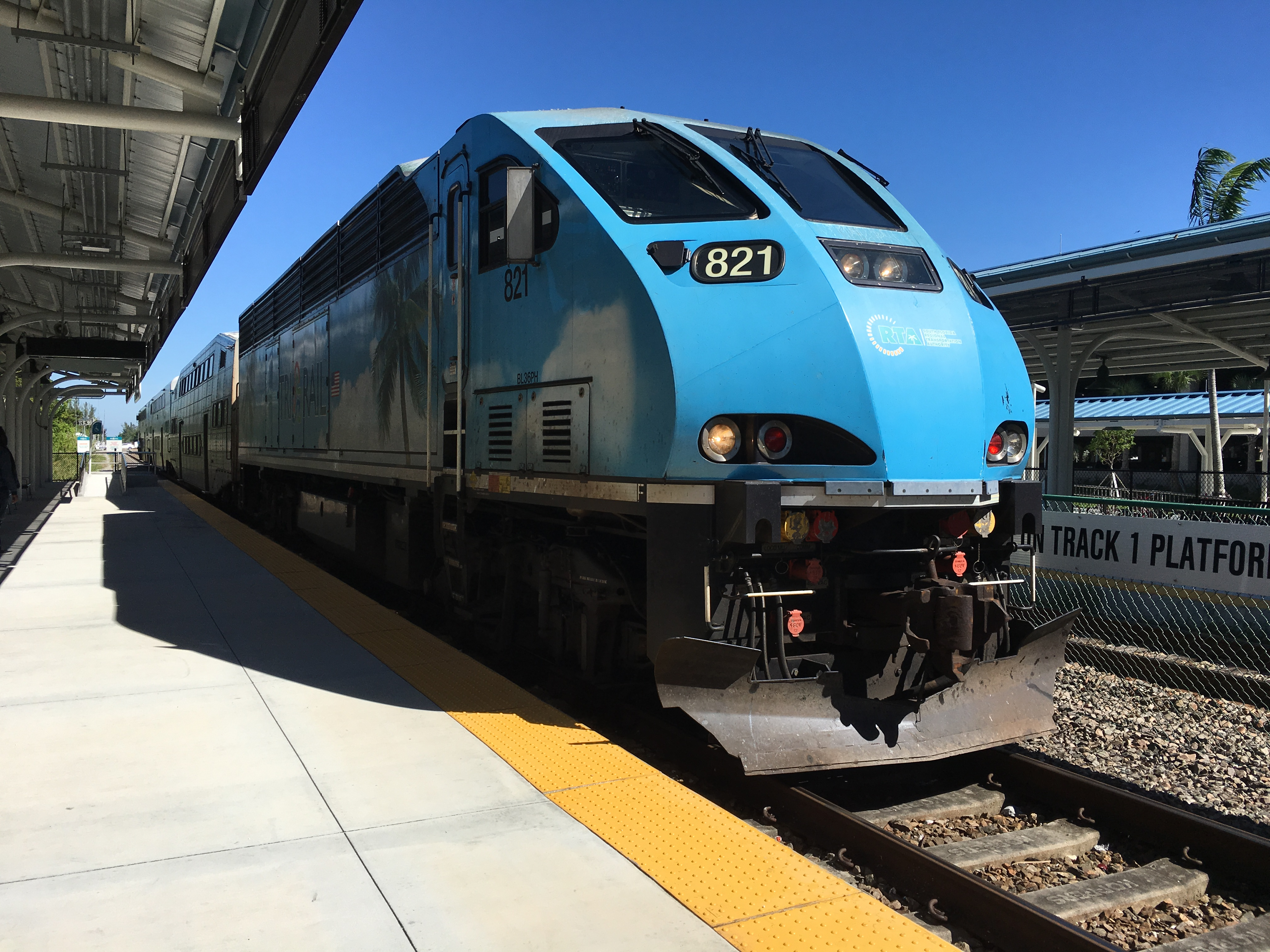
- Train waiting at the station

General information
- Location: 3491 Northwest Eighth Avenue; Pompano Beach, Florida
- Coordinates: 26.272452°N 80.134624°W
- Line: South Florida Rail Corridor
- Platforms: 2 side platforms
- Tracks: 2
- Connections: Broward County Transit: 34

Construction
- Parking: Yes
- Cycle facilities: Yes
- Accessible: Yes

Other information
- Fare zone: Boca Raton–Pompano Beach

History
- Opened: January 9, 1989

Services
| Preceding station | Tri-Rail | Following station |
|---|---|---|
| Cypress Creek toward Miami Airport | Main Line | Deerfield Beach toward Mangonia Park |
Express does not stop here
Former services
| Preceding station | Seaboard Air Line Railroad | Following station |
|---|---|---|
| Fort Lauderdale toward Tampa or Miami | Main Line | Deerfield Beach toward Richmond |
Future services
| Preceding station | Tri-Rail | Following station |
|---|---|---|
| Atlantic Boulevard toward Downtown Miami | Red Line (proposed) | Deerfield Beach toward Mangonia Park |
Location

Pompano Beach is a Tri-Rail commuter rail station in Pompano Beach, Florida, United States. With 109,000 passengers in the first six months of 2011, it is the tenth-busiest station on the Tri-Rail network. In 2015, the station had approximately 800 weekday riders.

== Description ==
The Pompano Beach station is located at Northwest Eighth Avenue and 35th Street, just southeast of the intersection of West Sample Road (SR 834) and Military Trail (SR 809). The station, officially opened to service January 9, 1989, offers parking. Pompano Beach was the last station not to be renovated to include better platform roofs, elevators and a pedestrian bridge over the tracks like most stations underwent during double tracking of the line, but was being rebuilt from 2015 to 2016.

=== Reconstruction ===
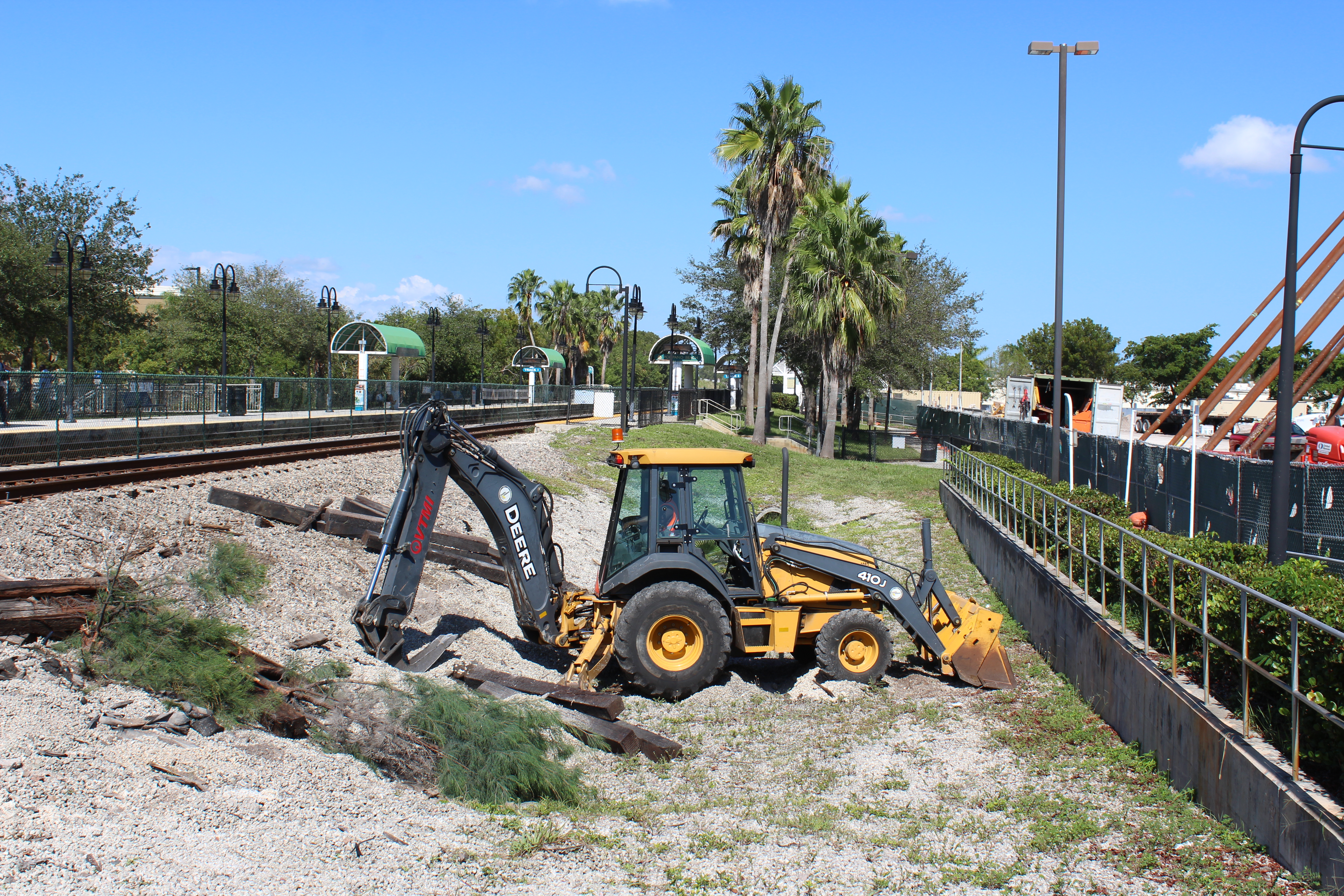
The station in November 2015; construction work on the parking garage and the SFRTA headquarters is visible at right

In 2011, Tri-Rail received a $5.7 million grant to renovate Pompano Beach as an environmentally sustainable station, collecting more than 100% of its energy demand through solar power, with the excess to be put on the grid. Construction was to have started in spring 2012 and finished by May 2013, but the project fell through.

In December 2014, Tri-Rail's governing board awarded a $40 million contract to Gulf Building to build a new headquarters, parking garage and station on the site of the Pompano Beach stop and on April 17, 2015, the South Florida Sun-Sentinel reported that groundbreaking was to take place later in the month. The upgrades were scheduled for completion in summer 2016. The renovation and construction of the 450-space garage caused a parking crunch at the station, where only 39 spots remained.

== Station layout ==
The station has two side platforms. A surface parking lot is located west of the southbound platform, while a parking garage and the SFRTA headquarters are east of the northbound platform.
