= 2nd Street station (SEPTA) =

Rapid transit station in Philadelphia

2nd St
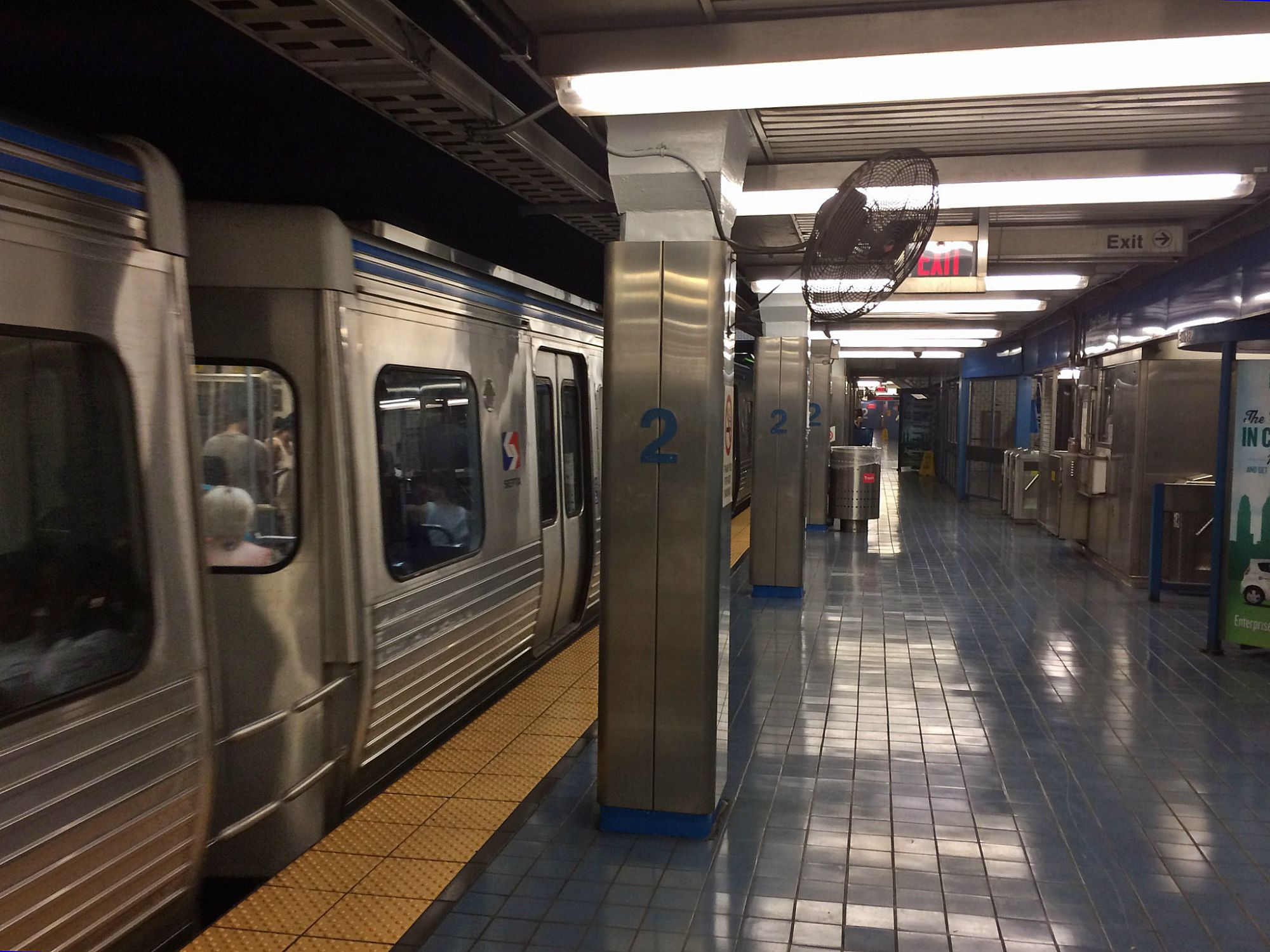

General information
- Location: 2nd and Market Streets; Philadelphia, Pennsylvania
- Coordinates: 39°56′59″N 75°08′37″W
- Owner: City of Philadelphia
- Operator: SEPTA
- Platforms: 2 side platforms
- Tracks: 2
- Connections: SEPTA City Bus: 5, 17, 21, 33, 42, 48

Construction
- Structure type: Underground
- Accessible: Yes

History
- Opened: August 3, 1908

Services
Preceding station	SEPTA Metro	Following station
5th Street/Independence Hall toward 69th Street T.C.	L (SEPTA Metro)	Spring Garden toward Frankford T.C.
Location

2nd Street station is a rapid transit station served by SEPTA Metro L trains in Philadelphia, Pennsylvania. The station is located beneath the intersection of 2nd Street and Market Street in Center City It is the easternmost stop in Center City and also the easternmost underground stop on the line.

The station serves the Old City neighborhood of Philadelphia, with station signs originally reading "Olde City". The 'e' has been covered on the signs with obvious blue stickers. The station also serves Penn's Landing and Spruce Street Harbor Park along the Delaware River.

2nd Street is also served by SEPTA bus routes 5, 17, 21, 33, 42, and 48.

== History ==
The station opened August 3, 1908 as part of the first extension of the Philadelphia Rapid Transit Company's Market Street Subway. The line had originally opened a year earlier between 69th Street and City Hall. The station was the eastern terminal of the line until September 7 of that year, when it was extended to the elevated Market–Chestnut station along the Delaware River. It was not until November 5, 1922, when trains were extended northeast along the current route of the Market–Frankford elevated.

On June 22, 2019, a passenger fell onto the tracks and was killed by an oncoming train.

== Station layout ==
The station has two side platforms. East of the station, the tracks turn north in a short tunnel between the northbound and southbound lanes of Interstate 95 before emerging from a portal just south of the Benjamin Franklin Bridge and then running on an embankment in the I-95 median through Spring Garden station. It then subsequently leaves the median and then proceeds on an elevated structure above Front Street, Kensington & Frankford Avenues towards Northeast Philadelphia.
