= Cypress Creek station =

Railway station in Fort Lauderdale, Florida

Cypress Creek

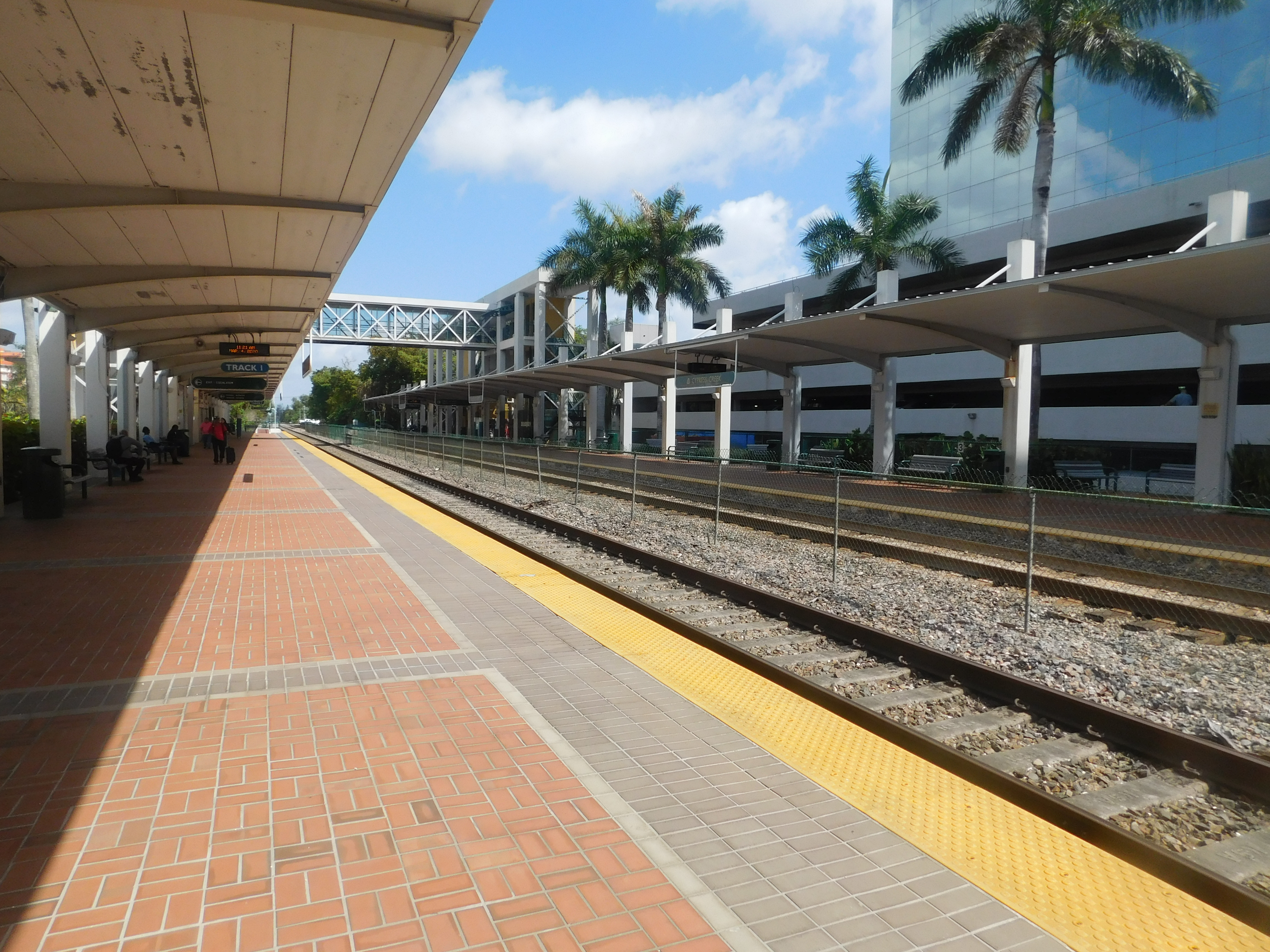
- Cypress Creek station from the southbound platform in March 2020.

General information
- Location: 6151 North Andrews Way; Fort Lauderdale, Florida
- Coordinates: 26°12′03″N 80°09′03″W
- Line: South Florida Rail Corridor
- Platforms: 2 side platforms
- Tracks: 2
- Connections: Broward County Transit: 14, 60, 62

Construction
- Parking: Yes
- Accessible: Yes

Other information
- Fare zone: Cypress Creek–Fort Lauderdale

History
- Opened: June 12, 1989

Services
Preceding station	Tri-Rail	Following station
Fort Lauderdale toward Miami Airport	Main Line	Pompano Beach toward Mangonia Park
Express does not stop here
Location

Cypress Creek station is a Tri-Rail commuter rail station in Fort Lauderdale, Florida. The station is located on North Andrews Way, west of North Andrews Avenue (SR 811) and Interstate 95 (I-95), and south of West Cypress Creek Road.

Originally opened to service June 12, 1989, the station features a park and ride lot along West Cypress Creek Road between North Andrews Avenue and I-95. Another parking lot is located across the tracks at a cul-de-sac named Northwest 59th Court.

== History ==
The station was originally scheduled to open on January 9, 1989, with the rest of the Tri-Rail system, but construction delays pushed its opening back a few months. Cypress Creek station opened on June 12, 1989.

== Station layout ==
The station has two side platforms, with parking and buses west of the southbound platform.
