= 34th Street station (SEPTA Metro) =

Rapid transit station in Philadelphia

34th St
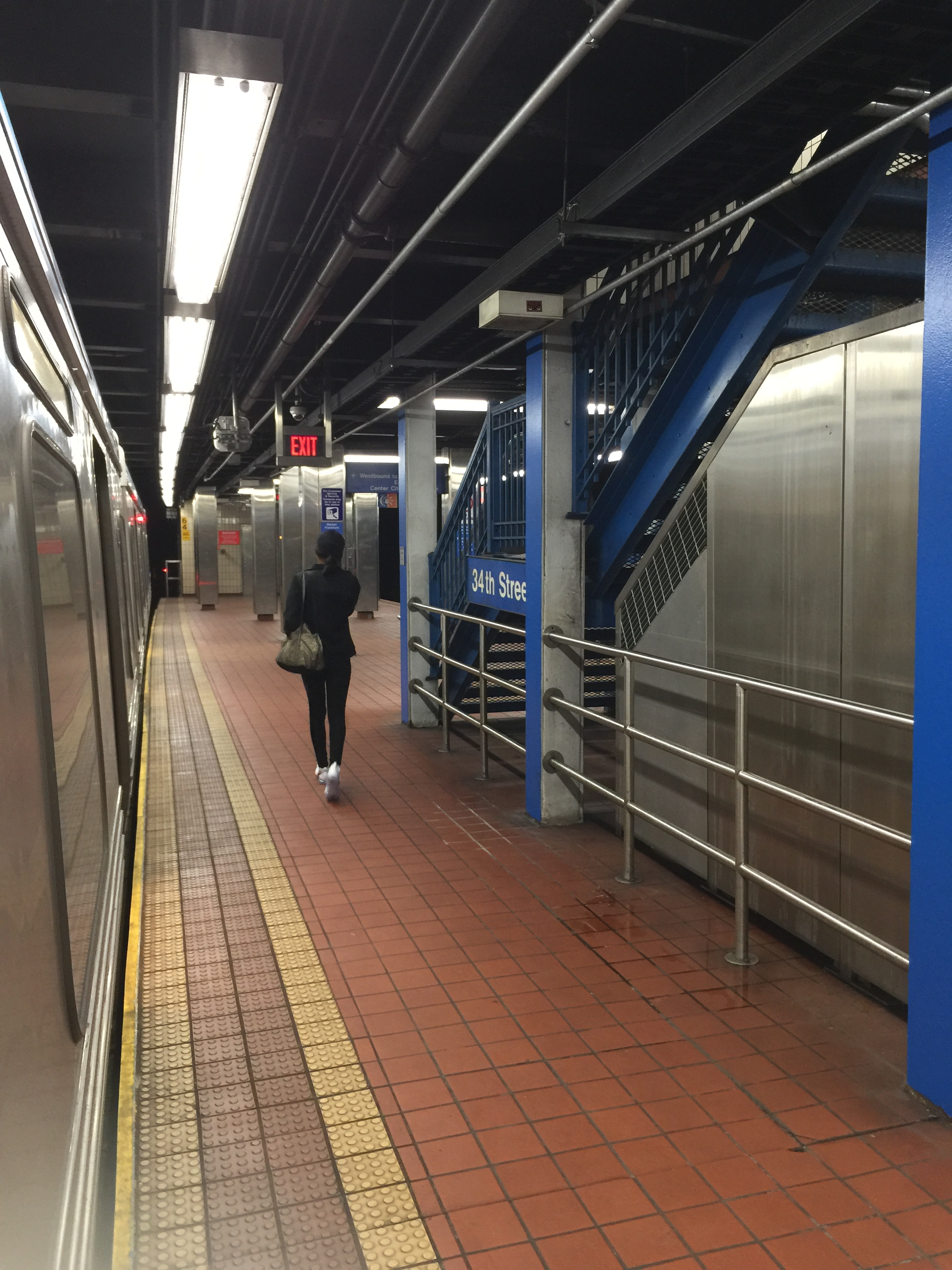
- 34th Street station platform

General information
- Location: 34th and Market Streets; Philadelphia, Pennsylvania
- Coordinates: 39°57′21″N 75°11′29″W
- Owner: SEPTA
- Platforms: 1 island platform
- Tracks: 2
- Connections: SEPTA City Bus: 30, 31, 49, LUCY

Construction
- Structure type: Underground
- Accessible: No, planned

History
- Opened: November 6, 1955

Services
Preceding station	SEPTA Metro	Following station
40th Street toward 69th Street T.C.	L (SEPTA Metro)	Drexel Station at 30th Street toward Frankford T.C.
Former services
Preceding station	Philadelphia Transportation Company	Following station
40th Street toward 69th Street	Market Elevated	30th Street toward Frankford
Location

34th Street station is an underground station on the SEPTA Metro L, located at the intersection of 34th Street and Market Street in Philadelphia, Pennsylvania, in the University City neighborhood of West Philadelphia. The station is on the Drexel University campus, adjacent to the Daskalakis Athletic Center, and near the University of Pennsylvania campus and the University City Science Center.

The station is also served by SEPTA bus routes 30, 31, 49, and LUCY.

== History ==
34th Street station was opened on November 6, 1955 by the Philadelphia Transportation Company, built to replace the elevated station that opened in 1907 as part of the Philadelphia Rapid Transit Company's original Market Street subway–elevated line from 69th Street to 15th Street, which was elevated west of 23rd Street.

The PRT announced a project to bury the elevated tracks between 23rd and 46th streets in the 1920s. The tunnel from 23rd to 32nd streets was completed by 1933, but construction on the remaining segment was put on hiatus due to the Great Depression and World War II. The PRT went bankrupt in 1939 and was reorganized as the PTC, which began building the rest of the tunnel in 1947.

34th Street is one of three stations on the Market–Frankford Line that is not ADA-accessible, the other two being 11th Street and Spring Garden stations. The addition of elevators in the station was announced in SEPTA's 2021–2032 Capital Program proposal; the station platforms would be rehabilitated and made accessible to passengers with disabilities by 2030 at an estimated cost of $30 million. In 2022, SEPTA revised the project's budget to $31 million and estimated design would by complete by 2024 and the construction would be completed by fall 2028. The project now also includes the renovation of the existing platforms, new signage, lighting, and security cameras, as well as waterproofing improvements.

== Station layout ==
Unlike most underground Market–Frankford Line stations, 34th Street has a single island platform.
