= East Hundred (band) =

East Hundred is a female-fronted indie rock band from Philadelphia, Pennsylvania.

== History ==
East Hundred was formed in 2004 as a recording project with brothers Brooke and Will Blair and Brooke's then-girlfriend Beril Guceri. They released their first self-titled EP in late spring of 2005. Soon after, they invited bassist Dave Sunderland and keyboardist Susan Gager to join the live act. The trio continued to write and record and in February 2007 they released Copper Street Performer produced by John McEntire. In April 2008, the now five-piece began recording what would become their first full-length album Passenger with Brian McTear of Miner Street Studios. During this time the band experienced inner turmoil as Blair and Guceri ended their relationship. This in turn fueled a surge of material and Passenger was completed and self-released in January 2009. The group continued to tour and write throughout 2010 and recorded a five-song EP in early 2011 at The Studio in Philadelphia, PA. The Spells EP was released in June 2011.

In a post on the band's homepage entitled 'Spring 2012', East Hundred posted: 'With heavy hearts, we'd like to invite you to East Hundred's final farewell show to help us show appreciation for everyone who has supported us and guided us through this musical venture which we've mutually decided is now ending.' There was no specific reason why the band was ending its musical career, only that the farewell show would be at Johnny Brenda's (http://www.johnnybrendas.com/event/113485/) on May 6.

== In popular culture ==
East Hundred is a registered VH1/ MTV artist. "Plus Minus" has been featured in MTV's The City and VH1's Secrets of Aspen. "Slow Burning Crimes" has been featured on MTV's 16 and Pregnant.

Songs "Slow Burning Crimes" and "Afterlove" have been featured on the Showtime reality program The Real L Word

The song "Slow Burning Crimes" was featured in the Disney film Prom 2011

The song "Afterlove" was featured in the television trailer for The Company Men 2011

In July 2009 East Hundred was named Philadelphia's WXPN "Artist to Watch" Disney

East Hundred's music was used in the 2017 film Mustang Island, starring Brooke and Will Blair's brother, Macon Blair.

== Members ==
- Beril Guceri - vocals
- Brooke Blair - guitar
- Will Blair - drums
- Dave Sunderland - bass
- Susan Gager - keys

== Discography ==
- Self-Titled EP (self-released 2007)
- Copper Street Performer EP (self-released 2007)
- Passenger full-length (self-released 2009)
- The Spells EP (self-released 2011)
