= Toney Penna station =

Proposed Station in Jupiter Florida

Toney Penna

General information
- Location: Toney Penna Drive & Dixie Highway; Jupiter, Florida
- Line: Florida East Coast Railway
- Tracks: 1

Proposed services
Preceding station	Tri-Rail	Following station
PGA Boulevard toward Fort Lauderdale	Green Line (proposed)	Terminus
Location

Toney Penna is a proposed Tri-Rail Coastal Link Green Line station in Jupiter, Florida. The station is planned for construction west of Dixie Highway (Broward–Palm Beach) (Florida State Road 811) between Toney Penna Drive and Jupiter Lakes Boulevard. It would be the northernmost station in the tri-county system, very near the Martin County line, and would only have one track.
