= Palm Springs, Florida =

- Village
- Village of Palm Springs
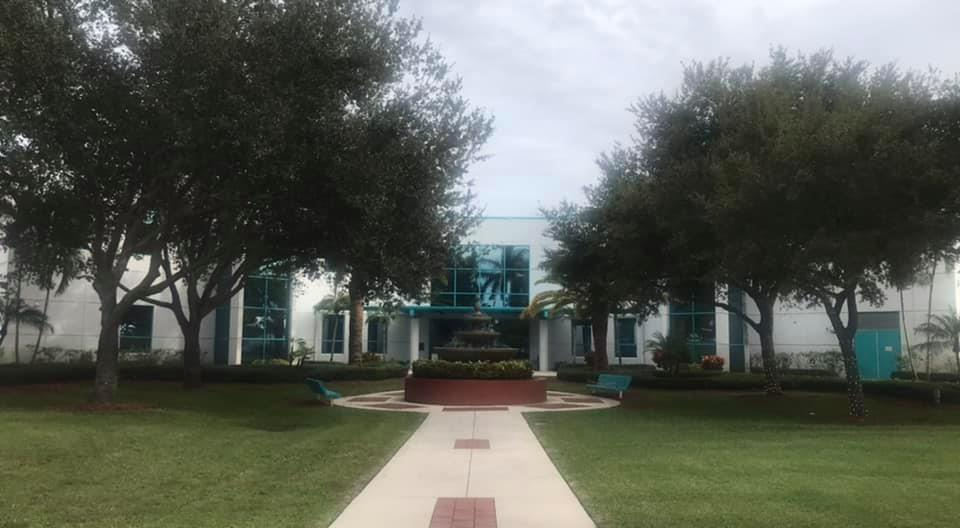
- Palm Springs Village Hall

- Seal
- Motto: "Garden Spot of Palm Beach County"
- Location of Palm Springs, Florida
- Coordinates: 26°37′39″N 80°05′51″W
- Country: United States
- State: Florida
- County: Palm Beach
- Incorporated: May 31, 1957

Government
  - Type: Council-Manager

Area
  - Total: 4.25 sq mi (11.02 km^{2})
  - Land: 4.21 sq mi (10.90 km^{2})
  - Water: 0.046 sq mi (0.12 km^{2})
- Elevation: 13 ft (4.0 m)

Population (2020)
  - Total: 26,890
  - Density: 6,391.4/sq mi (2,467.75/km^{2})
- Time zone: UTC−05:00 (Eastern (EST))
  - Summer (DST): UTC−04:00 (EDT)
- ZIP Codes: 33406, 33415, 33461
- Area codes: 561, 728
- FIPS code: 12-54450
- GNIS feature ID: 2407517
- Website: www.vpsfl.org

Palm Springs is a village in Palm Beach County, Florida, United States, situated approximately 61 mi (98 km) north of Miami. The village's name was likely derived from the resort city of Palm Springs, California. Located in the east-central part of the county, Palm Springs is situated north of Atlantis, east of Greenacres, west of Lake Clarke Shores and Lake Worth Beach, and southwest of West Palm Beach. The 2010 United States census recorded the village's population at 18,928, which increased to 26,890 in the 2020 census. Palm Springs is also located within the Miami metropolitan area of South Florida, which had a population of approximately 6,138,333 people as of 2020.

William A. Boutwell operated a dairy farm on 5 acres (2.0 ha) of land in modern-day Palm Springs beginning in 1927, which expanded to about 700 acres (280 ha) prior to his retirement in 1956. One year later, the Florida Legislature approved a charter establishing the village of Palm Springs as Palm Beach County's 30th municipality on May 31, 1957. At the time of incorporation, the village consisted only of farmland, a dairy barn, and no permanent residents. Within two years, around 800 homes had been built, and four schools were constructed in or near Palm Springs between 1959 and 1970. The first village hall was erected in 1960.

Palm Springs has been expanding through annexation since 1998, more than doubling the village's land area and population within a few decades. Also around that time, the village government began planning for a new municipal complex, which opened in the mid-2000s. By 2010, Palm Springs became the first municipality in Palm Beach County in which a majority of its residents are of Hispanic or Latino ancestry. The village is also the home of the Fulton-Holland Educational Services Center, the headquarters of the School District of Palm Beach County.

== History ==
Residents of Lake Worth (now the city of Lake Worth Beach) proposed to town commissioners in May 1922 that a municipal country club and golf course be constructed to attract winter tourists. According to The Lake Worth Herald, the facility would be located west of the town at "Section 19, Township 44 South, Range 43 East", an area that is now part of Palm Springs. However, a referendum held in the following month rejected the proposal by a narrow margin. Instead, Lake Worth's municipal golf course opened along the Intracoastal Waterway in November 1926. Commissioners nonetheless approved an ordinance that month to annex 1,800 acres (730 ha) of land west of the city's boundaries, extending as far as 660 ft (200 m) west of Military Trail; this included parts of modern-day Palm Springs.

In 1927, then-Lake Worth vice mayor William A. Boutwell, who moved to the area from Massachusetts earlier in the 1920s and owned a grocery store and masonry supply company in the city, began dairy farming on 5 acres (2.0 ha) of land in modern-day Palm Springs – in addition to the farmland he owned in Lake Worth. Over time, his dairy farm expanded to occupy approximately 700 acres (280 ha), while the Boutwell Dairy herd increased to more than 1,000 Guernsey cattle in the vicinity of Congress Avenue and Forest Hill Boulevard (then named Selby Road) at its peak, becoming one of the largest dairy farms in Florida. Additionally, William A. Boutwell invented half-and-half creamer in Lake Worth. He retired in 1956, while his family sold the remaining farmland and livestock by 1965.

By 1957, Moore Associates Development Group of Miami created a plan to develop a new community west of Lake Worth on the land formerly used by the Boutwell dairy farm, at a townsite consisting of about 700 acres (280 ha) of farmland and only one structure, a large dairy barn. Consequently, Florida House of Representatives member Ralph Blank Jr. of Palm Beach County introduced legislation that same year to establish the village of Palm Springs. The bill passed unanimously and Palm Springs was chartered on May 31, 1957. The village was likely named after the resort city of Palm Springs, California. Moore Associates Development Group founder James E. Moore became the first mayor of Palm Springs, while other first officeholders included tax collector Bernard Jaffe, town counsel Rome Amari, and village council members Robert Levinson, William R. Moore, Buck Wentz, and Sid Zwirn.

To transform the pastures into land suitable for development, work crews shifted millions of tons of muck and sand to enhance both drainage and landscape appearances. Another early project was the creation of a water and sewage system, which cost approximately $1.5 million. By August 1958, about 800 homes had been built. Rapid population growth necessitated the construction of four schools in and near Palm Springs between 1959 and 1970, beginning with Palm Springs Elementary School in September 1959. Palm Springs was a 1959 recipient of the Florida Illustrated Magazine's community builders award. In the first few years of its existence, the village government functioned in the remodeled dairy barn, located at 153 Henthorne Drive, briefly sharing the building with Christ Community Church. However, construction soon began on a nearly 8,000 sq ft (740 m^{2}) village hall, which opened in February 1960. The 1960 census, the first conducted since the establishment of Palm Springs, recorded a population of 2,503 people. A 1962 profile in The Palm Beach Post reported that the village had 38 paved roads, while about 1,300 building permits had been approved over the past five years.

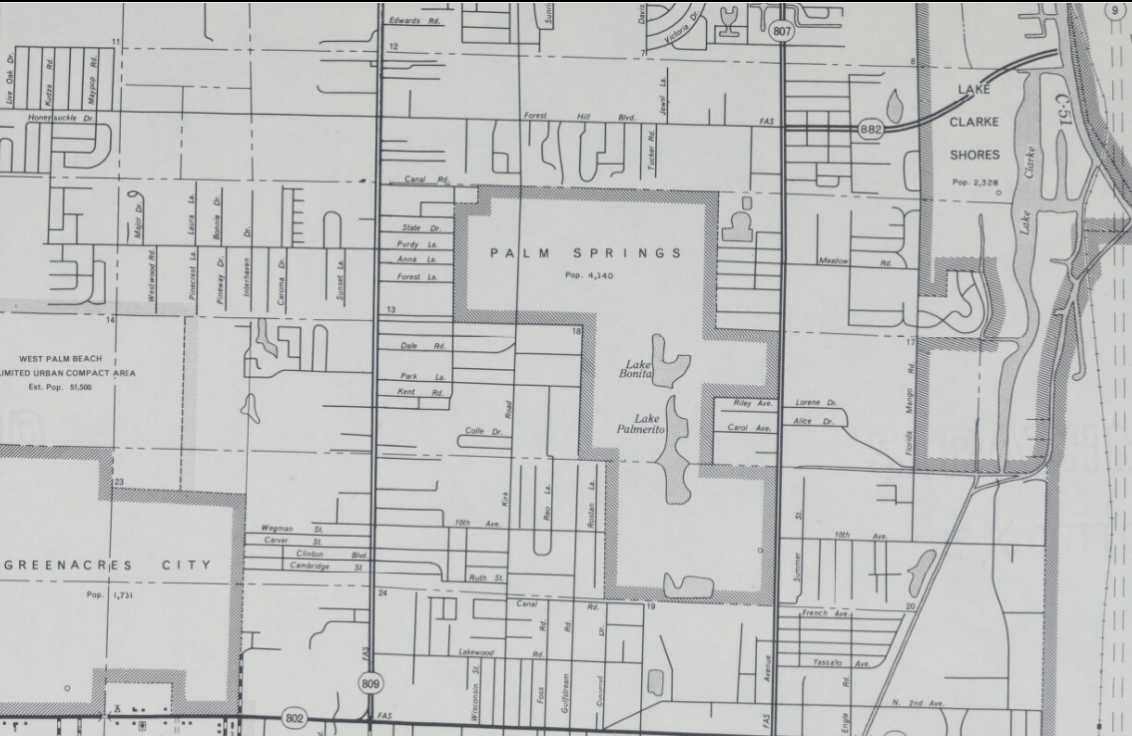
1968 boundaries of Palm Springs

The population of the village increased significantly in the 1970s, nearly doubling from 4,340 in the 1970 census to 8,166 in the 1980 census. On November 11, 1978, the Jeanette J. Guerty Palm Springs Library opened. Originally 6,000 sq ft (560 m^{2}) in size, the building has since been enlarged, first in the mid-1980s. The village's original boundaries remained mostly unchanged for about four decades. However, in 1997, the village council adopted a plan for expanding Palm Springs. Under the plan, future annexation included all areas west to Military Trail from its boundaries at the time, between Lake Worth Road and north of Forest Hill Boulevard; and all areas east of the present boundaries to Florida Mango Road. The annexation plan was expected to increase the population of Palm Springs by another 10,000 residents, roughly twice the population in 1997. Also in the late 1990s, the village council began planning to renovate the original municipal complex after residents approved a bond referendum in 1999.

Consequently, a new village hall opened in July 2003 – a two-story, 24,000 sq ft (2,200 m^{2}) structure, approximately thrice as large as the original village hall. Thereafter, the newly expanded library and public safety building opened in 2004 and 2005, respectively. Also in 2005, Hurricane Wilma destroyed 5 homes and damaged 2,462 others to some extent in Palm Springs, including substantial impact to 460 multi-family residences, more than in any other municipality in Palm Beach County. However, damage from Wilma totaled only $6.1 million, including $3 million to businesses, $2.5 million to residences, and $600,000 to government properties. In 2007, Palm Springs observed its 50th anniversary of incorporation alongside Independence Day celebrations. Beginning with the 2010 census, a majority of residents of the village identified as Hispanic or Latino.

The 96-unit Lakewood apartment community was built of Lego-style blocks designed by RENCO USA and created from recycled glass and plastic, resins and limestone.

== Geography ==
Palm Springs is located in east-central Palm Beach County. The village is situated adjacent to Greenacres, Lake Clarke Shores, Lake Worth Beach, and West Palm Beach. Palm Springs has been expanding by annexation since 1998. The United States Census Bureau reported in 2000 that Palm Springs had a total area of 1.65 square miles (4.3 km^{2}), of which 1.6 square miles (4.1 km^{2}) was land and 0.05 square miles (0.13 km^{2}) was water. As of 2020, the village has a total area of 4.25 square miles (11.0 km^{2}), of which 4.21 square miles (10.9 km^{2}) is land and 0.05 square miles (0.13 km^{2}) is water.

The original village townsite includes a chain of artificial north-to-south oriented lakes linked to canals, engineered in 1957 as a mechanism to promote drainage. Geologically, Palm Springs is located within the Anastasia Formation region, which dominates far eastern Palm Beach County. This type of geological formation is composed primarily of coquina, sand, and sandy limestone.

=== Climate ===
Palm Springs has a tropical climate, similar to the climate found in much of the Caribbean. It is part of the only region in the 48 contiguous states that falls under that category. More specifically, it generally has a tropical rainforest climate (Köppen climate classification: Af), bordering a tropical monsoon climate (Köppen climate classification: Am).

== Demographics ==
Historical population
Census	Pop.	Note	%±
1960	2,503		—
1970	4,340		73.4%
1980	8,166		88.2%
1990	9,763		19.6%
2000	11,699		19.8%
2010	18,928		61.8%
2020	26,890		42.1%
U.S. Decennial Census

=== Racial and ethnic composition ===
Palm Springs racial composition (Hispanics excluded from racial categories) (NH = Non-Hispanic)
Race	Pop 2010	Pop 2020	% 2010	% 2020
White (NH)	6,698	5,916	35.39%	22.00%
Black or African American (NH)	1,987	3,567	10.50%	13.27%
Native American or Alaska Native (NH)	23	43	0.12%	0.16%
Asian (NH)	314	461	1.66%	1.71%
Pacific Islander or Native Hawaiian (NH)	4	16	0.02%	0.06%
Some other race (NH)	42	165	0.22%	0.61%
Two or more races/Multiracial (NH)	275	523	1.45%	1.94%
Hispanic or Latino (any race)	9,585	16,199	50.64%	60.24%
Total	18,928	26,890		

=== 2020 census ===
As of the 2020 census, Palm Springs had a population of 26,890. The median age was 36.3 years. 23.6% of residents were under the age of 18 and 12.9% were 65 years of age or older. For every 100 females, there were 96.5 males, and for every 100 females age 18 and over, there were 93.1 males.

100.0% of residents lived in urban areas, while 0.0% lived in rural areas.

There were 9,818 households in Palm Springs, of which 37.4% had children under the age of 18 living in them. Of all households, 38.0% were married-couple households, 20.6% were households with a male householder and no spouse or partner present, and 30.7% were households with a female householder and no spouse or partner present. About 25.4% of all households were made up of individuals and 10.9% had someone living alone who was 65 years of age or older.

There were 10,864 housing units, of which 9.6% were vacant. The homeowner vacancy rate was 1.7% and the rental vacancy rate was 6.6%.

The 2020 American Community Survey estimated that 5,664 families resided in the village.

Palm Springs was the fastest growing municipality in Palm Beach County between 2010 and 2020, with its population increasing by around 42% during that period. The censuses in the aforementioned years also indicated that Palm Springs is the only municipality in the county with a Hispanic majority.

=== 2010 census ===
As of the 2010 United States census, there were 18,928 people, 6,889 households, and 4,150 families residing in the village.

In 2010, in the village, the age distribution was 12.7% at 65 or older, 23.7% was under 18, 9.7% from 18 to 24, 29.6% from 25 to 44, and 24.3% from 45 to 64; the median age was 36.2 years. For every 100 males, there were 107 females. For every 100 males age 18 and over, there were 112.3 females. Around 28.8% of the households in 2010 had children under the age of 18 living with them, 15.2% were married couples living together, 18.0% had a female householder with no spouse present, and 35.6% were not families. About 27.9% of all households were made up of one individual, and 25.8% had someone living alone who was 65 years of age or older. The average household size was 2.58, and the average family size was 3.13.

=== 2000 census ===
As of the census of 2000, there were 11,699 people, 5,148 households, and 2,970 families residing in the Palm Springs, Florida. The population density was 2,805.6 people/km^{2} (7,266 people/mi^{2}). There were 5,919 housing units at an average density of 1,419.5 units/km^{2} (3,676 units/mi^{2}). The racial makeup was 84.24% White (65.6% were Non-Hispanic White), 6.68% African American, 0.33% Native American, 1.38% Asian, 0.03% Pacific Islander, 4.76% from other races, and 2.58% from two or more races. Hispanic or Latino of any race were 25.04% of the population.

In 2000, the age distribution of the population was spread out in 2000, with 21.6% under the age of 18, 8.1% from 18 to 24, 32.9% from 25 to 44, 20.6% from 45 to 64, and 16.8% who were 65 years of age or older. The median age was 37.0 years. For every 100 females, there were 89.3 males. For every 100 females age 18 and over, there were 85.5 males. In 2000, 26.7% had children under the age of 18 living with them, 39.7% were married couples living together, 13.5% had a female householder with no spouse present, and 42.3% were non-families. Approximately 33.7% of all households were made up of one individual, and 13.9% had someone living alone who was 65 years of age or older. The average household size was 2.27 and the average family size was 2.90.

In 2000, the median income for a household in the village was $36,026, and the median income for a family was $42,430. Males had a median income of $30,920 versus $26,106 for females. The per capita income for the village was $18,763. About 4.9% of families and 7.9% of the population were below the poverty line, including 7.2% of those under age 18 and 8.9% of those age 65 or over.

As of 2000, speakers of English as a first language accounted for 69.9% of all residents, while Spanish accounted for 24.1%, French Creole made up 2.0%, Italian was at 1.1%, German speakers were at 0.9%, French was spoken by 0.8%, Portuguese was at 0.6%, Polish at 0.4%, and Tagalog was a mother tongue for 0.3% of the population.

As of 2000, Palm Springs had the fifty-first-highest percentage of Cuban residents in the US, with 7.6% of the village's populace. It also had the fifty-second-highest percentage of Haitian residents, which was 2.9% (tied with four other areas, including Opa-locka), and the eighty-first-highest concentration of Colombian residents, which made up 1.9% of the population (tied with West Miami.)

== Government ==
Palm Springs uses the council–manager form of government. The village council is composed of five elected officials, a mayor and four members. Of the four other persons on the village council, one serves as vice mayor and another as mayor pro tempore. Currently, the mayor of Palm Springs is Beverly "Bev" Smith. Twice a month, the village council meets in the village hall at 226 Cypress Lane. They are elected on a non-partisan basis for two-year terms. The terms for mayor and members of the village council are staggered and elections are held in odd-numbered years. These elections occur on the first Tuesday in March, followed by a runoff on the fourth Tuesday of March if a no candidate receives a majority of the vote. Other Palm Springs government officials include Village Manager Michael Bornstein, Village Attorney Glen Torcivia, and Village Clerk Kimberly M. Wynn.

Palm Springs is part of Florida's 21st congressional district, which has been represented by Lois Frankel (D) since 2017. The town at the state level is part of the 87th district of the Florida House of Representatives, which covers a large portion of east-central Palm Beach County. Currently, the district is represented by David Silvers (D). The village is within the Florida Senate's 31st district, which includes much of east-central and southeast Palm Beach County and is currently represented by Lori Berman (D). Nearly of all of Palm Springs is within the 3rd district for the Palm Beach County Board of County Commissioners, represented by Dave Kerner, while the small section of the village along Congress Avenue to the north of Forest Hill Boulevard is part of the 2nd district, represented by Gregg K. Weiss.

== Economy ==
In 2020, Palm Springs had a workforce of 12,225 people, while approximately 1,188 residents were unemployed in March of that year, constituting a slightly higher unemployment rate than in surrounding communities. Although 55.1% of residents of the village worked within 10 miles (16 km) of home, only 8.5% of residents worked in Palm Springs as of 2018. The other top workplace destinations for residents of Palm Springs included West Palm Beach (13.4%), Boynton Beach (3.9%), Lake Worth Beach (3.7%), Boca Raton (3.5%), and Riviera Beach (3.1%). Of those employed in Palm Springs but living elsewhere, the most common home destinations included West Palm Beach (7.5%), Wellington (approximately 5%), Boynton Beach (just under 5%), Greenacres (approximately 4%), and Royal Palm Beach (3.5%). The largest employers in Palm Springs are the cosmetic manufacturer Oxygen Development and the Fulton Holland Educational Services Center, the headquarters of the School District of Palm Beach County. The largest industries in Palm Springs in terms of the number of employees were construction, health care and social assistance, and retail trade.

In order to promote economic development, the Palm Springs Community Redevelopment Agency (CRA) classified two commercial sections of the village for future capital projects. One of those sections is the Congress Avenue Subdistrict, which comprises 291 acres (118 ha) and includes larger businesses such as the Defy trampoline park, Fulton-Holland Educational Services Center, Off-Lease Only car dealership, Oxygen Development, and YMCA of the Palm Beaches. The other CRA section, the 221 acres (89 hectares) Lake Worth Road Subdistrict, includes businesses such as a Home Depot store and the Lake Worth Swap Shop and Drive In. The village also has several other shopping plazas outside these districts, among the largest are the Palm Springs Shopping Center, located at 10th Avenue North and Congress Avenue, and the Greenwood Shopping Center, located farther north along Congress Avenue, anchored by a Publix store.

== Education ==
Palm Springs is served by the School District of Palm Beach County; the district has its headquarters in the Fulton-Holland Educational Services Center in Palm Springs. Three public schools are located within the boundaries of Palm Springs – Palm Springs Elementary School, Palm Springs Community Middle School (formerly named Jefferson Davis Junior High School), and Clifford O. Taylor/Kirklane Elementary – while several schools in surrounding areas serve the village's public school students. Public grade school students are assigned to Berkshire Elementary School in unincorporated West Palm Beach, Clifford O. Taylor/Kirklane Elementary School, or Meadow Park Elementary School in unincorporated West Palm Beach. Public middle school students attend Conniston Community Middle School in West Palm Beach, Lake Worth Middle School in Lake Worth Beach, L. C. Swain Middle School in Greenacres, or Palm Springs Community Middle School. High school students living north of the L-8 canal or east of Congress Avenue attend Forest Hill Community High School in West Palm Beach, while all others are assigned to John I. Leonard Community High School in Greenacres. St. Luke's Catholic School, a private religious school, is located in Palm Springs. The village has two charter high schools: the Palm Beach Preparatory Charter Academy and G-Star School of the Arts.

There are no colleges or universities in Palm Springs. However, the main campus of Palm Beach State College in unincorporated Lake Worth Beach is located near the village's southern periphery. West Palm Beach also has a few public and private higher education institutes, including Keiser University and Palm Beach Atlantic University.

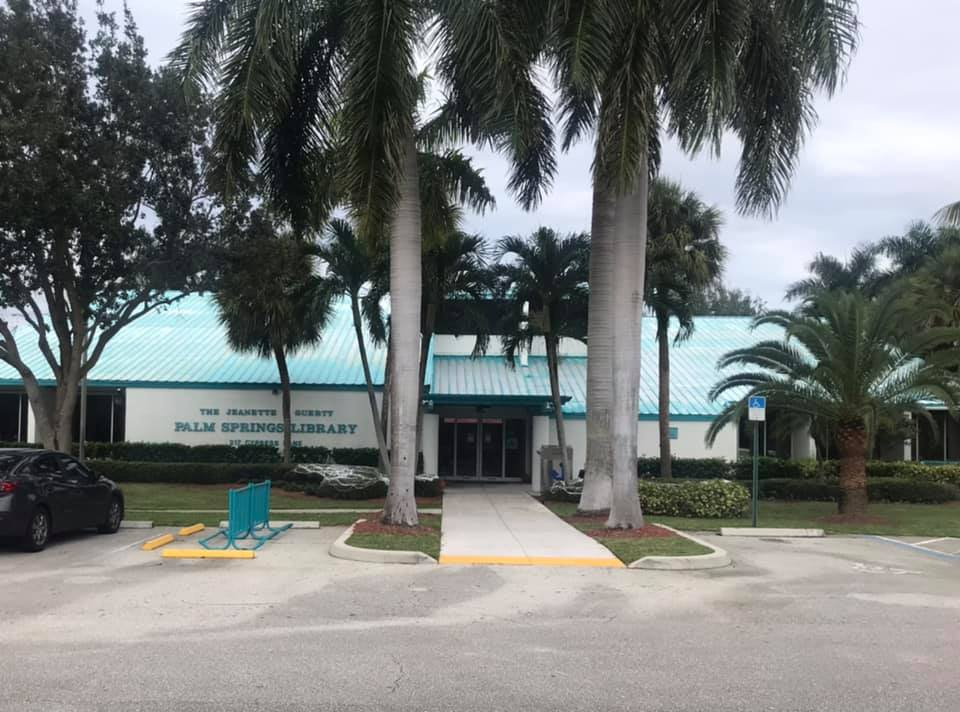
Palm Springs Public Library

== Palm Springs Public Library ==
The Palm Springs Public Library is located in the village government complex. As of November 2021, a total of 91,643 items are circulated by the library, including 48,071 volumes. The library began in the 1960s as a collection of books acquired via donations and then cataloged and shelved in a room in the old village hall. After the accumulating collection outgrew the room, the materials were transferred to a double-wide trailer. In the early 1970s, Jeanette J. Guerty was elected to the village council and lobbied for the construction of a library building, using funds from a capital improvements bond issue approved in 1976. Due to her death in September 1978, the library was officially named the Jeanette J. Guerty Palm Springs Library when it opened on November 11, 1978. Initially a 6,000 sq ft (560 m^{2}) building, the library has been expanded multiple times, including in the mid-1980s and mid-2000s. In 1978, Janeen Campanero became the first appointed library director for the Palm Spring Public Library. She was the first professional librarian to hold that position. The current director of the Palm Spring Public Library is Jossie Maliska.

== Recreation and culture ==
Palm Springs contains eight municipal parks, while John Prince Memorial Park is located just outside of the village's southeastern boundaries. The Village Center Complex includes several outdoor recreational facilities for baseball, basketball, miniature golf, tennis, and volleyball, as well as a park and water splashpad. Additionally, the Parks and Recreation Department hosts youth baseball, basketball, flag football, and soccer at the Village Center Complex.

=== Historic preservation ===
The only structure in the original townsite pre-dating the establishment of Palm Springs in 1957, a dairy barn on William A. Boutwell's farm, remains standing at 153 Henthorne Drive. However, the building underwent extensive renovations that year to become Christ Community Church, which also briefly served as the first village government center, and is currently known as Comunidad De Fe, a Spanish-speaking Reformed church. Palm Springs opened its first permanent village hall in February 1960, although that building was demolished in 2003, shortly after the completion of the current village hall. Since at least 2001, the Lake Worth Pioneers Association (LWPA) has been based in Palm Springs. Organized in 1894 and officially established in 1897, the LWPA is a historical society that has compiled biographies, stories, and photographs of people who settled in the Lake Worth Lagoon region during the 19th century. The organization also hosts events for the descendants of these pioneers, including an annual picnic at the Norton Museum of Art in West Palm Beach.

== Media ==
The Lake Worth Herald and Coastal/Greenacres Observer, a weekly newspaper based in Lake Worth Beach, publishes stories about local news in Palm Springs. Residents of the village are also served by The Palm Beach Post, which is published in West Palm Beach. The Palm Beach Post had the 5th largest circulation for a newspaper in Florida as of November 2017 and is served to subscribers throughout Palm Beach County and the Treasure Coast. The village of Palm Springs also publishes a monthly newsletter detailing upcoming activities and events.

Palm Springs is part of the West Palm Beach–Fort Pierce television market, ranked as the 38th largest in the United States by Nielsen Media Research. The market is served by stations affiliated with major American networks including WPTV-TV/5 (NBC), WPEC/12 (CBS), WPBF/25 (ABC), WFLX/29 (FOX), WTVX/34 (CW), WXEL-TV/42 (PBS), WTCN-CD/43 (MYTV), WWHB-CD/48 (Azteca), WHDT/59 (Court TV), WFGC/61 (CTN), WPXP-TV/67 (ION), as well as local channel WBWP-LD/57 (Ind.).

Many radio stations are located within range of the village. Radio station WWRF, an AM Regional Mexican station, is based in Palm Springs.

== Infrastructure ==
=== Transportation ===
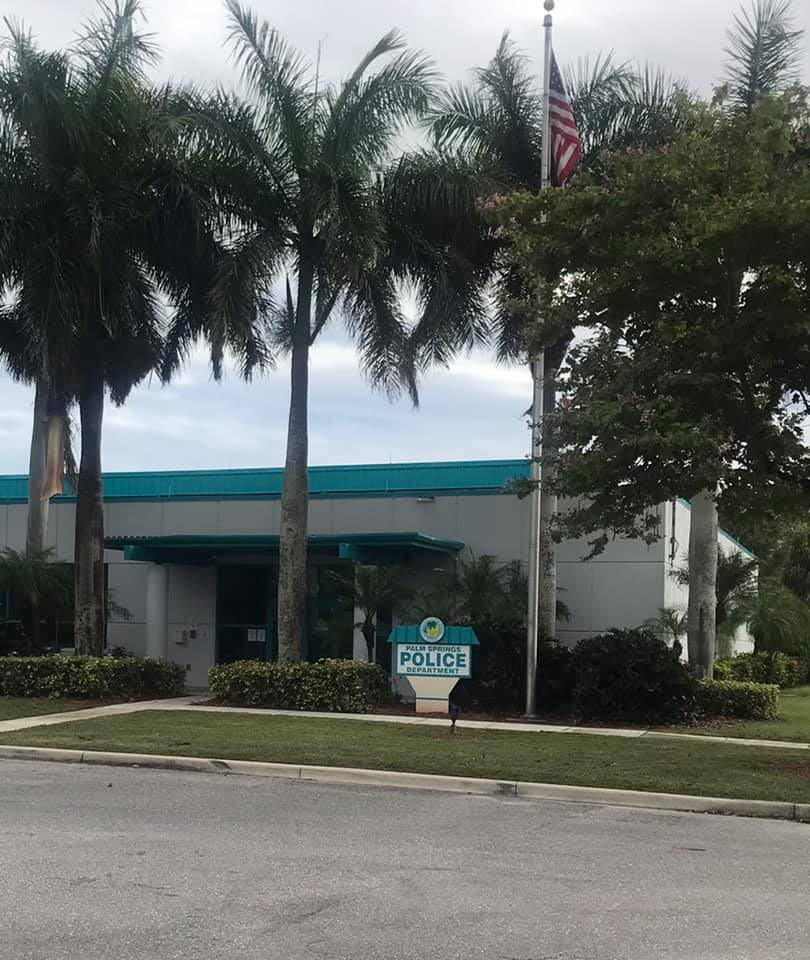
Palm Springs Police Department

State Road 802 (locally known as Lake Worth Road) passes east–west near the southern end of the village. Congress Avenue (designated as State Road 807) is a north–south oriented road close to the eastern boundary of Palm Springs. The far western edges of Palm Springs border Military Trail (designated as State Road 809). State Road 882 (locally known as Forest Hill Boulevard) moves west–east near the village's northern boundary. Two entrance and exit ramps for Interstate 95 are located along Forest Hill Boulevard and 10th Avenue North, just outside the village limits. A few Palm Tran routes serve Palm Springs, including Route 2 on Congress Avenue, Route 46 on Forest Hill Boulevard, Route 60 along Purdy Lane and then northward on Kirk Road, Route 61 on 10th Avenue North, and Route 62 on Lake Worth Road.

=== Emergency services ===
Palm Springs operates a municipal police department, with the headquarters building located at the village complex. The Palm Springs Police Department employs 59 full-time members, including 42 who are sworn officers and 15 others who serve as civilian employees. There are also part-time auxiliary officers and a volunteer staff. Thomas Ceccarelli serves as police chief.

The village originally had its own firefighting unit, which acquired their first fire truck in the fall of 1959. The unit was a volunteer force with 18 members, who also served as auxiliary law enforcement officers and members of the village's civil defense unit. Today, Palm Beach County Fire Rescue (PBCFR) is responsible for firefighting services in Palm Springs. PBCFR operates stations number 31 and 39 in the village, with the former located on 2nd Avenue N and latter being located adjacent to the police department.

=== Utilities ===
Two electrical providers serve Palm Springs, Florida Power & Light (FPL) and the city of Lake Worth Beach. The split in service between two providers stems from an agreement between the village and Lake Worth Beach back in August 1957. As of December 31, 2019, FPL serves approximately 5 million customers throughout Florida, equivalent to about 10 million people. Much of the electricity supplied by FPL is sourced from natural gas, followed by nuclear energy. The nearest FPL power plant is in Riviera Beach, while the closest nuclear power station is the St. Lucie Nuclear Power Plant, on Hutchinson Island. Lake Worth Beach Electric Utility, based in nearby Lake Worth Beach, serves approximately 7,200 customers in Palm Springs and unincorporated Palm Beach County as of August 2019. The company has been providing electricity through nuclear and solar energy increasingly since 2017, accounting for more than 38% of power generated by Lake Worth Beach Electric Utility as of May 2021.

Since its founding in 1957, Palm Springs has had its own water utility service, with the water treatment plant originally constructed and owned by the F&F Construction Company. The village government purchased the water plant from the F&F Construction Company in 1966 and later implemented significant improvements to it in 1976 and 1978. Today, the plant includes nine water supply wells and the water has been treated regularly since February 1999.

Waste Pro is responsible for collecting solid waste in Palm Springs, through a contractual agreement with the village government. Bulk trash, yard trash, and recycling are collected once per week, while garbage is collected twice per week.
