= Chief White Owl =

American professional wrestler

Personal information
- Born: George Dahmer; 19 June 1935 Wilmington, Ohio, U.S.
- Died: 23 May 2008 (aged 72) Atlantis, Florida
- Spouse: Patricia Dillon (m. 1958)
- Children: 2
- Family: Pancho Villa (brother)

Professional wrestling career
- Ring name(s): Chief White Owl; Chief Big Eagle; George White Owl; George Dahmer
- Billed height: 5 ft 10 in (1.78 m)
- Billed weight: 230 lb (100 kg)
- Billed from: Cherokee Indian Reservation, North Carolina
- Trained by: Buddy Rogers; Frankie Talaber
- Debut: 1956
- Retired: 1983

George Arnold "Hootie" Dahmer (June 19, 1935 – May 23, 2008) was an American professional wrestler, better known by the ring name Chief White Owl.

== Career ==
Dahmer began wrestling in his native Ohio during the 1950s and 1960s. He wrestled for the World Wide Wrestling Federation, notably teaming with Wahoo McDaniel. During the 1970s, he began appearing for the National Wrestling Federation, holding the NWF World Tag Team Championship with Luis Martinez.

Dahmer died at the JFK Medical Center in Atlantis, Florida on May 23, 2008. Following his death, his family filed a wrongful death lawsuit against the nursing home caring for him, resulting in the family being rewarded $2 million.

== Championships and accomplishments ==
- National Wrestling Federation
  - NWF World Tag Team Championship (3 times) – Luis Martinez (1), Jim Powers (1) and Wahoo McDaniel (1)
- World Classic Professional Big Time Wrestling
  - Ohio Pro Wrestling Hall of Fame (Class of 2020)
