= Congress Avenue (Florida) =

Road in Palm Beach County, Florida, US

Congress Avenue
- State Road 807 and County Road 807
- CR 807 in blue, SR 807 in red, municipal segment in grey

Route information
- Maintained by FDOT, Palm Beach E&PW, and the cities of West Palm Beach, Riviera Beach, and Palm Beach Gardens
- Length: 28.9 mi (46.5 km) 4.809 mi (7.74 km) as SR 807; 20.4 mi (32.83 km) as CR 807

Major junctions
- South end: SR 794 in Boca Raton
- I-95 in Boca Raton; SR 806 in Delray Beach; SR 804 in Boynton Beach; SR 802 in Palm Springs; SR 882 in Palm Springs; US 98 / SR 80 in Glen Ridge; SR 704 in West Palm Beach; SR 710 in Riviera Beach; SR 708 in Riviera Beach
- North end: CR 809A in Palm Beach Gardens

Location
- Country: United States
- State: Florida
- County: Palm Beach

Highway system
- Florida State Highway System; Interstate; US; State; Former; Pre‑1945; Toll; Scenic
| ← SR 806 | → SR 808 |

Congress Avenue is a 28.9-mile (46.51 km) long north–south arterial road serving central Palm Beach County, Florida. A 4.8-mile (7.72 km) section from Palm Springs to President Donald J. Trump International Airport encompasses Florida State Road 807 (SR 807), while the remaining southern section is officially known––but seldom referred to––as County Road 807 (CR 807). In addition, a segment north of the airport exists without state or county designation.

Congress Avenue, like the paralleling Military Trail and Jog Road, is a popular commuting alternative to often-congested Interstate 95, Florida's Turnpike, and U.S. Route 1 in Palm Beach County.

== Route description ==
=== County Road 807 ===
Congress Avenue and CR 807 begin at the intersection with Yamato Road (SR 794), near the Boca Raton Tri-Rail station. Proceeding north, it intersects exit 50 of I-95 and a park & ride via a connecting segment. The road jogs east, becoming increasingly closer to the interstate highway as the roads continue north. The road passes through Delray Beach and Boynton Beach, serving a number of malls, shopping centers, and local businesses, especially concentrated around Atlantic Avenue (SR 806) and Boynton Beach Boulevard (SR 804). In Boynton, the road intersects Gateway Boulevard near the Renaissance Commons, a shopping center and restaurant locale built on the former site of a Motorola plant.

In Lake Worth, the next major intersection, is with Hypoluxo Road, which leads to a number of public schools. The busy intersection with Congress and County Road 812 (Lantana Road) sits at the southwest corner of Palm Beach County Park Airport, locally known as Lantana Airport. Now in Lantana, the boulevard passes the JFK Medical Center. At Lake Worth Road (SR 802), CR 807 ends and SR 807 begins (this transition previously occurred at Lantana Road).

Although the county road segment is the longest, the county road designation itself is rarely referred to when giving verbal directions.

=== State Road 807 ===
State Road 807 begins at the intersection with Lake Worth Road (SR 802). On the southeastern corner is a local campus of Palm Beach State College. Proceeding north, SR 807 enters Palm Springs and intersects Forest Hill Boulevard (SR 882) before clipping the western corner of Glen Ridge and entering West Palm Beach. SR 807 terminates at an interchange with Southern Boulevard (US 98 / SR 80). The road continues northeast towards President Donald J. Trump International Airport as Australian Avenue (County Road 704A), but another segment of Congress Avenue exists north of the airport, parallel to Australian.

=== Local segment ===
Another section of Congress Avenue exists north of the airport. It begins at Belvedere Road in West Palm Beach, just north of the airport. In the neighborhood of Palm Beach Lakes, the road crosses underneath Interstate 95 and proceeds parallel to the east. Congress Avenue terminates at Northlake Boulevard in North Palm Beach. This segment is 8.5 miles (13.68 km) long and has no state or county road designation.

== Major intersections ==
The entire route is in Palm Beach County.

| Location | mi | km | Destinations | Notes |
|---|---|---|---|---|
| Boca Raton | 0.00 | 0.00 | SR 794 (Yamato Road) to I-95 | |
| Boca Raton | 2.10 | 3.38 | I-95 – West Palm Beach, Miami | Exit 50 on I-95; access via connector road |
| Delray Beach | 3.40 | 5.47 | Linton Boulevard (CR 782) | Former SR 782 |
| Delray Beach | 4.90 | 7.89 | SR 806 (Atlantic Avenue) to I-95 | |
| Boynton Beach | 8.50 | 13.68 | Woolbright Road (CR 792) to I-95 | |
| Boynton Beach | 9.50 | 15.29 | SR 804 (Boynton Beach Boulevard) to I-95 / Florida's Turnpike | |
| Atlantis | 13.80 | 22.21 | Lantana Road (CR 812) | Former SR 812 |
| | 15.3 | 24.6 | 6th Avenue South to I-95 | |
| Palm Springs | 15.90 0.000 | 25.59 0.000 | SR 802 (Lake Worth Road) to Florida's Turnpike | Transition from CR 807 to SR 807 |
| Palm Springs | 0.769 | 1.238 | 10th Avenue North to I-95 | |
| Palm Springs | 2.300 | 3.701 | SR 882 (Forest Hill Boulevard) to I-95 | |
| Glen Ridge | 4.291 | 6.906 | US 98 / SR 80 (Southern Boulevard) to I-95 / Florida's Turnpike | interchange |
| President Donald J. Trump International Airport | 4.809 | 7.739 | Australian Avenue (CR 704A north) – President Donald J. Trump International Airport | SR 807 transitions to CR 704A |
| President Donald J. Trump International Airport | Connection made via 1.9 miles (3.06 km) of Australian Avenue (CR 704A) and Belvedere Road | | | |
| Westgate | 0.00 | 0.00 | Belvedere Road – President Donald J. Trump International Airport | Southern terminus of locally-maintained segment |
| West Palm Beach | 1.00 | 1.61 | SR 704 (Okeechobee Boulevard) to I-95 | |
| West Palm Beach | 2.40 | 3.86 | Palm Beach Lakes Boulevard (CR 716) | |
| West Palm Beach | 5.00 | 8.05 | 45th Street (CR 702) | Former SR 702 |
| Riviera Beach | 5.80 | 9.33 | SR 710 (Martin Luther King Jr. Boulevard) | |
| Riviera Beach | 6.60 | 10.62 | SR 708 (Blue Heron Boulevard) to I-95 | |
| Palm Beach Gardens | 8.50 | 13.68 | Northlake Boulevard (CR 809A) | Former SR 809A |
1.000 mi = 1.609 km; 1.000 km = 0.621 mi: Route transition
