= Atlantic Avenue =

Atlantic Avenue may refer to:

== Highways ==
- Atlantic Avenue (Boston) in Massachusetts
- Atlantic Avenue (New York City) in Brooklyn and Queens, New York
- Florida State Road 806 in Palm Beach County, locally known as Atlantic Avenue
- Atlantic Avenue in Atlantic City, New Jersey, one of the city's many streets used in the game of Monopoly
- Atlantic Boulevard (Los Angeles County), known as Atlantic Avenue for several miles of its length

== Commuter rail ==
- Atlantic Avenue Tunnel in Brooklyn, now a historic site, opened in 1844
- Atlantic Avenue station (Tri-Rail), a proposed commuter rail station in Delray Beach, Florida

== Subway stations ==
- Atlantic Avenue – Barclays Center (New York City Subway), a station complex at Flatbush and Fourth Avenues in Brooklyn, consisting of:
  - Atlantic Avenue – Barclays Center (IRT Eastern Parkway Line); serving the 2, 3, 4, and 5 trains
  - Atlantic Avenue – Barclays Center (BMT Brighton Line); serving the B and Q trains
  - Atlantic Avenue – Barclays Center (BMT Fourth Avenue Line); serving the D, N, R, and W trains
  - Atlantic Avenue (BMT Fifth Avenue Line); demolished
- Atlantic Avenue (BMT Canarsie Line), a station at Van Sinderen Avenue in Brooklyn; serving the L train

== Music ==
- Atlantic Avenue, a song by Average White Band from their 1979 album Feel No Fret.

== See also ==
- Atlantic Boulevard (disambiguation)
- Atlantic station (disambiguation)
