= High Point, Florida =

High Point is the name of two places in the U.S. state of Florida:

- High Point, Hernando County, Florida
- High Point, Palm Beach County, Florida

== See also ==
- List of Florida's highest points
