= Military Trail (Florida) =

Road in Florida, United States

Military Trail
- State Road 809 and County Road 809
- SR 809 in red, CR 809 in blue, Broward County portion in grey

Route information
- Maintained by FDOT, Palm Beach E&PW, Broward Public Works, and the City of Deerfield Beach
- Length: 46.2 mi (74.4 km) 15.2 mi (24.46 km) as SR 809; 27.1 mi (43.61 km) as CR 809

Major junctions
- South end: SR 834 in Pompano Beach
- SR 810 in Deerfield Beach: SR 806 in Delray Beach; SR 804 in Boynton Beach; SR 802 in Greenacres; SR 882 in Palm Springs; US 98 / SR 80 in Royal Palm Estates; SR 704 in Westgate; SR 710 in Riviera Beach; SR 786 in Palm Beach Gardens; I-95 in Palm Beach Gardens
- North end: SR 706 in Jupiter

Location
- Country: United States
- State: Florida
- County: Palm Beach

Highway system
- Florida State Highway System; Interstate; US; State; Former; Pre‑1945; Toll; Scenic
← SR 808	→ SR 810

Military Trail is a 46.2-mile (74.35 km) long six-lane north–south arterial road in Broward and Palm Beach counties in South Florida. A portion of the road is designated State Road 809 (SR 809), but most of the road within Palm Beach County is locally maintained and signed as County Road 809 (CR 809), while the Broward County section exists without either designation.

Military Trail, like the paralleling Congress Avenue and Jog and Powerline Roads, is a popular commuting alternative to often-congested Interstate 95 (I-95), Florida's Turnpike, and U.S. Route 1 (US 1) in both counties.

The state-maintained segment currently begins at an intersection with Lake Worth Road (SR 802) in Greenacres and terminates at PGA Boulevard (SR 786) in Palm Beach Gardens. CR 809 exists in two sections––between PGA Boulevard and Jupiter and between Lake Worth Road and the Broward County line.

== Route description ==
=== Broward County ===
Military Trail is a continuation of Andrews Avenue Extension, which itself is a continuation of Andrews Avenue (CR 811A) built in the 2000s. At an intersection with Sample Road (SR 834), Andrews Avenue transitions to Military Trail. For the first 2 miles (3.22 km), the road is cosigned as Northwest 9th Avenue in the Deerfield Beach numbering system, before jogging to the east and intersecting Southwest 10th Street, which is an eastward extension of the Sawgrass Expressway (SR 869). Shortly after crossing Hillsboro Boulevard (SR 810), Military Trail bridges the Hillsboro Canal and enters Palm Beach County.

Although this segment of Military Road is unnumbered, it is maintained by the City of Deerfield Beach from Northwest 54th Street to Hillsboro Boulevard and county-maintained elsewhere.

=== Palm Beach County ===
The southern segment of CR 809 begins at the Hillsboro Canal Bridge in Boca Raton. Throughout Palm Beach County, the road has a speed limit of 45 miles per hour (72.42 km/h) and has three lanes in each direction, primarily serving shopping centers, malls, restaurants, businesses. Military Trail intersects Palmetto Park Road (CR 798), but not Glades Road (SR 808) due to an elevation change. Glades passes over Military Trail due to it being very close to the Tri-Rail tracks and Interstate 95, so access is provided by nearby service roads, which also serve the Boca Town Center. Military Trail also intersects Yamato Road in Boca, which exists east of CR 809 as SR 794 and west as CR 794. Still in Boca, Military Trail also intersects Clint Moore Road. As it enters Delray Beach, Military connects with Linton Boulevard (CR 782) and West Atlantic Avenue (SR 806), which provides access to downtown Delray. In Boynton Beach, the road intersects Woolbright Road (CR 792), Boynton Beach Boulevard (SR 804), and Gateway Boulevard. In Delray and Boynton, Military Trail also provides access to the many country clubs located off the road. In Greenacres, Military Trail intersects with Lake Worth Road (SR 802) and CR 809 transitions to SR 809.

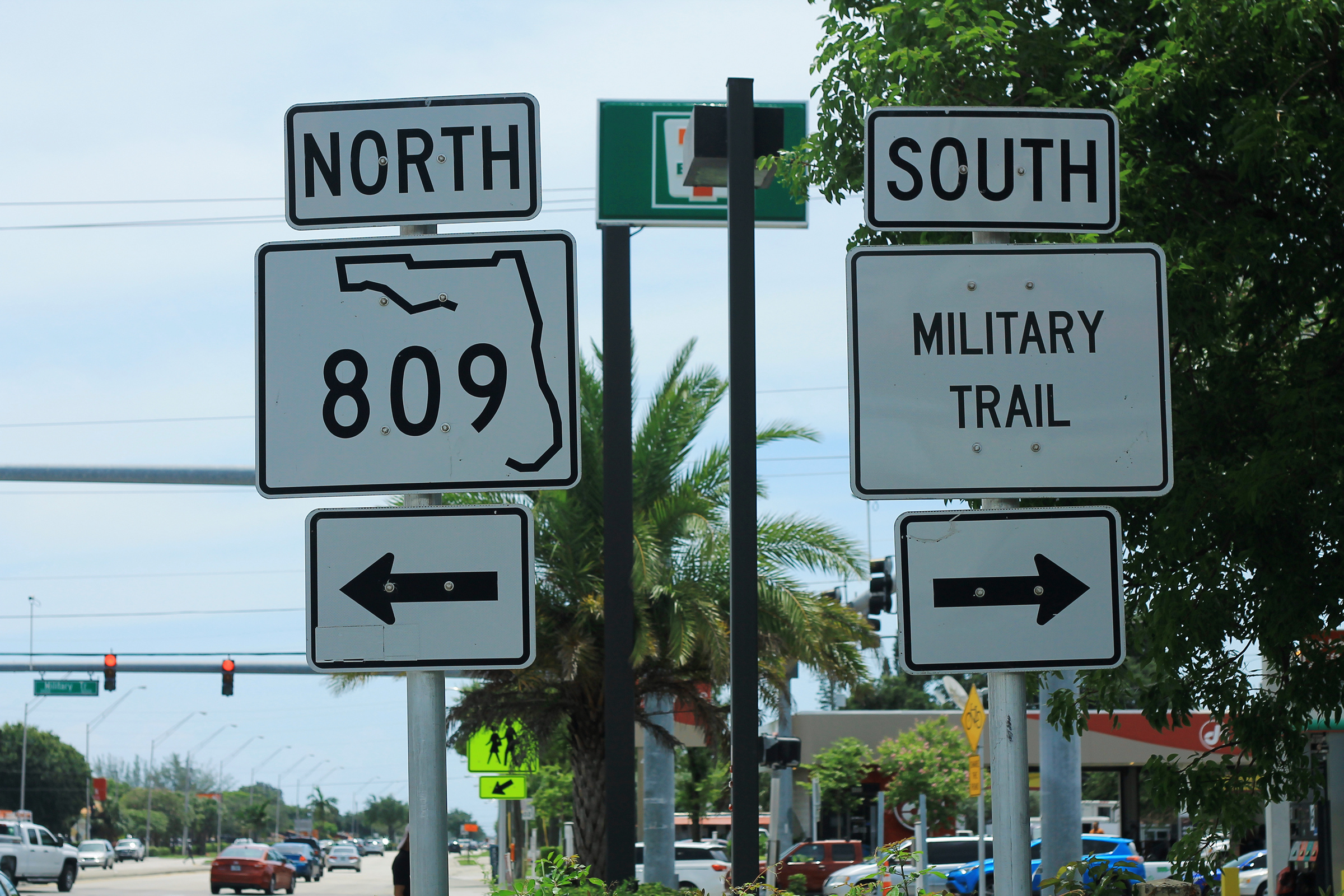
Signage along Lake Worth (SR 802) Road showing the transition of Military Trail to SR 809)

SR 809 begins at the intersection of Military Trail and Lake Worth Road. SR 809 intersects Southern Boulevard (US 98 and SR 80) in a diamond interchange. For the next mile, SR 809 acts as the western border of Palm Beach International Airport, until intersecting with Belvedere Road. One mile north of the northern end of the airport, it intersects Okeechobee Boulevard (SR 704), a major intersection in the city. Continuing north, Military Trail passes by Northwood University to the east, and north of Community Drive, SR 809 becomes a service road for housing developments. Following an intersection with 45th Street (CR 702), SR 809 leaves West Palm Beach and enters Riviera Beach. There, it intersects with the Bee Line Highway (SR 710) and Blue Heron Boulevard (SR 708) at the outskirts of the West Palm Beach VA Medical Center. Continuing into Palm Beach Gardens, SR 809 ends at PGA Boulevard (SR 786).

At PGA Boulevard, SR 809 terminates and Military Trail once again becomes CR 809. This designation continues for just under 10 miles (16.09 km) north to Indiantown Road (SR 706) in Jupiter.

== History ==
Historically, SR 809 was 42.3 miles (68.08 km) long, extending from Palmetto Park Road (CR 798) to Indian Town Road (SR 706). With the exception of the section between Lake Worth Road and PGA Boulevard, the road was converted to a county road in 2004.

Military Trail is named for the trail blazed by U.S. Army Tennessee and Missouri Volunteer forces, from a Fort in Jupiter, south to a Fort in Fort Lauderdale during the Second Seminole War.

== Major intersections ==
County	Location	mi	km	Destinations	Notes
Broward	Pompano Beach	0.00	0.00	SR 834 (Sample Road) / Andrews Avenue Extension south	
Broward	Deerfield Beach	2.50	4.02	SR 869 (Southwest 10th Street) / Sawgrass Expressway	
Broward	Deerfield Beach	3.20	5.15	SR 810 (Hillsboro Boulevard) to I-95	
Hillsboro Canal		3.90 0.000	6.28 0.000	Bridge (southern terminus of CR 809)	
Palm Beach	Boca Raton	1.600	2.575	Palmetto Park Road (CR 798) to I-95	
Palm Beach	Boca Raton	2.500	4.023	Town Center Road to I-95 / Turnpike – Town Center	Also serves SR 808
Palm Beach	Boca Raton	4.400	7.081	Spanish River Boulevard east	Former SR 800
Palm Beach	Boca Raton	4.800	7.725	SR 794 east / CR 794 west (Yamato Road) to I-95	Western terminus of SR 794
Palm Beach	Delray Beach	7.900	12.714	Linton Boulevard (CR 782) to I-95	
Palm Beach	Delray Beach	9.200	14.806	SR 806 (West Atlantic Avenue) to I-95 / Florida's Turnpike	
Palm Beach	Golf	12.900	20.761	Woolbright Road (CR 792) to I-95	
Palm Beach		14.000	22.531	SR 804 (Boynton Beach Boulevard) to I-95 / Florida's Turnpike	
Palm Beach		15.300	24.623	Gateway Boulevard to I-95	
Palm Beach		17.200	27.681	Hypoluxo Road to I-95	
Palm Beach	Atlantis	18.400	29.612	CR 812 (Lantana Road) to I-95	
Palm Beach	Greenacres	19.700	31.704	Melaleuca Lane to I-95	
Palm Beach	Greenacres	20.359	32.765	SR 802 (Lake Worth Road) to Florida's Turnpike	Transition from CR 809 to SR 809
Palm Beach		21.122	33.993	10th Avenue North to I-95	
Palm Beach	Palm Springs	22.660	36.468	SR 882 (Forest Hill Boulevard) to I-95 / US 441	
Palm Beach	Royal Palm Estates	24.491	39.414	US 98 / SR 80 (Southern Boulevard) to I-95 / Florida's Turnpike / US 441 – Airport	Diamond interchange
Palm Beach	Haverhill	25.461	40.976	Belvedere Road to I-95 – Palm Beach International Airport	
Palm Beach	Westgate	26.499	42.646	SR 704 (Okeechobee Boulevard) to I-95 / Florida's Turnpike – Airport	
Palm Beach	West Palm Beach	30.149	48.520	CR 702 (45th Street) to I-95	
Palm Beach	Riviera Beach	31.530	50.743	SR 710 (Martin Luther King Jr. Boulevard / Beeline Highway)	
Palm Beach	Riviera Beach	31.788	51.158	SR 708 (Blue Heron Boulevard) to I-95 / US 1 – VA Hospital	
Palm Beach	Palm Beach Gardens	33.545	53.985	Northlake Boulevard (CR 809A)	
Palm Beach	Palm Beach Gardens	35.561	57.230	SR 786 (PGA Boulevard) to I-95 / Florida's Turnpike	Transition from SR 809 to CR 809
Palm Beach	Palm Beach Gardens	35.961	57.874	I-95 north – Daytona Beach	Exit 79C on I-95
Palm Beach	Palm Beach Gardens–Jupiter line	38.661	62.219	Donald Ross Road to I-95	
Palm Beach	Jupiter	42.161	67.852	SR 706 (Indiantown Road) to I-95 / Florida's Turnpike	Northern terminus of CR 809
1.000 mi = 1.609 km; 1.000 km = 0.621 mi: Route transition
