= Florida State Road 806 =

Highway in Florida

State Road 806
- Atlantic Avenue

Route information
- Maintained by FDOT
- Length: 9.180 mi (14.774 km)
- Existed: 1945 renumbering (definition)–present

Major junctions
- West end: US 441 near Kings Point
- Florida's Turnpike near Kings Point; I-95 in Delray Beach; US 1 in Delray Beach
- East end: SR A1A in Delray Beach

Location
- Country: United States
- State: Florida
- Counties: Palm Beach

Highway system
- Florida State Highway System; Interstate; US; State; Former; Pre‑1945; Toll; Scenic
← SR 805	→ SR 807

State Road 806 (SR 806), locally known as Atlantic Avenue, is the primary east–west highway of Delray Beach in Palm Beach County, Florida. Not to be confused with parallel Atlantic Boulevard (SR 814) 15 miles (24.14 km) to the south, Atlantic Avenue extends from U.S. Route 441 (US 441) and SR 7 eastward to SR A1A just north of Highland Beach. East of Military Trail (County Road 809 or CR 809), SR 806 is in the city of Delray Beach; to the west of Military Trail, the road stretches through unincorporated Palm Beach County in the CDPs of High Point, Kings Point, and the Villages of Oriole.

Along with the north-south Swinton Avenue (one-half mile west of the one-way pair forming US 1 and its hidden designation, SR 5), Atlantic Avenue forms the north-south dividing line for Delray Beach addresses. West of Swinton Avenue, SR 806 technically runs along West Atlantic Avenue, with East Atlantic Avenue forming the short distance (in comparison with West Atlantic) between Swinton Avenue and SR A1A. Although SR 806 is a large commercial and commuter road, several golf courses have access from Atlantic Avenue between Florida's Turnpike (SR 91) and Interstate 95 (I-95 or SR 9).

== Route description ==
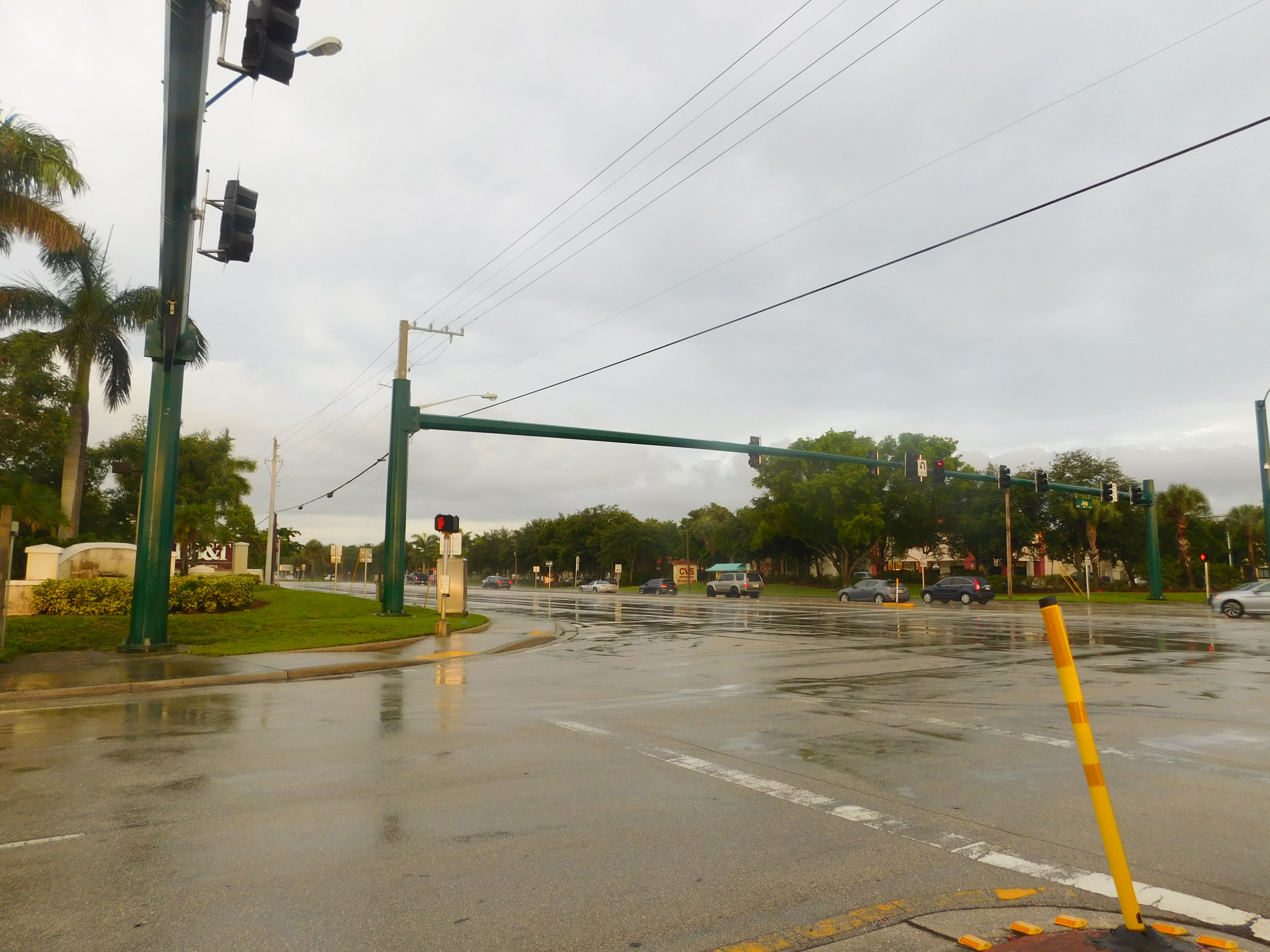
SR 806 from Jog Road in Delray Beach

SR 806 begins at a divided intersection with US 441 and SR 7) in the outskirts of Delray Beach near the Arthur R. Marshall Loxahatchee National Wildlife Refuge. SR 806 heads eastward along West Atlantic Avenue, a four-lane divided highway but quickly becomes two lanes and enters a small commercial district. The progression of the highway continues for a distance along West Atlantic Avenue, intersecting with several local streets and passing through some large groves and fields. After the intersection with Starkey Road, SR 806 divides back into four lanes, as it enters an interchange with Florida's Turnpike (unsigned SR 91). West Atlantic Avenue first intersects with the entranceway and exit ramp from the turnpike southbound and continues eastward over a stream. After passing under the eight lanes of the Turnpike, SR 806 intersects with the ramp to the northbound lanes. After leaving the large interchange with the turnpike, the highway continues eastward along the country clubs in Delray Beach, beginning with an intersection to the Lexington Club on the eastbound lanes. After that, State Road 806 continues, passing Eagle Point and soon intersecting with Hagen Ranch Road at a traffic light. The route then passes Kings Point Country Club and to the south of the Villages of Oriole, where the highway continues as six lanes, turning southeastward until intersecting with Jog Road (the northern continuation of SR 845) in Delray Beach.

SR 806 continues eastward from Jog Road along West Atlantic Avenue, crossing through several country clubs as a six-lane highway with a divided median. At El Clair Ranch Road, the highway makes a gradual curve to the northeast, passing through a commercial strip near Lakes of Delray Boulevard. SR 806 continues northeastward, crossing with Via Flora, where it returns to its eastward progression. Along West Atlantic, the highway crosses through another commercial strip while staying a six lane arterial boulevard. Soon after, the highway intersects with CR 809 (Military Trail) at a traffic light in the midst of the strip, entering incorporated Delray Beach at the intersection. State Road 806 continues eastward, crossing through more of the country clubs as a four lane boulevard. The highway continues with the divided median and begins to make a short progression to the southeast and soon to the northeast. State Road 806 then crosses another body of water and crosses to an intersection with Congress Avenue, the northern extension of SR 807 and currently part of CR 807. After Congress, West Atlantic heads to the northeast, approaching the Florida East Coast Railway and the site of a proposed Tri-Rail station. After crossing the tracks at-grade, SR 806 and West Atlantic interchange with I-95 (unsigned SR 9). The highway crosses through the partial cloverleaf and crosses under the ten lanes of I-95.

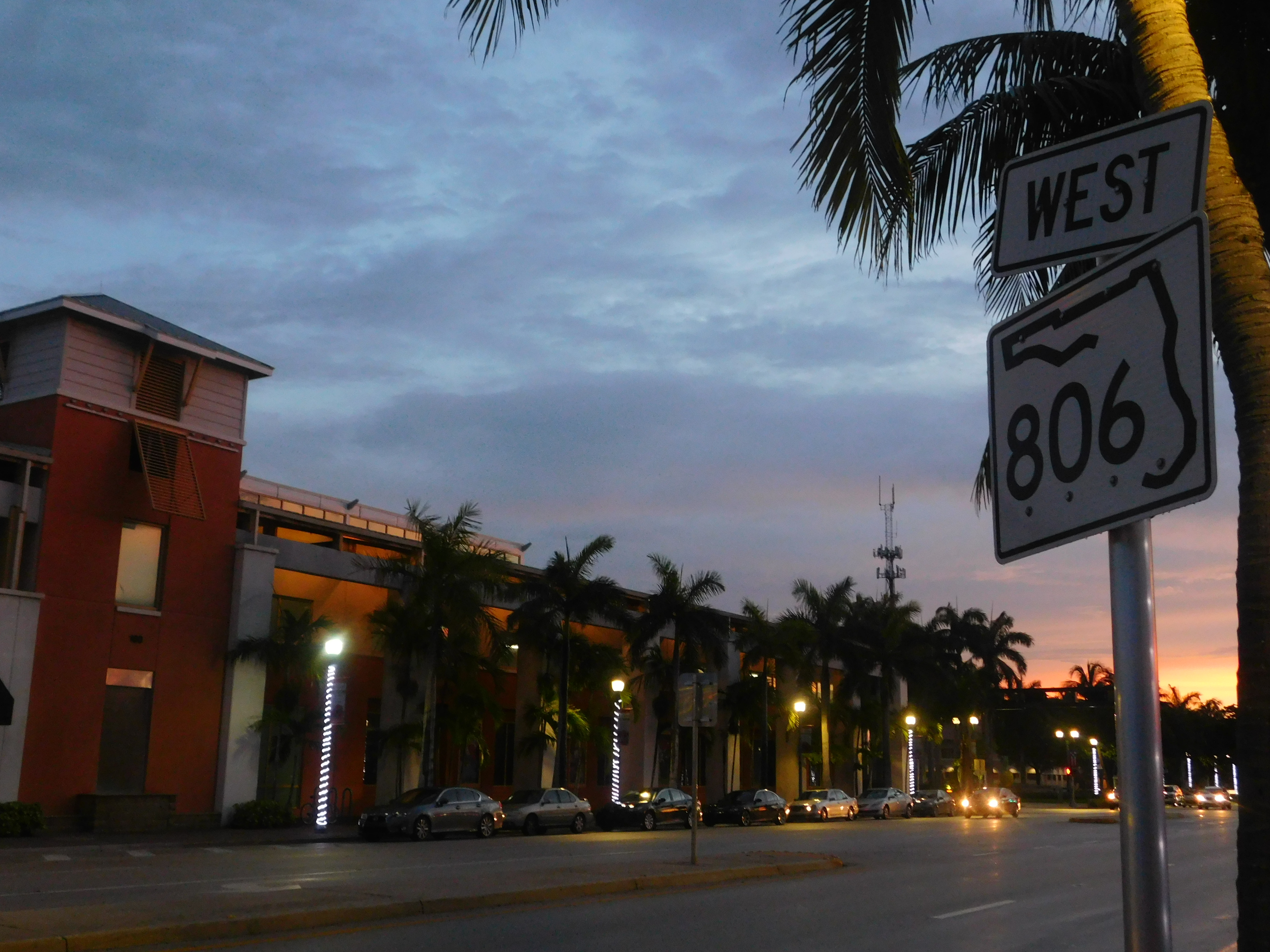
SR 806 (Atlantic Avenue) through downtown Delray Beach

After the interchange with I-95, West Atlantic Avenue continues eastward, entering downtown Delray Beach, where the highway begins intersecting with numbered local streets now as a four-lane boulevard. The surroundings become a mix of residences and commercial industries until NW 6th Avenue, when it becomes purely commercial. SR 806 passes to the south of the Delray Beach Tennis Center and its lanes begin to merge as the highway approaches the intersection with Swinton Avenue. At Swinton Avenue, West Atlantic Avenue changes names to East Atlantic Avenue, and SR 806 continues eastward along East Atlantic. Also at the intersection with Swinton Avenue, SR 806 narrows to a two lane undivided avenue. At this point, the state has relinquished control of East Atlantic to the city of Delray Beach, and the segment is not part of SR 806. At the intersection with North Railroad Avenue, the road crosses the Florida East Coast Railroad and continues through downtown Delray Beach. At the intersection with NE 5th Avenue, East Atlantic Avenue intersects with US 1 (unsigned SR 5) southbound, where the state regains control of the road and SR 806 resumes. A block later, the route intersects the US 1 northbound lanes (NE 6th Avenue). SR 806 widens to a four lane undivided avenue for the remainder of East Atlantic. After US 1, the highway continues eastward, crossing Veterans Park and then crossing over Intracoastal Waterway on a large drawbridge. After the drawbridge, East Atlantic Avenue continues eastward, passing several high-rise residences until terminating at an intersection with SR A1A in Delray Beach, along the Atlantic Ocean.

== History ==
State Road 806 was established in the 1945 renumbering as a road extending from US 441 /SR 7 to US 1 / SR 5 in Delray Beach, and extended to SR A1A at a later point. Prior to the 1945 renumbering, it was State Road 198.

== Major intersections ==
The entire route is in Palm Beach County.

Location	mi	km	Destinations	Notes
	0.000	0.000	US 441 (SR 7) / Atlantic Avenue west	Road continues west without designation
	1.860	2.993	Florida's Turnpike	Exit 81 on Turnpike
Kings Point	3.560	5.729	Jog Road	Former northern terminus of SR 845
Delray Beach	5.165	8.312	Military Trail (CR 809)	Former SR 809
Delray Beach	6.974	11.224	Congress Avenue (CR 807)	Former SR 807
Delray Beach	7.300	11.748	I-95 – West Palm Beach, Miami	Exit 52 on I-95
Delray Beach	8.270	13.309	Swinton Avenue (Downtown Bypass) to US 1	State maintenance ends
Delray Beach	8.582	13.811	US 1 south (Southeast 5th Avenue)	State maintenance resumes
Delray Beach	8.647	13.916	US 1 north (Northeast 6th Avenue / Downtown Bypass) to I-95	
Delray Beach	8.815– 8.860	14.186– 14.259	Bridge over the Intracoastal Waterway	
Delray Beach	9.180	14.774	SR A1A (Ocean Boulevard)	
1.000 mi = 1.609 km; 1.000 km = 0.621 mi: Tolled; Route transition

== See also ==
- County Road 806A (Palm Beach County, Florida)
