= Lake Clarke Shores, Florida =

Town in the state of Florida, United States

- Town
- Town of Lake Clarke Shores
- Seal

- Location of Lake Clarke Shores, Florida
- Coordinates: 26°38′46″N 80°04′31″W
- Country: United States
- State: Florida
- County: Palm Beach
- Settled: 1897–1930s
- Incorporated: July 1, 1957

Government
  - Type: Council–Manager
  - Mayor: Christy Maasbach
  - Vice Mayor: Gregory P. Freebold
  - Council Members: Bridget Keating and Mayor Pro Tem; Taylor Materio
  - Town Manager: Joseph F. Lo Bello
  - Town Clerk: Mary Pinkerman

Area
  - Total: 1.03 sq mi (2.68 km^{2})
  - Land: 0.92 sq mi (2.39 km^{2})
  - Water: 0.11 sq mi (0.29 km^{2})
- Elevation: 13 ft (4.0 m)

Population (2020)
  - Total: 3,564
  - Density: 3,862.6/sq mi (1,491.35/km^{2})
- Time zone: UTC-5 (Eastern (EST))
  - Summer (DST): UTC-4 (EDT)
- ZIP code: 33406
- Area codes: 561, 728
- FIPS code: 12-37800
- GNIS feature ID: 2405971
- Website: www.townoflcs.com

Lake Clarke Shores is a town in Palm Beach County, Florida, United States. The town is part of the Miami metropolitan area of South Florida. The 2020 census recorded a population of 3,564.

The town was named after John Newton Clarke, who first filed a homestead claim in the area in 1889. Clarke intended to capitalize on the business of growing pineapples, but his efforts were ultimately unsuccessful. Very few people lived in the area until local attorney Walter Travers created a plan to develop a community around Lake Clarke and purchased 250 acres (100 ha) of land for $10,000 in the late 1940s. The completion of a bridge across the West Palm Beach Canal in 1953 spurred a further growth in population. With rumors spreading that West Palm Beach intended to annex the community, residents voted by a wide margin to support the incorporation of Lake Clarke Shores as a town on April 10, 1956, which the Florida Legislature officially approved on July 1, 1957.

Today, Lake Clarke Shores maintains a small population. The town is primarily a bedroom community, with most of its businesses and other commercial buildings located along Forest Hill Boulevard (State Road 882).

== History ==
The Town of Lake Clarke Shores was named after John Newton Clarke, a general store grocer, postmaster in Lake Worth (now known as Lake Worth Beach), and Royal Poinciana Hotel employee who filed a homestead claim (via the Homestead Acts) in 1889, for a 139 acre (56 hectare) area of land on the eastern shore of a lake situated just west of West Palm Beach. Clarke would later name the lake after himself. He also purchased 5 acres (2.0 ha) of land in West Palm Beach near where Hillcrest Cemetery and Parker Avenue stand today. Attempting to capitalize on the promising pineapple growing business, Clarke used the property for growing pineapples and operating a packinghouse. However, the thriving pineapple business in South Florida suffered extensive losses in 1910, and the completion Henry Flagler's railway to Key West in 1912, allowed pineapples from Cuba to be shipped to the northern United States more cost-effectively than from Florida. Clarke and many others in South Florida abandoned the pineapple industry by 1915. Thereafter, Clarke used the land as a fishing retreat. However, Lake Clarke, which had stretched from Southern Boulevard (State Road 84) to the city of Lake Worth, was reduced to a marsh and fell about 8 ft (2.4 m) in height in 1917 upon completion of the West Palm Beach Canal.

In the early 1930s, Zeb Vance Hooker and his family became the first settlers in modern-day Lake Clarke Shores by squatting in a wooden shack on land by the southeast side of Lake Clarke. In 1946, Patsy Renolds built a house where Antigua Road stands today and is the oldest home in Lake Clarke Shores. By the late 1940s, local attorney Walter Travers visited the area and bought the lakeshore properties from their respective owners. Travers then attempted to buy land which had been drained during the construction of the West Palm Beach Canal in the 1910s. The state of Florida initially denied his request. However, after meeting with the Trustees of the Internal Improvement Fund in Tallahassee, the board offered Travers the land for $300 per acre. Travers partially agreed but attempted to negotiate a lesser cost for land at lower elevations. The state then decided to auction the land. Travers was the only bidder and obtained 250 acres (100 ha) of land on the northwest periphery of the lake for $10,000, which a friend loaned to him. After obtaining $5,000 for an unrelated lawsuit settlement, Travers invested that money into his project to transform the area into a waterfront community and brought in dredging equipment in 1949. The fledgling community initially grew very slowly, with just three homes built by 1952. One reason for the slow growth was the lack of a bridge across the West Palm Beach Canal. Palm Beach County Commissioner Lake Lytal convinced the county commission to approve the building of a bridge, knowing that Travers intended to contribute $10,000 to its construction. The bridge, completed in 1953, connected Selby Road and Forest Hill Boulevard (State Road 882) – with the entirety of the road becoming Forest Hill Boulevard – and resulted in a quicker increase in development and population.

Rumors spread that West Palm Beach planned to annex the area, prompting 60 people to form the Lake Clarke Property Owners’ Association in 1955. The association first met at a private residence, before meeting regularly at Meadow Park Elementary School. After reaching consensus on the name Lake Clarke Shores, residents met there on April 10, 1956, to decide on incorporation. Because the Florida Legislature did not meet in 1956, incorporation would have to be supported by two-thirds of voters. A total of 117 votes were cast, with 113 in favor and 4 in opposition to incorporating. Thus, the motion succeeded. William H. McLaughlin was unanimously selected to be the first mayor of Lake Clarke Shores, while Horace J. Cunningham, William M. Diemer, Robert G. Hillbert, Charles G. Platt, and Frank M. Seay served as the town's first aldermen. Other elected officials included Betty Diemer as town clerk, William H. Blythe as town marshal, and John Farrell as town attorney. The Florida Legislature approved the citizens vote to incorporate on July 1, 1957, when the town was granted the State Charter.

Development continued rapidly after Forest Hill Community High School opened just across the West Palm Beach Canal from Lake Clark Shores in 1958. The first census of the town occurred in 1960, which recorded a population of 1,297. In its early years, Lake Clarke Shores was almost entirely residential in nature. A 1962 description of the town in The Palm Beach Post noted that Forest Hill Baptist Church (now New Life Alliance Church) was the only non-residential building. However, the town council began passing ordinances later in the 1960s to allow commercial properties along Forest Hill Boulevard. The first commercial building, a gas station, opened at the corner of Forest Hill Boulevard and Florida Mango Road in June 1967. The town council, having long recognized the need for a town hall, finally authorized the construction of a town hall on Barbados Road in the 1970s, which opened in August 1974. The town hall would be dedicated on February 20, 1977. About 10 years later, in May 1987, a building headquartering the Lake Clarke Shores Police Department was completed.

== Geography ==
Lake Clarke Shores is located adjacent to the cities of West Palm Beach and Lake Worth Beach. Direct access to those cities is by Forest Hill Boulevard and Keller Road respectively. The Village of Palm Springs is located directly west of the town. The town is roughly bounded by Interstate 95 to the east, Florida Mango Road to the west, Summit Boulevard to the north, less the Lake Patrick neighborhood, and 10th Avenue North to the south, less the Waterside neighborhood.

Located in the east-central portion of the county, the town is situated just west of the south end of West Palm Beach, north and west of the north end of Lake Worth Beach, and east of Palm Springs.

LAccording to the United States Census Bureau, the town has a total area of 1.0 square mile (2.6 km^{2}), of which 1.0 square mile (2.6 km^{2}) is land and 0.1 square miles (0.26 km^{2}) (7.62%) is water.

== Demographics ==
Historical population
Census	Pop.	Note	%±
1960	1,297		—
1970	2,328		79.5%
1980	3,174		36.3%
1990	3,364		6.0%
2000	3,451		2.6%
2010	3,376		−2.2%
2020	3,564		5.6%
U.S. Decennial Census

=== 2020 census ===
As of the 2020 census, Lake Clarke Shores had a population of 3,564. The median age was 46.1 years. 19.0% of residents were under the age of 18 and 20.7% of residents were 65 years of age or older. For every 100 females there were 93.2 males, and for every 100 females age 18 and over there were 91.0 males age 18 and over.

100.0% of residents lived in urban areas, while 0.0% lived in rural areas.

There were 1,414 households in Lake Clarke Shores, of which 31.0% had children under the age of 18 living in them. Of all households, 55.8% were married-couple households, 12.4% were households with a male householder and no spouse or partner present, and 24.3% were households with a female householder and no spouse or partner present. About 20.4% of all households were made up of individuals and 10.1% had someone living alone who was 65 years of age or older.

There were 1,478 housing units, of which 4.3% were vacant. The homeowner vacancy rate was 0.9% and the rental vacancy rate was 7.4%.

Lake Clarke Shores racial composition (Hispanics excluded from racial categories) (NH = Non-Hispanic)
Race	Number	Percentage
White (NH)	2,137	59.96%
Black or African American (NH)	100	2.81%
Native American or Alaska Native (NH)	2	0.06%
Asian (NH)	56	1.57%
Pacific Islander or Native Hawaiian (NH)	6	0.17%
Some other race (NH)	14	0.39%
Two or more races/Multiracial (NH)	84	2.36%
Hispanic or Latino (any race)	1,165	32.69%
Total	3,564	

The US Census Bureau's 2020 American Community Survey 5-year estimates reported 864 families residing in the town.

=== 2010 census ===
Lake Clarke Shores Demographics
2010 Census	Lake Clarke Shores	Palm Beach County	Florida
Total population	3,376	1,320,134	18,801,310
Population, percent change, 2000 to 2010	-2.2%	+16.7%	+17.6%
Population density	3,480.4/sq mi	670.2/sq mi	350.6/sq mi
White or Caucasian (including White Hispanic)	90.1%	73.5%	75.0%
(Non-Hispanic White or Caucasian)	70.8%	60.1%	57.9%
Black or African-American	2.1%	17.3%	16.0%
Hispanic or Latino (of any race)	24.7%	19.0%	22.5%
Asian	1.4%	2.4%	2.4%
Native American or Native Alaskan	0.1%	0.5%	0.4%
Pacific Islander or Native Hawaiian	0.0%	0.1%	0.1%
Two or more races (Multiracial)	1.0%	2.3%	2.5%
Some Other Race	0.0%	3.9%	3.6%

As of the 2010 United States census, there were 3,376 people, 1,312 households, and 903 families residing in the town.

In 2010, the town's age distribution was 17.8% at 65 or older, 19.3% was under 18, 5.6% from 18 to 24, 22.7% from 25 to 44, and 34.6% from 45 to 64; the median age was 46.5 years. For every 100 males, there were 107 females. For every 100 males age 18 and over, there were 93.5 females. Around 25.7% of the households in 2010 had children under the age of 18 living with them, 22.4% were married couples living together, 9.7% had a female householder with no spouse present, and 31.0% were not families. About 23.4% of all households were made up of one individual, and 32.3% had someone living alone who was 65 years of age or older. The average household size was 2.42, and the average family size was 2.87.

=== 2000 census ===
As of the census of 2000, there were 3,451 people, 1,407 households, and 1,029 families residing in the town. The population density was 3,538.9 inhabitants per square mile (1,366.4/km^{2}). There were 1,462 housing units at an average density of 1,499.2 per square mile (578.8/km^{2}). The racial makeup of the town was 93.16% White (77.8% were Non-Hispanic White), 1.04% African American, 0.23% Native American, 1.94% Asian, 0.03% Pacific Islander, 2.46% from other races, and 1.13% from two or more races. Hispanic or Latino of any race were 18.52% of the population.

As of 2000, there were 1,407 households, out of which 25.2% had children under the age of 18 living with them, 62.5% were married couples living together, 8.0% had a female householder with no husband present, and 26.8% were non-families. 21.0% of all households were made up of individuals, and 8.5% had someone living alone who was 65 years of age or older. The average household size was 2.45 and the average family size was 2.82.

In 2000, in the town, the population was spread out, with 18.8% under the age of 18, 5.9% from 18 to 24, 27.1% from 25 to 44, 29.6% from 45 to 64, and 18.5% who were 65 years of age or older. The median age was 44 years. For every 100 females, there were 98.9 males. For every 100 females age 18 and over, there were 95.3 males.

In 2000, the median income for a household in the town was $61,328, and the median income for a family was $71,641. Males had a median income of $48,000 versus $33,774 for females. The per capita income for the town was $31,526. About 2.3% of families and 4.0% of the population were below the poverty line, including 5.8% of those under age 18 and 3.2% of those age 65 or over.

As of 2000, speakers of English as a first language accounted for 84.76% of all residents, while Spanish was the mother tongue of 15.23% of the population.

As of 2000, Lake Clarke Shores had the forty-first highest percentage of Cuban residents in the US, with 10.08% of the town's population.

== Parks and recreation ==
The town of Lake Clarke Shores includes five parks and recreational areas:

- Community Park
- Boat Ramp Park
- Memorial Park
- Pine Tree Park
- Town Hall Park

Lake Clarke Shores is also located near Dreher Park, the Palm Beach Zoo, the South Florida Science Center and Aquarium, and the West Palm Beach Golf Course.

== Government ==
Lake Clarke Shores uses the council-manager form of government. The town has five elected officials – mayor, vice mayor, president pro tem, and two council members. Town council members are elected to two-year terms. Being a council–manager form of government, the Lake Clarke Shores council appoints a town manager, who oversees administrative functions of the town government. The town manager also recommends proposals for the town council and implements policies approved by the town council. Another public official is the town clerk, who essentially serves as the town's secretary.

Lake Clarke Shores is part of Florida's 22nd congressional district. The town at the state level is part of the 89th district of the Florida House of Representatives and Florida Senate's 24st district, both of which cover parts of east-central Palm Beach County. The town is also part of the 3rd district for the Palm Beach County Board of County Commissioners.

== Education ==
Lake Clarke Shores does not have public or private schools within its boundaries. Public schools students in the northern half of the town attend Meadow Park Elementary School and Conniston Community Middle School in West Palm Beach, while students in the southern half of Lake Clarke Shores are assigned to North Grade Elementary Schools and Lake Worth Middle School in Lake Worth Beach. Students throughout the town attend Forest Hill Community High School, which is immediately east of the town's boundaries. Nearby, the village of Palm Springs includes the G-Star School of the Arts, a charter high school.

There are no colleges or universities in the town of Lake Clarke Shores. However, the nearby cities of Lake Worth Beach and West Palm Beach contain a few public and private higher education institutes, including Keiser University, Palm Beach Atlantic University, and Palm Beach State College.

Lake Clarke Shores is located near the main branch of the Palm Beach County Library System.

== Media ==
The Lake Worth Herald and Coastal/Greenacres Observer, a weekly newspaper based in Lake Worth Beach, publishes stories about local news in the town. Residents of Lake Clarke Shores are also served by The Palm Beach Post, which is published in West Palm Beach. The Palm Beach Post had the 5th largest circulation for a newspaper in Florida as of November 2017 and is served to subscribers throughout Palm Beach County and the Treasure Coast.

Lake Clarke Shores is part of the West Palm Beach–Fort Pierce television market, ranked as the 38th largest in the United States by Nielsen Media Research. The market is served by stations affiliated with major American networks including WPTV-TV/5 (NBC), WPEC/12 (CBS), WPBF/25 (ABC), WFLX/29 (FOX), WTVX/34 (CW), WXEL-TV/42 (PBS), WTCN-CD/43 (MYTV), WWHB-CD/48 (Azteca), WHDT/59 (Court TV), WFGC/61 (CTN), WPXP-TV/67 (ION), as well as local channel WBWP-LD/57 (Ind.).

Many radio stations are located within range of the town.

== Infrastructure ==
=== Transportation ===
Forest Hill Boulevard, officially designated as State Road 882, crosses east-to-west in the northern part of the town, while the undesignated Florida Mango Road runs the north-to-south length of Lake Clarke Shores. Interstate 95 runs along the eastern boundary of the town, with an entrance and exit ramp on Forest Hill Boulevard just east of Lake Clarke Shores's boundaries.

The nearby city of West Palm Beach has two train stations in its downtown area. Tri-Rail and Amtrak serve the Tamarind Avenue station, while the higher speed Brightline serves the Evernia Street station. Another Tri-Rail station is located in Lake Worth Beach. The nearest airport is President Donald J. Trump International Airport in West Palm Beach. Palm Tran Route 46, which runs eastward and westward, has a few stops along Forest Hill Boulevard in Lake Clarke Shores and just outside the town limits.

=== Emergency services ===
The town of Lake Clarke Shores has operated a police department with full-time paid staff since November 1970, replacing its former volunteer force. In May 1987, the police department opened its own headquarters at the town hall complex on Barbados Road. The department employs a total of 37 people, with 11 full-time members, including Police Chief Wes Smith III. Although there is no longer a volunteer staff, the department continues to operate the Lake Clarke Shores Police Department's Citizen Observer Patrol Program, with volunteers annually spending an average of over 1,000 hours patrolling the streets and more than 200 hours assisting with administrative staff.

The police department building also includes an Emergency Operations Center for direct communications with the Federal Emergency Management Agency and Palm Beach County Emergency Management. The town also uses the CodeRED Emergency Notification System, which sends alerts about emergency situations to residents via their mobile devices. Fire and rescue services in Lake Clarke Shores are conducted by the Palm Beach County Fire Rescue.

== Notable people ==
- David Silvers, former member of the Florida House of Representatives
