= Gregory Road station =

Proposed railway station in Florida

Gregory Road

General information
- Location: Gregory Road & Georgia Avenue; West Palm Beach, Florida
- Line: Florida East Coast Railway
- Tracks: 2

Proposed services
Preceding station	Tri-Rail	Following station
Lake Avenue toward Fort Lauderdale	Green Line (proposed)	West Palm Beach toward Toney Penna

Gregory Road is a proposed Tri-Rail Coastal Link Green Line station in West Palm Beach, Florida. The station is slated for construction at Georgia Avenue and Gregory Road, just west of South Dixie Highway (US 1).
