= Florida State Road 802 =

State highway in Florida, United States

State Road 802

Route information
- Maintained by FDOT
- Length: 10.313 mi (16.597 km)
- Existed: 1945 renumbering (definition)–present

Major junctions
- West end: US 441 / SR 7 near Wellington
- Florida's Turnpike near Wellington; US 1 in Lake Worth Beach
- East end: SR A1A in Lake Worth Beach

Location
- Country: United States
- State: Florida
- Counties: Palm Beach

Highway system
- Florida State Highway System; Interstate; US; State; Former; Pre‑1945; Toll; Scenic
← SR 800	→ SR 804

State Road 802 (SR 802) is a major east–west highway serving central Palm Beach County, Florida spanning 10.313 miles (16.597 km). The western terminus of SR 802 is an intersection with U.S. Route 441 (US 441) and SR 7 near Wellington; the eastern terminus is an intersection with Ocean Boulevard (SR A1A) in Lake Worth Beach. State Road 802 is a major commuter highway that is also a primary access road for the beaches of Palm Beach County. The majority of SR 802 is known locally as Lake Worth Road.

== Route description ==
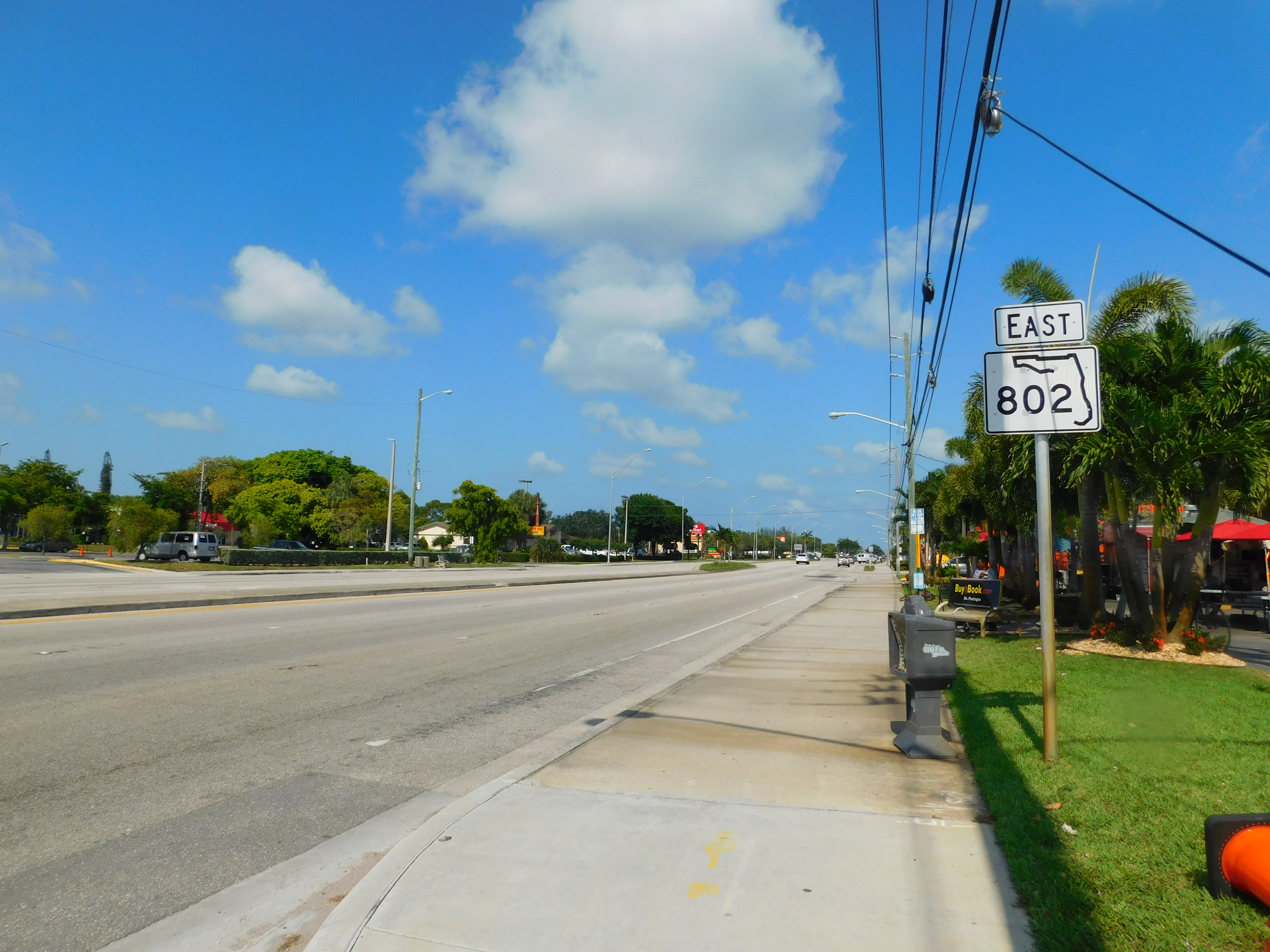
SR 802 east after Military Trail

SR 802 begins at the intersection between US 441–SR 7 just southeast of Wellington, with SR 802 taking Lake Worth Road east, with the road being lined with golf courses and other residential housing from the western terminus east to the interchange with Florida's Turnpike. Following the interchange, SR 802 becomes more commercial as it enters Greenacres. Lake Worth Road jogs slightly to the north just prior to the intersection with Jog Road, and continues through a mix of commercial and residential areas continuing eastward. At the intersection with SR 809 (Military Trail), it leaves Greenacres and enters Palm Springs, with SR 802 still heading east. Starting with the intersection with SR 807, it forms the northern border for the campus of Palm Beach Community College for several blocks, followed by the northern border of John Prince Memorial Park, then returning to a residential area as it heads for the overpass of Interstate 95 (I-95 or SR 9).

After crossing under I-95 without an interchange and passing Lake Worth Community High School, the road becomes a two way pair with Lake Avenue going eastbound and Lucerne Avenue going westbound, separated by a block. The roads pass through residential areas, as well as the site of a proposed Tri-Rail station, before hitting downtown Lake Worth Beach, crossing US 1, followed by SR 5. After a few more blocks, the roads become one again, crossing the Intracoastal Waterway, ending on the barrier island at SR A1A, less than a block away from the ocean.

West of US 441–SR 7, Lake Worth Road continues another 3.6 miles (5.8 km) to its terminus, an intersection with South Shore Drive in Wellington.

== History ==
State Road 802 was formed in 1945 in its current route. Prior to the 1945 renumbering, it was State Road 174 and State Road 201.

== Major intersections ==
The entire route is in Palm Beach County.

Location	mi	km	Destinations	Notes
	0.000	0.000	US 441 (SR 7) – Wellington	Road continues west without designation
	1.940	3.122	Florida's Turnpike – Orlando, Miami	Exit 93 on Turnpike
Greenacres	3.614	5.816	Jog Road	
Greenacres	5.677	9.136	SR 809 north / CR 809 south (Military Trail)	Northern terminus of CR 809; southern terminus of SR 809
Palm Springs	7.193	11.576	SR 807 north (Congress Avenue / CR 807 south) to I-95 north	Northern terminus of CR 807; southern terminus of SR 807
Lake Worth Beach	8.675	13.961	A Street to I-95	Traffic circle; western terminus of one-way pair
Lake Worth Beach	9.160	14.742	US 1 (Dixie Highway) to I-95	
Lake Worth Beach	9.466	15.234	SR 5 (Federal Highway)	
Lake Worth Beach	9.877– 10.174	15.895– 16.373	Harris Bridge over the Lake Worth Lagoon	
Lake Worth Beach	10.313	16.597	SR A1A (Ocean Boulevard)	
1.000 mi = 1.609 km; 1.000 km = 0.621 mi: Tolled
