= Lake Avenue station (Tri-Rail) =

Proposed rail station to be based in Florida

Lake Avenue

General information
- Location: Lake Avenue & South G Street; Lake Worth, Florida
- Line: Florida East Coast Railway
- Tracks: 2

Proposed services
Preceding station	Tri-Rail	Following station
Atlantic Avenue toward Fort Lauderdale	Green Line (proposed)	Gregory Road toward Toney Penna

Lake Avenue is a proposed Tri-Rail Coastal Link Green Line station in Lake Worth, Florida, United States. The station is slated for construction south of Lake Avenue between South F Street and South G Street.
