= Atlantic Avenue station (Tri-Rail) =

Railway station in Delray Beach, Florida

Atlantic Avenue

General information
- Location: Atlantic Avenue & Northeast 3rd Avenue; Delray Beach, Florida
- Line: Florida East Coast Railway
- Tracks: 2

Proposed services
Preceding station	Tri-Rail	Following station
Northeast 2nd Street toward Fort Lauderdale	Green Line (proposed)	Lake Avenue toward Toney Penna

Atlantic Avenue is a proposed Tri-Rail Coastal Link Green Line station in Delray Beach, Florida. The station is slated for construction on the north side of Atlantic Avenue (SR 806) between Northeast 2nd Avenue and Northeast 3rd Avenue, just west of Federal Highway (US 1).
