= Atlantic Boulevard =

Atlantic Boulevard may refer to:

- Atlantic Boulevard (Jacksonville), consisting of parts of U.S. Route 90 and Florida State Road 10
- Atlantic Boulevard (Los Angeles County)
- Atlantic Boulevard (Broward County), which carries County Road 814 and Florida State Road 814

== See also ==
- Atlantic Avenue (disambiguation)
