= Florida State Road 882 =

State highway in Florida, United States

State Road 882
- Forest Hill Boulevard

Route information
- Maintained by FDOT
- Length: 9.233 mi (14.859 km)

Major junctions
- West end: US 441 in Wellington
- I-95 in West Palm Beach
- East end: US 1 in West Palm Beach

Location
- Country: United States
- State: Florida
- Counties: Palm Beach

Highway system
- Florida State Highway System; Interstate; US; State; Former; Pre‑1945; Toll; Scenic
← SR 880	→ SR 884

State Road 882 (SR 882), locally known as Forest Hill Boulevard, is a 9.233-mile-long (14.859 km) east–west highway serving central Palm Beach County, Florida. Its western terminus is at an intersection of US 441-SR 7 in Wellington, Florida; and its eastern terminus is at an intersection with South Dixie Highway (U.S.1/SR 805 in West Palm Beach, Florida. SR 882 also serves as a primary commuter road for Greenacres, Palm Springs, Lake Clarke Shores, and West Palm Beach.

== Route description ==
Forest Hill Boulevard begins in at an intersection of U.S. Route 441/State Road 7. The Mall at Wellington Green is located there, with SR 882 taking Forest Hill Boulevard east through mostly residential areas for the first section of the road. East of Palm Beach Central High School, the road crosses over Florida's Turnpike without an interchange, and enters Okeeheelee Park in Greenacres. After leaving the park, the road serves as the feeder road for several gated communities, and becomes a mix of commercial and residential areas as it intersects Jog Road and SR 809 (Military Trail) before leaving Greenacres and entering Palm Springs. Continuing east, SR 882 intersects SR 807 (Congress Avenue). After this intersection, the road enters West Palm Beach, with Forest Hill Boulevard jogging slightly north as it heads towards the interchange with Interstate 95, with the road becoming almost purely residential following the interchange. Just east of a railroad crossing, State Road 882 terminates at US 1/SR 805.

Forest Hill Boulevard extends beyond the termini of SR 882 in both directions. To the west, it curves northward as it crosses Wellington, ending at an intersection with US 441-98-SR 80 at the Royal Palm Beach city limits. To the east of US 1, Forest Hill Boulevard intersects with SR 5 (formerly northbound US 1) three blocks east of US 1 and continues to Flagler Drive at the edge of Lake Worth.

== History ==
Originally, SR 882 was only 1.1-mile-long (1.8 km), existing only between Interstate 95 (SR 9) and US 1 north (current SR 5). In the mid-1970s, Florida Department of Transportation designated it as a secondary state road, which, in most cases, would set into motion a sequence of events that would result in the transferral of Forest Hill Boulevard from State maintenance to Palm Beach County maintenance. At the time, FDOT "downgraded" all or part of dozens of State Roads throughout the state, but southern Florida was particularly affected.

Unlike most "tagged" State Roads, then-SR S-882 did not revert to county control in the 1980s. Instead, its status was upgraded (the "S" was dropped) and the designation was extended 8.4 miles (13.5 km) to the west, to its present terminus location.

On September 29, 2010, the section of SR 882 between US 1 and SR 5 was deleted from state databases and given to city control, placing the current eastern terminus of SR 882 at US 1, as opposed to SR 5.

== Major intersections ==
The entire route is in Palm Beach County.

Location	mi	km	Destinations	Notes
Wellington	0.000	0.000	US 441 (SR 7) – Fairgrounds	Road continues west without designation
Greenacres	3.597	5.789	Jog Road	
Palm Springs	5.652	9.096	SR 809 (Military Trail)	
Palm Springs	7.153	11.512	SR 807 (Congress Avenue)	
West Palm Beach	8.38	13.49	I-95 – West Palm Beach, Miami	Exit 66 on I-95
West Palm Beach	9.233	14.859	US 1 (Dixie Highway)	
1.000 mi = 1.609 km; 1.000 km = 0.621 mi
