= Yamato Road =

Highway in Florida

Yamato Road
- North 51st Street; State Road 794 and County Road 794
- SR 794 in red, CR 794 in blue, municipal portion in grey

Route information
- Maintained by FDOT and Palm Beach E&PW
- Length: 9.380 mi (15.096 km) 2.78 mi (4.47 km) as SR 794; 5.1 mi (8.21 km) as CR 794

Major junctions
- West end: Coral Ridge Drive near Boca Raton
- US 441 / SR 7 near Boca Raton; I-95 in Boca Raton
- East end: US 1 in Boca Raton

Location
- Country: United States
- State: Florida
- County: Palm Beach

Highway system
- Florida State Highway System; Interstate; US; State; Former; Pre‑1945; Toll; Scenic
| ← SR 789 | → SR 800 |

Yamato Road is a 9.38-mile (15.10 km) east–west arterial boulevard in incorporated and unincorporated Boca Raton, Florida. A portion of the road in incorporated Boca Raton is designated State Road 794 (SR 794), while most of the road to the west is designated, but not signed, as County Road 794. Yamato is located on North 51st Street in the Boca Raton street numbering grid.

SR 794 begins at an intersection with Military Trail (CR 809, formerly SR 809) near the T-Rex Technology Center of Boca Raton and Broken Sound Golf Course; the eastern terminus is an intersection with Federal Highway (U.S. Route 1 and unsigned State Road 5) just east of Dixie Highway. SR 794 is primarily an access road between Interstate 95 (unsigned State Road 9) and US 1. Within 1-mile (1.6 km) of its termini are Lynn University and Boca Raton Airport. CR 794 extends west from Military Trail to U.S. Route 441 in a residential development just west of Boca Raton, while Yamato Road itself continues west without designation for an additional 1.5 miles (2.41 km).

The entirety of Yamato Road has a posted speed limit of 45 miles per hour (72 km/h).

== Route description ==
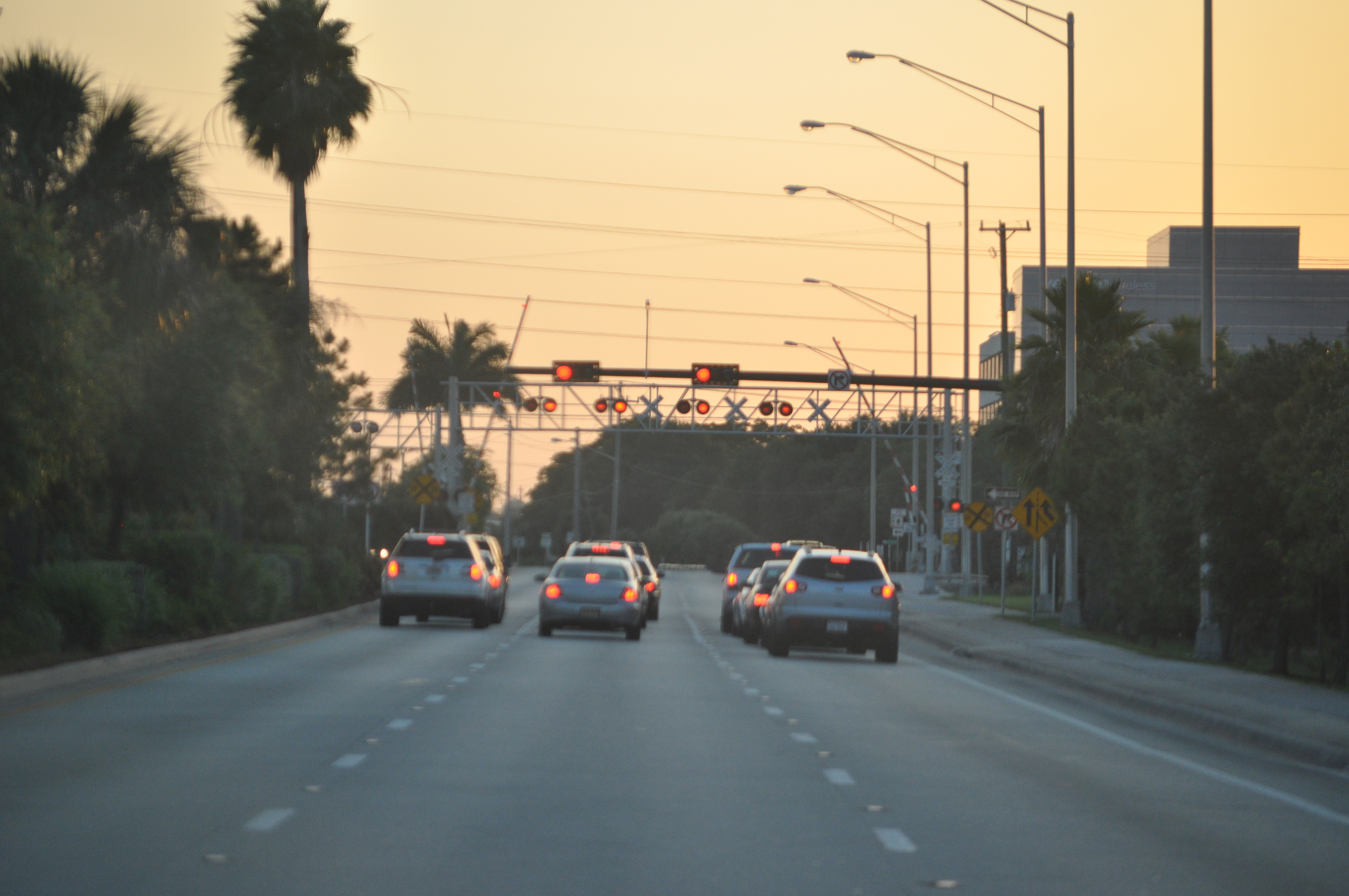
SR 794 just west of I-95 with the Tri-Rail crossing going down

=== West of US 441 ===
West of US 441, Yamato Road exists for approximately 1.5 miles (2.41 km) without state or county designation. Its western terminus is a traffic circle with Coral Ridge Drive, providing access to the Saturnia retirement community and Sunrise Park Elementary School. This section of Yamato also provides access to Burt Aaronson South County Regional Park.

=== CR 794 ===
CR 794 begins at an intersection between Yamato Road and US 441 / SR 7 in the former census-designated places of Whisper Walk and Hamptons at Boca Raton. It proceeds east, serving as the primary access road for the many gated communities and golf clubs in the area, and also passes over Florida's Turnpike. At an intersection with Jog Road (formerly SR 845), Yamato provides access to the Woodfield Plaza shopping center and Spanish River Community High School. CR 794 and Yamato continue east, intersecting with Saint Andrews Boulevard (a primary arterial road in Boca Raton) before transitioning to SR 794 at Military Trail.

=== SR 794 ===
SR 794 begins at the intersection of Yamato Road and Military Trail (CR 809) in the country club neighborhoods of Boca Raton. The highway heads eastward as the eight-lane arterial boulevard. SR 794 continues through the country clubs, passing to the south of Broken Sound Golf Course and to the north of the local residential developments. The road then turns to the northwest, passing the Boca Raton Tri-Rail station.

After crossing a riverbank, SR 794 continues eastward as an eight-lane arterial, which crosses the Tri-Rail line before intersecting with a ramp to SR 800 (Spanish River Blvd), a road which is only directly accessible from Yamato Road through the eastbound direction. This ramp merges with a ramp originating from an Exit 48A on I-95, which takes drivers directly to SR 800. The road then immediately reaches an interchange with I-95. The highway continues eastward as a six-lane arterial into the interchange, crossing under the interstate and entering a densely populated part of Boca Raton. The road becomes surrounded by a mix of commercial and residential developments before crossing a local freight railroad and SR 811 (Dixie Highway). Continuing eastward, SR 794 goes for a short distance further into Boca Raton, ending at an intersection with US 1 (and unsigned SR 5).

== Major intersections ==
The entire route is in Palm Beach County.

| Location | mi | km | Destinations | Notes |
|---|---|---|---|---|
| | 0.00 | 0.00 | Coral Ridge Drive | Traffic circle |
| | 1.50 | 2.41 | US 441 (SR 7) | Western terminus of CR 794 |
| Boca Raton | 4.70 | 7.56 | Jog Road | Former SR 845 |
| Boca Raton | 6.60 0.000 | 10.62 0.000 | Military Trail (CR 809) – Lynn University | Former SR 809; transition from CR 794 to SR 794 |
| Boca Raton | 1.183 | 1.904 | Congress Avenue north (CR 807) | Southern terminus of CR 807 (former SR 807) |
| Boca Raton | 1.750 | 2.816 | I-95 / Spanish River Boulevard / FAU Boulevard – West Palm Beach, Miami | Exit 48B on I-95; no westbound exit to Spanish River & FAU Boulevards |
| Boca Raton | 2.547 | 4.099 | Dixie Highway | |
| Boca Raton | 2.780 | 4.474 | US 1 (Federal Highway) | Eastern terminus of SR 794 |
1.000 mi = 1.609 km; 1.000 km = 0.621 mi: Incomplete access; Route transition

== See also ==
- Yamato Colony, Florida
