= Spanish River Boulevard =

State highway in Boca Raton, Florida, United States

Spanish River Boulevard
- State Road 800
- SR 800 in red, former SR 800 in grey

Route information
- Maintained by FDOT and the City of Boca Raton
- Length: 3.374 mi (5.430 km) 0.574 miles (0.92 km) as SR 800

Major junctions
- West end: CR 809 in Boca Raton
- I-95 in Boca Raton; US 1 in Boca Raton
- East end: SR A1A in Boca Raton

Location
- Country: United States
- State: Florida
- Counties: Palm Beach

Highway system
- Florida State Highway System; Interstate; US; State; Former; Pre‑1945; Toll; Scenic
← SR 794	→ SR 802

Spanish River Boulevard is a short east–west highway in Boca Raton, Palm Beach County, Florida. The eastern 0.5 miles (0.80 km) is signed as State Road 800 (SR 800), though the western segment was formerly SR 800 as well. The western terminus of the boulevard is at Military Trail (County Road 809 or CR 809), but the state route does not begin until Federal Highway (U.S. Route 1 or US 1). Both the state route and the road itself terminate at Ocean Boulevard (SR A1A) near the Atlantic Ocean shoreline at the northeastern corner of Spanish River Park, near Highland Beach.

Spanish River Boulevard provides the only access to SR A1A and the Boca Raton beaches in northern Boca Raton. It is one of only three beach access roads within the Boca Raton city limits, the other two being Palmetto Park Road (CR 798) and Camino Real.

SR 800 is one of two state highways in the x00 series that does not follow the numbering system; the other is SR 300, the designation for the St. George Island Bridge. All other x00 routes are major cross-state diagonals.

== Route description ==
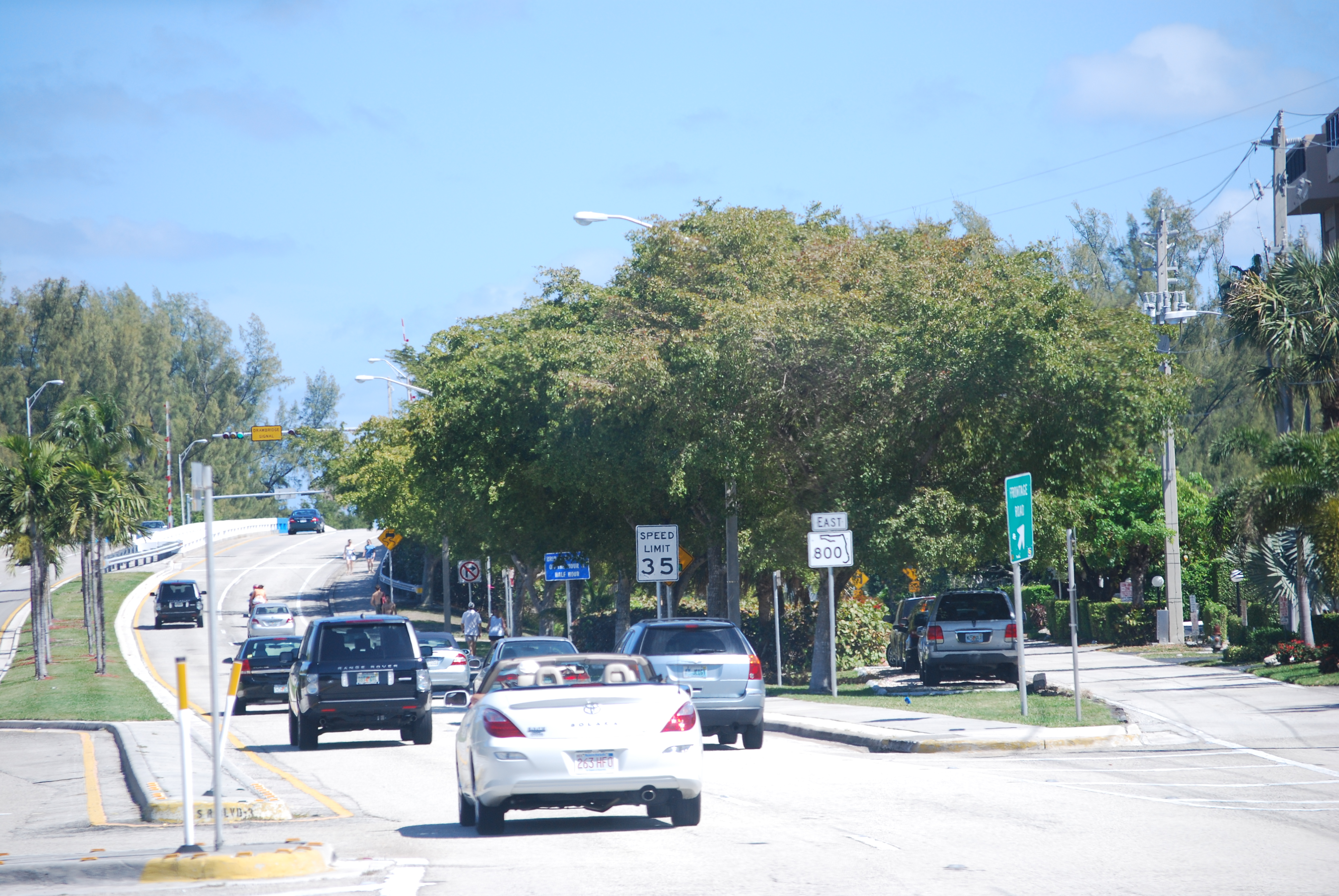
SR 800 heading east towards SR A1A in Boca Raton

=== West of US 1 ===
The western terminus of Spanish River Boulevard is at its intersection with Military Trail (CR 809), in the Lynn University area of Boca Raton, Florida. The route progresses eastward as a four-lane boulevard through several governmental, commercial and residential developments. The highway narrows briefly to three lanes (two westbound and one eastbound) as it crosses over Interstate 95 (I-95) and the Tri-Rail tracks.

Spanish River Boulevard widens back to four lanes after the overpass, where it serves as the northern boundary of the Boca Raton Airport, as it passes some large hangars and intersects with Airport Road. From there, the highway passes along the northern edge of Florida Atlantic University and the Boca Raton campus of Palm Beach State College. The next junction intersects with FAU Boulevard, providing access to the campuses, as well as access to Interstate 95 (I-95). The access to Interstate 95 was completed on February 28, 2018. The same intersection is set to provide access to and from Yamato Rd (SR 794) by the end of March 2018. After the signal, the road soon enters a large condominium development along its southern side. At the intersection with Northwest 4th Avenue, Spanish River Boulevard turns to the southeast, passing several local residences.

=== SR 800 ===
SR 800 begins in downtown Boca Raton, just east of the tracks of the Florida East Coast Railway and Dixie Highway. The route passes begins near a strip mall as a four-lane boulevard and continues east from an intersection with U.S. Route 1 (Federal Highway). After leaving downtown Boca Raton, State Road 800 crosses the Intracoastal Waterway on a large four-lane drawbridge and reaches its terminus at an intersection with State Road A1A (North Ocean Boulevard) along the beachside of Boca Raton.

== Major intersections ==
The entire route is in Boca Raton, Palm Beach County.

mi	km	Destinations	Notes
0.00	0.00	Military Trail (CR 809)	Former western terminus of SR 800
1.50	2.41	To I-95 / SR 794 (Yamato Road) – West Palm Beach, Miami	Exit 48B on I-95; interchange opened in February 2018
2.50	4.02	Dixie Highway	
2.80 0.000	4.51 0.000	US 1 (Federal Highway)	Western terminus of SR 800
0.252	0.406	Frontage Road	Interchange; eastbound exit and westbound entrance
0.311– 0.403	0.501– 0.649	Bridge over the Intracoastal Waterway	
0.574	0.924	SR A1A (Ocean Boulevard) – Highland Beach	
1.000 mi = 1.609 km; 1.000 km = 0.621 mi: Incomplete access; Route transition
