= Atlantic station =

Atlantic station may refer to:

- Atlantic station (Los Angeles Metro), a light rail station in Los Angeles
- Atlantic station (Staten Island Railway), a former rapid transit station in New York City
- Atlantic Station, Atlanta, a neighborhood in Atlanta

== See also ==
- Atlantic Street station, light-rail station in Newark, New Jersey
- Atlantic Avenue (disambiguation)
