= Villages of Oriole, Florida =

- unincorporated place
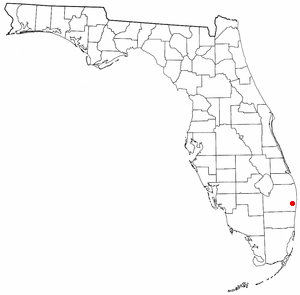
- Location of Villages of Oriole, Florida
- Coordinates: 26°27′33″N 80°9′20″W
- Country: United States
- State: Florida
- County: Palm Beach

Area
  - Total: 1.0 sq mi (2.7 km^{2})
  - Land: 1.0 sq mi (2.7 km^{2})
  - Water: 0 sq mi (0.0 km^{2})
- Elevation: 20 ft (6 m)

Population (2000)
  - Total: 4,758
  - Density: 4,637/sq mi (1,790.5/km^{2})
- Time zone: UTC-5 (Eastern (EST))
  - Summer (DST): UTC-4 (EDT)
- Area codes: 561, 728
- FIPS code: 12-74494
- GNIS feature ID: 1867222

Villages of Oriole was a former census-designated place (CDP) and current unincorporated place in Palm Beach County, Florida, United States. The population was 4,758 at the 2000 census.

== Geography ==
Villages of Oriole is located at 26°27′33″N 80°9′20″W (26.459218, -80.155569).

According to the United States Census Bureau, the CDP has a total area of 2.7 km^{2} (1.0 sq mi), all land.

== Demographics ==
At the 2000 census, there were 4,758 people, 3,072 households and 1,517 families residing in the CDP. The population density was 1,783.6 people/km^{2} (4,620 people/mi^{2}). There were 3,750 housing units at an average density of 1,405.7 units/km^{2} (3,641 units/mi^{2}). The racial makeup of the CDP was 99.33% White (98.8% were Non-Hispanic White), 0.29% African American, 0.04% Asian, 0.04% Pacific Islander, 0.11% from other races, and 0.19% from two or more races. Hispanic or Latino of any race were 0.63% of the population.

In 2000, there were 3,072 households, of which 0.2% had children under the age of 18 living with them, 47.1% were married couples living together, 1.7% had a female householder with no husband present, and 50.6% were non-families. 47.7% of all households were made up of individuals, and 45.0% had someone living alone who was 65 years of age or older. The average household size was 1.55 and the average family size was 2.04.

In 2000, 0.4% of the population were under the age of 18, 0.2% from 18 to 24, 1.5% from 25 to 44, 6.3% from 45 to 64, and 91.7% who were 65 years of age or older. The median age was 77 years. For every 100 females, there were 68.1 males. For every 100 females age 18 and over, there were 68.1 males.

In 2000, the median household income was $30,719 and the median family income was $40,884. Males had a median income of $21,083 compared with $24,297 for females. The per capita income for the CDP was $24,496. About 3.8% of families and 7.0% of the population were below the poverty line, including none of those under age 18 and 6.4% of those age 65 or over.

English was the first language for 92.70% of all residents, while Yiddish accounted for 5.90%, Italian made up 0.75%, and Hungarian was the mother tongue for 0.64% of the population.
