= HCA Florida JFK Hospital =

Coordinates: 26.598517°N 80.0919032°W

- HCA Healthcare
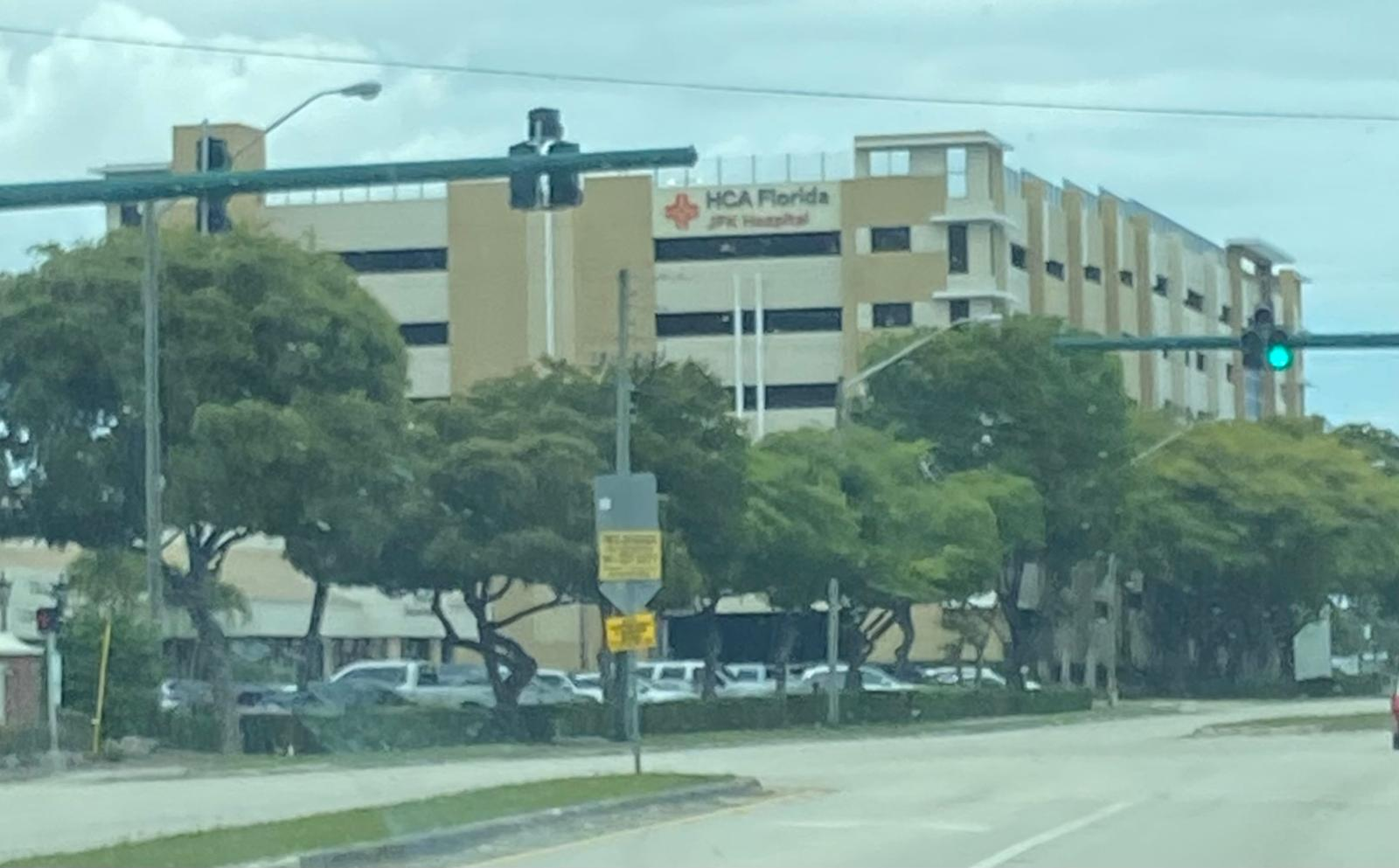

Geography
- Location: Atlantis, Florida, United States

Organization
- Care system: Private hospital
- Type: General hospital

Services
- Emergency department: Yes
- Beds: 486

History
- Former name: JFK Medical Center
- Founded: 1966

Links
- Website: http://www.jfkmc.com/
- Lists: Hospitals in Florida

The HCA Florida JFK Hospital is a 486-bed medical center in Atlantis, Florida, United States owned by HCA Healthcare. The hospital was founded in 1966 as a community hospital and was named for former U.S. president John F. Kennedy. The hospital is home to ACGME accredited residencies in internal medicine and general surgery. It has over 500 affiliated physicians, 2200 healthcare professionals, and 300 volunteers. The hospital specializes in cardiovascular care. It is a teaching hospital affiliated with the University of Miami's Miller School of Medicine.

The former West Palm Beach Hospital became JFK North Medical Center. It specializes in psychiatric and orthopedic care.

== Sources ==
- JFK Medical Center at U.S. News & World Report's "Best Hospitals".
