= Florida State Road 804 =

State highway in Florida, United States

State Road 804

Route information
- Maintained by FDOT
- Length: 9.870 mi (15.884 km)
- Existed: 1945 renumbering (definition)–present

Major junctions
- West end: US 441 near Boynton Beach
- Florida's Turnpike near Boynton Beach; I-95 in Boynton Beach; US 1 in Boynton Beach
- East end: SR A1A in Ocean Ridge

Location
- Country: United States
- State: Florida
- Counties: Palm Beach

Highway system
- Florida State Highway System; Interstate; US; State; Former; Pre‑1945; Toll; Scenic
← SR 802	→ SR 805

State Road 804 (SR 804) is a 9.843-mile-long (15.841 km) east–west highway serving as a major commercial and commuter road through Boynton Beach in southern Palm Beach County, Florida. It is known locally and signed as Boynton Beach Boulevard for nearly all of its route, with the exception of when the road becomes concurrent with U.S. Route 1 (US 1 southward for two blocks, then continues along Ocean Avenue in downtown Boynton Beach to its eastern terminus at SR A1A. The western terminus of SR 804 is at the junction of US 441 / SR 7, close to the eastern boundary of the Loxahatchee National Wildlife Refuge and the historic northern boundary of The Everglades. Boynton Beach Boulevard adheres to Northwest 2nd Avenue in the Boynton Beach street numbering grid.

== Route description ==
State Road 804's western terminus is in unincorporated Boynton Beach at the intersection of US 441–SR 7, just north of the eastern boundary of the Loxahatchee National Wildlife Refuge and the historic northern boundary of The Everglades. West of US 441, Boynton Beach Boulevard continues westbound as 100th Street South for 0.5 miles (0.80 km) without a state road designation through several farms before terminating at a dead end. State Road 804 then heads east away from US 441 through local farms, with newer developments east of Lyons Road. The speed limit here, and on almost all of Boynton Beach Boulevard outside of the incorporated city, is 45 miles per hour (72 km/h). Two miles east of the western terminus, SR 804 has an interchange with Florida's Turnpike. East of the turnpike, Boynton Beach Boulevard enters into some residential areas, intersecting Jog Road, followed by Military Trail (formerly SR 809 and now CR 809), where soon afterwards, it has access to the Quail Ridge Country Club to the south. East of Knuth Road, Boynton Beach Boulevard enters incorporated Boynton Beach and becomes more commercial, with the Boynton Beach Mall a few blocks to the north, and SR 804 intersecting with Congress Avenue, which like Military Trail is a state-turned-county road. It continues east, now with a speed limit of 40 miles per hour (64 km/h), heading for an interchange with Interstate 95 (I-95), entering downtown Boynton Beach east of the interchange, with the road ceasing to be a divided road east of NW 4th Street.

Now with a speed limit of 35 miles per hour (56 km/h), the road next intersects Seacrest Boulevard, the baseline road that divides the city's east and west address, and continues east towards US 1. It crosses the Florida East Coast Railway tracks that carry the Brightline service, also passing the site of a proposed Tri-Rail station south of the boulevard. At the intersection with US 1, SR 804 leaves Boynton Beach Boulevard proper for US 1 (Federal Highway, and the hidden SR 5), where it continues south for two blocks. SR 804 then turns left (east) and follows Ocean Avenue in downtown Boynton Beach, along portions of the Ocean Avenue Historic District, with a speed limit of 30 miles per hour (48 km/h). The road also has access to the revitalized Boynton Harbor Marina to the north before crossing a drawbridge over the Intracoastal Waterway to the eastern terminus at SR A1A (Ocean Boulevard), which is just outside the Boynton Beach city limits in Ocean Ridge, just south of Boynton Beach's Oceanfront Park and Boynton Beach's government offices.

== History ==
The original designation of Boynton Beach Boulevard was State Road 195. The 1945 State Road renumbering changed that designation to the current State Road 804. The road originally began as Boynton West Road at State Road 7, about 1/2 mile south of the current western terminus, connecting the farms in that area to the town of Boynton Beach to the east. Boynton West Road headed east to Military Trail at the eastern end of a sugarcane field, where the road would follow Military Trail for 1/2 mile northbound, with the field to the west. The road would continue east, and then south to Boynton West Shellrock Road (now Old Boynton Road), where the road would head east to its original eastern terminus at Dixie Highway (now Federal Highway, US 1, and SR 5) and NW 2nd Avenue.

== Major intersections ==
The entire route is in Palm Beach County.

Location	mi	km	Destinations	Notes
	0.000	0.000	US 441 (SR 7)	Continues west to a dead-end
	2.030	3.267	Florida's Turnpike – Orlando, Miami	Exit 86 on Turnpike
	3.600	5.794	Jog Road	
	5.113	8.229	CR 809 (Military Trail)	Former SR 809
Boynton Beach	7.125	11.467	Congress Avenue (CR 807)	Former SR 807
Boynton Beach	7.814	12.575	Old Boynton Road west	Former alignment of SR 804
Boynton Beach	8.210	13.213	I-95 – West Palm Beach, Miami	Exit 57 on I-95
Boynton Beach	9.127	14.688	US 1 north (Federal Highway)	Western terminus of concurrency with US 1
Boynton Beach	9.262	14.906	US 1 south (Federal Highway)	Eastern terminus of concurrency with US 1
Intracoastal Waterway	9.501– 9.567	15.290– 15.397	Ocean Avenue Bridge	
Ocean Ridge	9.870	15.884	SR A1A (Ocean Boulevard)	
1.000 mi = 1.609 km; 1.000 km = 0.621 mi: Concurrency terminus; Tolled
