= High Point, Palm Beach County, Florida =

High Point, Florida
- unincorporated place
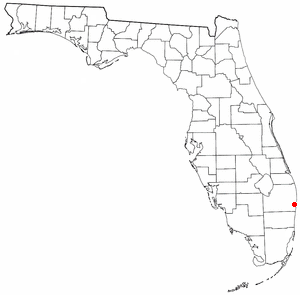
- Location of High Point, Florida
- Coordinates: 26.468118°N 80.129152°W
- Country: United States
- State: Florida
- County: Palm Beach

Area
  - Land: 0.58 sq mi (1.5 km^{2})

Population (2000)
  - Total: 2,191
- Time zone: UTC-5 (Eastern (EST))
  - Summer (DST): UTC-4 (EDT)
- ZIP code: 33484
- Area codes: 561, 728
- GNIS feature ID: 294872

High Point was a former census-designated place (CDP) and current unincorporated place in Palm Beach County, Florida, United States. The population was 2,191 at the 2000 census. The CDP was removed from the 2010 census.

== Geography ==
High Point is located at 26°28′5″N 80°7′45″W (26.468118, -80.129152).

According to the United States Census Bureau, the CDP has a total area of 1.5 km^{2} (0.58 sq mi), all land.

== Demographics ==
Historical population
Census	Pop.	Note	%±
1990	2,288		—
2000	2,191		−4.2%

As of the census of 2000, there were 2,191 people, 1,298 households, and 681 families residing in the CDP. The population density was 1,433.8 people/km^{2} (3,714 people/mi^{2}). There were 1,548 housing units at an average density of 1,013.0 units/km^{2} (2,624 units/mi^{2}). The racial makeup of the CDP was 91.92% White, 6.94% African American, 0.23% Asian, 0.05% Pacific Islander, 0.05% from other races, and 0.82% from two or more races. Hispanic or Latino of any race were 1.92% of the population.

In 2000, there were 1,298 households, out of which 2.5% had children under the age of 18 living with them, 47.4% were married couples living together, 3.6% had a female householder with no husband present, and 47.5% were non-families. 43.9% of all households were made up of individuals, and 36.4% had someone living alone who was 65 years of age or older. The average household size was 1.69 and the average family size was 2.21.

In 2000, in the former CDP, the population was spread out, with 3.2% under the age of 18, 2.1% from 18 to 24, 7.3% from 25 to 44, 12.3% from 45 to 64, and 75.1% who were 65 years of age or older. The median age was 75 years. For every 100 females, there were 76.4 males. For every 100 females age 18 and over, there were 76.9 males.

In 2000, the median income for a household in the CDP was $30,530, and the median income for a family was $36,151. Males had a median income of $21,750 versus $32,031 for females. The per capita income for the CDP was $21,270. About 3.9% of families and 6.6% of the population were below the poverty line, including none of those under age 18 and 5.9% of those age 65 or over.

As of 2000, English was the first language for 97.70% of all residents, while Yiddish was the mother tongue for 2.29% of the population.
