= WPXP-TV =

Television station in Lake Worth, Florida

- Lake Worth–West Palm Beach, Florida; United States
- City: Lake Worth, Florida
- Channels: Digital: 36 (UHF); Virtual: 67

Programming
- Affiliations: 67.1: Ion Television; for others, see § Subchannels

Ownership
- Owner: Inyo Broadcast Holdings; (Inyo Broadcast Licenses LLC)

History
- First air date: January 5, 1998
- Former call signs: WHBI (unbuilt, 1987–1997)
- Former channel numbers: Analog: 67 (UHF, 1998–2009)
- Former affiliations: inTV (January–August 1998)
- Call sign meaning: Pax West Palm Beach

Technical information
- Licensing authority: FCC
- Facility ID: 27290
- ERP: 1,000 kW
- HAAT: 385 m (1,263 ft)
- Transmitter coordinates: 26°35′21.2″N 80°12′42.8″W

Links
- Public license information: Public file; LMS
- Website: iontelevision.com

WPXP-TV (channel 67) is a television station licensed to Lake Worth, Florida, United States, serving the West Palm Beach area as an affiliate of Ion Television. Owned by Inyo Broadcast Holdings, the station maintains offices on Banyan Boulevard in West Palm Beach, while its transmitter is located near Greenacres, Florida.

Until 2021, as the Ion owned-and-operated station for West Palm Beach, where Ion's headquarters are located, WPXP was considered one of the network's flagship stations, though it has never originated any content for the national network, either as Pax TV, i: Independent Television, or Ion. However, Inyo Broadcast Holdings, the current owner of WPXP, is planning to be sold to the E. W. Scripps Company, who currently owns WPTV-TV and WHDT, and operates WFLX-TV under a shared services agreement with Gray Media.

== History ==
The first application for the station was made in 1984, and the WHBI callsign was assigned in June 1987 until the end of 1997. In January 1998, it finally went on-air after more than a decade of modified and expired construction permits, and took its present call letters upon joining the fledgling Pax TV network. All applications prior to 2003 were by Hispanic Broadcasting, Inc., before becoming Paxson West Palm Beach License, Inc. (a holding company, which is common in broadcasting), though there was no application listed to assign the station to another licensee.

WPXP and then-sister station WPXM-TV carried Florida Marlins baseball games from 2002 to 2005.

== Technical information ==
=== Subchannels ===
The station's signal is multiplexed:

Subchannels of WPXP-TV
Subchannel	Res.	Short name	Programming
67.1	720p	ION	Ion Television
67.2	480i	Mystery	Ion Mystery
67.3	480i	DEFY	Defy
67.4	480i	Grit	Grit
67.5	480i	BUSTED	Busted
67.6	480i	GameSho	Game Show Central
67.7	480i	QVC365	QVC 365
67.8	480i	HSN	HSN
67.9	480i	QVC	QVC

=== Analog-to-digital conversion ===
WPXP-TV ended regular programming on its analog signal, over UHF channel 67, on June 12, 2009, the official date on which full-power television stations in the United States transitioned from analog to digital broadcasts under federal mandate (sister station WPXM opted to do so on the original transition date of February 17). The station's digital signal remained on its pre-transition UHF channel 36, using virtual channel 67.

WPXP's digital signal has a much greater broadcast range than its now-defunct channel 67 analog signal. The analog transmitter was located within the western part of the city of West Palm Beach, and had a service contour that reached as far north as Port St. Lucie and as far south as Pompano Beach (immediately north of Fort Lauderdale). The digital transmitter is west-southwest of Lake Worth, and its service contour reaches as far north as Okeechobee and Fort Pierce, and far south as Kendale Lakes, including all of Palm Beach, Broward, and Martin counties; and northeast Miami-Dade, eastern Hendry, and southern/central St. Lucie counties.
