= Westgate, Florida =

- CDP
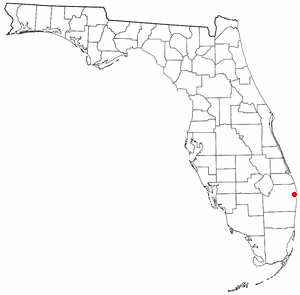
- Location of Westgate, Florida
- Coordinates: 26°41′58″N 80°05′56″W
- Country: United States
- State: Florida
- County: Palm Beach

Area
  - Total: 1.52 sq mi (3.93 km^{2})
  - Land: 1.52 sq mi (3.93 km^{2})
  - Water: 0 sq mi (0.00 km^{2})
- Elevation: 13 ft (4.0 m)

Population (2020)
  - Total: 8,435
  - Density: 5,553.3/sq mi (2,144.13/km^{2})
- Time zone: UTC-5 (Eastern (EST))
  - Summer (DST): UTC-4 (EDT)
- ZIP code: 33409
- Area codes: 561, 728
- FIPS code: 12-76305
- GNIS ID: 2628539

Westgate is an unincorporated census-designated place (CDP) in Palm Beach County, Florida, United States. Prior to the 2010 US census, the CDP was listed as Westgate-Belvedere Homes. It is part of the Miami metropolitan area of South Florida. The population was 8,435 at the 2020 census.

== Geography ==
According to the United States Census Bureau, the community has a total area of 1.5 square miles (3.9 km^{2}), all land.

== Demographics ==
Historical population
Census	Pop.	Note	%±
1990	6,880		—
2000	8,134		18.2%
2010	7,975		−2.0%
2020	8,435		5.8%
As Westgate-Belvedere Homes (1990-2000); As Westgate (2010-now)

A community named Westgate-Belvedere Homes CDP was listed as a census designated place in the 1990 U.S. census. The CDP was deleted and part was used to form the current Westgate CDP.

=== Racial and ethnic composition ===
Westgate CDP, Florida – Racial and ethnic composition Note: the US Census treats Hispanic/Latino as an ethnic category. This table excludes Latinos from the racial categories and assigns them to a separate category. Hispanics/Latinos may be of any race.
Race / Ethnicity (NH = Non-Hispanic)	Pop 2000	Pop 2010	Pop 2020	% 2000	% 2010	% 2020
White alone (NH)	3,347	1,441	938	41.15%	18.07%	11.12%
Black or African American alone (NH)	1,861	2,900	2,328	22.88%	36.36%	27.60%
Native American or Alaska Native alone (NH)	29	16	9	0.36%	0.20%	0.11%
Asian alone (NH)	73	132	142	0.90%	1.66%	1.68%
Native Hawaiian or Pacific Islander alone (NH)	5	8	4	0.06%	0.10%	0.05%
Other race alone (NH)	13	19	61	0.16%	0.24%	0.72%
Mixed race or Multiracial (NH)	173	138	173	2.13%	1.73%	2.05%
Hispanic or Latino (any race)	2,633	3,321	4,780	32.37%	41.64%	56.67%
Total	8,134	7,975	8,435	100.00%	100.00%	100.00%

=== 2020 census ===
As of the 2020 census, Westgate had a population of 8,435. The median age was 31.2 years. 29.4% of residents were under the age of 18 and 9.0% were 65 years of age or older. For every 100 females, there were 101.0 males, and for every 100 females age 18 and over, there were 101.5 males.

100.0% of residents lived in urban areas, while 0.0% lived in rural areas.

There were 2,397 households in Westgate, of which 48.7% had children under the age of 18 living in them. Of all households, 40.3% were married-couple households, 20.2% were households with a male householder and no spouse or partner present, and 30.0% were households with a female householder and no spouse or partner present. About 14.9% of all households were made up of individuals and 6.5% had someone living alone who was 65 years of age or older.

There were 2,513 housing units, of which 4.6% were vacant. The homeowner vacancy rate was 1.1% and the rental vacancy rate was 3.8%.

=== Demographic estimates ===
According to the 2020 American Community Survey 5-year estimates, there were 1,818 families residing in the CDP.

=== 2010 census ===
As of the 2010 United States census, there were 7,975 people, 2,050 households, and 1,457 families residing in the CDP.

=== 2000 census ===
As of the census of 2000, there were 8,134 people, 2,774 households, and 1,908 families residing in the community. The population density was 1,524.5/km^{2} (3,944.7/mi^{2}). There were 3,110 housing units at an average density of 582.9/km^{2} (1,508.3/mi^{2}). The racial makeup of the community was 62.10% White (41.2% were Non-Hispanic White), 24.05% African American, 0.61% Native American, 0.90% Asian, 0.07% Pacific Islander, 8.11% from other races, and 4.16% from two or more races. Hispanic or Latino of any race were 32.37% of the population.

As of 2000, there were 2,774 households, out of which 37.4% had children under the age of 18 living with them, 41.4% were married couples living together, 19.6% had a female householder with no husband present, and 31.2% were non-families. 22.8% of all households were made up of individuals, and 7.1% had someone living alone who was 65 years of age or older. The average household size was 2.93 and the average family size was 3.42.

In 2000, the population was spread out, with 30.8% under the age of 18, 10.8% from 18 to 24, 31.5% from 25 to 44, 18.0% from 45 to 64, and 8.8% who were 65 years of age or older. The median age was 30 years. For every 100 females, there were 101.6 males. For every 100 females age 18 and over, there were 102.0 males.

In 2000, the median income for a household in the community was $29,659, and the median income for a family was $33,836. Males had a median income of $24,517 versus $19,477 for females. The per capita income for the community was $12,382. About 16.4% of families and 20.8% of the population were below the poverty line, including 26.6% of those under age 18 and 10.8% of those age 65 or over.

As of 2000, English was the first language for 61.25% of all residents, while Spanish accounted for 31.26%, French Creole made up 6.23%, and French was the mother tongue for 1.24% of the population.
