= Atlantis, Florida =

- City
- City of Atlantis
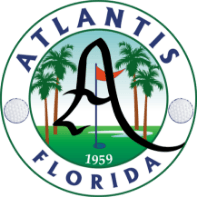
- Seal

- Location of Atlantis in Palm Beach County, Florida.
- Coordinates: 26°35′46″N 80°06′11″W
- Country: United States
- State: Florida
- County: Palm Beach
- Founded (Mulbery Farms): 1958
- Incorporated (City of Atlantis): June 19, 1959

Government
  - Type: Council-Manager
  - Mayor: Keller Lanahan
  - Vice Mayor: Guy Motzer
  - Councilors: Allan Kaulbach, Derek Cooper, and Michael LaCoursiere
  - City Manager: Brian R. Moree
  - City Clerk: Kristen Puhalainen

Area
  - Total: 1.40 sq mi (3.63 km^{2})
  - Land: 1.36 sq mi (3.53 km^{2})
  - Water: 0.039 sq mi (0.10 km^{2})
- Elevation: 16 ft (4.9 m)

Population (2020)
  - Total: 2,142
  - Density: 1,572.1/sq mi (607.01/km^{2})
- Time zone: UTC-5 (Eastern (EST))
  - Summer (DST): UTC-4 (EDT)
- ZIP code: 33462
- Area codes: 561, 728
- FIPS code: 12-02500
- GNIS feature ID: 2403128
- Website: https://www.atlantisfl.gov/

Atlantis is a city in Palm Beach County, Florida, United States. It is part of the Miami metropolitan area of South Florida. As of the 2020 census, the city had a population of 2,142.

== History ==
The modern history of what became known as the city of Atlantis originates in a ranch called Mulberry Farms, owned by Philip D. Lewis, a former Florida state senator. Lewis's Mission Company raised Brahman cattle on the land. In 1958, real estate developers Nathan Hunt and Paul Kintz purchased the land, which was platted and began the construction of what became a gated golf and country club community. The residential development, combined with a small amount of adjacent land for commercial use, was incorporated on June 19, 1959. Its first council was appointed, consisting of James Kintz as mayor, Nathan Hunt as vice mayor, and councilmen Paul Kintz, Marjorie Hunt, and William Blakeslee.

== Geography ==
The City of Atlantis is located in east central Palm Beach County.

According to the United States Census Bureau, the city has a total area of 1.4 square miles (3.6 km^{2}), of which 1.4 square miles (3.6 km^{2}) is land and 0.04 square miles (0.10 km^{2}) (2.84%) is water. It 834 acres (338 ha) borders the Lake Worth Drainage (L-14) Canal on the north, Lantana Road to the south, Military Trail to the west and Congress Avenue to the east.

== Demographics ==
Historical population
Census	Pop.	Note	%±
1960	2		—
1970	425		21,150.0%
1980	1,325		211.8%
1990	1,653		24.8%
2000	2,005		21.3%
2010	2,005		0.0%
2020	2,142		6.8%
U.S. Decennial Census

=== Racial and ethnic composition ===
Atlantis racial composition (Hispanics excluded from racial categories) (NH = Non-Hispanic)
Race	Pop 2010	Pop 2020	% 2010	% 2020
White (NH)	1,770	1,766	88.28%	82.45%
Black or African American (NH)	25	47	1.25%	2.19%
Native American or Alaska Native (NH)	1	0	0.05%	0.00%
Asian (NH)	48	57	2.39%	2.66%
Pacific Islander or Native Hawaiian (NH)	0	0	0.00%	0.00%
Some other race (NH)	0	15	0.00%	0.70%
Two or more races/Multiracial (NH)	12	47	0.60%	2.19%
Hispanic or Latino (any race)	149	210	7.43%	9.80%
Total	2,005	2,142		

=== 2020 census ===
As of the 2020 census, Atlantis had a population of 2,142. The median age was 62.0 years. 12.9% of residents were under the age of 18 and 45.3% of residents were 65 years of age or older. For every 100 females there were 89.4 males, and for every 100 females age 18 and over there were 87.2 males age 18 and over.

100.0% of residents lived in urban areas, while 0.0% lived in rural areas.

There were 1,018 households in Atlantis, of which 16.2% had children under the age of 18 living in them. Of all households, 54.7% were married-couple households, 12.5% were households with a male householder and no spouse or partner present, and 27.3% were households with a female householder and no spouse or partner present. About 29.1% of all households were made up of individuals and 21.7% had someone living alone who was 65 years of age or older.

There were 1,226 housing units, of which 17.0% were vacant. The homeowner vacancy rate was 2.1% and the rental vacancy rate was 12.7%.

As of the 2020 census, there were 517 families residing in the city.

=== 2010 census ===
As of the 2010 United States census, there were 2,005 people, 898 households, and 576 families residing in the city.

=== 2000 census ===
As of the census of 2000, there were 2,005 people, 1,024 households, and 677 families residing in the city. The population density was 565.1 people/km^{2} (1,464 people/mi^{2}). There were 1,140 housing units at an average density of 321.3 units/km^{2} (832 units/mi^{2}). The racial makeup of the city was 97.11% White (94.6% were Non-Hispanic), 0.50% African American, 2.00% Asian, 0.20% from other races, and 0.20% from two or more races. Hispanic or Latino of any race were 2.59% of the population.

As of 2000, there were 1,024 households out of which 8.8% had children under the age of 18 living with them, 61.8% were married couples living together, 3.7% had a female householder with no husband present, and 33.8% were non-families. 29.7% of all households were made up of individuals and 23.0% had someone living alone who was 65 years of age or older. The average household size was 1.96 and the average family size was 2.36.

In 2000, in the city the population was spread out with 8.6% under the age of 18, 2.4% from 18 to 24, 10.8% from 25 to 44, 27.0% from 45 to 64, and 51.2% who were 65 years of age or older. The median age was 66 years. For every 100 females there were 86.7 males. For every 100 females age 18 and over, there were 86.1 males.

In 2000, the median income for a household in the city was $71,019, and the median income for a family was $82,807. Males had a median income of $38,906 versus $47,188 for females. The per capita income for the city was $47,614. About 4.8% of families and 4.0% of the population were below the poverty line, including none of those under age 18 and 3.8% of those age 65 or over.

As of 2000, speakers of English as a first language accounted for 97.94% of all residents, while Spanish was the mother tongue of 2.05% of the population.

As of 2000, Atlantis had the 126th highest percentage of Cuban residents in the US, with 1.70% of the populace. It had the sixteenth highest percentage of Syrian residents in the US, at 1.20% of the city's population, and the tenth highest percentage of Australian residents in the US, at 1.10% of its population (tied with Mad River, Ohio, Lebanon, Maine and Gilmer, Illinois).

== Economy ==
Atlantis is home to JFK Medical Center, site of the first reported case that turned out to be part of the 2001 anthrax attacks. It is the largest employer in Atlantis.
