= George Floyd protests in Florida =

2020 civil unrest after the murder of George Floyd

- Part of George Floyd protests
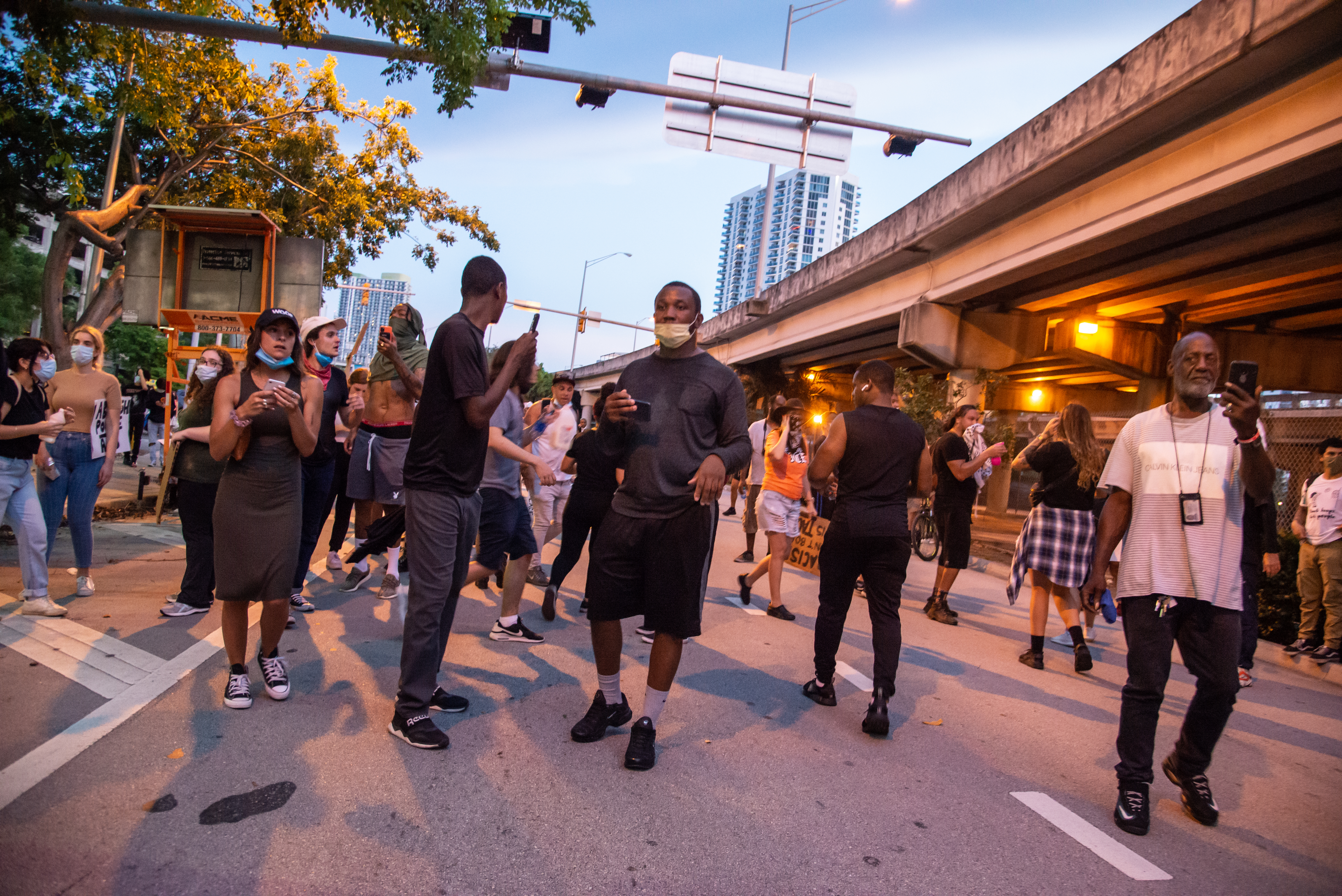
- Protest in Miami on May 30, 2020
- Date: May 28 – June 13, 2020 (2 weeks and 2 days)
- Location: Florida, United States
- Caused by: Police brutality; Institutional racism against African Americans; Reaction to the murder of George Floyd; Economic, racial, and social inequality in Florida

Cities in Florida in which a protest with about 100 or more participants was held

This is a list of protests in Florida in response to the murder of George Floyd. On May 31, 2020, Florida Governor Ron DeSantis activated the Florida National Guard, and deployed 700 soldiers to assist law enforcement agencies across the state. Additionally, DeSantis instructed the Florida Highway Patrol to mobilize 1,300 troopers to assist in policing actions.

== North and central Florida ==
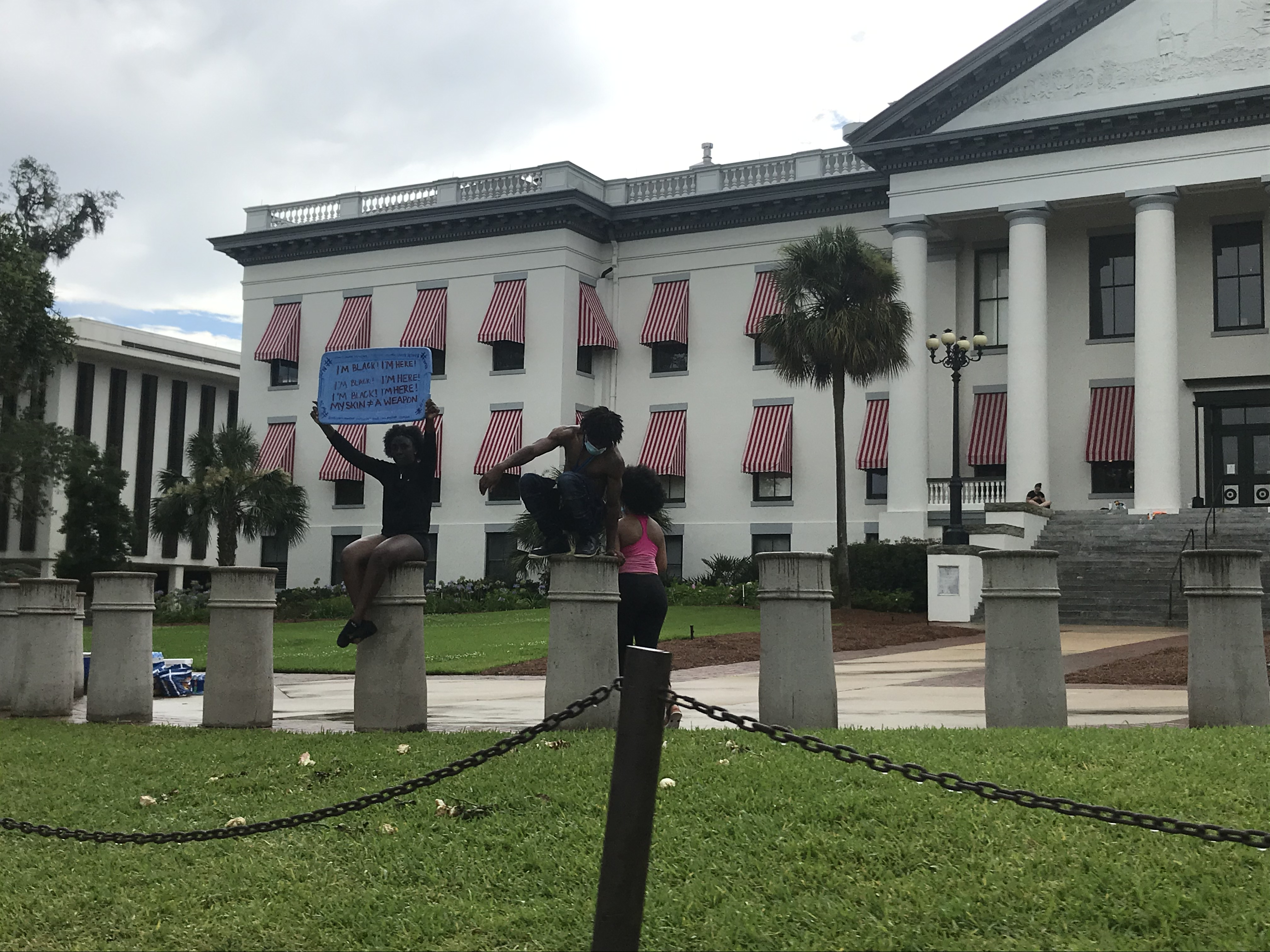
Protest in Tallahassee on June 10

- Clearwater: On June 5, a group of around 200 protesters held a sit-in event at Coachman Park, holding a moment of silence for eight minutes and forty-six seconds. Among those taking part in the protest was Naomi Ruthman, who also took part in the 1968 Chicago riots.
- Daytona Beach: On May 31, a crowd of approximately 75 people demonstrated at the corner of International Speedway Boulevard and Beach Street. Organizer Rell Black had his foot run over by a hit-and-run driver and was hospitalized, but he was not seriously injured.
- Fort Walton Beach: A group of protesters held a vigil on Sunday, May 31, listening to speeches and prayers. Another protest involved about 200 people who were walking along Eglin Parkway while being escorted by Fort Walton Beach police.
- Gainesville: On May 30, roughly 1,000 people gathered in a peaceful march downtown. Later on May 30, William Connelly drove through a crowd of protesters and pulled out a gun. The man was arrested and charged with aggravated assault.
- Jacksonville: On Saturday afternoon, May 30, about 1200 people protested downtown from about 3 to 6 p.m., with organizers emphasizing keeping the protest peaceful. However, after most of the crowd had left, a smaller contingent of about 200 people became violent, vandalizing police cars, throwing objects at officers, and slashing the neck of one officer, who was transported to a hospital. Police responded with tear gas and other non-lethal deterrents. A demonstration was also held in front of the Jacksonville Sheriff's Office, while another took place in front of Duval County Courthouse. Jacksonville mayor Lenny Curry declared a curfew from 8:00 p.m. on May 31 through 6:00 a.m. on June 1. Another peaceful protest occurred in front of Duval County Courthouse on June 2. On June 8, Jacksonville Jaguars running back Leonard Fournette led a peaceful march of about 700 people, including police officers, from City Hall to the courthouse and back to bring awareness to racism and police brutality.
- Lake City: On June 5, over 150 protesters peacefully protested in Olustee Park and marched through the town.
- Lakeland: Hundreds of people attended a protest in downtown Lakeland on May 31.
- Longboat Key: On June 4, about 20 protesters protested peacefully along Gulf of Mexico Drive.
- Navarre: On June 3, approximately 120 protesters peacefully protested in Navarre Park, along Navarre Parkway, this was followed by a candlelight vigil. On June 6, there was a peaceful protest and march that also included well over 100 people.
- Newberry: On June 13, hundreds participated in a peaceful protest in support of Black Lives Matter that began at the Martin Luther King Jr. Center. Some visitors from nearby Gainesville took part as well.
- Ocala: On multiple occasions protesters peaceful held sides along State Road 40 at the courthouse square and local businesses. There was also one incident on June 3 where a former Neo-Nazi exposed his Swastika tattoos to publicly renounce his former views.
- Orlando: Two separate protests took place on May 30, with one group of 150 protesters marching along Orange Avenue to Orlando City Hall while the other blocked Orange Blossom Trail and Florida State Road 408. Police used tear gas to disperse the latter group. The next day, another crowd of protesters walked to Orlando City Hall; the demonstration started out peacefully, but tear gas was again used to disperse protesters heading for Interstate 4. On June 6, around 3,000 protesters peacefully marched through downtown despite impending storms, which prompted many people to leave before the 8:00 p.m. curfew.
- Palm Coast: On June 3, around 200 protesters peacefully protested and marched through the town ending the protest by praying and kneeling.
- Panama City: On Saturday, May 30, a small crowd of protesters stood on the sidewalk at the east end of the Hathaway Bridge, holding up signs and receiving honks of acknowledgement from passing motorists. Another protest was held on June 20 for Juneteenth, this one drawing over 200 protesters.
- Pensacola: On Friday and Saturday, May 29 and 30, about 400 people demonstrated peacefully at the so-called Graffiti Bridge, a railroad trestle near the shore of Pensacola Bay. On Saturday, a caravan of friends, family, and supporters drove through town to honor the memory of Tymar Crawford, a black man killed in a scuffle with Pensacola police in July 2019.
- Port Orange: On May 31, over 500 peaceful protesters marched across the Dunlawton Bridge in support of George Floyd and all unarmed black civilians killed by police officers.
- Port St. Lucie: On June 6, about 200 protesters peacefully demonstrated between City Hall and the Port St. Lucie Police Department.
- Sarasota: On June 3, about 200 demonstrators marched peacefully through Downtown Sarasota in the rain. The Sarasota Police Department blocked off streets to make way for this demonstration. Before the marching began, they meet up to pray.
- St. Augustine: On June 11, around 250 protesters marched from the Bridge of Lions to the pedestrian-only St. George Street, which runs south to north from Cathedral Place to Orange Street. A number of boutiques and restaurants along this strip wore handmade signs in their windows reading 'Black Lives Matter' and other supportive phrases.
- St. Petersburg: On May 30, hundreds of people protested peacefully as they marched from City Hall to police headquarters.
- Tallahassee: Hundreds of protesters marched from Florida State University to the Old Capitol Building on May 30 before a truck drove through a group of people protesting downtown. "No one was seriously injured," according to Mayor John E. Dailey; police quickly pulled the driver from the truck and took him into custody. Demonstrations also occurred at Tallahassee Police headquarters and the Governor's Mansion.
- Tampa: Hundreds of people protested peacefully downtown on May 30, but around dusk some people began looting multiple stores on E Fowler Avenue. Others set fire to a Mobil gas station on 3003 East Busch Boulevard, but firefighters were able to quickly get the fire under control inside the store and on the roof by 9 p.m. Deputies deployed canisters of tear gas in an effort to prevent protesters from getting into the University Mall. Multiple people were arrested. Protesters threw rocks and objects at the deputies; one deputy was sent to the hospital after being hit in the head with an object by a protester near the University Mall. Around 12:40 AM a Champs store was set on fire by protesters near the University Mall. Another deputy was also injured.
- Temple Terrace: On May 30, hundreds of people protested while traversing the city, blocking traffic at points. Protesters stated that rubber bullets were used.
- Titusville: More than 350 people protested outside Titusville City Hall on June 7.
- West Melbourne: A protest was held outside of a Walmart store on June 1, drawing between 175 to 200 protesters.
- Windermere: More than 200 protesters gathered outside Derek Chauvin's summer home on May 30.

== South Florida ==
=== Palm Beach County ===
- Belle Glade: On June 6, a dozen or so protesters marched through Belle Glade neighborhoods.
- Boca Raton: On June 1, the Town Center Mall closed at 2 PM (normally 7 PM), as activists were expected to use its parking lots as a gathering point, as in fact happened. Hundreds of demonstrators, all of whom appeared to be in their late teens and early 20s, gathered along adjacent Glades Road chanting "Black Lives Matter" and "Hands up, don't shoot". They began marching about 6:30 PM. At one point police officers took a knee with protesters, causing the peaceful crowd to erupt in cheers, but the officers blocked the I-95 entrance ramp and would not let the crowd of about 200 through to march on the highway.
- Boynton Beach: On June 1, 70 protesters shut down parts of the city for a peaceful protest. The Boynton Beach Police Department followed behind the marching group to provide security and safety.
- Delray Beach: On June 3, a crowd of 250 – 300 marched peacefully from Pompey Park to City Hall. Some officers of the Delray Beach Police marched with the protesters and kneeled to show support. At City Hall there was a series of speakers, including Police Chief Javaro Sims. The event was named "We Can't Breathe".
- Lake Worth Beach: On May 30, a peaceful protest of a few hundred people took place throughout. Lake Worth by the City Hall. The gathering was peaceful for the exception of an American flag being ripped down from a flagpole.
- Palm Beach (town): On May 31, the Palm Beach Police Department issued warnings to residents as the protesters moved around in the area, and Mar-A-Lago, the President's retreat, was placed in shutdown. On June 2, the town and the Palm Beach Civic Association put out a statement that they have "been made aware of a possible planned demonstration today at Town Hall at 3 p.m. It is unknown at this time if the event will occur, or what attendance may be, but the Department is monitoring the situation.” A lone 80-year-old woman was the only protester in attendance at the scheduled time.
- West Palm Beach: Several hundred protesters gathered in downtown West Palm Beach early Sunday evening May 31. The protest eventually turned into a march by 6:30 PM that shut down I-95 in both directions, and were briefly joined by law enforcement agencies. By 7:45 PM, most demonstrators were off the interstate highway, which reopened at 8:25 PM. Also on May 31, West Palm Beach Police engaged in a tense standoff with protesters in the downtown area. A curfew was placed for 9 PM to 6 AM in order to disperse the crowds by 9:30 PM. After this, crowds began to vandalize the Palm Beach County courthouse and stores in the Palm Beach Outlets, resulting in the destruction of a Geek Squad van via arson; six arrests were made, three were from West Palm Beach, one from Lake Worth Beach, and one from Deerfield Beach. On social media, people have stated that the gathering turned violent when the 9 PM curfew was enacted at 8:56 PM, four minutes prior to its enforcement. At 11 PM, parts of Palm Beach and West Palm Beach remained closed.

=== Broward County ===
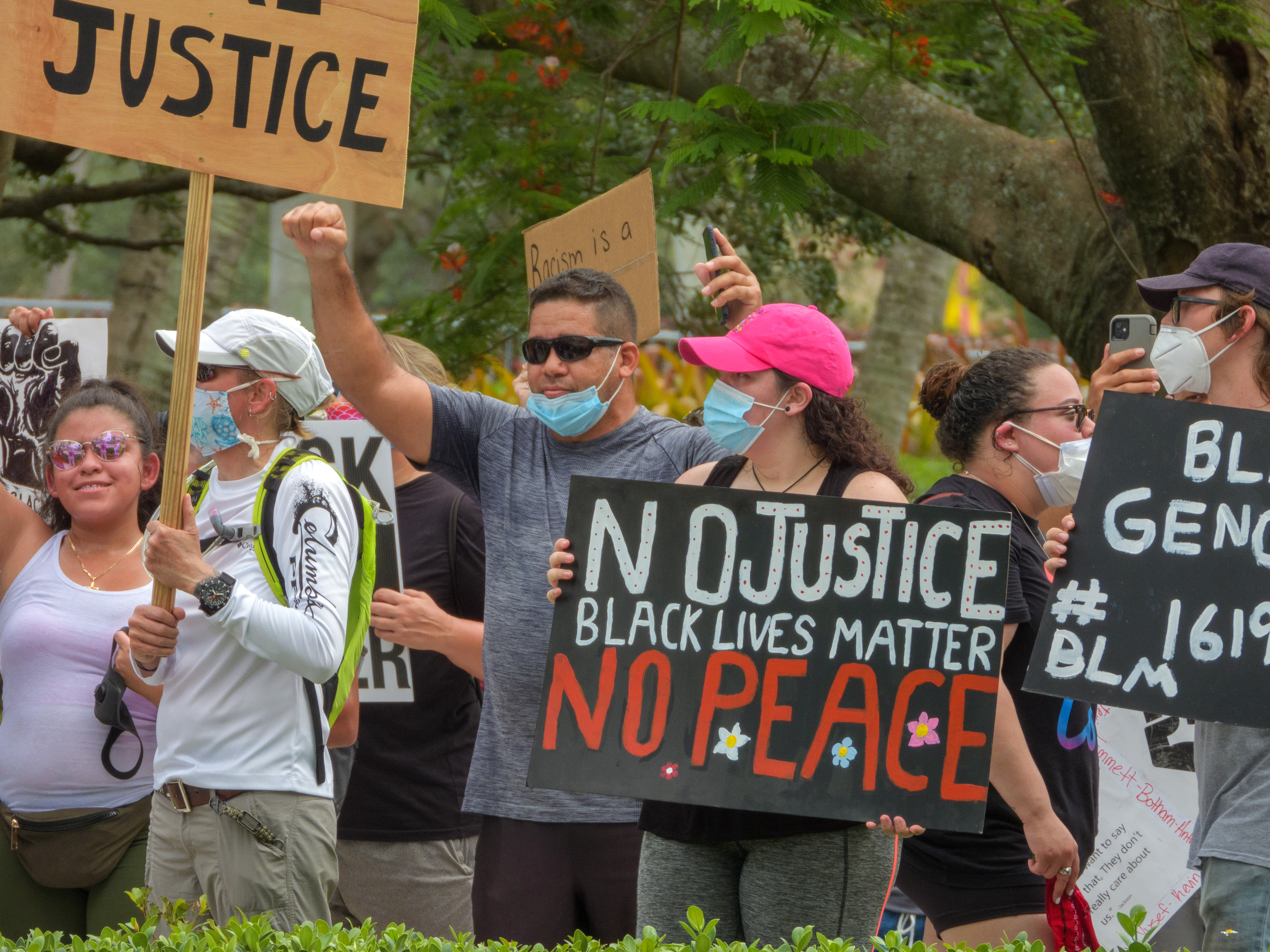
Protest in Hollywood on June 7

Starting May 31, Broward County was placed under a 9 PM – 6 AM curfew for seven days.

- Coral Springs: The Coral Springs Police Department said in an announcement on May 31 that protesters would most likely target Coral Springs, Parkland, Lauderhill, Pompano Beach, West Fort Lauderdale, Davie, and Weston, due to their majority white population. On May 31, over 50 protesters marched down Atlantic Boulevard. A police officer was suspended on May 30 for kicking a black man in the stomach. Some 30 Protesters were at the intersection of Sample Road and University Drive. A peaceful protest at the same intersection, which was organized by 2 Pakistani students in the area, occurred with a group of 300–500 protesters, with the mayor, multiple Coral Springs police officers, and the mayor of Parkland in attendance.
- Fort Lauderdale
  - On May 31, organizers from the Broward chapters of Black Lives Matter, Democratic Socialists of America, and Dream Defenders ensured a massive, orderly protest as 800–1000 people marched from Huizenga Plaza to the city's police headquarters, where some officers were on the roof. Police closed roads so the protesters could march safely. There was one act of vandalism, of an American flag at police headquarters. Most protesters then went home.
  - A police officer, Steven Pohorence, was relieved of duty after a video, released on May 31, showed him pushing a kneeling black woman who was peacefully protesting. The Florida Department of Law Enforcement is investigating. The Associated Press, using a Sunshine Law request, obtained copies of all complaints lodged against Pohorence.
  - Early in the evening there was a lengthy standoff between law enforcement and a smaller group of protesters at the intersection of Southeast First Avenue and Southeast Second Street, near the central Broward County Library. A line of sheriff's deputies blocked the north side of the intersection; Fort Lauderdale police officers stood in a line on the east side. Officers were equipped with riot gear, including helmets and shields. Some officers were on horses, and armored vehicles were deployed. Windows were broken in stores and government buildings; two were arrested for looting. An art work valued at $58,000 was destroyed. Police used tear gas and percussion grenades. About 8:30 PM, Fort Lauderdale mayor Dean Trantalis declared a state of emergency. He also announced a 9 PM – 6 AM curfew through June 2; Broward County announced the same through June 1. On June 1, National Guard troops were patrolling downtown Fort Lauderdale.
  - On June 4, "egregiously late in the game", according to the Miami Herald, the Ft. Lauderdale police department opened an Internal Affairs investigation.
  - On June 5, representatives of over a dozen Broward County law enforcement agencies held a news conference. Miramar Police Chief Dexter Williams, Miramar police chief and president of the Broward County Chiefs of Police, announced a five-point plan that includes the “eradication” of bad cops; tracking officers’ behavior; re-examining use-of-force policies; educating officers about systemic racism, bias, and cultural differences; and increasing community trust through accountability and transparency. He said his message to police officers as well as the public is "If you see something, say something".
    Broward County Sheriff Gregory Tony said he planned to double the $500,000 he has committed to the "Racial, Equity, and Implicit Bias Training" program that his agency adopted the prior year, and invited other agencies to send their officers to get the training. He said changes in the criminal justice system are needed.
    Broward County Mayor Dale Holness said the country had a systemic problem that police could not solve alone. He said, "We must seize this moment of turmoil and unrest to really step up and do what we haven't done and address the issues that face our community," He pointed to the county's highly successful Juvenile Civil Citation program, under which police can give minors civil citations instead of arresting them for a misdemeanor.
- Hallandale Beach: Police Chief Sonia Quiñones took a knee with other George Floyd protesters. Subsequently, on June 9 the entire SWAT team of the Hallandale Beach Police Department resigned en masse from the team (though not from the Police Department), citing "today's political climate" and "several recent local events". They also stated that "the team is minimally equipped, undertrained and often restrained by the politicization of our tactics to the extent of placing the safety of dogs over the safety of team members." They criticized the city's government, and especially Vice Mayor Sabrina Javellana, for making "ignorant and inaccurate statements attacking the lawful actions of the city's officers and SWAT team, both from the dais and her social media accounts." The incident in question is the 2014 killing by a SWAT team of Howard Bowe. A grand jury did not indict the shooter, and the Police Department's Internal Affairs cleared the officers as well. However, the city had to pay $425,000 to settle a civil lawsuit filed by Bowe's heirs. Javellana has called for the case to be reopened, saying: "We have our own George Floyds and Breonna Taylors". She "explained what she said was in reference to the police department's history of SWAT raids from 2006–2014 in northwest Hallandale Beach, which she said is historically black."
- Hollywood: On June 5, about 120 protesters gathered at the intersection of 441 and Griffin Road and marched north to pay tribute to George Floyd and Breonna Taylor. Among those who participated in the protest was former boxer Evander Holyfield. On June 7, hundreds more demonstrators marched through Downtown Hollywood to protest George Floyd's murder.
- Sunrise: On June 2, a peaceful protest began on Southwest 136th Avenue near the BB&T Center. Several hundred protesters progressed onto Flamingo Road, Sunrise Boulevard, Hiatus Road, and Oakland Park Boulevard. Sawgrass Mills was closed early to the public.
- Weston: Groups of high school and college students peacefully protested against police brutality and stood in solidarity with the black community and the Black Lives Matter Movement in the affluent, majority white community of Weston. Protests took place Saturday June 6, 2020, and were concentrated around Weston Road and Emerald Park Circle (by the strips malls near Griffin Road).

=== Miami-Dade County ===
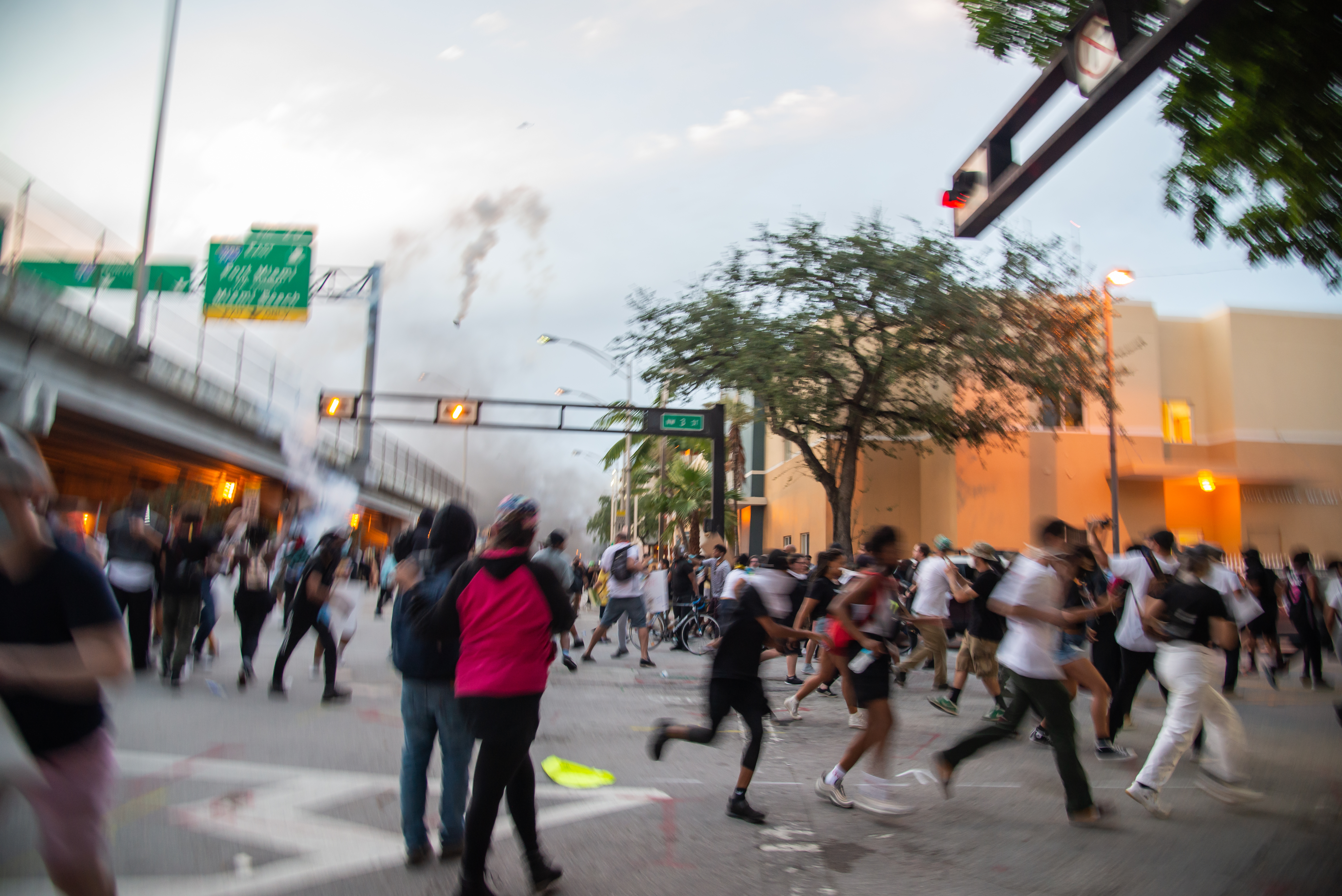
Miami protesters react to police firing chemical irritants on May 30

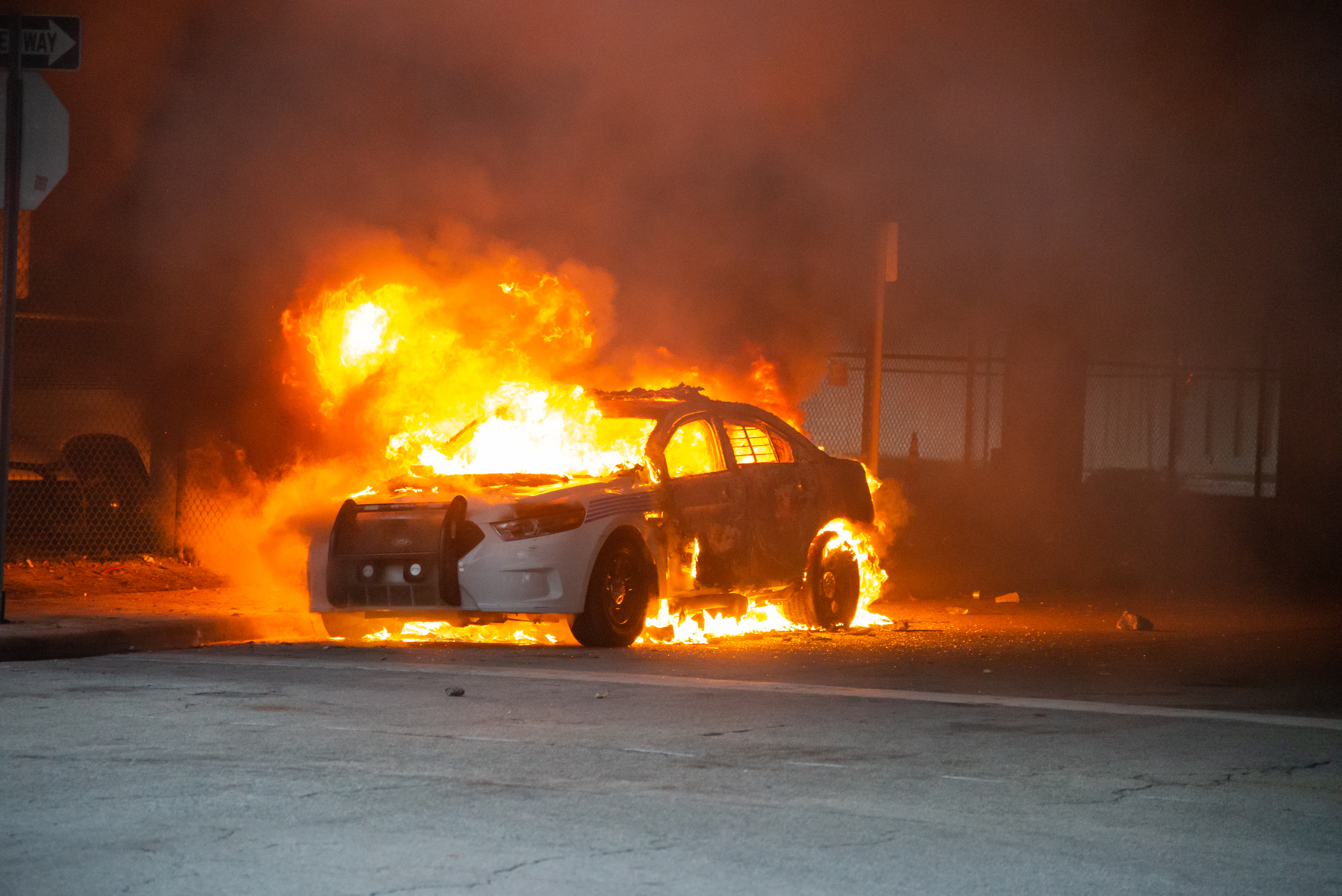
A burning police car in Miami on May 30

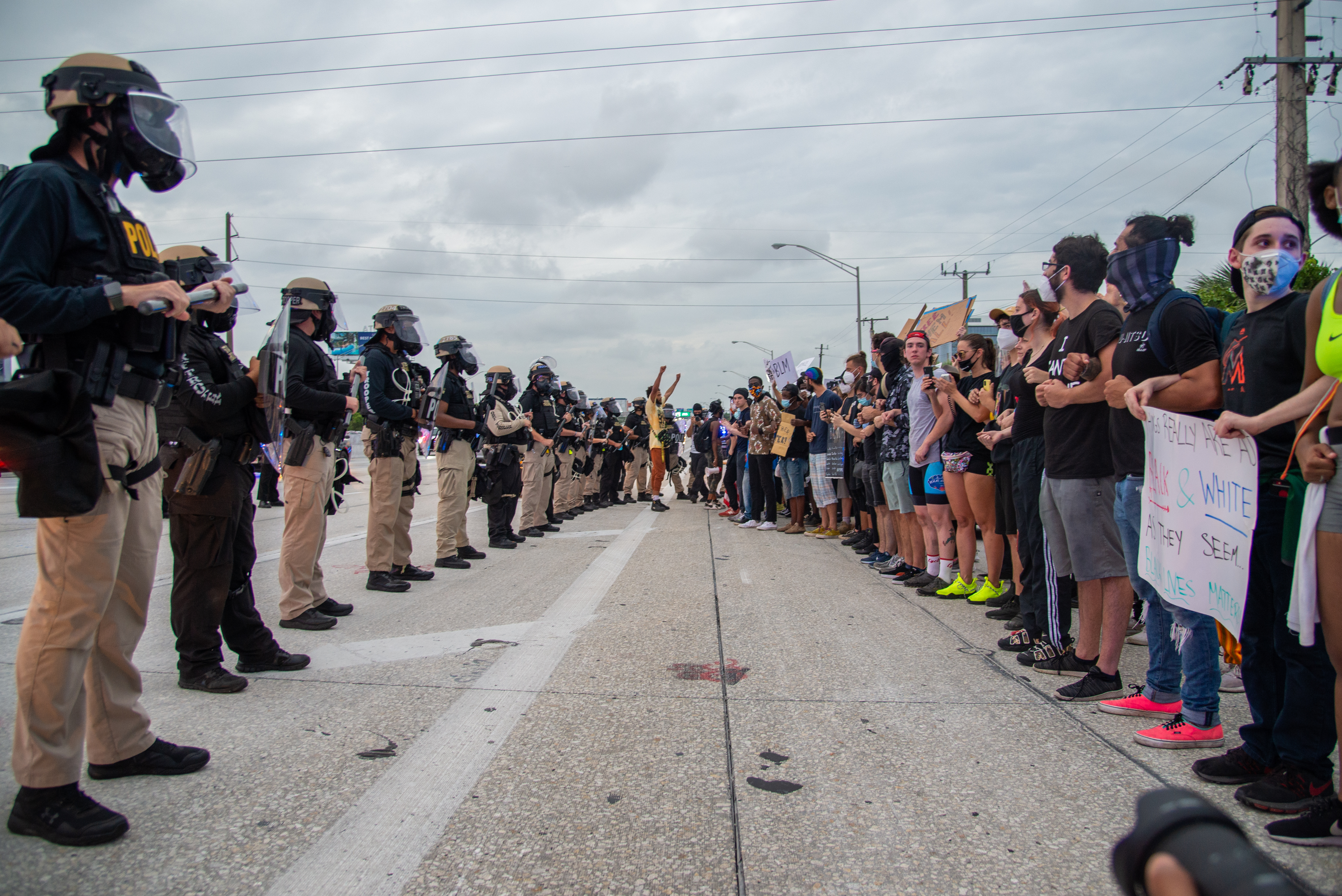
Police and protesters in Miami on June 7

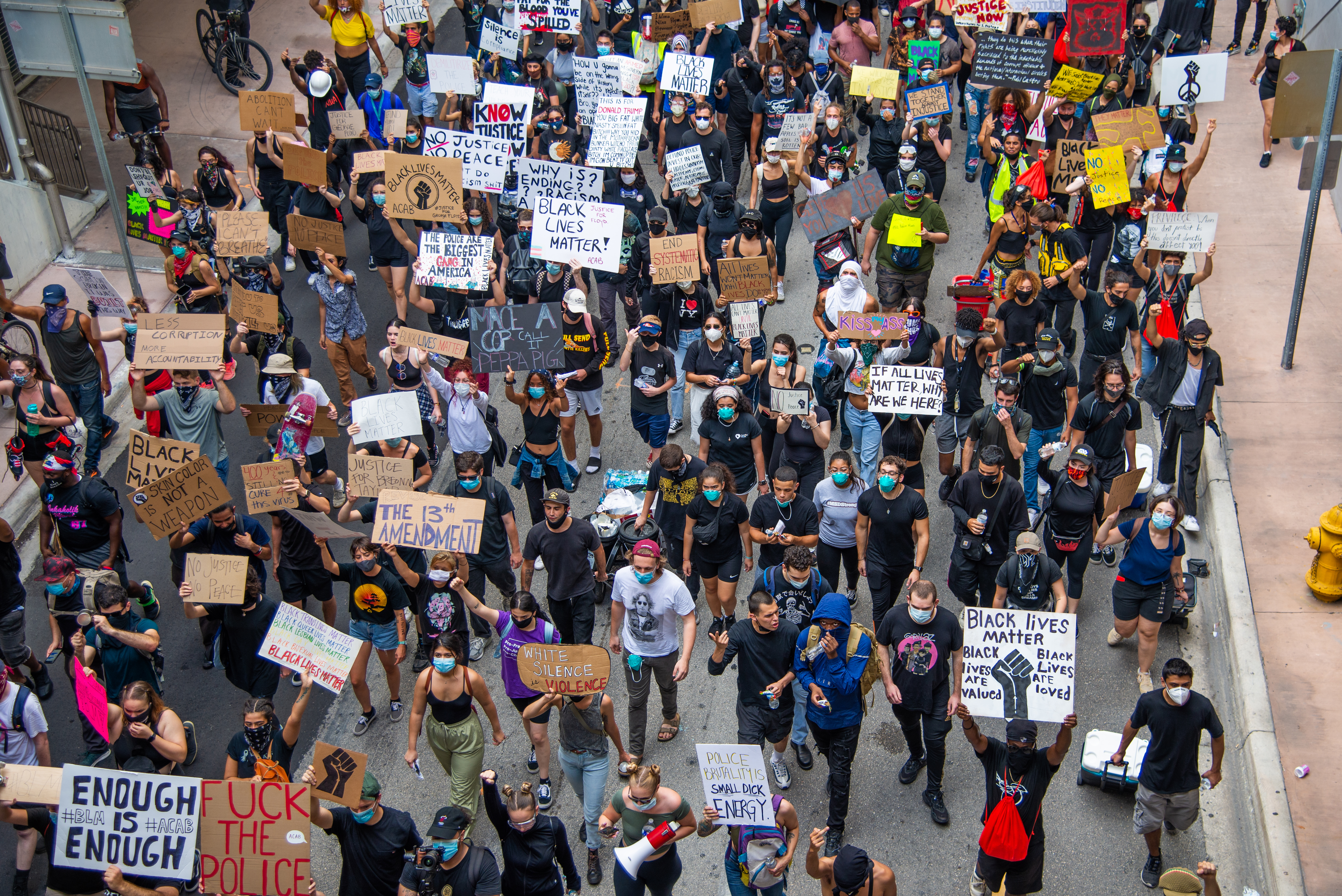
Protest in Miami on June 12

- Coral Gables: About 100 people participated in a protest on May 30 that was coordinated with the local police department. The protest sparked controversy because people said it was not led by blacks and that police officers had been invited to participate.
- Miami
  - On May 30, about 400 to 500 people protested downtown; protests began peacefully, and as of 7 PM on May 30, no arrests had been made. However, one demonstration quickly turned violent as a large group of protesters began looting the Bayside Marketplace later into the night, leading Miami-Dade mayor Carlos A. Giménez to order a local state of emergency and a 10 p.m. curfew for 7 days. On May 31, the curfew was extended until further notice. Beaches are closed.
  - The FBI announced on June 3 that it had arrested in Miami and elsewhere groups of Venezuelans, Haitians (from "Little Haiti"), Cubans, and Hondurans who were being paid to cause violence at demonstrations. Those arrested admitted they had been hired by unidentified "activists", who even provided funds for transportation to the demonstrations. Two carried large quantities of cash; the FBI is trying to determine the origin of the money, and "Cuban and Venezuelan intelligence agencies" is a possibility they are investigating.
  - U.S. Attorney General William Barr directed the Federal Bureau of Prisons to send "highly-trained and specialized federal riot teams" to Miami and Washington, D.C. On June 2, both Mayor Carlos A. Giménez and Miami-Dade Police Director Freddie Ramirez said they were surprised by their arrival. "I was unaware they were here. We didn’t ask them to be here. We told them we didn't need them here. There is no reason for them to be here", said Mayor Giménez. Ramirez said that as of June 2, the federal team had not done anything.
  - On June 4, a man playing a recording of Martin Luther King Jr.'s 1964 "I Have a Dream" speech in a park was assaulted by two white men, who were arrested.

=== Collier County ===
- Marco Island: On June 3, more than 50 people protested near Collier Boulevard. One bystander, Steven Peterson, was arrested for open carrying an AR-15 rifle, stating that he was, "just putting on a show." The officer who arrested Peterson wrote that he "had no legitimate reason to display the rifle, which is why he was arrested." A protester was also arrested for trying to grab the cellphone of Jason Beal, who according to another protester was known for recording protests.
- Naples
  - On June 1, over 300 protesters gathered at the Collier County Courthouse. The protesters, mostly teenage students, marched west toward the City of Naples City Hall. Although the protest was mostly peaceful, a handful of protesters threw water bottles at police officers and punched a police vehicle.
  - On June 6, more than 100 protesters peacefully gathered at the intersection of Collier Boulevard and Immokalee Road in North Naples. Passersby honked in support.
  - On June 10, the Collier County NAACP chapter held a peaceful protest which drew crowds of more than 1,000 protesters at the Collier County Courthouse. Several speakers spoke at the event, including the Collier County NAACP president, Vincent Keeys. After the event finished, hundreds of the attendees of the NAACP event marched toward the City of Naples City Hall in Downtown Naples.
  - On June 13, hundreds protested in North Naples on the corner of Immokalee Road and Livingston Road at a local grocery store, Seed To Table, after its CEO, Alfie Oakes, publicly called Black Lives Matter and COVID-19 a hoax on Facebook, despite one of his privately contracted workers, Paulino Salinas Cortez, dying from COVID-19 within a week of Alfie making the post on Facebook. In the Facebook post, Oakes called George Floyd "a career criminal", and strongly suggested that it was a matter of time before one of his crimes resulted in his killing. Oakes organized a counter-protest which began one hour before the Black Lives Matter protest, but the counter protesters left when it began to rain heavily. The Black Lives Matter protest was set to last from 2pm-5pm, local time, despite the rain. Lee County school district cut ties with Alfie Oakes as a result of the controversial Facebook post.

=== Lee County ===
- Bonita Springs: Over 30 protesters gathered in downtown Bonita Springs on June 1. A building in Riverside Park was vandalized with the words "We are equal" among other epithets aimed at law enforcement.
- Cape Coral: On June 12, almost 100 protesters gathered at Reflections Park and marched to the Cape Coral Police Department, where they held a moment of silence for eight minutes and forty-six seconds to honor George Floyd.
- Fort Myers
  - By June 5, protests in Fort Myers had occurred for seven straight days. On June 5, more than 600 protesters peacefully gathered. Frequently during these protests, protesters would lie on the ground while continuing to chant.
  - On June 2, the Robert E. Lee bust was removed from its pedestal in downtown Fort Myers, which was done in an effort to keep protesters from vandalizing the bust. Moreover, a petition has garnered over 1,000 signatures to change Lee County's name to Calusa County, renaming it after the indigenous peoples who occupied Southwest Florida before European contact was made.
