= Florida State Road 810 =

State highway in Florida, United States

State Road 810
- Hillsboro Boulevard

Route information
- Maintained by FDOT
- Length: 7.823 mi (12.590 km)

Major junctions
- West end: US 441 on the Parkland–Coconut Creek city line
- I-95 in Deerfield Beach; US 1 in Deerfield Beach
- East end: SR A1A in Deerfield Beach

Location
- Country: United States
- State: Florida
- Counties: Broward

Highway system
- Florida State Highway System; Interstate; US; State; Former; Pre‑1945; Toll; Scenic
← SR 809	→ SR 811

State Road 810 (SR 810), locally known as Hillsboro Boulevard, is an east–west street serving northern Broward County, Florida. The western terminus of SR 810 is an intersection with U.S. Route 441 (US 441) and SR 7 on the city line between Coconut Creek and Parkland, and the eastern terminus is at an intersection with Ocean Drive (SR A1A) in Deerfield Beach. Within Deerfield Beach, Hillsboro Boulevard forms the axis separating the north and south sections of the street numbering system. The road is within one mile (1.6 km) south of neighboring Palm Beach County throughout its entire route.

== Route description ==
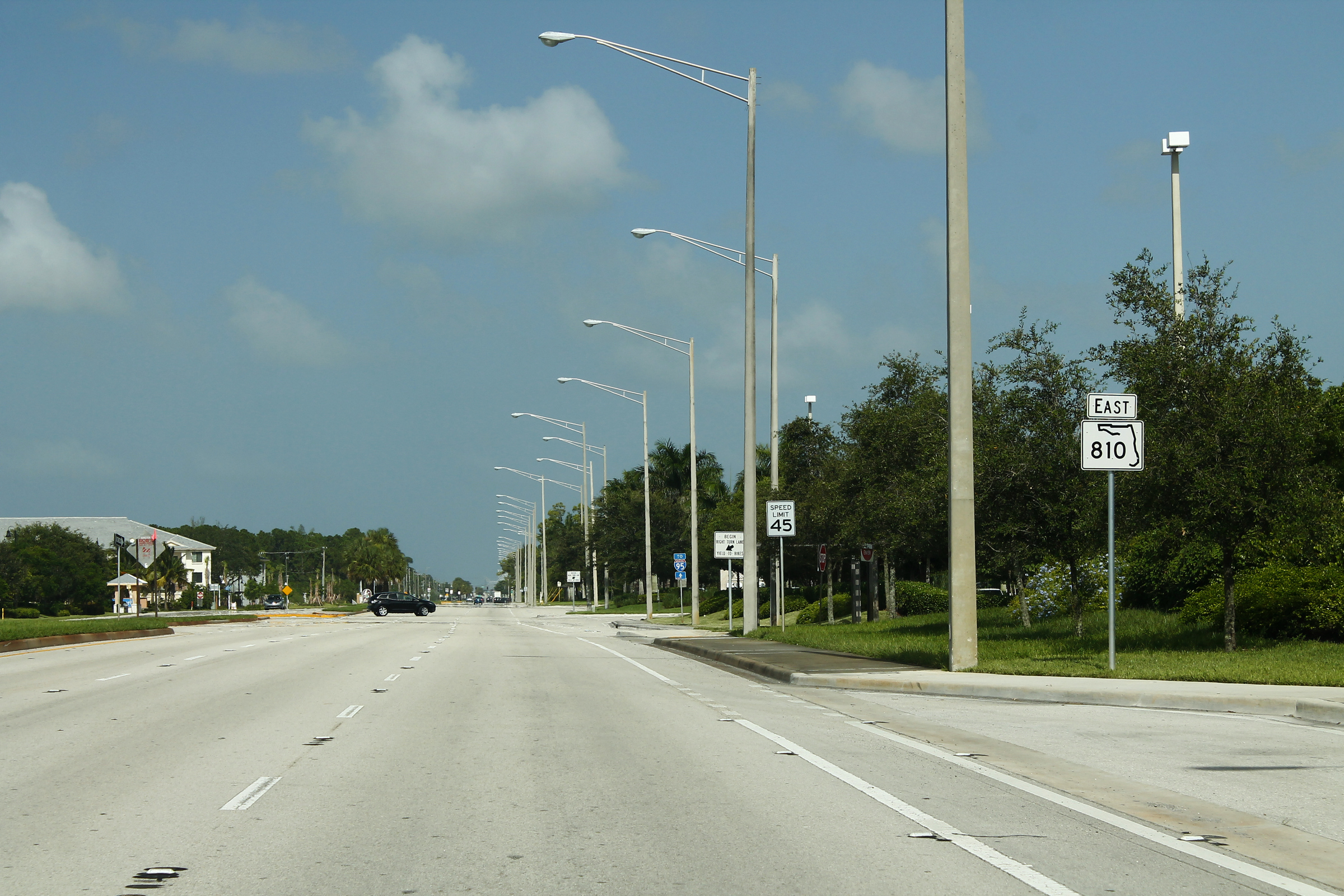
A sign for State Road 810 on Hillsboro Boulevard in Coconut Creek, August 2013

SR 810 begins at the intersection between Hillsboro Boulevard and US 441–SR 7 on the border between Parkland and Coconut Creek, with SR 810 heading east into Coconut Creek. To the west, Hillsboro Boulevard continues west for approximately 1.5 miles (2.4 km) without a state designation to an intersection with Parkside Drive. SR 810 proceeds east into Deerfield Beach, which features shopping centers alternating with mobile home parks, with the occasional park land and golf courses along the highway. It meets Interstate 95 (I-95 and SR 9) at a partial cloverleaf interchange. At Dixie Highway, the road crosses the Florida East Coast Railway tracks that carry the Brightline service. This is also the site of a proposed Tri-Rail station. SR 810 eventually ends at Ocean Drive (SR A1A) in downtown Deerfield Beach. Hillsboro Boulevard continues one block east of SR A1A as an un-numbered local street for one block, terminating at SE 21st Avenue, which provides parking for the beach.

== Major intersections ==
The entire route is in Broward County.

Location	mi	km	Destinations	Notes
Parkland–Coconut Creek line	0.000	0.000	US 441 (SR 7) to SR 869 (Sawgrass Expressway)	Road continues west without designation.
Deerfield Beach	3.092	4.976	SR 845 (Powerline Road) to SR 869	Serves Quiet Waters County Park
Deerfield Beach	4.616	7.429	Military Trail	Former SR 809
Deerfield Beach	5.360	8.626	I-95 – West Palm Beach, Miami	Exit 42 on I-95
Deerfield Beach	6.281	10.108	SR 811 south / CR 811 north (Dixie Highway)	Northern terminus of SR 811; southern terminus of CR 811
Deerfield Beach	6.951	11.187	US 1 (Federal Highway)	
Deerfield Beach	7.575– 7.655	12.191– 12.320	Bridge over the Intracoastal Waterway	
Deerfield Beach	7.823	12.590	SR A1A (Ocean Drive)	Road continues east for one block without designation
1.000 mi = 1.609 km; 1.000 km = 0.621 mi

== See also ==
- List of state highways in Florida
