= Glades Road =

Highway in Florida, United States

Glades Road
- State Road 808 and County Road 808
- SR 808 highlighted in red

Route information
- Maintained by FDOT and Palm Beach E&PW
- Length: 11.115 mi (17.888 km) 7.615 mi (12.255 km) as SR 808; 3.5 mi (5.63 km) as CR 808
- Existed: 1945 renumbering (definition)–present

Major junctions
- West end: CR 798 near Parkland
- US 441 / SR 7 near Boca Raton; Florida's Turnpike near Boca Raton; I-95 in Boca Raton
- East end: US 1 in Boca Raton

Location
- Country: United States
- State: Florida
- County: Palm Beach

Highway system
- Florida State Highway System; Interstate; US; State; Former; Pre‑1945; Toll; Scenic
← SR 807	→ SR 809

Glades Road is an 11.115-mile (17.888 km) long east–west arterial boulevard in southern Palm Beach County, Florida. The majority of the road is signed as State Road 808 (SR 808), but the westernmost 3.5 miles (5.63 km) is designated as County Road 808. SR 808 begins at an intersection with US 441–SR 7 in what was formerly Mission Bay (but is now unincorporated Boca Raton; its eastern terminus is an intersection with Federal Highway (US 1 and unsigned SR 5) in Boca Raton. The county-maintained segment proceeds west from US 441 / SR 7 and bends south to end at the western terminus of Palmetto Park Road (CR 798).

Glades Road is a major commuter route connecting the four major north–south arteries of Palm Beach County: US 441 / SR 7, Florida's Turnpike (SR 91), Interstate 95 (SR 9), and US 1 (SR 5), and is considered one of the most congested roads in Palm Beach County.

== Route description ==
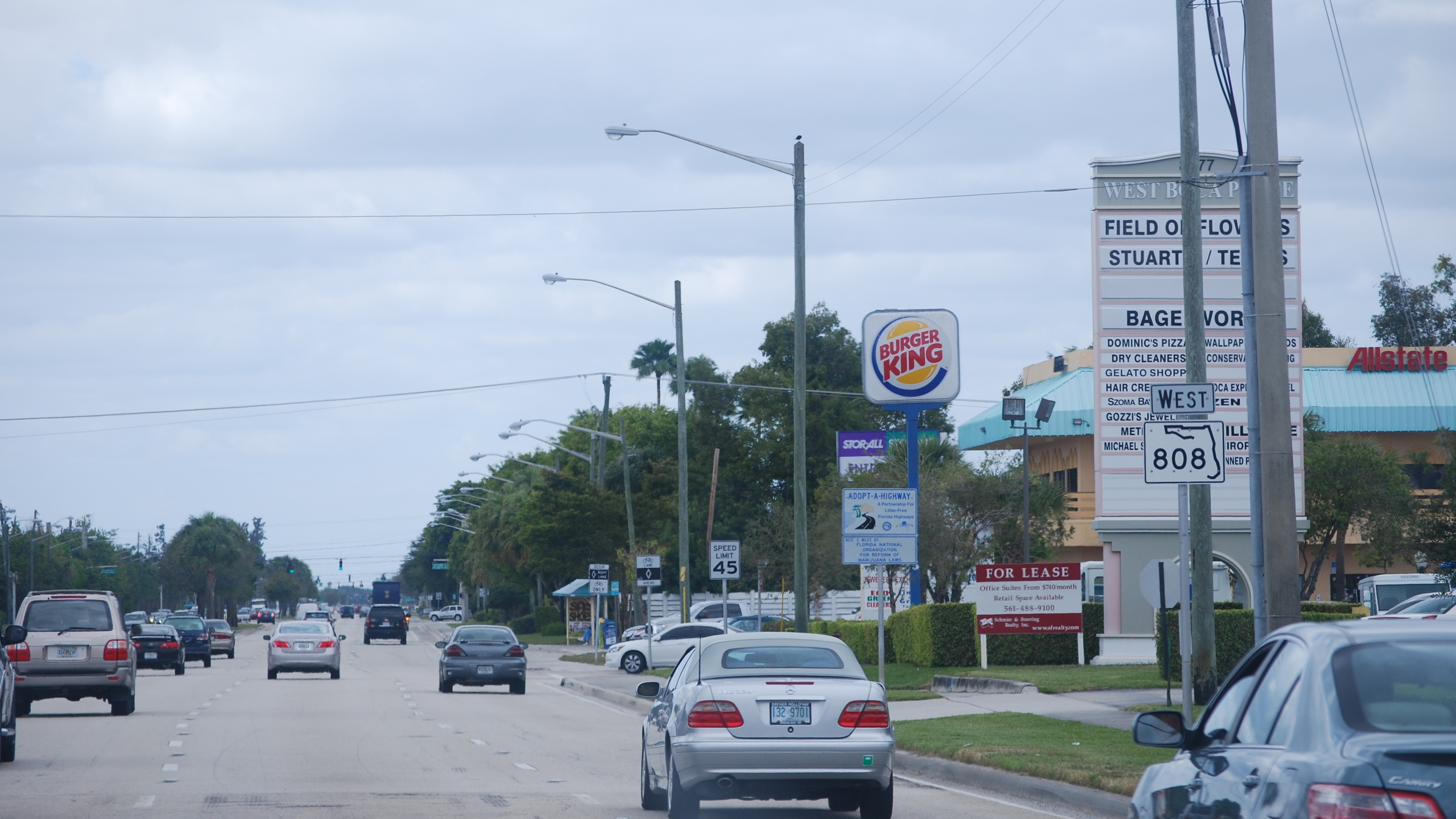
SR 808 west of Florida's Turnpike

The entirety of Glades Road has a posted speed limit of 45 miles per hour (72 km/h).

=== CR 808 ===
Glades Road proper begins at the western terminus of Palmetto Park Road (CR 798) in western unincorporated Boca Raton. It begins traveling north, passing the Waters Edge Elementary School and West Boca Raton Community High School. The right-of-way curves to the east after intersecting access roads to Burt Aaronson South County Regional Park, and serves as the main road to the many gated communities and golf clubs in the area. At an intersection with US 441 / SR 7, the route transitions to SR 808.

=== SR 808 ===
SR 808 begins at the intersection of US 441 (SR 7) in Mission Bay, meeting with several shopping centers. SR 808 heads east on Glades Road, serving as a commercial thoroughfare through Mission Bay and Boca West, and providing access to several gated communities. Two miles east of the western terminus, the road enters Boca Raton and has an interchange with Florida's Turnpike east of the actual road. East of the Turnpike, Glades Road acts as an access road for two gated communities before intersecting with the northern terminus of SR 845 (Powerline Road), which continues north as Jog Road. At St. Andrews Boulevard, Glades Road becomes commercial again, providing the northern boundary of the Boca Town Center. East of the mall, SR 808 intersects with Butts Road, providing access to Military Trail; east of there, Glades Road provides access to many business parks until its interchange with I-95. East of the interchange, the highway continues as a commercial road, providing access to Boca Raton Airport's terminal via Airport Road and the main campus of Florida Atlantic University. East of FAU, SR 808 serves a mix of commercial and residential areas while heading towards the railroad tracks and the road's eastern terminus at US 1.

== History ==
SR 808 was established in 1945 in its current route. Prior to the 1945 renumbering, the road was known as SR 395.

=== Planned extension into Broward County ===
West of US 441, Glades Road continues and turns southward, terminating at Palmetto Park Road. According to maps published by Fort Lauderdale-based Dolph Map Company, an extension of the small segment of University Drive (as the very end portion of the road is designated on some maps, though other maps show it as Glades Road all the way through) has been proposed to connect to the present-day University Drive (State Road 817) in Broward County. No indication is given of whether the extension would be a state or county road or what number designation it would have if any.

Road extension plans were abandoned in 2009 to appease resident concerns about traffic. An isolated area of Palm Beach County was transferred to Broward.

The section of Glades Road that exists west of US 441 was converted from state to county jurisdiction after July 2009.

== Major intersections ==
The entire route is in Palm Beach County.

Location	mi	km	Destinations	Notes
	0.00	0.00	Palmetto Park Road (CR 798) east	Western termini of CR 808 and CR 798 (former SR 798)
	3.50 0.000	5.63 0.000	US 441 (SR 7) to SR 869 (Sawgrass Expressway)	Route transitions to SR 808
	2.125	3.420	Florida's Turnpike – Miami, Orlando	Exit 75 on Turnpike
Boca Raton	3.588	5.774	SR 845 south (Powerline Road) / Jog Road north	Northern terminus of SR 845 (route formerly continued further north)
Boca Raton	4.634	7.458	Butts Road to CR 809 (Military Trail)	Grade-separated access; to former SR 809
Boca Raton	5.280	8.497	I-95 – West Palm Beach, Miami	Exit 45 on I-95
Boca Raton	7.390	11.893	Dixie Highway	
Boca Raton	7.615	12.255	US 1 (Federal Highway)	
1.000 mi = 1.609 km; 1.000 km = 0.621 mi: Tolled; Route transition
