= Florida State Road 849 =

State highway in Florida, United States

State Road 849
- Atlantic Boulevard Extension; Northwest 31st Avenue

Route information
- Maintained by FDOT
- Length: 0.957 mi (1,540 m)

Major junctions
- South end: SR 814 in Pompano Beach
- North end: Florida's Turnpike / CR 912 in Pompano Beach

Location
- Country: United States
- State: Florida
- Counties: Broward

Highway system
- Florida State Highway System; Interstate; US; State; Former; Pre‑1945; Toll; Scenic
← SR 848	→ SR 850

State Road 849 (SR 849) is a 1-mile-long (1.6 km) state highway from the Florida's Turnpike access road connecting Martin Luther King Boulevard/Hammondville Road and Coconut Creek Parkway (Broward County Route 912) to the north and Atlantic Boulevard (SR 814) to the south. State Road 849 lies entirely within the city limits of Pompano Beach, Florida. In addition, a campus of Broward Community College is situated 0.5-mile (0.80 km) to the west of the northern terminus of SR 849; and motorists can also use the Turnpike, SR 849, and SR 814 eastward to go to Pompano Beach Airpark.

== Route description ==
State Road 849 begins at an intersection with State Road 814 (Atlantic Boulevard) in Pompano Beach, Florida. The route progresses northward along Atlantic Boulevard Extension as a four-lane arterial boulevard. The road makes a curve to the northeast after passing over a bridge, but soon turns northward once again, passing a short stretch of commercial businesses. The highway then intersects with Dr. Martin Luther King Boulevard (County Road 912), where the designation terminates. The right-of-way for State Road 849 continues as the access ramp to the Florida's Turnpike (State Road 91) Exit 67.

== History ==
Although it passes through a residential development, SR 849 was originally built to be an access road between the Turnpike and Atlantic Boulevard, a major east–west highway that provides access to Pompano Park Race Track. About 1970, a section of SR 814 (which was originally on Hammondville Road between US 441-SR 7 and SR 811) was rerouted along the Atlantic Boulevard Extension and eastward along Atlantic Boulevard. About 1983, as part of a statewide renumbering, Hammondville Road (which was renamed Coconut Creek Parkway) was redesignated SR 912 and the Atlantic Boulevard Extension (NW 31st Avenue) received SR 849 (afterwards SR 814 was - and is - entirely on Atlantic Boulevard).

Prior to 1983, SR 849 was the designation of Sanctuary Road near Naples.

== Major intersections ==
The entire route is in Pompano Beach, Broward County.

mi	km	Destinations	Notes
0.000	0.000	SR 814 (Atlantic Boulevard) – Pompano Beach	
0.957	1.540	Coconut Creek Parkway (CR 912 west) / Hammondville Road east – Coconut Creek, Margate	CR 912 was formerly SR 912
0.957	1.540	Florida's Turnpike – Miami, Orlando	Exit 67 on Turnpike; no toll on southbound entrance
1.000 mi = 1.609 km; 1.000 km = 0.621 mi: Electronic toll collection
