= Commercial Boulevard =

Highway in Broward County, Florida, US

State Road 870 and County Road 870
- Commercial Boulevard
- SR 870 in red, CR 870 in blue

Route information
- Maintained by FDOT and Broward Public Works
- Length: 15.193 mi (24.451 km) 12.493 mi (20.106 km) as SR 870

Major junctions
- West end: SR 869 in Sunrise
- Florida's Turnpike in Tamarac; US 441 / SR 7 in Tamarac; I-95 in Oakland; US 1 in Fort Lauderdale
- East end: SR A1A in Lauderdale-by-the-Sea

Location
- Country: United States
- State: Florida
- County: Broward

Highway system
- Florida State Highway System; Interstate; US; State; Former; Pre‑1945; Toll; Scenic
← SR 869	→ SR 874

Commercial Boulevard is a 15.2-mile-long (24.5 km) highway serving northern Broward County, Florida, mostly designated as State Road 870 (SR 870). The road extends from its western terminus in Sunrise at SR 869, the Sawgrass Expressway, and serves as a major commercial route through Oakland Park, and Fort Lauderdale, intersecting Florida's Turnpike, U.S. Route 441 (US 441), Interstate 95 (I-95) and US 1 before reaching its eastern terminus at SR A1A (Ocean Boulevard) in Lauderdale-by-the-Sea, Florida.

The westernmost 2.7 miles (4.3 km) of Commercial Boulevard are designated, but not signed, as County Road 870 (CR 870).

== Route description ==
Commercial Boulevard begins at exit 5 of the Sawgrass Expressway, with SR 870 beginning at SR 817 (University Drive). The road heads east, with an interchange with the Turnpike, followed by an intersection with US 441. Entering Fort Lauderdale, SR 870 intersects with Powerline Road, and then enters Oakland Park, passing by Fort Lauderdale Executive Airport, Lockhart Stadium, and Fort Lauderdale Stadium before an interchange with Interstate 95. Continuing east, SR 870 intersects with State Road 811 before reentering Fort Lauderdale, intersecting with US 1. It then enters Lauderdale-by-the-Sea and reaches its eastern terminus at an intersection with State Road A1A (Ocean Boulevard).

== Major intersections ==
The entire route is in Broward County.

Location	mi	km	Destinations	Notes
Sunrise	0.0	0.0	SR 869 (Sawgrass Expressway) to I-75 – Miami, Orlando	Tolled interchange; exit 5 on SR 869
Sunrise–Tamarac line	2.7 0.000	4.3 0.000	SR 817 (University Drive)	Transition from CR 870 to SR 870
Tamarac	2.60	4.18	Florida's Turnpike – Orlando, Miami	Exit 62 on Turnpike
Tamarac	3.220	5.182	US 441 / SR 7	
Fort Lauderdale–Oakland Park line	6.248	10.055	SR 845 (Powerline Road)	
Oakland Park	6.45	10.38	I-95 – West Palm Beach, Miami	Exit 32 on I-95 (unsigned SR 9)
Oakland Park	6.758	10.876	Andrews Avenue (CR 811A)	Former SR 811A
Oakland Park	7.587	12.210	SR 811 (Dixie Highway)	
Fort Lauderdale	8.758	14.095	US 1 (Federal Highway)	Road is unsigned SR 5
Intracoastal Waterway	9.479– 9.545	15.255– 15.361	Drawbridge	
Lauderdale-by-the-Sea	12.493	20.106	SR A1A (Ocean Drive)	
1.000 mi = 1.609 km; 1.000 km = 0.621 mi: Electronic toll collection; Route transition
