= Atlantic Boulevard (Broward County) =

Highway in Florida, United States

Atlantic Boulevard
- State Road 814 and County Road 814
- CR 814 in blue, SR 814 in red

Route information
- Maintained by FDOT and Broward County
- Length: 13.024 mi (20.960 km) 7.124 miles (11.465 km) as SR 814; 5.9 miles (9.5 km) as CR 814

Major junctions
- West end: SR 869 in Coral Springs
- US 441 in Margate; Florida's Turnpike south in Coconut Creek and Pompano Beach; I-95 in Pompano Beach; US 1 in Pompano Beach
- East end: SR A1A in Pompano Beach

Location
- Country: United States
- State: Florida
- County: Broward

Highway system
- Florida State Highway System; Interstate; US; State; Former; Pre‑1945; Toll; Scenic
← SR 812	→ SR 816

Atlantic Boulevard, consisting mostly of State Road 814 (SR 814), is a major commercial and commuter highway in northern Broward County, Florida. The 13-mile-long (21 km) divided highway extends from the Sawgrass Expressway in Coral Springs to State Road A1A in Pompano Beach. It serves as the latitudinal baseline for the street grid for the city of Pompano Beach. The portion of the boulevard west of U.S. Route 441 is locally maintained as County Road 814.

== Route description ==
=== County Road 814 ===
Atlantic Boulevard begins its eastward journey from the Sawgrass Expressway in Coral Springs. The road meanders through residential zones before it arrives at its intersection with University Drive, where Coral Square is located. Afterward, SR 814 borders the former CDP of Ramblewood East. Ramblewood Middle School is located there, 1 mile (1.6 km) from the SR 817 intersection. The road continues eastward, passing by apartment buildings and a golf course before its intersection with US 441 (SR 7) in Margate.

Conflicting signage on Atlantic Boulevard does not clearly show the location of SR 814's western terminus. County Road 814 shields still exist at the US 441 intersection, but State Road 814 shields were erected at the Sawgrass Expressway interchange upon the exit's opening. In 2009, overhead signs were erected at the intersection of University Drive and Atlantic Boulevard, which designate the road as County Road 814. The official FDOT county highway map also shows SR 814's western terminus and CR 814's eastern terminus located at US 441. There are similar conflicts with other east-west roads which terminate at the Sawgrass Expressway; however, there are no County Road shields present on those roads, and they are thus unsigned.

=== State Road 814 ===
SR 814 begins at US 441, and has an intersection with Lyons Road, another major north-south corridor, 1.2 miles (1.9 km) later. Soon after, the road accesses an interchange with Florida's Turnpike south. Drivers who wish to take Florida's Turnpike north are directed to SR 849, the extension of Atlantic Boulevard. After the interchange with the Turnpike, SR 814 enters Pompano Beach, where the road becomes the latitudinal baseline for the city's street grid. Soon after, SR 814 intersects Andrews Avenue (which has the hidden designation of County Road 811A) and Interstate 95, followed by Florida State Road 811 (Dixie Highway. The intersection with Dixie Highway is the center of Pompano Beach's street grid. Immediately paralleling Dixie Highway is the Florida East Coast Railway, which carries the Brightline service. One block north of Atlantic Boulevard is the site of a proposed Tri-Rail station.

Afterward, SR 814 has one more major intersection with US 1 (Federal Highway) before its eastern terminus at SR A1A (Ocean Boulevard), just before the Atlantic Ocean.

== History ==
From 1945 until the early 1970s, all of Hammondville Road (State Road 912) was the original State Road 814, which continued eastward to State Road A1A on Atlantic Boulevard after a short zigzag involving North Dixie Highway (State Road 811). From the early 1970s to about 1983, State Road 814 between Florida's Turnpike and Dixie Highway was rerouted along the entirety of Atlantic Boulevard. This alignment of State Road 814 lasted about a decade, before the western end of State Road 814 was rerouted onto a westward extension of Atlantic Boulevard. The north–south section along Northwest 31 Avenue was redesignated State Road 849 by Florida Department of Transportation, and Hammondville Road became Coconut Creek Parkway (State Road 912). Around the year 2000, State Road 912 was returned to Broward County control and converted to County Road 912. In 2016, Atlantic Boulevard east of Blanche Ely Avenue was transferred to the City of Pompano Beach, with the exception of the S.C. Fox Memorial Bridge, along with SR 811 within the city limits, in exchange for a $4,562,065 fee paid by FDOT.

== Major intersections ==
The entire route is in Broward County.

Location	mi	km	Destinations	Notes
Coral Springs	0.0	0.0	SR 869 (Sawgrass Expressway) to Florida's Turnpike / I-75 – Miami, Orlando, Naples	Exit 8 on SR 869
Coral Springs	2.8	4.5	SR 817 (University Drive)	
Margate	5.9 0.000	9.5 0.000	US 441 (SR 7)	East end of CR 814; west end of SR 814
Coconut Creek	1.230	1.979	Lyons Road (Northwest 46th Avenue)	Jughandles for left turns from SR 814
Coconut Creek–Pompano Beach line	1.71	2.75	Florida's Turnpike south – Miami	Exit 66 on Turnpike
Pompano Beach	2.482	3.994	SR 849 north (Northwest 31st Avenue) to Florida's Turnpike	Former SR 814 west
Pompano Beach	3.029	4.875	SR 845 (Powerline Road)	
Pompano Beach	4.009	6.452	Andrews Avenue (CR 811A south)	Former SR 811A
Pompano Beach	4.30	6.92	I-95 – West Palm Beach, Miami	Exit 36 on I-95
Pompano Beach	4.675	7.524	Northwest 6th Avenue	East end of state maintenance
Pompano Beach	4.930	7.934	SR 811 (Dixie Highway)	
Pompano Beach	6.375	10.260	US 1	
Pompano Beach	6.895– 6.966	11.096– 11.211	S.C. Fox Memorial Bridge over Atlantic Intracoastal Waterway (state-maintained)	
Pompano Beach	7.124	11.465	SR A1A (Ocean Boulevard)	
1.000 mi = 1.609 km; 1.000 km = 0.621 mi: Tolled; Route transition
