= Florida State Road 844 =

State highway in Florida, United States

State Road 844
- Northeast 14th Street

Route information
- Maintained by FDOT
- Length: 0.902 mi (1,452 m)

Major junctions
- West end: US 1 in Pompano Beach
- East end: SR A1A in Pompano Beach

Location
- Country: United States
- State: Florida
- Counties: Broward

Highway system
- Florida State Highway System; Interstate; US; State; Former; Pre‑1945; Toll; Scenic
← SR 843	→ SR 845

State Road 844 (SR 844), locally known as the Northeast 14th Street, is a 0.90-mile-long (1.45 km), east–west street crossing the Intracoastal Waterway and connecting U.S. Route 1 (US 1) and State Road A1A in Pompano Beach, Broward County, Florida.

== Route description ==
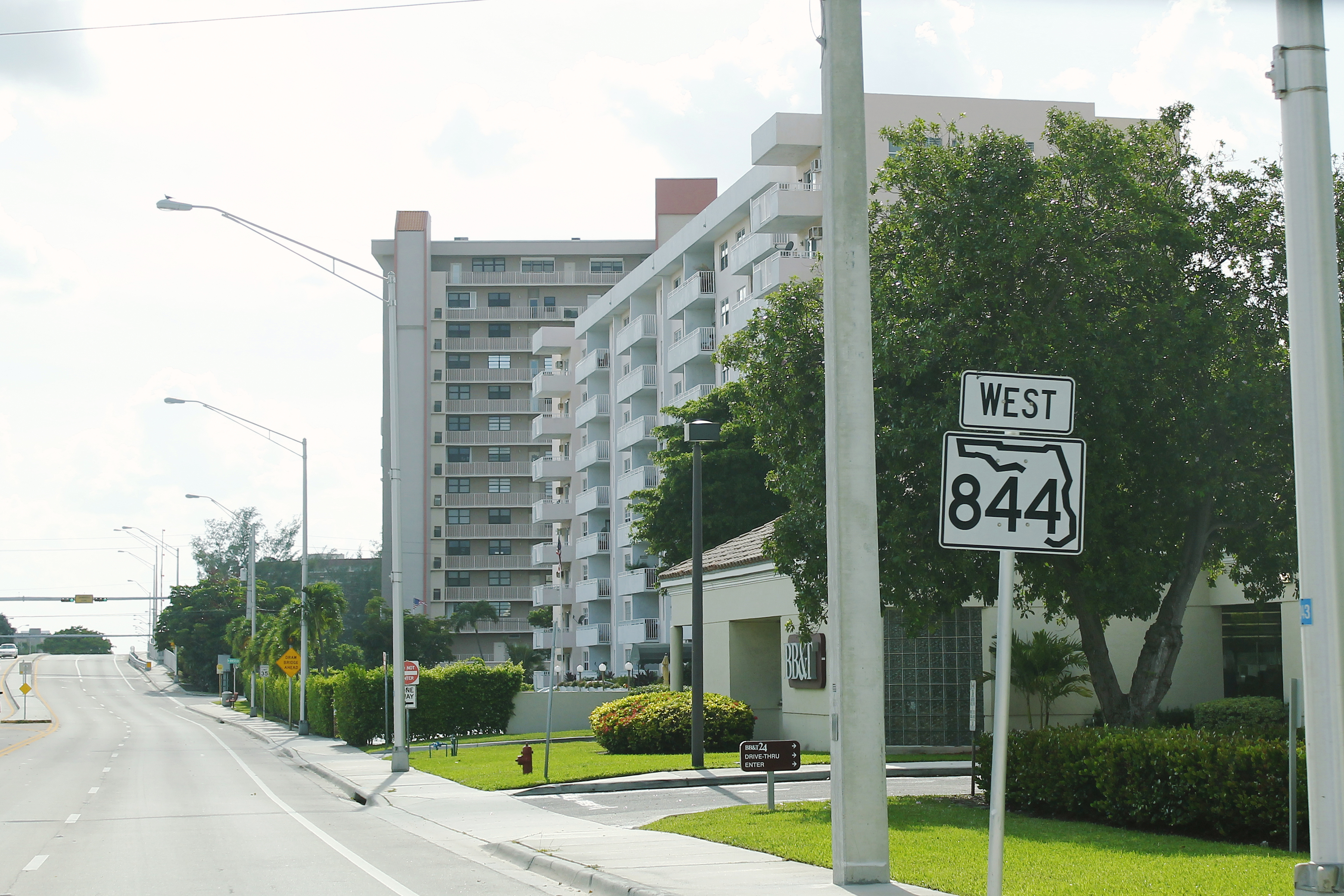
A sign for SR 844 in Pompano Beach

State Road 844 begins at US 1 in Pompano Beach, at the eastern end of the Pompano Beach Municipal Golf Course, with the Pompano Beach Airpark and Pompano Citi Centre nearby on US 1. SR 844 heads east of US 1, passing through an area of apartment complexes and commercial buildings. Two blocks from the eastern terminus of SR A1A, SR 844 crosses the Intracoastal Waterway and passes by more commercial buildings before ending at SR A1A, one block west of the beach.

== Major intersections ==
The entire route is in Pompano Beach, Broward County.

mi	km	Destinations	Notes
0.000	0.000	US 1 (Federal Highway)	Road is unsigned SR 5
0.648– 0.715	1.043– 1.151	14th Street Causeway over the Intracoastal Waterway	
0.902	1.452	SR A1A	
1.000 mi = 1.609 km; 1.000 km = 0.621 mi
