= Sunrise Boulevard (Broward County) =

Highway in Broward County, Florida

Sunrise Boulevard
- State Road 838 and County Road 838
- SR 838 in red, CR 838 in blue

Route information
- Maintained by FDOT and Broward Public Works
- Length: 15.602 mi (25.109 km) 10.202 mi (16.419 km) as SR 838

Major junctions
- West end: SR 817 in Plantation
- Florida's Turnpike in Plantation; US 441 / SR 7 Plantation and Lauderhill; I-95 in Fort Lauderdale; US 1 in Fort Lauderdale
- East end: SR A1A in Fort Lauderdale

Location
- Country: United States
- State: Florida
- County: Broward

Highway system
- Florida State Highway System; Interstate; US; State; Former; Pre‑1945; Toll; Scenic
← SR 836	→ SR 842

Sunrise Boulevard is a 15.6 miles (25.1 km) long east–west highway serving central Broward County mostly designated State Road 838 (SR 838). The road begins at an interchange with the Sawgrass Expressway (SR 869) in Sunrise and continues east to North Ocean Boulevard (SR A1A) in Fort Lauderdale, next to Hugh Taylor Birch State Park. For 0.91 miles (1.46 km) in downtown Fort Lauderdale, SR 838 overlaps U.S. Route 1.

The westernmost 5.4 miles (8.7 km) of Sunrise Boulevard carries the unsigned designation of County Road 838 along with its state road designation.

== Route description ==
Sunrise Boulevard has its western terminus at the Sawgrass Expressway. On the northwest corner of its intersection with Flamingo Road is Sawgrass Mills, one of the nation's largest malls. After it passes the mall, SR 838 passes through mainly residential areas until its intersection with University Drive, where the state road designation begins.

About 2 miles (3.2 km) down the road is Plantation High School, followed by interchanges with Florida's Turnpike and US 441 (SR 7), with the latter intersection at the border between Plantation and Lauderhill. Central Broward Regional Park and the Swap Shop border the road to the north after the interchange with US 441 as it enters the Dillard Park neighborhood of Fort Lauderdale. An interchange with I-95 soon follows.

After its intersection with Powerline Road, SR 838 becomes concurrent with US 1 (Federal Highway) for about 1 mile (1.6 km). After it passes by The Galleria at Fort Lauderdale east of the second intersection with Federal Highway, it crosses over the Intracoastal Waterway and from here to its eastern terminus at SR A1A, Sunrise Boulevard forms the southern border of Hugh Taylor Birch State Park.

== Major intersections ==
The entire route is in Broward County.

Location	mi	km	Destinations	Notes
Sunrise	0.0	0.0	SR 869 (Sawgrass Expressway) to I-75 – Miami, Orlando	Tolled interchange; exit 1 on SR 869
Sunrise	1.8	2.9	Flamingo Road (CR 823)	
Plantation	5.4 0.000	8.7 0.000	SR 817 (University Drive)	Transition from CR 838 to SR 838
Plantation	3.165	5.094	Florida's Turnpike – Orlando, Miami	Exit 58 on Turnpike
Plantation–Lauderhill line	4.03	6.49	US 441 / SR 7	Diamond interchange
Fort Lauderdale	6.1	9.8	I-95 – West Palm Beach, Miami	Exit 29 on I-95 (unsigned SR 9)
Fort Lauderdale	7.050	11.346	SR 845 north (Powerline Road)	Southern terminus of SR 845
Fort Lauderdale	7.409	11.924	Andrews Avenue (CR 811A north)	Southern terminus of CR 811A (former SR 811A)
Fort Lauderdale	8.161	13.134	US 1 south (Federal Highway)	Western terminus of US 1 (unsigned SR 5) concurrency
Fort Lauderdale	9.011	14.502	US 1 north (Federal Highway)	Eastern terminus of US 1 concurrency
Fort Lauderdale	9.831– 9.900	15.821– 15.933	Intracoastal Waterway drawbridge	
Fort Lauderdale	10.202	16.419	SR A1A (Fort Lauderdale Beach Boulevard)	
1.000 mi = 1.609 km; 1.000 km = 0.621 mi: Concurrency terminus; Electronic toll collection; Route transition
