= Hugh Taylor Birch State Park =

State park in Florida, United States

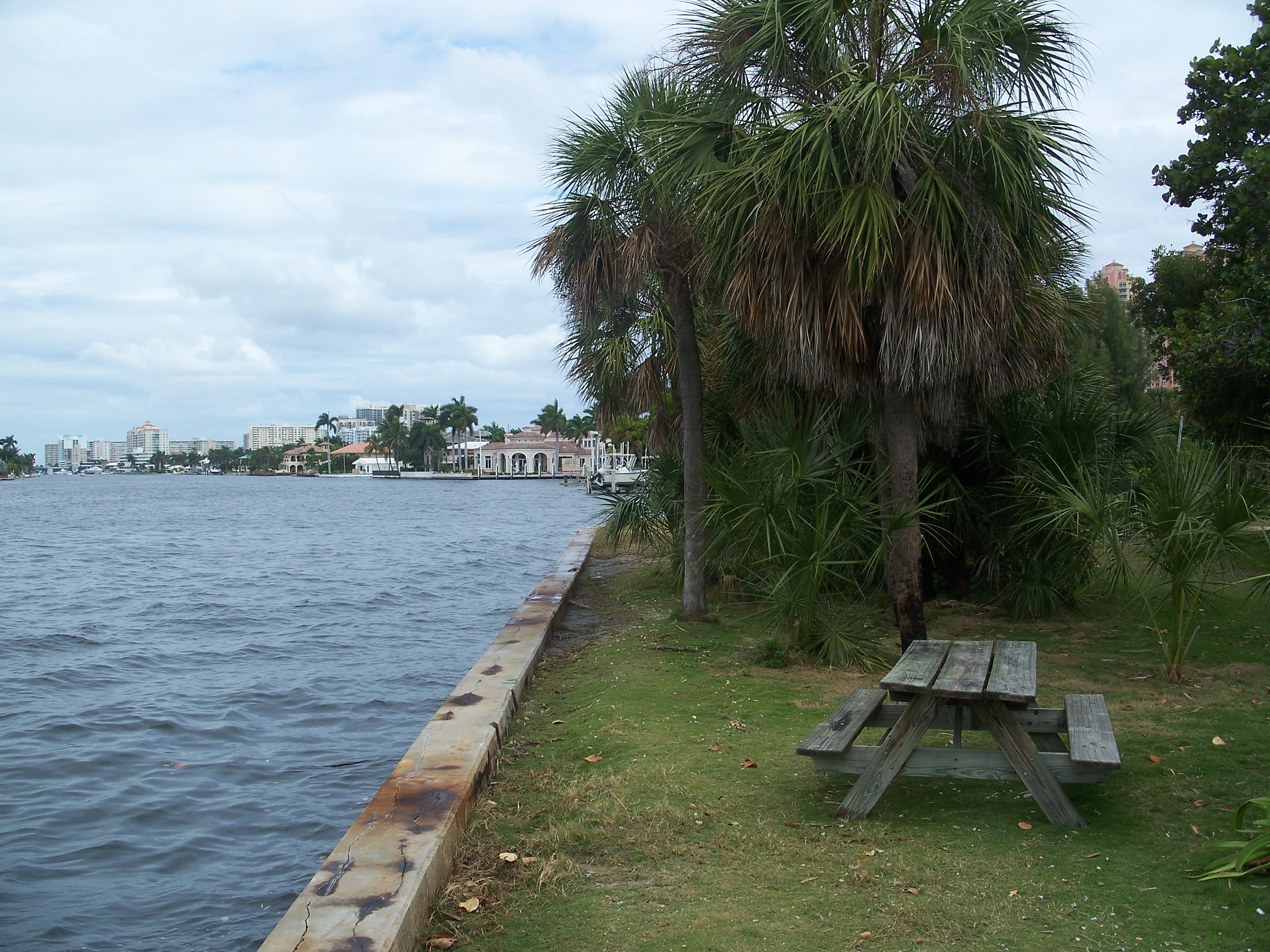
- Picnic table in the park

- Location within Florida Location within the United States
- Interactive map of Hugh Taylor Birch State Park
- Location: Broward County, Florida, USA
- Nearest city: Fort Lauderdale, Florida
- Coordinates: 26°08′42″N 80°06′18″W
- Established: 1941
- Governing body: Florida Department of Environmental Protection

Hugh Taylor Birch State Park is a Florida State Park located in Fort Lauderdale, on East Sunrise Boulevard (SR 838), between the Intracoastal Waterway and SR A1A.

== History ==
Birch State park's roots began in 1893 when Chicago attorney Hugh Taylor Birch visited South Florida in search of a secluded area to build a home. Ultimately, he chose a small village in Fort Lauderdale, Florida that included just a few homes, old army posts, and a store.

He purchased the oceanfront property for approximately a dollar an acre, ultimately owning a 3.5 mile stretch of beachfront. At age 90, in 1940, he built an Art Deco home on his 180-acre estate naming it "Terramar" or "land to the sea" and maintaining it until his death in 1943. This is now home to the park's visitor center.

== Fauna ==
Among the wildlife of the park are the gopher tortoise, eastern indigo snake, butterflies, and turtles. Visitors also can see gray squirrels, marsh rabbits, and opossums, as well as more than 200 species of wading birds, hawks, and ducks.

In 2015, gray foxes had returned to the area after being absent in the area for almost a decade.

== Recreational activities ==
Activities include canoeing, bicycling, fishing, swimming, Segway tours and group camping. Visitors can also enjoy inline skating, hiking, picnicing, and wildlife viewing.

Amenities include kayak and jet ski rental, a mile-long freshwater lagoon, two short trails, a beach, picnic areas, and a group/youth campground. In recent years, an outdoor restaurant and bar joint, Park & Ocean, was built on the outskirts of the park overlooking the ocean.

== Terramar Visitor Center ==
The Terramar Visitor Center is located in the Mediterranean and Art Deco style home of Hugh Taylor Birch, an attorney for Standard Oil who built his home in 1940. The visitor center is open from 9:00am until 4:00pm, Monday through Friday. Terramar features exhibits about Hugh Taylor Birch, the history of Fort Lauderdale, Florida ecology and wildlife of the park's ecosystem.

== Hours ==
Florida state parks are open between 8 a.m. and sundown every day of the year (including holidays).

== Gallery ==
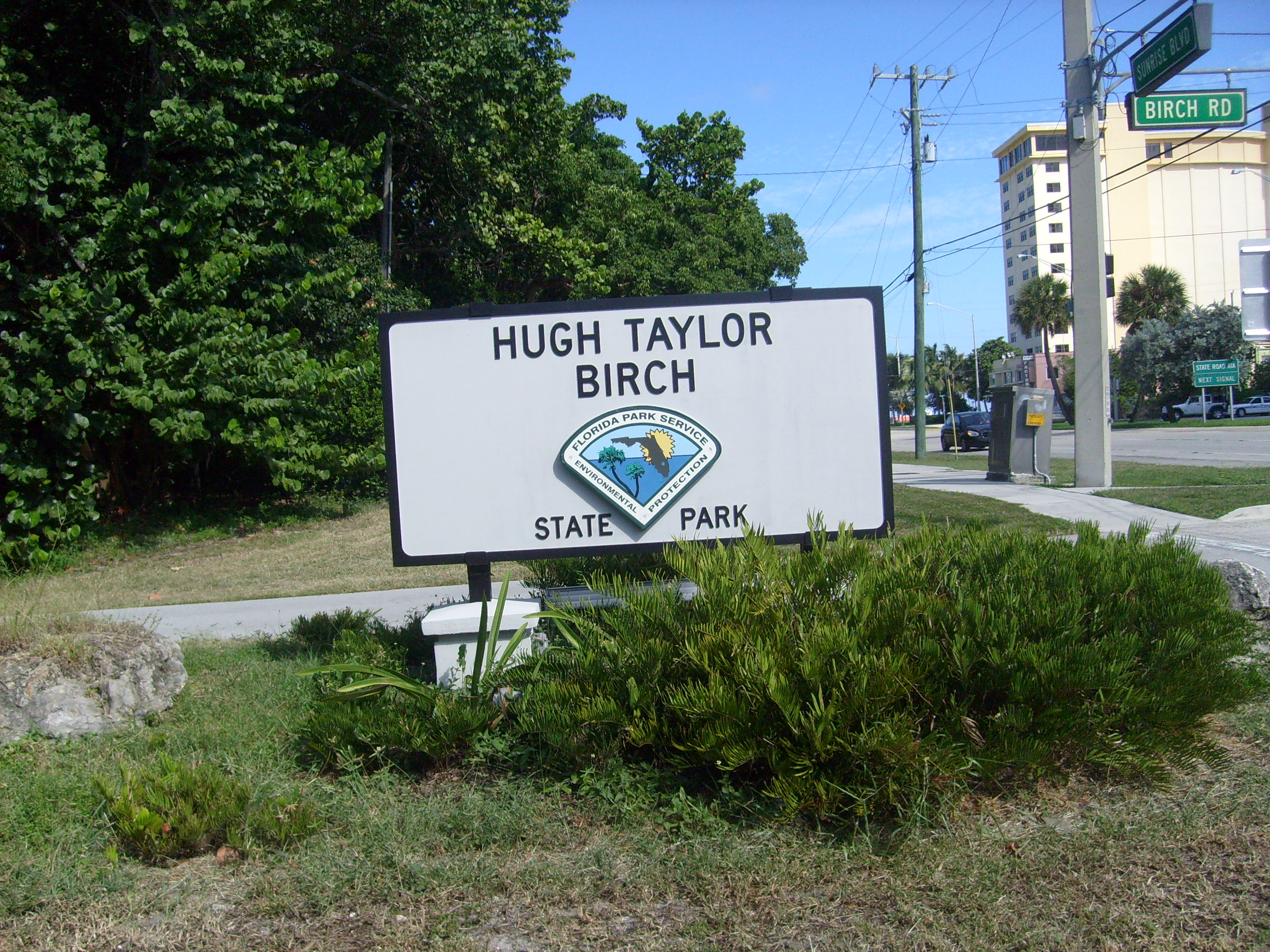
Entrance to the park

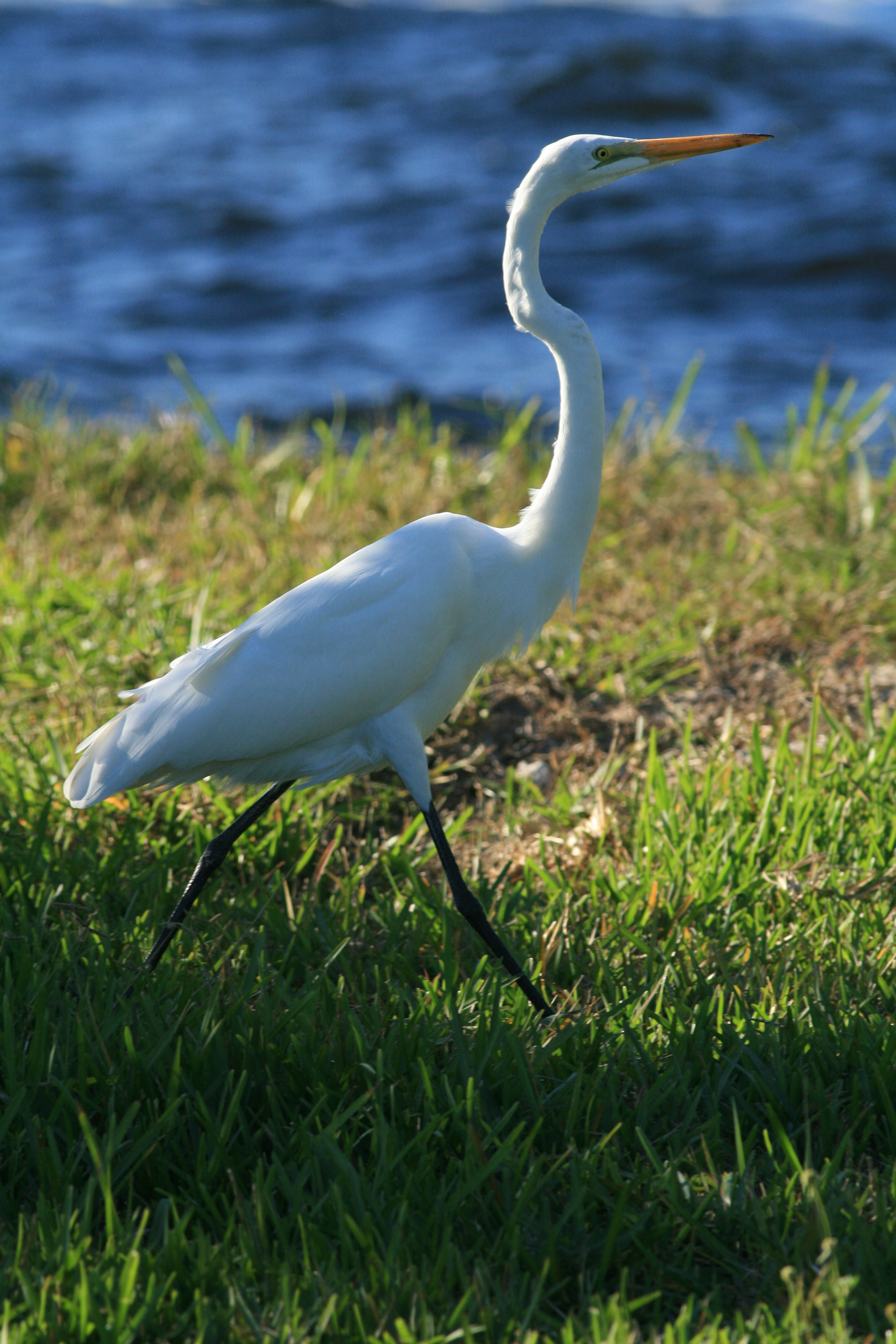
Great egret in the park

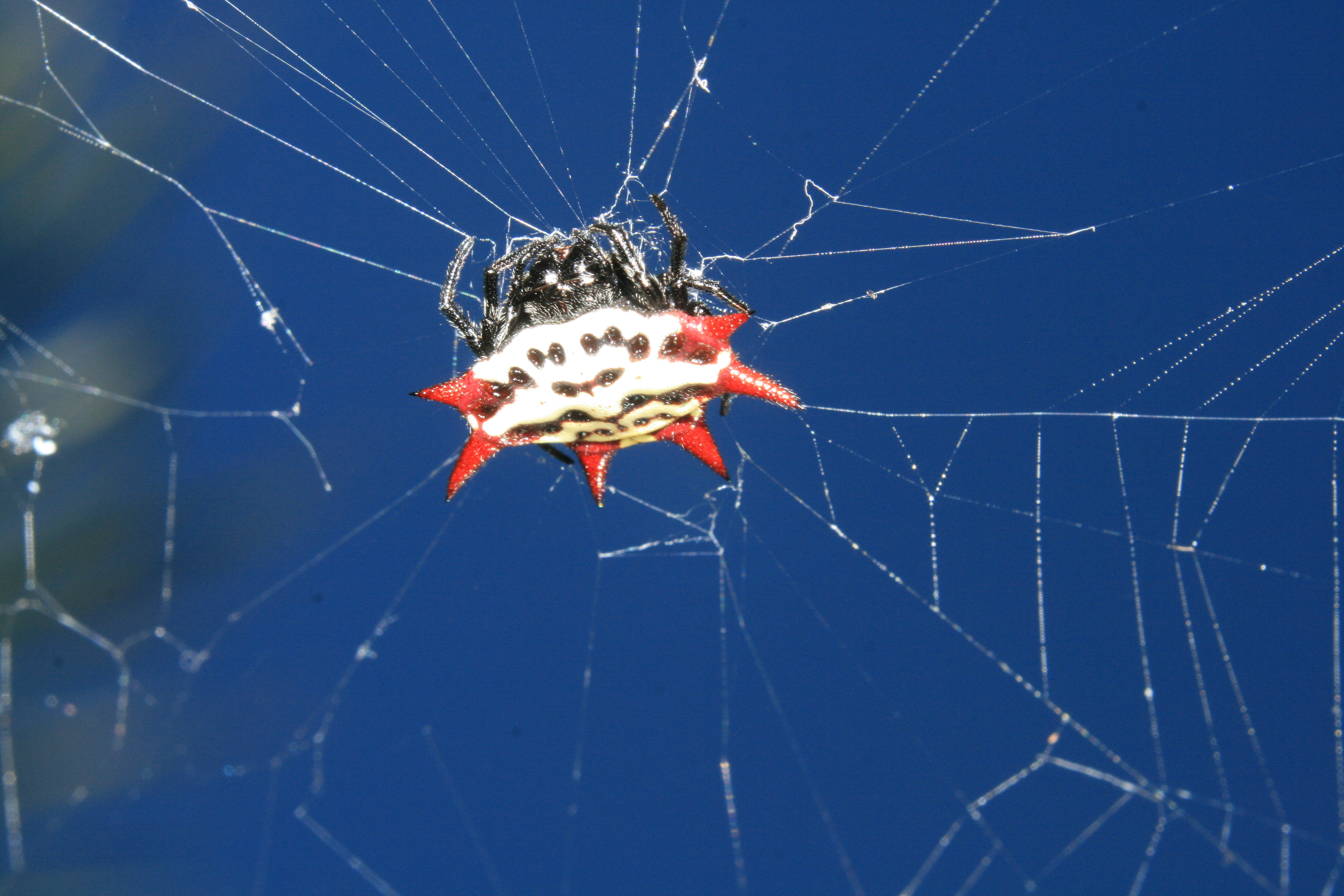
Orb-weaver spider

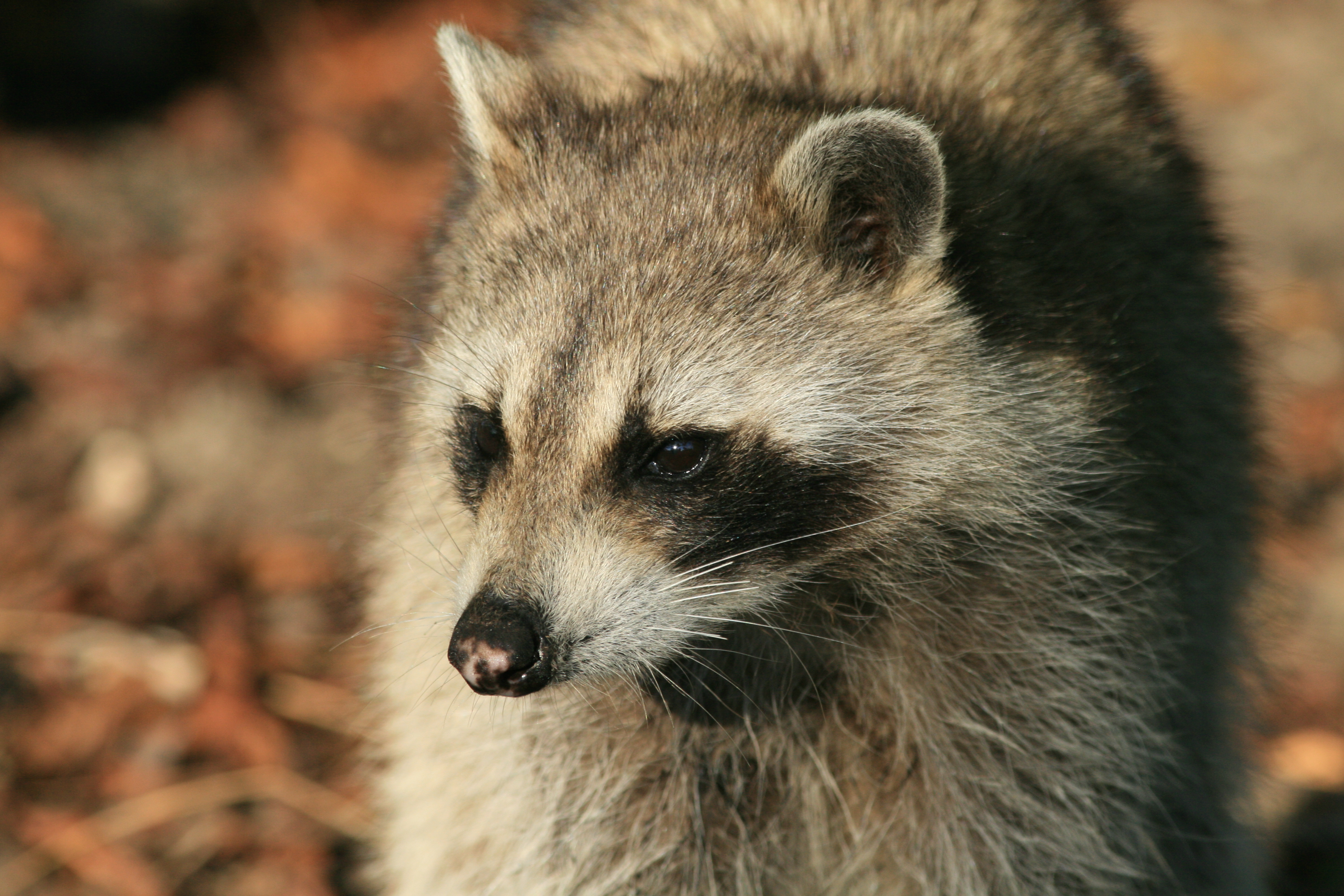
Raccoon
