= Oakland Park Boulevard =

Highway in Florida, United States

Oakland Park Boulevard
- State Road 816 and County Road 816
- SR 816 in red, CR 816 in blue

Route information
- Maintained by FDOT and Broward Public Works
- Length: 13.620 mi (21.919 km) 9.720 mi (15.643 km) as SR 816

Major junctions
- West end: SR 869 in Sunrise
- US 441 / SR 7 in Lauderdale Lakes; I-95 in Oakland Park; US 1 in Oakland Park
- East end: SR A1A in Fort Lauderdale

Location
- Country: United States
- State: Florida
- County: Broward

Highway system
- Florida State Highway System; Interstate; US; State; Former; Pre‑1945; Toll; Scenic
← SR 814	→ SR 817

State Road 816 (SR 816), locally known as Oakland Park Boulevard (OPB) is a 13.420-mile-long (21.597 km) east–west commercial and commuter road serving central Broward County, Florida, carrying the designations of SR 816 and County Road 816 (CR 816). It extends from the Sawgrass Expressway east to an intersection with SR A1A (Ocean Boulevard) in Fort Lauderdale.

== Route description ==
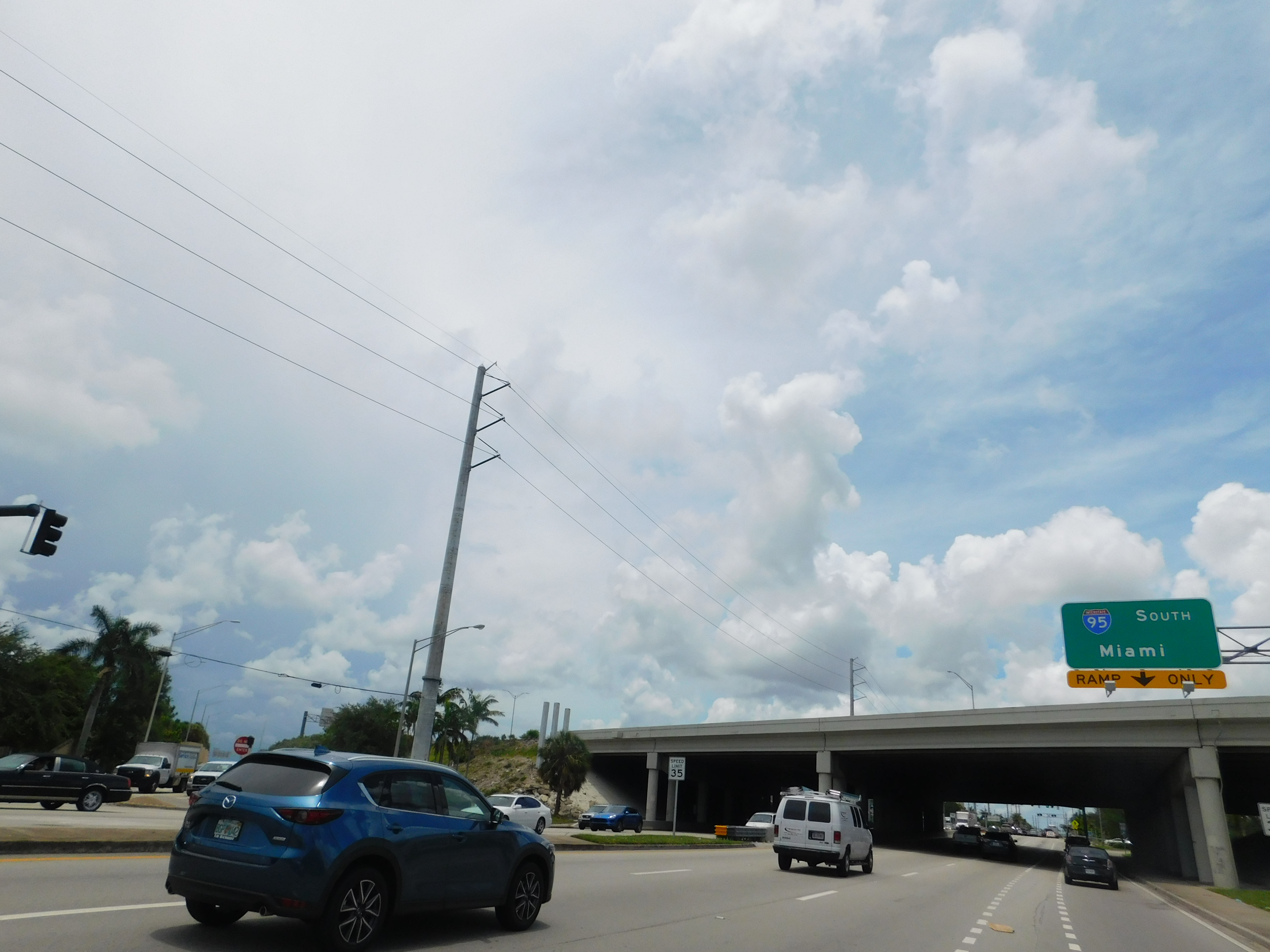
SR 816 westbound approaching I-95

Oakland Park Boulevard passes through mainly residential zones of Sunrise, Lauderhill, Lauderdale Lakes, Oakland Park, Wilton Manors, and Fort Lauderdale. It starts as a spur of exit 3 of the Sawgrass Expressway, and then merges with the northern terminus of Flamingo Road (SR 823) as it heads east.

After its intersection with University Drive, SR 816 continues for 2.3 miles (3.7 km), passing over Florida's Turnpike without an interchange at the border between Lauderhill and Lauderdale Lakes and intersects U.S. Route 441 (US 441; ) one mile (1.6 km) later.

After passing US 441, SR 816 enters the city of Oakland Park. For 2.6 miles (4.2 km), SR 816 passes through residential zones, with some businesses dotting the road, until its interchange with Interstate 95 (I-95). After I-95, SR 816 forms the border between Oakland Park and Wilton Manors for 1.2 miles (1.9 km), with an intersection with Powerline Road 0.2 miles (0.32 km) from the interchange. Soon after, SR 816 intersects the Dixie Highway, followed by an intersection with Federal Highway one mile (1.6 km) later as the road enters Fort Lauderdale. The Coral Ridge Mall is located at the northeast corner of the intersection with Federal Highway.

After Federal Highway, SR 816 continues for another mile before terminating at Ocean Boulevard (SR A1A).

== Major intersections ==
The entire route is in Broward County.

Location	mi	km	Destinations	Notes
Sunrise	0.0	0.0	SR 869 (Sawgrass Expressway) to I-75 – Miami, West Palm Beach	Tolled interchange; exit 3 on SR 869
Sunrise	0.4	0.64	Flamingo Road south (CR 823)	Northern terminus of CR 823
Sunrise	3.9 0.000	6.3 0.000	SR 817 (University Drive)	Transition from CR 816 to SR 816
Lauderdale Lakes	3.323	5.348	US 441 / SR 7	
Oakland Park	6.010	9.672	I-95 – West Palm Beach, Miami	Exit 31 on I-95 (unsigned SR 9)
Wilton Manors–Oakland Park line	6.352	10.223	SR 845 (Northwest 9th Avenue / Powerline Road)	
Wilton Manors–Oakland Park line	6.858	11.037	Andrews Avenue (CR 811A)	Former SR 811A
Oakland Park	7.775	12.513	SR 811 (Dixie Highway)	
Oakland Park–Fort Lauderdale line	8.696	13.995	US 1 (Federal Highway)	Unsigned SR 5
Fort Lauderdale	9.447– 9.533	15.203– 15.342	Intracoastal Waterway drawbridge	
Fort Lauderdale	9.720	15.643	SR A1A (Ocean Boulevard)	
1.000 mi = 1.609 km; 1.000 km = 0.621 mi: Electronic toll collection; Route transition
