= Sample Road =

Highway in Florida, United States

Sample Road
- State Road 834 and County Road 834
- SR 834 in red, CR 834 in blue, municipal portion in grey

Route information
- Maintained by FDOT and Broward County
- Length: 12.391 mi (19.941 km) 9.491 mi (15.274 km) as SR 834; 2.9 mi (4.67 km) as CR 834
- Existed: 1960 (As SR S-834)–present

Major junctions
- West end: SR 869 in Coral Springs
- US 441 / SR 7 in Coral Springs; Florida's Turnpike in Coconut Creek; I-95 in Pompano Beach
- East end: US 1 in Pompano Beach

Location
- Country: United States
- State: Florida
- County: Broward

Highway system
- Florida State Highway System; Interstate; US; State; Former; Pre‑1945; Toll; Scenic
← SR 833	→ SR 836

Sample Road, mostly signed as State Road 834 (SR 834), is a 12.391-mile-long (19.941 km) east–west commuter highway serving northern Broward County, Florida. It begins at an interchange with the Sawgrass Expressway in Coral Springs and ends at North Federal Highway (US 1) at the city limits boundary between Pompano Beach and Lighthouse Point. Eastbound travelers overshooting the SR 834 terminus find themselves on a 1-mile (1.6 km) 36th Street in Lighthouse Point, which dead-ends at a canal cut for the Intracoastal Waterway.

The westernmost 2.9 miles (4.7 km) of Sample Road are designated, but not signed, as County Road 834.

== Route description ==
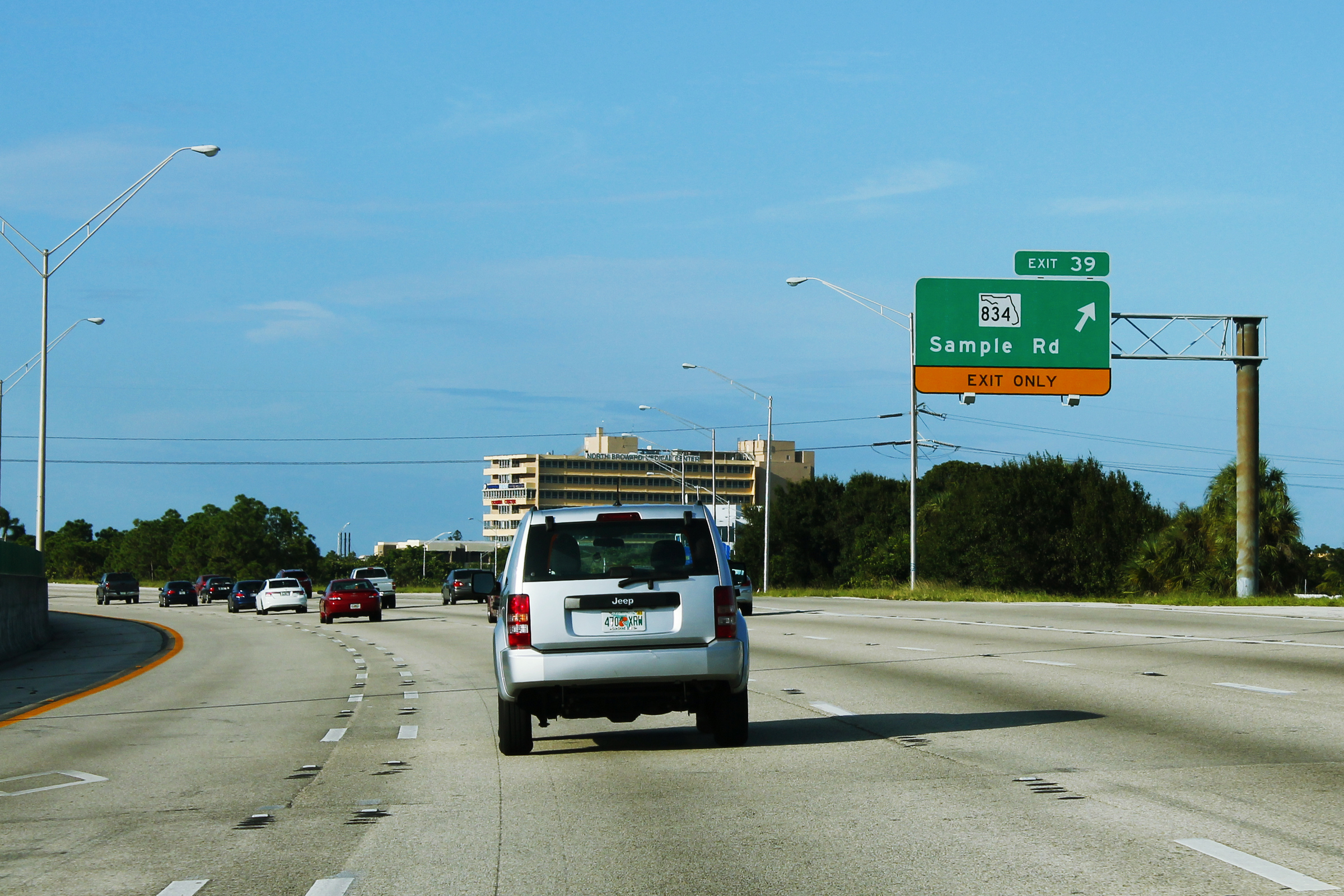
I-95 exit for SR 834

Like most major east-west throughways in Coral Springs, SR 834 begins at the Sawgrass Expressway (SR 869). The road heads east 2.9 miles (4.7 km) through primarily residential zones before its first major intersection with University Drive. After passing University Drive, SR 834 passes through more residential zones, with Coral Springs High School located 1.8 miles (2.9 km) east of the intersection.

SR 834 forms an interchange with US 441 (SR 7) where the city limits of Coral Springs, Margate, and Coconut Creek intersect. After the interchange, SR 834 forms the border between Margate and Coconut Creek for 0.6 miles (0.97 km) before completely entering Coconut Creek. The road then heads east, bisecting Tradewinds Park before its interchange with Florida's Turnpike.

After passing the Turnpike, SR 834 forms the northern border of Pompano Beach, and after intersecting Powerline Road, it also forms the southern border of Deerfield Beach. SR 834's next major intersection is with Interstate 95.

SR 834 has one more intersection with North Dixie Highway before the state road designation ends at its intersection with North Federal Highway. East of Federal Highway, the road continues east for about a mile before ending just before the Intracoastal Waterway.

== History ==
Sample Road was for several years designated as S-834, part of the Florida secondary highway system. In the 1980s, most secondary routes were given to the counties, but 834 was promoted to a primary route. Subsequently, the designation of the former primary SR 834 in Dade County was reassigned to the State Road 948 designation.

Sample Road is also mentioned in the hidden track of Nothing Gold Can Stay by Coral Springs natives New Found Glory.

== Major intersections ==
The entire route is in Broward County.

Location	mi	km	Destinations	Notes
	0.00	0.00	SR 869 (Sawgrass Expressway) to I-75 / Florida's Turnpike – Miami, Orlando	Exit 11 on SR 869; west end of CR 834
Coral Springs	2.90 0.000	4.67 0.000	SR 817 south (University Drive / CR 817 north) to SR 869 (Sawgrass Expressway)	West end of state maintenance
Coral Springs–Margate– Coconut Creek tripoint	3.02	4.86	US 441 (SR 7) to SR 869 (Sawgrass Expressway)	SPUI
Coconut Creek–Pompano Beach line	5.25	8.45	Florida's Turnpike – Orlando, Miami	Exit 69 on Turnpike
Pompano Beach–Deerfield Beach line	6.108	9.830	SR 845 (Powerline Road)	
Pompano Beach–Deerfield Beach line	7.116	11.452	Military Trail north / Andrews Avenue Extension south	
Pompano Beach–Deerfield Beach line	7.78	12.52	I-95 – West Palm Beach, Miami	Exit 39 on I-95
Pompano Beach–Deerfield Beach line	8.488	13.660	SR 811 (Dixie Highway)	
Pompano Beach–Lighthouse Point line	9.491	15.274	US 1 (Federal Highway)	
1.000 mi = 1.609 km; 1.000 km = 0.621 mi: Concurrency terminus; Electronic toll collection
