= Florida State Road 845 =

State highway in Florida, United States

State Road 845
- Powerline Road
- SR 845 highlighted in red

Route information
- Maintained by FDOT
- Length: 16.314 mi (26.255 km)

Major junctions
- South end: SR 838 in Fort Lauderdale
- SR 814 in Pompano Beach; SR 869 in Deerfield Beach
- North end: SR 808 in Boca Raton

Location
- Country: United States
- State: Florida
- Counties: Broward, Palm Beach

Highway system
- Florida State Highway System; Interstate; US; State; Former; Pre‑1945; Toll; Scenic
← SR 844	→ SR 847

State Road 845 (SR 845), locally known as Powerline Road, is a 16.314-mile-long (26.255 km) north–south divided highway serving northern Broward County and southern Palm Beach County, Florida, United States. The route extends from an intersection with Sunrise Boulevard (SR 838) near downtown Ft. Lauderdale, north to an intersection with Glades Road (SR 808) near Boca Raton.

Like Military Trail (SR 809) to the east, SR 845 is a major commuter highway paralleling Florida's Turnpike (SR 91) and Interstate 95 (I-95) and often used as an alternative for the often-congested expressways. The road received its name from the parallel high tension power lines for almost its entire length.

== Route description ==
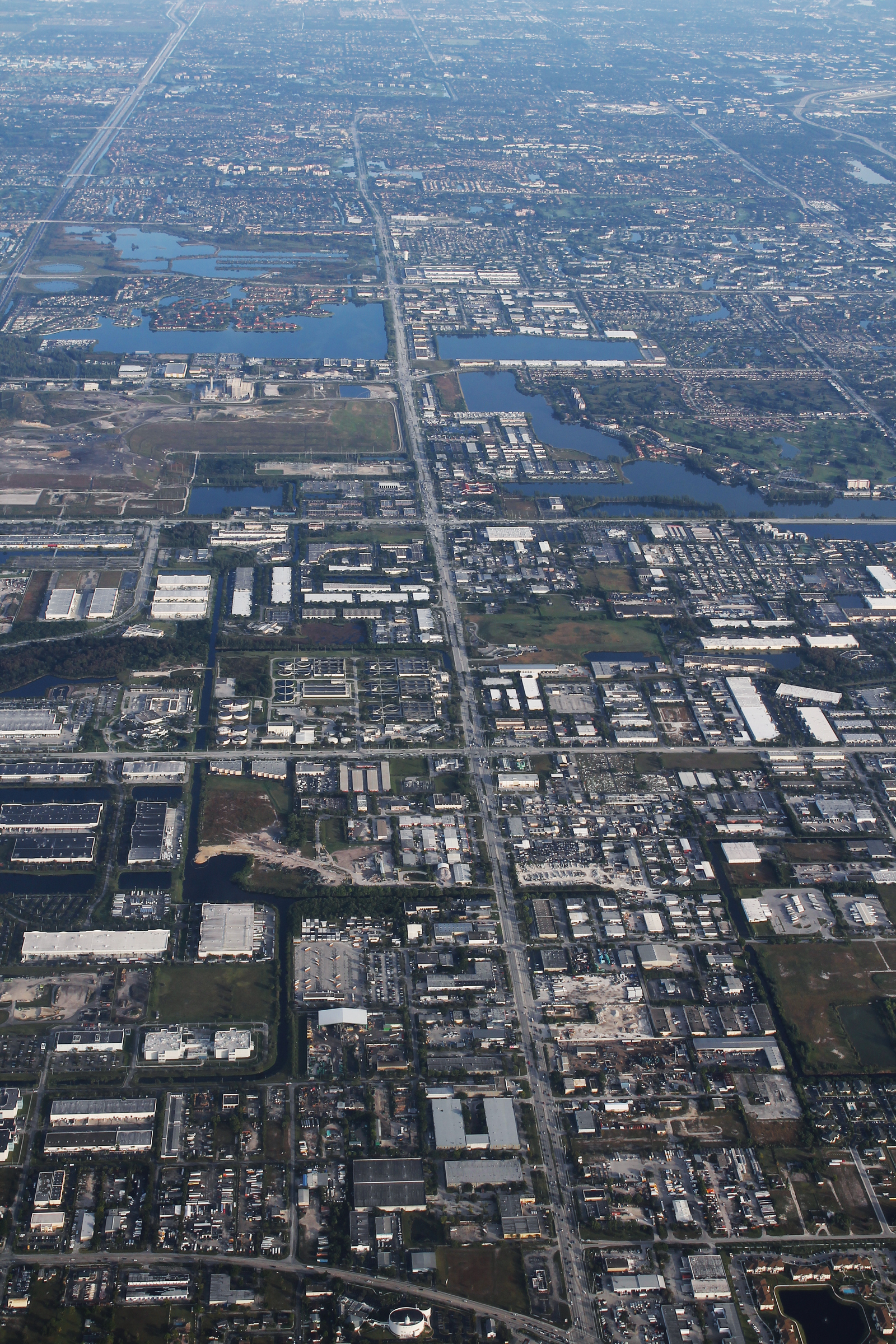
Aerial view of SR 845

SR 845 begins at an intersection with SR 838 (Sunrise Boulevard) in the city of Fort Lauderdale. SR 845 runs north along Powerline Road (NW 9th Avenue). The route is a four-lane road until the intersection with NW 13th Street, where it becomes six lanes. Crossing the South Fork Middle River, SR 845 crosses into Wilton Manors. Soon the road crosses into Oakland Park, where it reaches an intersection with SR 816 (Oakland Park Boulevard). A block west of SR 845 is an interchange with Interstate 95 (I-95) at exit 31. After crossing NW 40th Street, SR 845 crosses under I-95 and begins to parallel the freeway. The route crosses and parallels Tri-Rail tracks.

Crossing back into Fort Lauderdale, SR 845 reaches a junction with SR 870 (Commercial Boulevard). Just east of the intersection is exit 32 on I-95 and reaches an intersection with NW 59th Court, which connects to the Cypress Creek station of Tri-Rail. Soon SR 845 reaches Cypress Creek Road (County Road 840, CR 840), which connects to exit 33. The route passes west of Pompano Park Racetrack in Pompano Park. Crossing into Pompano Beach, SR 845 crosses SR 814 (Atlantic Boulevard). Continuing north, SR 845 crosses into Deerfield Beach and reaches a junction with SR 834 (Sample Road). Later, the road crosses at-grade with SR 869 (NW 10th Street), which connects to the Sawgrass Expressway, a toll road.

Reaching Butler's Corner, SR 845 reaches a junction with SR 810 (Hillsboro Boulevard). SR 810 is the last major junction in Deerfield Beach as the road crosses into Palm Beach County. Now in Boca Raton, the route continues north and reaches Palmetto Park Road (SR 798). After CR 798, the route bends northeast and soon northward to a junction with SR 808 (Glades Road). The junction with SR 808 marks the northern terminus of SR 845 and Powerline Road. Powerline continues north as Jog Road, which crosses through Palm Beach County.

== History ==
On December 19, 2017, the Palm Beach County Board of Commissioners approved a transfer agreement to submit to the Florida Department of Transportation (FDOT). The agreement relinquished the portion of SR 845 in Palm Beach County to county maintenance, relocating its northern terminus to the Broward–Palm Beach county line at the bridge over the Hillsboro Canal.

== Major intersections ==
County	Location	mi	km	Destinations	Notes
Broward	Fort Lauderdale	0.000	0.000	SR 838 (Sunrise Boulevard) to I-95 / Florida's Turnpike / SR A1A – Beaches	Southern terminus of SR 845
Broward	Wilton Manors–Oakland Park line	2.036	3.277	SR 816 (Oakland Park Boulevard) to I-95	
Broward	Oakland Park–Fort Lauderdale line	3.585	5.769	SR 870 (Commercial Boulevard) to I-95 / Florida's Turnpike	
Broward	Fort Lauderdale	4.589	7.385	Cypress Creek Road (CR 840) to I-95	
Broward	Pompano Beach	6.519	10.491	SR 814 (Atlantic Boulevard) to Florida's Turnpike	
Broward	Pompano Beach	8.631	13.890	Copans Road to I-95	
Broward	Pompano Beach–Deerfield Beach line	9.612	15.469	SR 834 (Sample Road) to Florida's Turnpike – Butterfly World	
Broward	Deerfield Beach	11.672	18.784	SR 869 (Southwest 10th Street) to SR 869 (Sawgrass Expressway) / I-75 – Coral Springs, Miami	
Broward	Deerfield Beach	12.605	20.286	SR 810 (Hillsboro Boulevard) to I-95	
Hillsboro Canal		13.295	21.396	Northern end of state maintenance	
Palm Beach	Boca Del Mar	14.850	23.899	Palmetto Park Road (CR 798) to I-95	
Palm Beach	Boca Raton	16.314	26.255	SR 808 (Glades Road) to Jog Road north / I-95 / Florida's Turnpike	
1.000 mi = 1.609 km; 1.000 km = 0.621 mi
