= Florida State Road 869 =

Highway in Florida

State Road 869
- SR 869 highlighted in red

Route information
- Maintained by FTE and FDOT
- Length: 23.987 mi (38.603 km) 21.242 mi (34.186 km) tolled expressway 2.745 mi (4.418 km) at-grade boulevard 1.4 mi (2.3 km) without designation
- Existed: July 3, 1986–present

Major junctions
- South end: I-75 / I-595 in Sunrise
- US 441 in Coconut Creek; Florida's Turnpike on Coconut Creek/Deerfield Beach line
- East end: I-95 in Deerfield Beach; US 1 in Deerfield Beach

Location
- Country: United States
- State: Florida
- Counties: Broward

Highway system
- Florida State Highway System; Interstate; US; State; Former; Pre‑1945; Toll; Scenic
← SR 867	→ SR 870

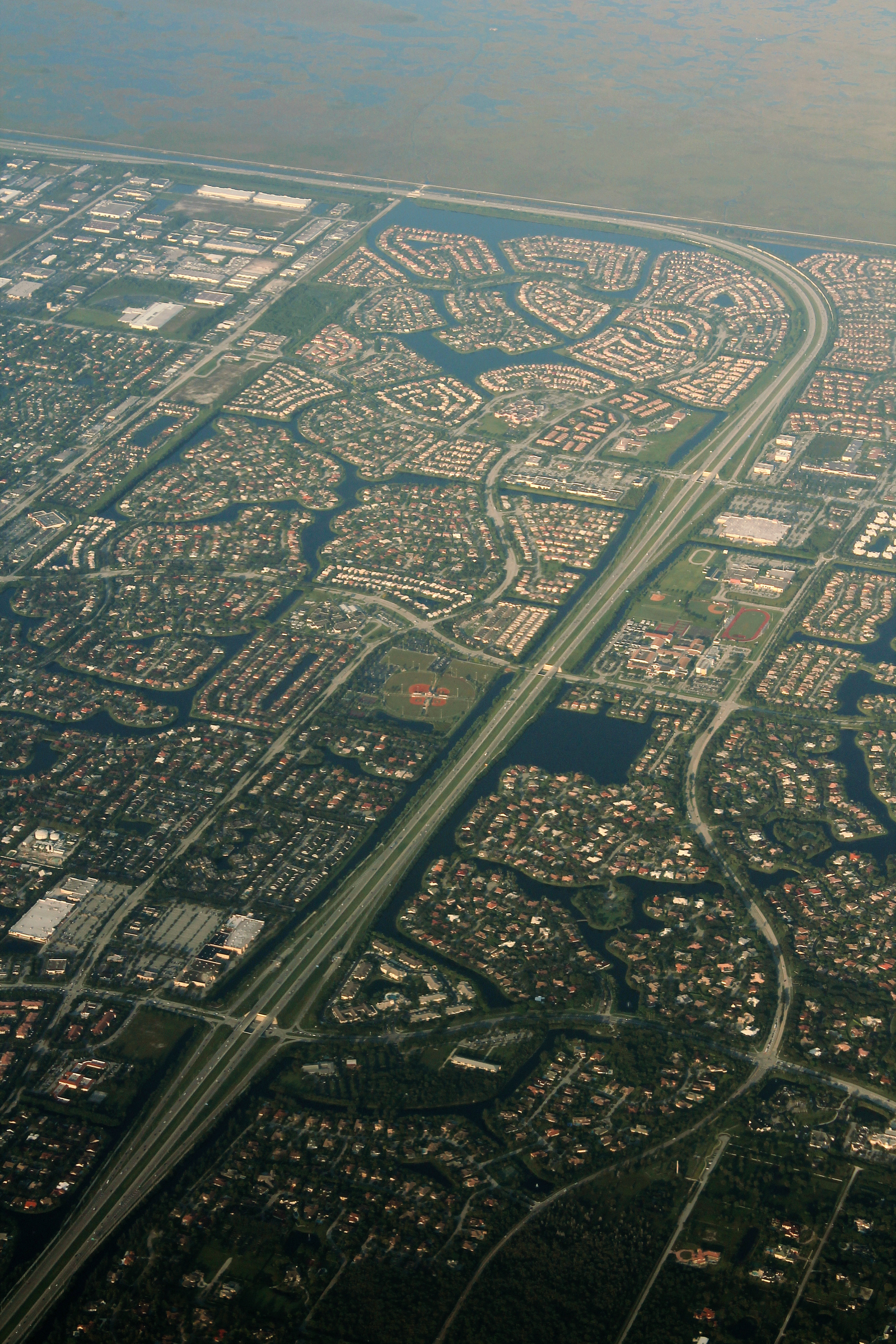
An aerial view of the road

Florida State Road 869 (SR 869) is a 24-mile-long (39 km) state road located in western and northern Broward County, acting as a de facto bypass of Fort Lauderdale as well as the northern coastal and southern parts of the county extending north from a junction of I-75 (SR 93), I-595 (SR 862) in Sunrise to Coral Springs where it heads eastward towards Florida's Turnpike and intersecting I-95 before terminating at Southwest 10th Avenue in Deerfield Beach. The 21.242-mile (34.186 km) section west of the Turnpike is known as the Sawgrass Expressway, a six-lane (soon to be ten-lane), controlled-access toll road; the 2.745-mile (4.418 km) section east of the Turnpike is a boulevard known as Southwest 10th Street. The expressway opened in 1986 and was added to Florida's Turnpike Enterprise in 1990. The at-grade section east of the Turnpike is maintained by FDOT.

== Route description ==
The highway begins in Sunrise at the northern part of the Sawgrass Interchange, with I-75 on the southern and western ends (I-75 "north" leads into Alligator Alley on the west side) and the Port Everglades Expressway (I-595) on the eastern end. For the first 12 miles, the Everglades lies to the west of the expressway while newer residential and commercial developments all lie to the east. After a welcome sign, the expressway passes its lone free interchange to Sunrise Boulevard (SR 838), connecting to the Sawgrass Mills mall and passing through the Sunrise Toll Gantry, the first of two toll gantries on the road before reaching the exit for the Amerant Bank Arena, where the Florida Panthers of the National Hockey League play; this interchange has no southbound exit. After intersecting with Oakland Park Boulevard (SR 816), it enters Tamarac by intersecting with Commercial Boulevard (SR 870) and then enters Coral Springs. After interchanges at Atlantic Blvd (SR 814) and Sample Road (SR 834), it curves 90 degrees east by switching to an east and west orientation with housing and other developments surrounding both sides of the highway. Still in Coral Springs, the highway's next interchange and last exit before additional tolls (both directions) is Coral Ridge Drive. Afterwards, it continues eastward, acting as the border between Parkland to the north of the expressway and Coral Springs to the south of it towards the interchange with University Drive (SR 817). Three miles east of this exit, the expressway has an interchange with US 441 / SR7, which forms the borders between Coconut Creek to the east and Parkland and Coral Springs to the west. The expressway then enters Coconut Creek at the interchange with an exit with Lyons Road before entering Deerfield Beach and approaching the Deerfield Toll Gantry just west of Florida's Turnpike.

After crossing the Turnpike, the tollway reverts to a six lane surface street, Southwest 10th Street, still heading east in Deerfield Beach. It has intersections with two residential streets before reaching Powerline Road (SR 845). East of Powerline Road, SR 869 passes by residential and commercial zones, crossing several local streets for the remainder of its length, with SR 869 intersecting Military Trail and I-95 about two miles east of Powerline Road and terminating at Southwest 6th Avenue about 0.4-mile (0.64 km) east of I-95. There have been plans to extend the expressway east of the Turnpike to I-95 since the early 1990s, but local opposition has prevented it from going forward. Plans were approved in 2018 to create elevated tolled express lanes, with construction expected to begin in 2024.

== Tolls ==
The Sawgrass Expressway is an all electronic, cashless toll road, using overhead toll gantries in the place of the former toll plazas. Users pay by either SunPass transponders or by a toll by plate system for a slightly higher fee. The cost to travel the entire expressway costs $2.32 with SunPass, and $2.90 with toll by plate as of May 2026. For travel over only part of the expressway, a graduated toll system is in place.

== History ==
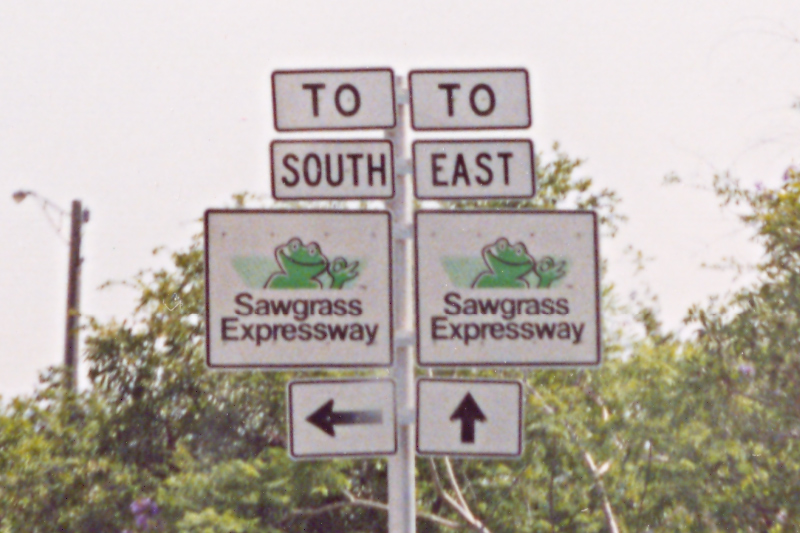
The original Sawgrass Expressway road signs

Originally planned to be the University-Deerfield Expressway when it was first proposed in 1960, it was supposed to be the northernmost part of a chain of expressways from Deerfield Beach to Coral Gables, but the proposed Snake Creek Expressway (in Broward County) became part of the Florida's Turnpike Extension and the LeJeune-Douglas Expressway (in Dade County) failed in the 1970s as the result of a county wide expressway revolt. On the other hand, the rerouting of Interstate 75 from the Tamiami Trail to Alligator Alley in 1973 increased the necessity of a northern/western bypass of Broward County and in 1983, the newly created Broward County Expressway Authority proposed the Sawgrass-Deerfield Expressway in its current alignment. A series of cost-cutting measures for the proposed toll road included removal of all planned rest stops and a shortening of the name of the road to Sawgrass Expressway. (A consultant stated in an interview, "Those overhead signs are damn expensive.")

The Sawgrass Expressway broke ground on November 2, 1984, and opened to traffic on July 3, 1986, at a cost of $200 million. The section between I-75 and Sunrise Boulevard opened on August 4, 1988. Bonds were sold in 1984 to finance construction and again in 1986 to partially refund the 1984 bonds. By 1990, however, the Sawgrass Expressway was plagued with a massive debt, light usage and was a subject of local political corruption. The Florida Department of Transportation purchased the Sawgrass Expressway from the Broward County Expressway Authority in December 1990 as part of the expansion program authorized by the Florida Legislature in 1990 Senate Bill 1316. When the highway was first built, it was criticized for being a "road to nowhere", as it passed through undeveloped areas for most of its length. The road's $1.50 toll in its first few years was another criticism by local residents, contributing to the road's light usage. Commercial and residential developments boomed along the toll road in the late '80s and throughout the '90s, making it suitable for commuters. The swampland west of the Expressway is an Everglades Water Conservation Area and unlikely to be developed in the foreseeable future.

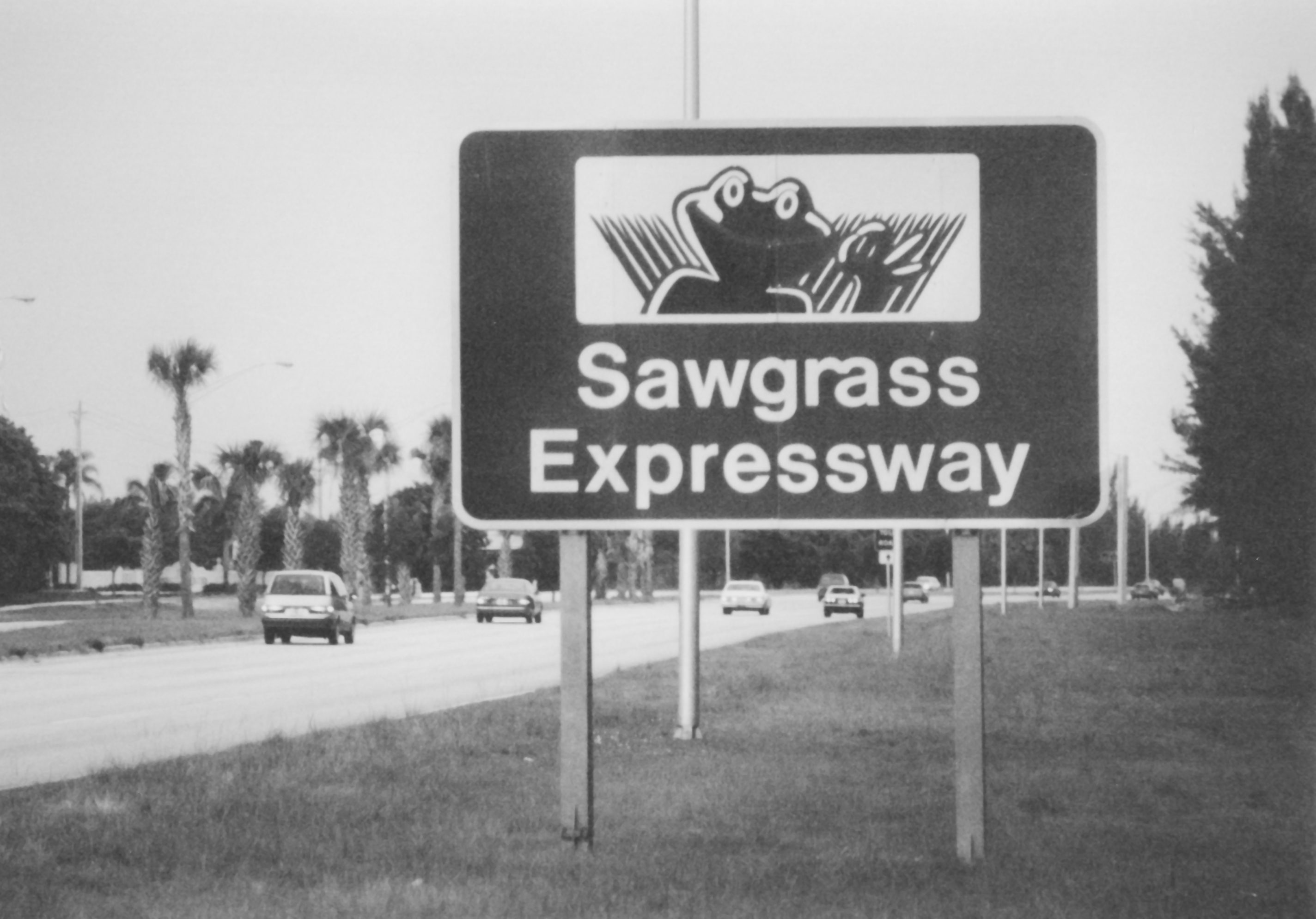
"Cecil B. Sawgrass", the Sawgrass Expressway's now-hard-to-find mascot. He was retired in 1995 when the expressway gained its state highway designation.

The Expressway, along with SW 10th Street west of I-95, was bannered as State Road 869 in 1995.

The Sawgrass Expressway experienced its first toll hike on March 7, 2004, increasing the toll rate for non SunPass users to $2.00 for travel over the entire expressway, with SunPass users still using the original toll rates.

Unlike most roads, the Sawgrass Expressway had a mascot, a swamp frog named Cecil B. Sawgrass, who appeared on signs greeting motorists entering the tollway southbound from State Road 845 (Powerline Road), as well as various road signs on the expressway. Signs featuring Cecil are becoming rare, as newer expressway signage uses only the standard TOLL 869 shield. In October 2005, Hurricane Wilma damaged the expressway's welcome sign, resulting in its removal during cleanup.

Between 2008 and 2009, the expressway was widened from four lanes to six lanes, and was converted to open-road tolling at the Sunrise and Deerfield toll plazas, as well as on exit and entrance ramps, eliminating the need for toll plazas for SunPass users on the toll road. Traditional toll booths for cash customers were still accessible on the right side of the plaza areas.

On June 24, 2012, toll rates were raised on the Sawgrass Expressway, with rates going up on average about a quarter at each tolling area for both cash and SunPass customers. Rates were risen slightly again for SunPass customers on July 1, 2013, with cash prices staying at their 2012 rates, and are the toll rates as of January 2014.

The Sawgrass Expressway eliminated cash tolls on April 19, 2014, charging vehicles by SunPass or license plate information. Toll gantries replaced the shuttered toll booths at plazas and exits.

The Sawgrass Expressway from Sunrise to Florida's Turnpike is being widened from six to 10 lanes in the mid to late 2020's.

As of 2024, the FDOT is in the design phase for the SW 10th Street Connector Project, which will provide elevated tolled express lanes and upgrade street level traffic, much like I-595 and SR 84, about 15 miles south. The connector was added to the Moving Florida Forward project in 2023. Construction is expected to start by 2026. The connector will carry the Sawgrass Expressway shield. After its estimated completion in 2032, the Sawgrass Expressway will be an expressway from Sunrise to I-95.

== Major intersections ==
The entire route is in Broward County.

Location	mi	km	Exit	Destinations	Notes
Sunrise–Weston– Davie tripoint	0.000	0.000		I-75 (Alligator Alley) – Miami, Naples, Weston	Exit 19 on I-75
Sunrise–Weston– Davie tripoint	0.000	0.000		I-595 east – Fort Lauderdale	Western terminus of I-595; to Fort Lauderdale International Airport and Port Everglades
Sunrise	0.500	0.805		Northwest 8th Street	Future tolled left exit interchange to be constructed during the mass widening project of the Sawgrass Expy
Sunrise	1.056	1.699	1	Sunrise Boulevard (CR 838)	Incorrectly signed as SR 838; Future Partial Diverging Diamond Interchange; to Sawgrass Mills
Sunrise	1.909	3.072	1B	Pat Salerno Drive	Incomplete tolled interchange; Northbound exit and southbound entrance only; Other movements to be constructed during the mass widening project of the Sawgrass Expy; to Sawgrass Mills and Amerant Bank Arena
Sunrise	2.000	3.219	Sunrise Toll Gantry		
Sunrise	3.309	5.325	3	Oakland Park Boulevard (CR 816) / Panther Parkway	Tolled southbound exit and northbound entrance; incorrectly signed as SR 816; Panther Parkway signed southbound with access via CR 823 (Flamingo Road); Future Partial Diverging Diamond Interchange; to Sawgrass Mills and Amerant Bank Arena
Sunrise–Tamarac line	5.466	8.797	5	Commercial Boulevard (CR 870)	Tolled southbound exit and northbound entrance; incorrectly signed as SR 870; Future Diverging Diamond Interchange
Coral Springs	8.213	13.218	8	Atlantic Boulevard (CR 814)	Tolled southbound exit and northbound entrance; incorrectly signed as SR 814
Coral Springs	10.931	17.592	11	Sample Road (CR 834)	Tolled southbound exit and northbound entrance; incorrectly signed as SR 834; Future Partial Diverging Diamond Interchange
Coral Springs–Parkland line	13.868	22.318	14	Coral Ridge Drive	Future Diverging Diamond Interchange
Coral Springs–Parkland line	15.623	25.143	15	CR 817 (University Drive)	Tolled northbound exit and southbound entrance; incorrectly signed as SR 817; to Coral Springs Center for the Arts and Broward Health Coral Springs
Coconut Creek	18.588	29.914	18	US 441 (SR 7)	Tolled northbound exit and southbound entrance; signed as exits 18A (south) and 18B (north)
Coconut Creek	20.092	32.335	19	Lyons Road	Tolled northbound exit and southbound entrance
Coconut Creek	20.500	32.992	Deerfield Gantry		
Coconut Creek	20.401	32.832	21	Florida's Turnpike – Miami, Orlando	Tolled eastbound exit and westbound entrance; signed as exits 21A (south) and 21B (north); unsigned SR 91
Deerfield Beach	21.242	34.186	Northern end of expressway section		
Deerfield Beach	21.835	35.140		SR 845 (Powerline Road)	
Deerfield Beach	23.262	37.437		Military Trail – Tri-Rail Station	Former SR 809
Deerfield Beach	23.871	38.417		I-95 / Southwest 10th Street east – Miami, West Palm Beach	Exit 41 on I-95; continues east without designation
1.000 mi = 1.609 km; 1.000 km = 0.621 mi: Electronic toll collection; Incomplete access
