= Florida State Road 7 =

State highway in Florida, United States

State Road 7

Route information
- Maintained by FDOT
- Length: 70.066 mi (112.760 km)
- Existed: 1945 renumbering (definition)–present

Major junctions
- South end: US 41 in Miami
- US 441 from Miami to Royal Palm Beach; US 27 / SR 25 in Miami; I-95 / SR 826 / Florida's Turnpike in Golden Glades; I-595 / SR 84 / Florida's Turnpike in Davie; SR 869 in Coconut Creek; US 98 / SR 80 in Royal Palm Beach
- North end: 60th Street in Loxahatchee

Location
- Country: United States
- State: Florida
- Counties: Miami-Dade, Broward, Palm Beach

Highway system
- Florida State Highway System; Interstate; US; State; Former; Pre‑1945; Toll; Scenic
← SR 6	→ SR 8

Florida State Road 7 (SR 7) is a major north–south artery in South Florida connecting U.S. Route 41 (US 41; unsigned SR 90) in the Little Havana section of Miami with 60th Street in Loxahatchee. All but the northernmost 6.5 miles (10.5 km) (in and near Royal Palm Beach) is instead (or additionally) signed as US 441, and has been since 1950.

== Route description ==
=== Miami-Dade ===
The state road begins at US 41, which is also the national southern terminus of US 441. The road in Miami-Dade County is only signed as US 441, with no indication of SR 7 anywhere. It is labeled Northwest 2nd Avenue north of the Golden Glades Interchange and Northwest 7th Avenue from the interchange south to the Miami River, after which it continues another dozen blocks to US 41 as Northwest and Southwest 8th Avenues.

In the city of Miami Gardens, a 0.358 mile frontage road runs along the southbound side of State Road 7 just south of Northwest 199th Street and ending at Northwest 193rd Street. This road carries the hidden designation of State Road 7F.

=== Broward ===
In Broward County, the road is only signed as US 441, but is indicated as "State Road 7" on green street signs when approaching the road from cross streets. From the Miami-Dade County line north to Stirling Road in Hollywood, it is also known as South 60th Avenue. In addition, Broward County addresses along the route show references to "State Road 7" and residents refer to the road as both "441" and "State Road 7". Many locations along State Road 7 in the cities of Plantation, Lauderhill and Lauderdale Lakes are addressed as "SW/NW 40th Avenue".

=== Palm Beach ===
The Palm Beach County stretch of US 441 / SR 7 features signs with both designations. Older maps also have the designation of "Range Line Road". In Royal Palm Beach, US 441 leaves the SR 7 indication behind, making a westward turn and overlapping US 98 / SR 80 as it approaches Belle Glade on the shore of Lake Okeechobee. The state road continues north, intersecting SR 704, and ends temporarily at 60th Street North near the Pond Cypress Natural Area. It picks up again south of CR 809A, heading north to terminate at Northlake Boulevard. The segment north of SR 704, currently maintained by Palm Beach County, is set to be transferred to the Florida Department of Transportation in a road swap for SR 850 and SR 845 within the county limits.

== History ==
In 2009, part of a long-awaited northern extension opened with a 3.5 miles (5.6 km) stretch from SR 704 to Persimmon Boulevard in The Acreage. Future plans have the road extending another four miles north to Northlake Boulevard near Palm Beach Gardens, but it was not anticipated to be completed until 2015. About 3/4 mile (1.2 km) has already been built at the Northlake Boulevard end, and is marked on street signs as State Road 7.

=== Controversy ===
Environmental groups argue that the extension of SR 7 just west of the Grassy Waters environmental preserve in Palm Beach County, also the source of the drinking water supply for the West Palm Beach region, threatens to damage critical habitat for several endangered species including the Everglades Snail Kite. As of 2005, only about 1,300 of the hawks were known to still be extant. Because of the potential impact on nesting Snail Kites and their habitat, The U.S. Fish and Wildlife Service has been urging the Florida Department of Transportation, since 2005, to reconsider the road placement through Grassy Waters Preserve. In its Biological Opinion issued on 13 November 2014, the USFWS stated "While the Service finds the project is unlikely to jeopardize the continued existence of the Everglade snail kite, based on the current small size of the snail kite population and the unknown, and potentially significant, effects of the project on the Everglade snail kite, the Service continues to urge the FDOT to eliminate the proposed corridor for the project and either adopt the “no build” alternative for the proposed roadway extension, or choose an alternative that does not impact the PCNA or GWP - such as an alignment west of the Ibis development." The Audubon Society lists the Snail Kite population as being in trouble since much of its habitat has been drained and remaining parts inundated to improper water levels needed to sustain the Apple snails on which it feeds. The SR7 expansion will exacerbate both issues by destroying habitat and changing water levels in the habitat bordering the road.

== Major intersections ==
County	Location	mi	km	Destinations	Notes
Palm Beach	Royal Palm Beach	63.580	102.322	US 98 / US 441 north / SR 80 (Southern Boulevard) to Florida's Turnpike / I-95 – Royal Palm Beach, Belle Glade, West Palm Beach	Interchange; north end of concurrency with US 441
Palm Beach	Royal Palm Beach	65.556	105.502	SR 704 east (Okeechobee Boulevard) to Florida's Turnpike / I-95 – Royal Palm Beach, West Palm Beach	West end of SR 704; former northern terminus
Palm Beach	The Acreage	68.966	110.990	Permission Boulevard	Former northern terminus
Palm Beach	Loxahatchee	70.066	112.760	60th Street North	Temporary northern terminus
Palm Beach	Palm Beach Gardens	74.150	119.333	CR 809A (Northlake Boulevard)	Proposed northern terminus
1.000 mi = 1.609 km; 1.000 km = 0.621 mi: Concurrency terminus; Unopened
