= Broward County Transit =

Public Transit agency in Broward County, Florida

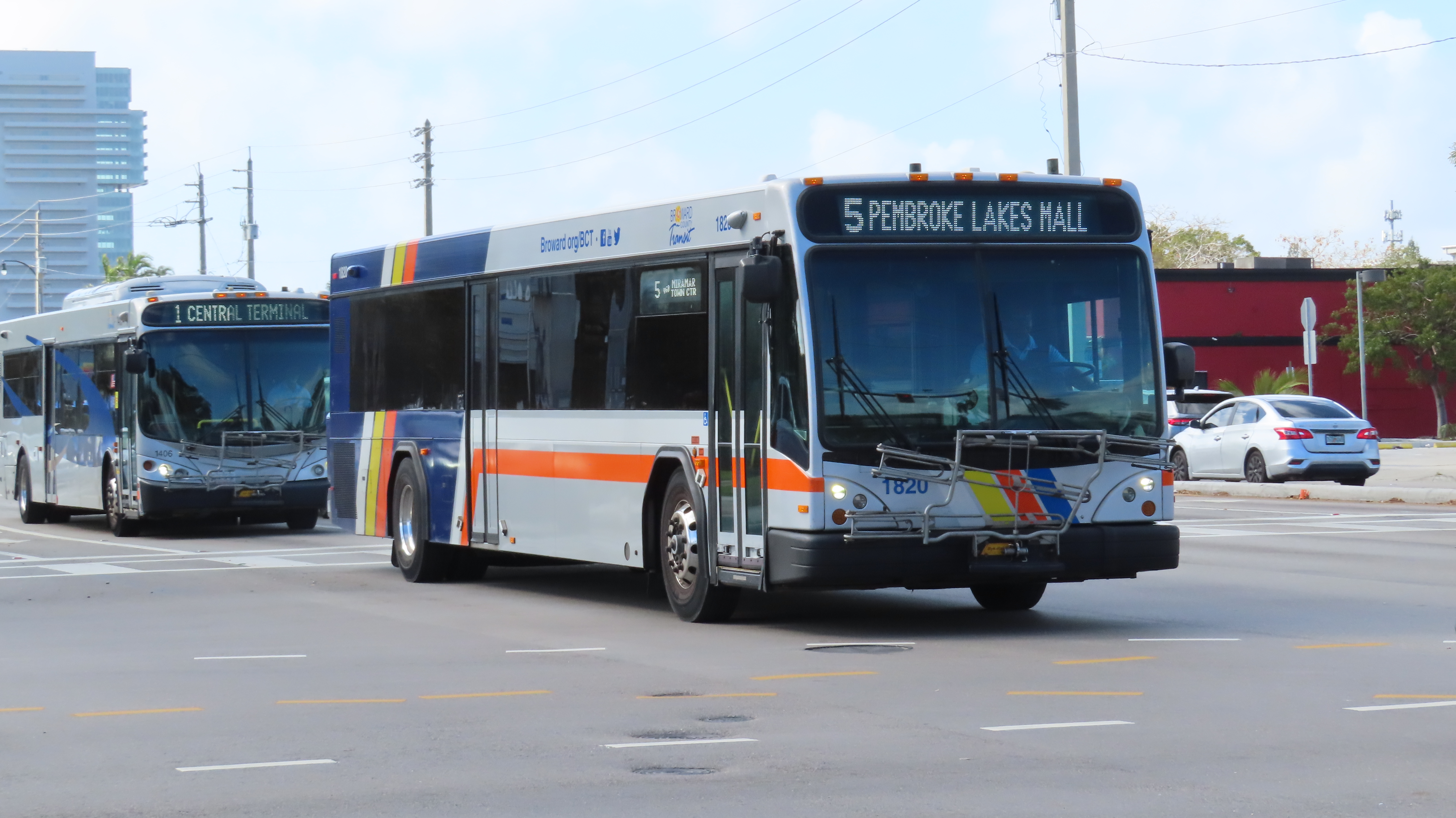
- Two Broward County Transit buses in Hallandale Beach
- Parent: Broward County
- Headquarters: 1 North University Drive, Plantation, Florida
- Service area: 410 square miles (1,100 km^{2})
- Service type: Bus, paratransit
- Routes: 44
- Stops: 4,800 (2025)
- Hubs: Broward Central Terminal, West Regional Bus Terminal, Northeast Transit Center
- Stations: Lauderhill Mall
- Depots: Pompano Beach
- Fleet: 415 (Fixed Route, 2024)
- Daily ridership: 74,000 (weekdays, Q2 2026)
- Annual ridership: 24,462,000 (2025)
- Fuel type: Diesel, Biodiesel, Diesel-Electric Hybrid, Battery-Electric
- Operator: Broward County Commission
- Chief executive: Coree Cuff Lonergan
- Website: broward.org/bct

Broward County Transit (BCT) is the main public transit operator in Broward County, Florida. It is the second-largest transit system in Florida (after Miami-Dade Transit), and has one of the highest rates of ridership per capita, and among the lowest costs per passenger, of metropolitan transit systems in the U.S. It operates as a division of the Broward County Board of County Commissioners, and its network extends into portions of Palm Beach County and Miami-Dade County, connecting to Miami-Dade Transit, Palm Tran, and Tri-Rail.

== Services ==
=== Local service ===
Broward County Transit's local service is focused mainly in Broward County, though select routes extend into Miami-Dade and Palm Beach Counties, connecting with Miami-Dade Transit and Palm Tran respectively.

| Route | Terminals | | | Primary streets traveled | Ridership (FY2026) | Service notes |
|---|---|---|---|---|---|---|
| 1 | Aventura; Aventura Mall | ↔ | Fort Lauderdale; Broward Central Terminal | Federal Highway | 1,267,052 | Connection to Miami-Dade Transit at Aventura Mall Connection to Fort Lauderdale International Airport |
| 2 | Miami Gardens; NW 207th Street | ↔ | Coral Springs; Westview Drive | University Drive | 1,068,006 | Connection to Miami-Dade Transit at NW 207th Street and NW 27th Avenue |
| 4 | Hallandale Beach; Hallandale Beach Boulevard & NE 14th Avenue | ↔ | Fort Lauderdale; Airport Tri-Rail Station | Ocean Drive, Dania Beach Boulevard | 134,373 | Contracted out route since January 18, 2026 |
| 5 | Pembroke Pines; Pembroke Lakes Mall | ↔ | Hallandale Beach; City Hall | Pembroke Road | 248,582 | |
| 6 | Hallandale Beach; County Line Road & Dixie Highway | ↔ | Fort Lauderdale; Broward Central Terminal | South 26th Avenue, North 24th Avenue, Anglers Avenue | 201,497 | Contracted out route since January 18, 2026 |
| 7 | Hallandale Beach; Pines Boulevard & NW 210th Avenue | ↔ | Hollywood; Young Circle | Pines Boulevard, Hollywood Boulevard | 551,058 | |
| 8 | Pembroke Pines; Pembroke Lakes Mall | ↔ | Hollywood; Young Circle | Taft Street | 126,032 | |
| 9 | Fort Lauderdale; Broward Central Terminal | ↔ | Hollywood; Young Circle | Davie Road, Johnson Street | 301,186 | |
| 10 | Fort Lauderdale; Broward Central Terminal | ↔ | Boca Raton; Mizner Park | Federal Highway | 720,634 | Connection to Palm Tran at Camino Real & Federal Highway |
| 11 | Tamarac; Commercial Boulevard & US 441/SR 7 | ↔ | Pompano Beach; Pompano Citi Centre | NW 21st Avenue, Las Olas Boulevard, Ocean Boulevard | 502,033 | |
| 12 | Plantation; West Regional Terminal | ↔ | Dania Beach; Dania Beach Pier | Sheridan Street | 360,276 | |
| 14 | Fort Lauderdale; Broward Central Terminal | ↔ | Deerfield Beach; Hillsboro Boulevard & Powerline Road | Powerline Road | 739,270 | |
| 15 | Pembroke Park; County Line Road & SW 52nd Avenue | ↔ | Fort Lauderdale; Airport Tri-Rail Station | 56th Avenue, Griffin Road | 18,882 | No weekend service; Contracted out route |
| 16 | Pembroke Pines; Pembroke Lakes Mall | ↔ | Dania Beach; Dania Beach City Hall | Stirling Road | 210,059 | |
| 18 | Golden Glades; Golden Glades Station | ↔ | Lauderhill; Lauderhill Mall | US 441 (SR 7) | 1,423,595 | Connection to Miami-Dade Transit at Golden Glades |
| 19 | Boca Raton; Sandalfoot Boulevard & US 441 | ↔ | Lauderhill; Lauderhill Mall | US 441 (SR 7) | 1,884,899 | Connection to Palm Tran at Sandalfoot Boulevard |
| 20 | Fort Lauderdale; Broward Central Terminal | ↔ | Deerfield Beach; NE 3rd Avenue & Sample Road | NE 15th Avenue, Cypress Road | 195,874 | |
| 22 | Fort Lauderdale; Broward Central Terminal | ↔ | Sunrise; Sawgrass Mills | Broward Boulevard | 760,855 | |
| 23 | Pembroke Pines; Pembroke Lakes Mall | ↔ | Sunrise; Sawgrass Mills | Weston Road | 33,718 | No weekend service; Contracted out route |
| 28 | Miramar; Memorial Hospital Miramar | ↔ | Aventura; Aventura Mall | Miramar Parkway, Hallandale Beach Boulevard | 864,481 | Connection to Miami-Dade Transit at Aventura Mall |
| 30 | Plantation; West Regional Terminal | ↔ | Fort Lauderdale; Broward Central Terminal | Peters Road, Davie Boulevard | 334,292 | |
| 31 | Coconut Creek; Hillsboro Boulevard & Lyons Road | ↔ | Fort Lauderdale; Broward Central Terminal | NW 31st Avenue, Lyons Road | 605,030 | |
| 34 | Coral Springs; Sample Road & Coral Ridge Drive | ↔ | Pompano Beach; Sample Road & Federal Highway | Sample Road | 550,494 | |
| 36 | Sunrise; Sawgrass Mills | ↔ | Fort Lauderdale; Sunrise & Fort Lauderdale Beach Boulevards | Sunrise Boulevard | 934,755 | |
| 40 | Lauderhill; Lauderhill Mall | ↔ | Fort Lauderdale; Galleria Mall | Sistrunk Boulevard, SE 17th Street, Seabreeze Boulevard | 748,939 | |
| 42 | Coral Springs; Atlantic Boulevard & Coral Ridge Drive | ↔ | Fort Lauderdale; Atlantic Boulevard & Ocean Boulevard | Atlantic Boulevard | 369,811 | |
| 48 | Coconut Creek; Johnson Road & US 441 | ↔ | Deerfield Beach; Hillsboro Boulevard & Ocean Boulevard | Hillsboro Boulevard | 157,536 | Connection to Palm Tran at The Cove Shopping Center |
| 50 | Fort Lauderdale; Broward Central Terminal | ↔ | Deerfield Beach; Hillsboro Boulevard & SW 3rd Avenue | Dixie Highway | 683,723 | |
| 55 | Sunrise; Hiatus Road | ↔ | Lauderdale-by-the-Sea; Galt Ocean Mile | Commercial Boulevard | 540,161 | |
| 56 | Sunrise; Welleby Plaza | ↔ | Lauderdale Lakes; Jacaranda Plaza | Sunrise Lakes Boulevard | 70,207 | Shuttle service |
| 60 | Fort Lauderdale; Broward Central Terminal | ↔ | Margate; US 441 & NW 15th Street | Andrews Avenue, Dr. Martin Luther King Jr. Boulevard, Coconut Creek Parkway | 652,333 | |
| 62 | Coral Springs; Westview & University Drives | ↔ | Pompano Beach; McNab Road & Federal Highway | Riverside Drive, McNab Road, Cypress Creek Road | 621,231 | |
| 72 | Sunrise; Sawgrass Mills | ↔ | Lauderdale-by-the-Sea; Galt Ocean Mile | Oakland Park Boulevard | 1,604,974 | |
| 81 | Plantation; West Regional Terminal | ↔ | Fort Lauderdale; Broward Central Terminal | Sunset Strip, NW 56th Avenue, Broward Boulevard | 945,440 | |
| 83 | Coral Springs; Coral Ridge Drive & Sample Road | ↔ | Pompano Beach; Pompano Citi Centre | Royal Palm Boulevard, Copans Road | 199,065 | |
| 88 | Plantation; West Regional Terminal | ↔ | Parkland; Holmberg Road & Coral Ridge Drive | Pine Island Road, Coral Springs Drive | 164,630 | |

=== The Breeze ===
The Breeze routes operate only weekdays, providing limited-stop service on corridors served by other local bus routes.

| Route | Name | Terminals | | | Primary streets traveled | Ridership (FY2026) | Service notes |
|---|---|---|---|---|---|---|---|
| 101 | US 1 Breeze | Aventura; Aventura Mall | ↔ | Fort Lauderdale; Broward Central Terminal | Federal Highway | 93,243 | Connection to Miami-Dade Transit at Aventura Mall |
| 441 | 441 Breeze | Golden Glades; Golden Glades Station | ↔ | Coconut Creek; US 441 & Turtle Creek Drive | US 441 | 268,014 | Connection to Miami-Dade Transit at Golden Glades |

=== Express service ===
Express service traverse interstate highways, connecting park and ride locations in Broward County with Downtown Miami and Miami International Airport. These routes operate during weekday peak periods only. They are primarily operated using MCI D4500CT motor coaches, and carry a surcharge of $0.65 ($0.30 for youth, senior, and disabled riders).

| Route | Name | Terminals | | | Primary streets traveled | Ridership (FY2026) | Service notes |
|---|---|---|---|---|---|---|---|
| 106 | 95 Express Miramar | Miramar; Miramar Regional Park | ↔ | Civic Center, Miami; NW 14th Street & NW 12th Avenue or Culmer Metrorail Station | I-95 | 70,066 | |
| 108 | 95 Express Miramar/Civic Center | Miramar; Miramar Park & Ride | ↔ | Civic Center, Miami; NW 14th Street & NW 12th Avenue or Culmer Metrorail Station | I-95 | 94,160 | |
| 109 | 95 Express Pembroke Pines/Miramar | Pembroke Pines; C.B. Smith Park & Ride | ↔ | Brickell, Miami; SE 13th Street & Brickell Avenue or Brickell Metromover Station | I-95 | 84,558 | |
| 110 | 595 Express | Sunrise; FLA Live Arena Park & Ride | ↔ | Brickell, Miami; SE 13th Street & Brickell Avenue or Brickell Metromover Station | I-595, I-95 | 54,409 | |
| 114 | 595 Express | Sunrise; FLA Live Arena Park & Ride | ↔ | Civic Center, Miami; NW 14th Street & NW 12th Avenue or Culmer Metrorail Station | I-595, I-95 | 95,633 | |
| 115 | 75 Express | Miramar; Miramar Park & Ride | ↔ | Miami Intermodal Center | I-75 | 5,463 | Reinstated on October 28, 2024 after being suspended on August 21, 2020 due to low ridership. |

Paratransit and community bus service: Paratransit services are available for disabled riders and senior citizens. Community Buses operate special routes as an extension of the local bus service in Broward County.

== Fleet ==
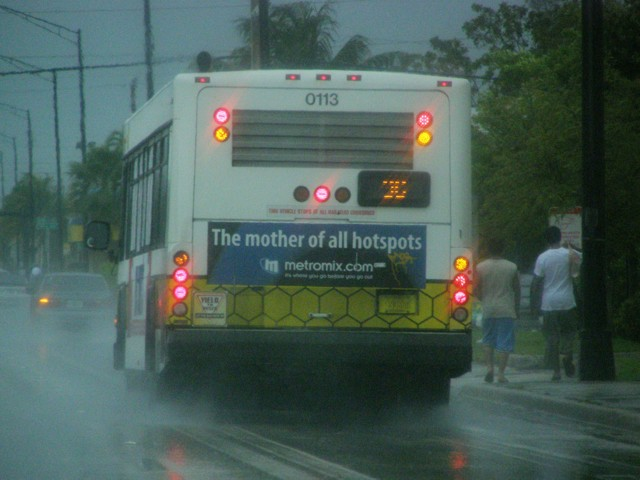
A Broward County Transit bus in its previous honeycomb livery. The bus has since been retired.

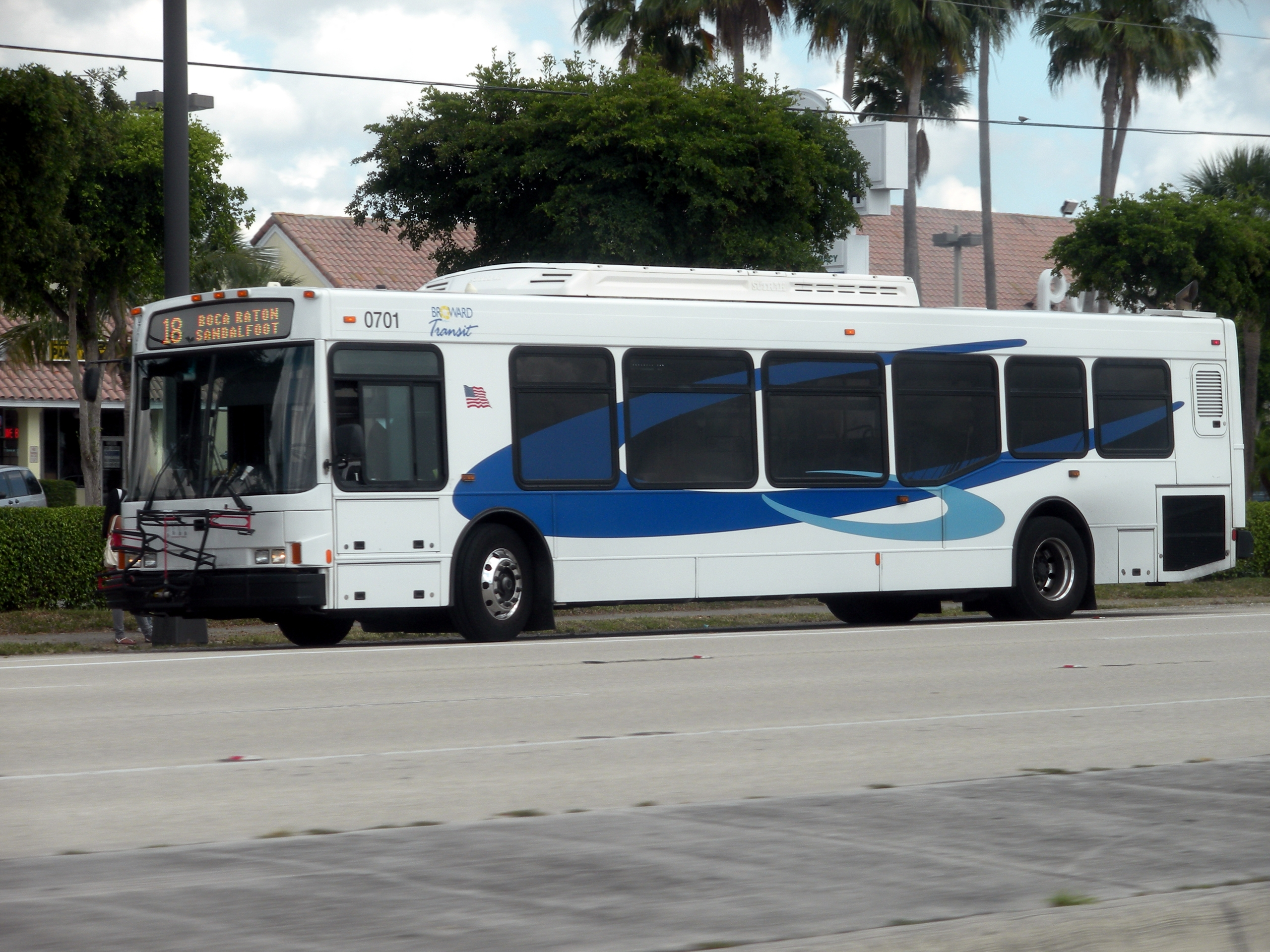
A Broward County Transit bus in the original Breeze livery. The bus has since been retired.

Since 2000, BCT has developed themed liveries for each new fleet order. The previous generation, introduced in the early 1980s, did not have a name.

=== Bee Line generation ===
The Bee Line generation was first introduced in 1997, replacing older high-floor buses decorated with a split orange and blue stripe around the side. These low-floor buses were painted white with a yellow honeycomb pattern stripe on all sides. A cartoon bee character was also placed on each bus, and was later removed.

=== The Breeze generation ===
The Breeze generation was introduced in 2007 for two special limited-stop service routes on US 1 and US 441/SR 7, traversing from northern Broward County to northern Miami-Dade County. BCT has now added 48 40 ft (12 m) NABI 40-LFW buses to the fleet. BCT introduced six New Flyer D60LFR articulated buses for service on the US 441/SR 7 route. The new buses also feature free Wi-Fi to riders.

The Breeze generation 2007-2018 buses were originally painted in white with two blue arcs, one light and one dark. Later buses ordered and some of the older buses were painted in silver with two blue arcs, one light and one dark.

In 2008, BCT ordered 42 newly restyled 40 ft (12 m) low-floor NABIs, including 12 hybrid buses.

=== Current livery ===
The current livery was introduced in 2020 as part of the penny tax, also known as Penny for Transportation. The livery consists of the front and sides of the buses being painted silver with an orange and white stripe running across the side of the bus with the back of the bus being painted blue. The Broward County colors of orange, yellow, and white are shown via diagonal stripes parallel to each other on the front and rear quarter panels off the bus.

This paint scheme was introduced on BCT's 147 2020 Gillig BRT buses.

=== Battery electric ===
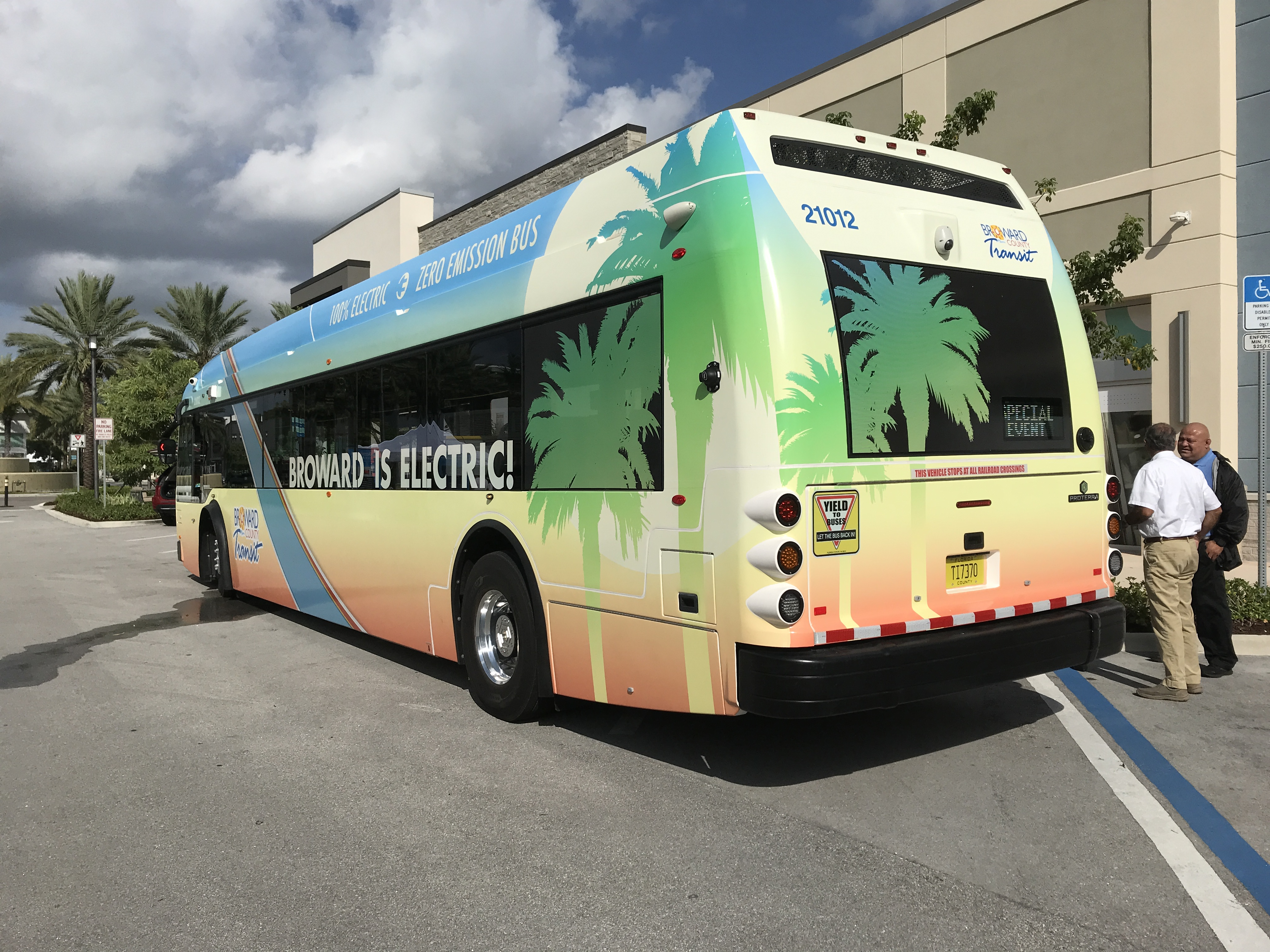
Broward County Transit's Proterra electric bus at a special event.

Broward County ordered 42 battery electric buses from Proterra for $54 million. Proterra only delivered 21 of the 42 buses before going bankrupt. Buses that were delivered broke down every 600 miles on average, and are not often put into service. Additionally, during the month of February 2025, none of the buses were able to be put into use.Overall, the implemented use of electric buses has had a limited impact on the community. Although, due to the breakdowns these buses have experienced, there has been a need for further services upgrades. In addition, Broward County purchased two battery electric motorcoaches from MCI for the 95 Express commuter service.

== Expansion ==
In 2024, Jacobs Solutions signed a 30-year, $4.4 billion contract with BCT to enhance and expand public transit services.

=== Fort Lauderdale-Hollywood International Airport to Port Everglades ===
Jacobs Solutions will design and build a light rail system that will connect Fort Lauderdale-Hollywood International Airport to Port Everglades. This will be a 5-year, $17.5 million project.

=== Vehicle replacement and expansion ===
Between 2025 and 2034, BCT plans to replace 449 vehicles and expand its fleet by 114 new vehicles, resulting in a total projected fleet size of 529 vehicles by 2034. The expansion includes vehicles for both fixed-route and express route services, with replacements scheduled annually to phase out aging units.

=== Proposed rail construction ===
Several light rail and people mover routes have been proposed in Broward County, such as the cancelled Wave Streetcar from the 2010s, which would have served downtown Fort Lauderdale, as well as the newer PREMO Light Rail between the airport and Port Everglades, and people movers proposed within the airport. Additionally, Broward Commuter Rail is a proposed service for a commuter rail service known as Coastal Link passing through the county on the Florida East Coast Railway line that also carries Brightline.

== See also ==
- Transportation in South Florida
- PREMO Light Rail
