= Florida State Road 858 =

State highway in Florida, United States

State Road 858
- Hallandale Beach Boulevard
- CR 858 in blue, SR 858 in red

Route information
- Maintained by FDOT
- Length: 5.429 mi (8.737 km)
- Existed: 1945 (as SR 824), 1983 (as SR 858)–present

Major junctions
- West end: US 441 in West Park
- I-95 near Pembroke Park; US 1 in Hallandale Beach
- East end: SR A1A in Hallandale Beach

Location
- Country: United States
- State: Florida
- Counties: Broward

Highway system
- Florida State Highway System; Interstate; US; State; Former; Pre‑1945; Toll; Scenic
← SR 856	→ SR 860

State Road 858 (SR 858), known locally as Hallandale Beach Boulevard, is a 5.429-mile-long (8.737 km) divided highway in southern Broward County, Florida. Its western terminus is an intersection with U.S. Route 441 (US 441 or SR 7) at the border between Miramar and West Park; its eastern terminus is an intersection with South Ocean Drive (SR A1A) on the boundary between Hallandale Beach and Hollywood, just east of the Intracoastal Waterway. SR 858 is the latitudinal baseline for Hallandale Beach's street grid.

== Route description ==
State Road 858 begins at the eastern end of the intersection between US 441 (State Road 7), with Miramar Parkway to the west and Hallandale Beach Boulevard to the east at the border between Miramar and West Park. SR 858 takes Hallandale Beach Boulevard east into West Park as a mostly commercial road. At 56th Avenue, the road leaves West Park and enters Pembroke Park, continuing in a blend of residential and commercial properties, including mobile homes. SR 858 then has an interchange with Interstate 95 (I-95), where to the east of the interchange, SR 858 enters Hallandale Beach, and becomes an almost purely commercial road for the rest of the road. The road then crosses the Dixie Highway and the Florida East Coast Railroad, and then passes by the northern end of the Gulfstream Park Race Track just east of the intersection of South Federal Highway (US 1/SR 5). Between Federal Highway and the eastern terminus, the road passes through several shopping centers, crossing the Intracoastal Waterway on a drawbridge one block west of SR A1A, the eastern terminus of SR 858, one block west of the ocean and just south of Hollywood.

West of SR 858's western terminus, the road has a hidden designation of County Road 858, and is known locally as Miramar Parkway, with the entire county road being located in Miramar. The County Road designation extends 9 miles (14 km) to the west as a mostly residential road, crossing Florida's Turnpike without an interchange, intersections with University Drive (SR 817) and Red Road (SR 823). The county road designation ends at an interchange with Interstate 75 (SR 93). Miramar Parkway continues an additional 2.5 miles (4.0 km) westward, until the road ends in a residential development west of Southwest 184th Avenue.

== History ==
Originally, Hallandale Beach Boulevard was State Road 824, established since the 1945 renumbering, extending from US 441 to SR A1A, and was State Road 394 prior to 1945. It also had an auxiliary road, State Road 824A, 1.2 miles to the north, locally known as Pembroke Road.

As part of a statewide reorganization, the Florida Department of Transportation transferred the SR 824 signage to a longer stretch of Pembroke Road and assigned State Road 858 to Hallandale Beach Boulevard (despite SR 852 and SR 854 being to the south). At the same time, the SR 858 designation was transferred from Oil Well Road in Collier County that extended westward from Sunnyland Station on the Collier-Hendry County boundary line.

At one point, the entire length of SR 858 was to be upgraded to become the Snake Creek Expressway, but eventually, the plans changed to where the expressway was shifted just south to become the Broward County portion of the Homestead Extension of Florida's Turnpike.

While the land along the western two-thirds of Miramar Parkway is in the process of development as the population of southwestern Broward County has been undergoing rapid growth since the late 1980s, the neighborhoods along the eastern part (including CR 858) are now fully constructed as suburban housing, which continues along most of SR 858 west of the Dixie Highway (which had the designation of SR 5A until the 1990s).

== Major intersections ==
The entire route is in Broward County.

Location	mi	km	Destinations	Notes
Miramar–West Park line	0.000	0.000	US 441 (SR 7) / CR 858 west (Miramar Parkway) to I-75	Western terminus of SR 858; continues westward as CR 858
Pembroke Park–Hallandale Beach line	2.55	4.10	I-95 (SR 9) – West Palm Beach, Miami	Exit 18 (I-95)
Hallandale Beach	3.632	5.845	Dixie Highway (CR 5A south)	
Hallandale Beach	3.999	6.436	US 1 (Federal Highway / SR 5)	
Hallandale Beach / Hollywood	5.241– 5.389	8.435– 8.673	Hallandale Beach Boulevard Bridge over Atlantic Intracoastal Waterway	
Hallandale Beach / Hollywood	5.429	8.737	SR A1A (South Ocean Drive)	Eastern terminus
1.000 mi = 1.609 km; 1.000 km = 0.621 mi
