= Broward Boulevard =

Highway in Florida, United States

Broward Boulevard
- State Road 842 and County Road 842
- SR 842 in red, CR 842 in blue

Route information
- Maintained by FDOT and Broward Public Works
- Length: 11.766 mi (18.936 km) 7.166 mi (11.533 km) as SR 842

Major junctions
- West end: Commodore Drive in Plantation
- US 441 / SR 7 in Plantation; I-95 in Fort Lauderdale
- East end: US 1 in Fort Lauderdale

Location
- Country: United States
- State: Florida
- County: Broward

Highway system
- Florida State Highway System; Interstate; US; State; Former; Pre‑1945; Toll; Scenic
| ← SR 838 | → SR 843 |

Broward Boulevard is an 11.766-mile-long (18.936 km) major east–west thoroughfare through Broward County, Florida, mostly designated State Road 842 (SR 842). The western terminus is an intersection with Commodore Drive in Plantation, and it continues east to U.S. Route 1 (US 1) in Fort Lauderdale. The westernmost 5.4 miles (8.7 km) is designated as County Road 842 (CR 842), and is seldom signed as such.

Broward Boulevard serves as the main east–west access route to downtown Fort Lauderdale and is also the latitudinal baseline for the city's street grid. The street is named for Napoleon Bonaparte Broward, who is also the namesake of Broward County.

== Route description ==
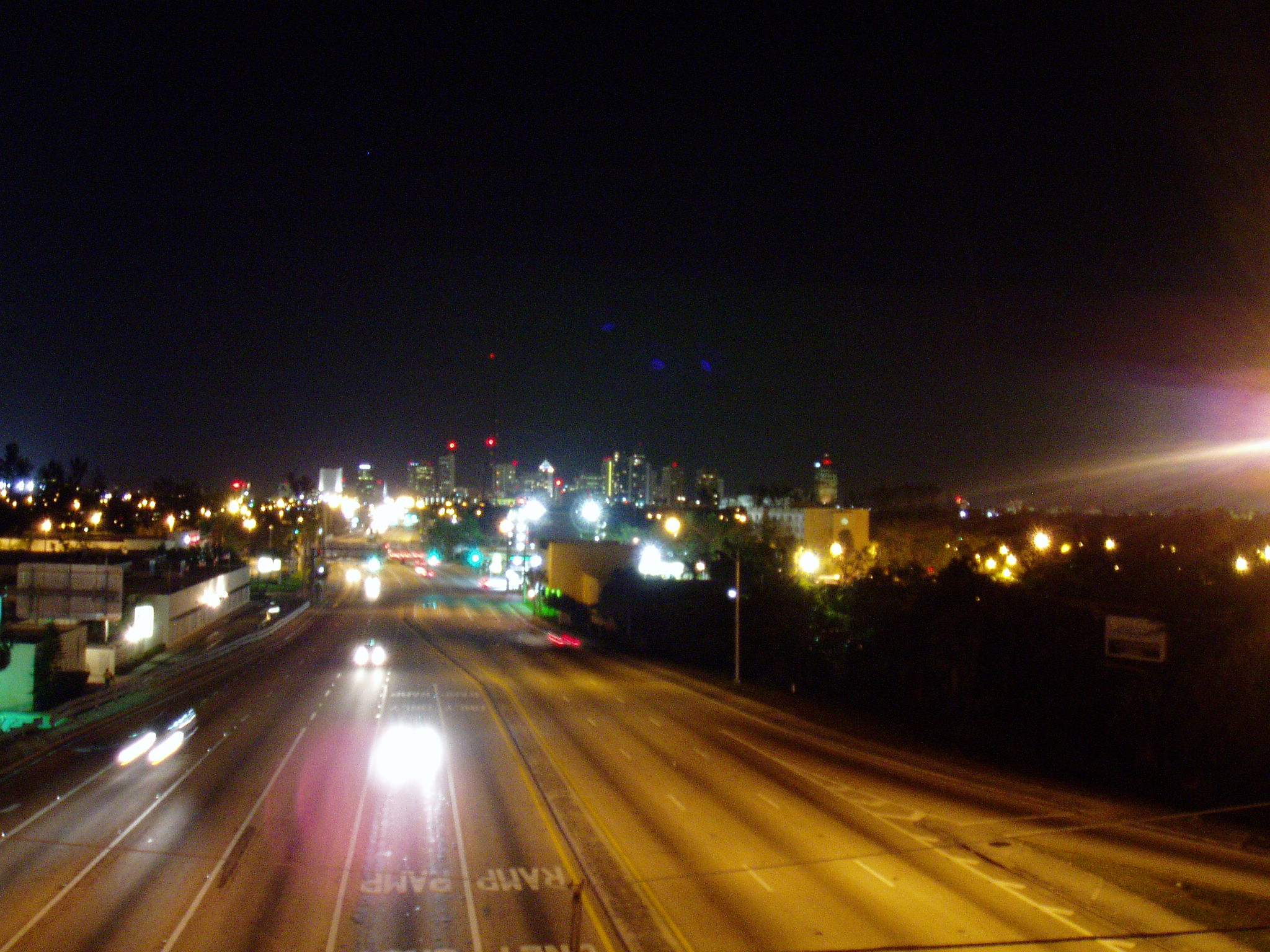
Downtown Fort Lauderdale looking over State Road 842 (Broward Boulevard)

Broward Boulevard begins as CR 842 at Commedore Drive in Plantation, a short connector road which connects to the westbound lanes of SR 84, which is the service road for Interstate 595 (I-595). At University Drive (SR 817) where Westfield Broward and Plantation Walk are located, SR 842 begins. This intersection also has one of the few CR 842 shields, visible to motorists traveling southbound on University Drive.

Just east of SR 817, Broward Boulevard passes by more commercial areas to the north, with Plantation Preserve Golf Course and Club to the south. East of NW 69th Avenue, the road becomes divided, and more residential as it enters Fort Lauderdale, passing under Florida's Turnpike without an interchange. East of the turnpike, it passes by the Fort Lauderdale Country Club to the south. As it approaches US 441, the road becomes more commercial again at the intersection and east of the intersection, continuing east. It continues through, with residential buildings about a block away from the commercial establishments, and crosses Interstate 95 and Tri-Rail and Amtrak Fort Lauderdale Station as SR 842 enters downtown Fort Lauderdale.

In the downtown area, government buildings and banks line State Road 842. At SW 7th Avenue, it provides access to the Broward Center for the Performing Arts and at SW 5th Avenue, provides access to the Museum of Discovery and Science. The Broward County Transit central bus terminal is on the corner of SR 842 and Northwest First Avenue. The intersection with Andrews Avenue (unsigned County Road 811A) is the center of Fort Lauderdale's street grid. One block east is Federal Highway (US 1/SR 5), the eastern terminus of SR 842, while Broward Boulevard continues eastward.

== History ==
Originally, State Road 842 was signed exclusively on Broward Boulevard. Starting in the mid-1980s, Las Olas Boulevard (SR A1A Alt.) was re-numbered and joined as part of State Road 842 from US 1 in downtown Fort Lauderdale to State Road A1A at the beach. Eventually the portion of Las Olas Boulevard between US 1 and Southeast 16th Avenue was transferred to the City of Fort Lauderdale, creating a gap in the route. In 2018, the Florida Department of Transportation released a new state highway system map, showing the rest of Las Olas Boulevard had been relinquished from the system, putting SR 842 exclusively on Broward Boulevard once again.

CR 842 was created at some point between September 2009 and May 2018, when it was decommissioned from its state road designation.

== Major intersections ==
The entire route is in Broward County.

| Location | mi | km | Destinations | Notes |
|---|---|---|---|---|
| Plantation | 0.0 | 0.0 | Commodore Drive | |
| Plantation | 0.7 | 1.1 | Flamingo Road (CR 823) | |
| Plantation | 4.6 0.000 | 7.4 0.000 | SR 817 (University Drive) to I-595 | Transition from CR 842 to SR 842 |
| Plantation | 3.140 | 5.053 | US 441 / SR 7 to I-595 / Florida's Turnpike | |
| Fort Lauderdale | 5.24 | 8.43 | I-95 / I-595 – West Palm Beach, Miami, Airport | Exit 27 on I-95 (unsigned SR 9; direct access to I-595 ramps |
| Fort Lauderdale | 7.166 | 11.533 | US 1 (Federal Highway) to I-595 – Airport | Road continues east without designation; US 1 is unsigned SR 5 |
1.000 mi = 1.609 km; 1.000 km = 0.621 mi: Route transition
