= Ives Estates, Florida =

- Census-designated place
- Location in Miami-Dade County and the state of Florida

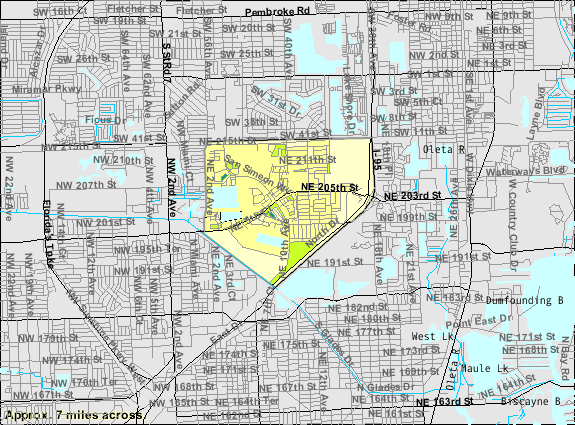
- U.S. Census Bureau map showing CDP boundaries
- Coordinates: 25°57′47″N 80°10′59″W
- Country: United States
- State: Florida
- County: Miami-Dade

Area
  - Total: 2.76 sq mi (7.15 km^{2})
  - Land: 2.55 sq mi (6.60 km^{2})
  - Water: 0.21 sq mi (0.55 km^{2})
- Elevation: 7 ft (2.1 m)

Population (2020)
  - Total: 25,005
  - Density: 9,812.7/sq mi (3,788.69/km^{2})
- Time zone: UTC-5 (Eastern (EST))
  - Summer (DST): UTC-4 (EDT)
- ZIP Code: 33179 (Miami)
- Area codes: 305, 786, 645
- FIPS code: 12-34400
- GNIS feature ID: 2402627

Ives Estates is a census-designated place (CDP) in Miami-Dade County, Florida. It is part of the Miami metropolitan area of South Florida. The population was 25,005 at the 2020 census, up from 19,525 in 2010.

== Geography ==
Ives Estates is located in northeastern Miami-Dade County and is bordered to the north by Broward County. Neighboring communities are Ojus to the east and southeast, North Miami Beach to the south and Miami Gardens to the west. To the north, in Broward County, are West Park and Pembroke Park, while Miramar is to the northwest and Hallandale Beach is to the northeast.

Interstate 95 forms the border between Ives Estates and Ojus, with access from Exit 16 (Ives Dairy Road). Downtown Miami is 16 miles (26 km) to the south, and Fort Lauderdale is 11 miles (18 km) to the north. County Road 854 (Ives Dairy Road/NE 203rd Street/NE 199th Street) is the main road through the center of Ives Estates, leading east to Aventura and west to Miami Gardens.

According to the United States Census Bureau, the CDP has a total area of 2.76 square miles (7.1 km^{2}), of which 2.55 square miles (6.6 km^{2}) are land and 0.21 square miles (0.54 km^{2}), or 7.71%, are water.

== Demographics ==
Historical population
Census	Pop.	Note	%±
1980	12,623		—
1990	13,531		7.2%
2000	17,586		30.0%
2010	19,525		11.0%
2020	25,005		28.1%
U.S. Decennial Census; 1990 2000

=== Racial and ethnic composition ===
Ives Estates CDP, Florida – Racial and ethnic composition Note: the US Census treats Hispanic/Latino as an ethnic category. This table excludes Latinos from the racial categories and assigns them to a separate category. Hispanics/Latinos may be of any race.
Race / Ethnicity (NH = Non-Hispanic)	Pop 2000	Pop 2010	Pop 2020	% 2000	% 2010	% 2020
White (NH)	5,863	3,639	3,602	33.34%	18.64%	14.41%
Black or African American (NH)	5,957	9,348	10,733	33.87%	47.88%	42.92%
Native American or Alaska Native (NH)	22	30	28	0.13%	0.15%	0.11%
Asian (NH)	794	569	627	4.51%	2.91%	2.51%
Pacific Islander or Native Hawaiian (NH)	9	6	12	0.05%	0.03%	0.05%
Other race (NH)	87	113	312	0.49%	0.58%	1.25%
Mixed race or Multiracial (NH)	620	418	905	3.53%	2.14%	3.62%
Hispanic or Latino (any race)	4,234	5,402	8,786	24.08%	27.67%	35.14%
Total	17,586	19,525	25,005	100.00%	100.00%	100.00%

=== 2020 census ===
As of the 2020 census, Ives Estates had a population of 25,005. The median age was 37.7 years. 21.4% of residents were under the age of 18 and 13.6% of residents were 65 years of age or older. For every 100 females there were 86.6 males, and for every 100 females age 18 and over there were 82.2 males age 18 and over.

100.0% of residents lived in urban areas, while 0.0% lived in rural areas.

There were 9,209 households in Ives Estates, of which 34.4% had children under the age of 18 living in them. Of all households, 38.3% were married-couple households, 17.8% were households with a male householder and no spouse or partner present, and 37.1% were households with a female householder and no spouse or partner present. About 24.1% of all households were made up of individuals and 9.0% had someone living alone who was 65 years of age or older. There were 5,516 families residing in the CDP.

There were 9,889 housing units, of which 6.9% were vacant. The homeowner vacancy rate was 1.6% and the rental vacancy rate was 7.9%.

Racial composition as of the 2020 census
Race	Number	Percent
White	5,866	23.5%
Black or African American	11,074	44.3%
American Indian and Alaska Native	81	0.3%
Asian	663	2.7%
Native Hawaiian and Other Pacific Islander	21	0.1%
Some other race	2,403	9.6%
Two or more races	4,897	19.6%
Hispanic or Latino (of any race)	8,786	35.1%

=== 2010 census ===
As of the 2010 United States census, there were 19,525 people, 6,710 households, and 4,054 families residing in the CDP.

=== 2000 census ===
As of the census of 2000, there were 17,586 people, 6,923 households, and 4,506 families residing in the CDP. The population density was 6,645.9 inhabitants per square mile (2,566.0/km^{2}). There were 7,449 housing units at an average density of 2,815.0 per square mile (1,086.9/km^{2}). The racial makeup of the CDP was 51.10% White (33.3% were Non-Hispanic White), 35.11% African American, 0.17% Native American, 4.63% Asian, 0.05% Pacific Islander, 3.76% from other races, and 5.17% from two or more races. Hispanic or Latino of any race were 24.08% of the population.

As of 2000, there were 6,923 households, out of which 32.7% had children under the age of 18 living with them, 40.8% were married couples living together, 19.2% had a female householder with no husband present, and 34.9% were non-families. 28.3% of all households were made up of individuals, and 9.1% had someone living alone who was 65 years of age or older. The average household size was 2.54 and the average family size was 3.13.

In 2000, in the CDP, the population was spread out, with 24.8% under the age of 18, 8.6% from 18 to 24, 33.6% from 25 to 44, 20.6% from 45 to 64, and 12.4% who were 65 years of age or older. The median age was 35 years. For every 100 females, there were 83.8 males. For every 100 females age 18 and over, there were 79.3 males.

In 2000, the median income for a household in the CDP was $40,717, and the median income for a family was $43,370. Males had a median income of $29,512 versus $27,544 for females. The per capita income for the CDP was $19,118. About 7.0% of families and 8.6% of the population were below the poverty line, including 8.4% of those under age 18 and 8.8% of those age 65 or over.

As of 2000, speakers of English as a first language accounted for 54.25% of residents, while Spanish made up 24.45%, French Creole was at 11.65%, French was at 2.35%, Urdu at 1.23%, Portuguese 1.11%, and Arabic was 1.08% of the population. Hebrew made up 0.73% of speakers, Russian made up 0.69%, and both Chinese and Tagalog was the mother tongue of 0.57% of the population.

== Education ==
- Miami-Dade County Public Schools operates public schools.
- Madie Ives K-8 Preparatory Academy
- Dr. Michael M. Krop High School
