= Florida State Road 823 =

State highway in Florida, United States

State Road 823 and County Road 823
- SR 823 in red, CR 823 in blue

Route information
- Maintained by FDOT and Broward Public Works
- Length: 20.596 mi (33.146 km) 3.7 mi (5.95 km) without state designation
- Existed: 1945 renumbering–present

Major junctions
- South end: US 27 in Hialeah
- SR 924 in Hialeah; SR 826 in Miami Lakes; Florida's Turnpike Extension in Miramar; I-595 / SR 84 in Davie
- North end: CR 816 in Sunrise

Location
- Country: United States
- State: Florida
- County: Broward

Highway system
- Florida State Highway System; Interstate; US; State; Former; Pre‑1945; Toll; Scenic
← SR 822	→ SR 824

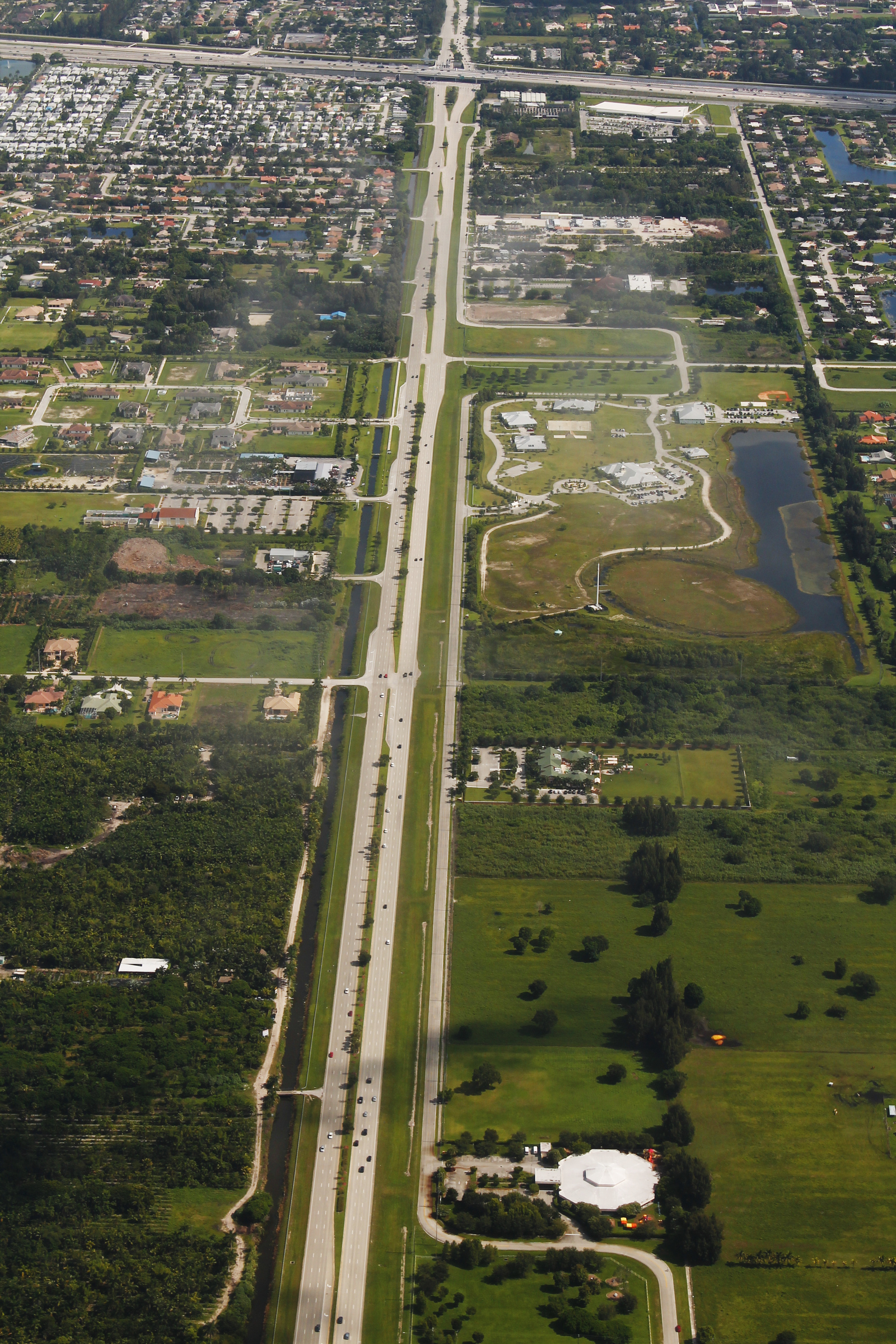
An aerial view of SR 823.

Florida State Road 823 (SR 823) is a 20.6-mile (33.2 km) long state highway in the U.S. state of Florida. The road runs from U.S. Route 27 (US 27 or SR 25) in Hialeah to Interstate 595 (I-595 or SR 862) and SR 84 in Davie. The section in Miami-Dade County, through Hialeah and Miami Lakes, is known as Red Road (also known as West Fourth Avenue in Hialeah's street grid and as West 57th Avenue in the countywide grid). In Broward County, the road turns northwest and merges into Flamingo Road, until its terminus in Davie, though the road continues without designation into Sunrise.

South of a gap due to Miami International Airport, Red Road is State Road 959.

== Route description ==
=== State Road 823 ===
State Road 823 begins at the northside of the Miami Canal at Okeechobee Road (US 27), being the northern segment of Red Road, running through the city of Hialeah as their West 4th Avenue, with intersections with State Road 934 and State Road 932. It has an interchange with State Road 924, and exits Hialeah at the intersection with State Road 916 (West 84th Street) and again becomes Northwest 57th Avenue at the southwest end of the Opa-locka Airport.

SR 823 continues north dividing the incorporated town of Miami Lakes to the west from Opa-locka Airport and the city of Miami Gardens to the east until it crosses the Palmetto Expressway (SR 826) where it continues to run north through unincorporated Miami-Dade County, with an intersection with State Road 860 in that stretch.

North of Honey Hill Drive, SR 823 becomes the dividing line between Miramar, Broward County and unincorporated Miami-Dade County, before fully entering Broward County and Miramar just south of the Homestead Extension of Florida's Turnpike (SR 821).

Curving northwest starting at the intersection with Miramar Parkway, SR 823 merges onto Flamingo Road, first intersecting State Road 820 by CB Smith Park and Pembroke Lakes Mall, followed by others at State Road 848, and State Road 818 before reaching its northern terminus with Interstate 595 (Unsigned SR 862) and State Road 84.

=== County Road 823 ===
Flamingo Road continues north beyond I-595 / SR 84 without state designation, providing access to Sawgrass Mills, one of the largest enclosed shopping centers in the United States, and the BB&T Center, home of the Florida Panthers National Hockey League team. This extension has the hidden designation of County Road 823. The northern terminus of Flamingo Road is at an intersection with Oakland Park Boulevard, itself an extension of SR 816, and the Sawgrass Expressway (SR 869), 3.69 miles (5.94 km) north of I-595.

== History ==
State Road 368 was defined by state law in 1937. This route ran along Red Road (present SR 823) from pre-1945 SR 26 (now US 27) in Hialeah north to Opa Locka Road (Northwest 138th Street, currently SR 916). There it turned west until County Road 80, where it turned back south to SR 26.

The other section of present SR 823 was defined in 1939 as State Road 517, running along Flamingo Road from Pembroke Road north to a branch of pre-1945 SR 26 (now SR 84).

In the 1945 renumbering, all but the southernmost mile of SR 517 became State Road 823 (giving it a southern terminus of SR 820). At some point, it was extended south to Snake Creek Canal and Northwest 202nd Street, just south of the Dade (now Miami-Dade) County boundary.

The other piece, partly former SR 368, was designated State Road 819 (SR 819) in the 1945 renumbering. This ran from SR 25 (now US 27) north to Golden Glades Drive (Northwest 167th Street, which later became part SR 826 before construction of the Palmetto Expressway), using former SR 368 south of Northwest 138th Street. The rest of SR 368 was not assigned a number, but part of it is now SR 916. This was extended north to SR 860 (Northwest 183rd Street) at some point; SR 819 was redesignated State Road 955 (SR 955) in 1983 as part of a statewide reorganization of State Roads.

Around 1992, the diagonal connection between Red Road and Flamingo Road was built, allowing SR 823 to extend south over that connection, first ending at SR 860, then taking over SR 955 in the mid 1990s. The former piece of SR 823 on Flamingo Road to the county line was kept as an unsigned State Road (to be designated State Road 9823).

=== "The Most Dangerous Intersection in America" ===
In 2001, State Farm Insurance ranked the intersection of Flamingo Road and Pines Boulevard in Pembroke Pines, "The Most Dangerous Intersection in America". Using data from over a two-year period, the company found that 357 vehicular accidents happened during their study at the intersection, which is where C. B. Smith Park, Pembroke Lakes Mall, a hospital, and two shopping centers are located. This prompted the city to make drastic changes to the intersection, which included lengthening the turning lanes and adding red light cameras. The number of accidents have since dropped significantly at the intersection.

=== State Road 9823 ===
In the early 1980s, there was apparently a reconfiguration of SR 823 in the Miami-Lakes area, but sources from FDOT to Miami-Dade County Planning to various commercial road maps disagree (in fact, contemporaneous documents from FDOT disagree on whether such a realignment actually happened). The majority of the sources contend that by 1983, SR 823 was rerouted along Northwest 68th Avenue and Miami Gardens Drive (SR 860) before returning to Ludlam Road.

After the shifting of SR 823 to Red Road, some sources indicated that FDOT was maintaining an "unsigned State Road 9823" that was part of an earlier configuration of SR 823 that had since been orphaned. One FDOT document indicated that SR 9823 was the stretch of Flamingo Road from the Red Road connector to a point under the Florida's Turnpike underpass; another FDOT document indicated it extended to the Miami-Dade/Broward County line or the original southern terminus near Snake Creek Canal. Yet other FDOT documents don't even indicate it ever existed.

Miami-Dade County planning maps do not show any indication of the existence of SR 9823, except for one that indicated the segment from the Palmetto Expressway to Broward County via Ludlam Road (with a "side trip" along Northwest 68th Avenue and SR 860) was SR 9823. This is also indicated by a handful of commercially prepared road maps (although a 2004 commercially prepared road map indicates SR 9823—as "County Road 9823"—is strictly Ludlam Road north of SR 826). Yet other sources do not indicate the existence of such a "hidden" State Road at all.

While there is a preponderance of evidence indicating SR 9823 having existed and taken the "Miami Lakes detour", this remains an open question.

== Major intersections ==
County	Location	mi	km	Destinations	Notes
Miami-Dade	Hialeah	0.000	0.000	US 27 (Okeechobee Road)	Southern terminus of SR 823
Miami-Dade	Hialeah	0.758	1.220	SR 934 (West 21st Street)	Northwest 74th Street
Miami-Dade	Hialeah	2.540	4.088	SR 932 (West 49th Street) to SR 826	Northwest 103rd Street
Miami-Dade	Hialeah	4.473– 4.645	7.199– 7.475	SR 924 to I-75 / SR 826	Tolled interchange with Gratigny Parkway
Miami-Dade	Hialeah–Miami Lakes line	4.754	7.651	SR 916 (Graham Dairy Road)	Northwest 138th Street
Miami-Dade	Miami Lakes	6.566– 6.611	10.567– 10.639	SR 826 to Florida's Turnpike – Airport	Interchange with Palmetto Expressway via Northwest 167th Street
Miami-Dade	Country Club	7.569	12.181	SR 860 (Miami Gardens Drive)	Northwest 183rd Street
Miami-Dade	Country Club	8.780	14.130	Honey Hill Drive	Northwest 202nd Street
Miami-Dade–Broward county line	Miramar	9.560– 9.894	15.385– 15.923	Florida's Turnpike Extension (SR 821) – Homestead, Orlando	Exit 43 on Turnpike Extension
Broward	Miramar	10.260	16.512	Miramar Parkway (CR 858)	Former SR 858
Broward	Miramar	11.697	18.824	Flamingo Road south	No northbound left turn; former SR 823 south
Broward	Miramar–Pembroke Pines line	12.206	19.644	Pembroke Road	To SR 824
Broward	Pembroke Pines	13.197	21.239	SR 820 (Pines Boulevard) to I-75	
Broward	Pembroke Pines	14.708	23.670	Sheridan Street (CR 822)	To SR 822
Broward	Cooper City	15.699	25.265	Stirling Road (CR 848)	To SR 848
Broward	Cooper City	17.045	27.431	SR 818 east (Griffin Road) to I-75	Western terminus of SR 818
Broward	Davie–Plantation line	20.596 0.0	33.146 0.0	I-595 / SR 84 to I-75 / Florida's Turnpike	Route transitions from SR 823 to CR 823; I-595 exit 2
Broward	Plantation	0.4	0.64	SR 842 (Broward Boulevard)	
Broward	Sunrise	2.1	3.4	Sunrise Boulevard (CR 838)	To SR 838
Broward	Sunrise	3.7	6.0	Oakland Park Boulevard (CR 816) to Sawgrass Expressway (SR 869) – Miami, West Palm Beach	Northern terminus of CR 823
1.000 mi = 1.609 km; 1.000 km = 0.621 mi: Electronic toll collection; Incomplete access; Route transition
