= Ronald Reagan Turnpike =

The Ronald Reagan Turnpike, often abbreviated RR TPK may refer to:

- Homestead Extension of Florida's Turnpike (unsigned Florida State Road 821), a toll road running from Florida City to Miramar.
- Florida's Turnpike mainline (unsigned Florida State Road 91), officially designated as the Ronald Reagan Turnpike along with the Homestead Extension, but this designation is rarely used.
