= Florida State Road 824 =

State highway in Florida, United States

State Road 824
- Pembroke Road
- SR 824 highlighted in red

Route information
- Maintained by FDOT
- Length: 6.547 mi (10.536 km)
- Existed: 1983 (as SR 824)–present

Major junctions
- West end: SR 817 in Miramar / Pembroke Pines
- US 441 in Miramar / Hollywood / West Park; I-95 in Pembroke Park / Hollywood / Hallandale Beach
- East end: US 1 in Hallandale Beach / Hollywood

Location
- Country: United States
- State: Florida
- Counties: Broward

Highway system
- Florida State Highway System; Interstate; US; State; Former; Pre‑1945; Toll; Scenic
← SR 823	→ SR 825

State Road 824 (SR 824), locally known as Pembroke Road, is a 6.547-mile-long (10.536 km) east–west highway and major commuter route in southern Broward County, Florida. Its western terminus is an intersection with South University Drive (SR 817), on the boundary between Miramar and Pembroke Pines and adjacent to North Perry Airport; its eastern terminus is an intersection with South Federal Highway (US 1/SR 5) on the boundary between Hollywood and Hallandale Beach at the northeastern end of the Hollywood Dog Track.

== Route description ==
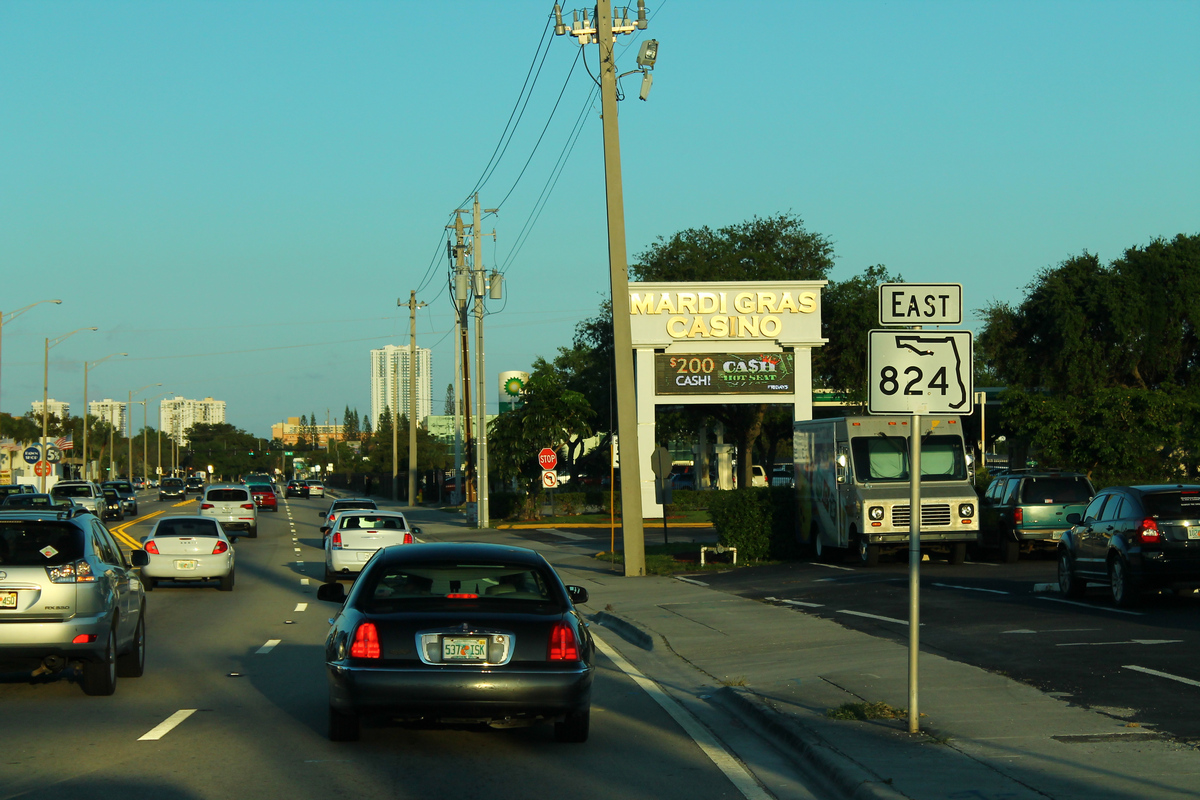
SR 824 east.

State Road 824 begins at the eastern end of the intersection between University Drive (SR 817) and Pembroke Road at the boundary between Pembroke Pines and Miramar on the southwest end of North Perry Airport. SR 824 takes Pembroke Road east, with the airport on the north side of the road and residential development on the south. Just past the eastern end of the airport, SR 824 crosses under Florida's Turnpike without an interchange, leaves Pembroke Pines and represents Hollywood's southern border for the rest of its route, continuing to act as Miramar's northern boundary for the next mile. East of the overpass, the road's surroundings turns into a mix of commercial and residential developments. At US 441/SR 7, the road borders Miramar to the southwest, West Park to the southeast, and Hollywood to the north, as it begins to border West Park heading eastwards. The road passes by a commercial complex on both sides of the road before becoming a primarily residential road, with SR 824 forming the southern boundary of the Hillcrest Country Club from 46th Avenue. At 40th Avenue, the road leaves West Park and begins to border Pembroke Park to the south, becoming commercial again with several storage centers to the south of the road as it heads towards an interchange with Interstate 95. Following the interchange with I-95, it borders Hallandale Beach to the south, becoming a mostly residential road between I-95 and the Dixie Highway. Between the Dixie Highway and the eastern terminus of SR 824 at the Federal Highway (US 1/SR 5), the road forms the northern boundary of the Hollywood Dog Track.

Pembroke Road extends 5.5 miles (8.9 km) past the western terminus of SR 824, primarily as a residential road but also going by the South Florida State Hospital, and the Market Place Mall at an intersection with SR 823, and crosses over Interstate 75 without an interchange, and then ends at Southwest 196th Avenue. A shorter section further west connects US 27/SR 25 to Southwest 208th Avenue. There is a project planned by the cities of Pembroke Pines, Miramar and the Mobility Advancement Program (MAP Broward) to connect the two segments.

East of SR 824's terminus with US 1, the road continues into a residential area for a few blocks to Southwest 14th Avenue, and is named Moffett Street for its duration.

== History ==
The SR 824 designation was originally applied to Hallandale Beach Boulevard (current SR 858), 1.2-mile (1.9 km) to the south; at the same time, a stretch of Pembroke Road between US 441 (SR 7) and then-SR 5A (Dixie Highway) had State Road 824A signage. About 1983, both streets received their present State Road designations (with the "new" SR 824 having more than double the length of the former SR 824A). The number reassignments occurred at roughly the same time that many Dade County State Roads were given new numbers in a reorganization by the Florida Department of Transportation.

== Major intersections ==
The entire route is in Broward County.

Location	mi	km	Destinations	Notes
Miramar–Pembroke Pines line	0.000	0.000	SR 817 (University Drive) to I-595 / Florida's Turnpike Extension	west end of state maintenance
Miramar–Hollywood– West Park tripoint	2.528	4.068	US 441 (SR 7) to I-595	
Pembroke Park–Hollywood– Hallandale Beach tripoint	5.08	8.18	I-95 (SR 9) – West Palm Beach, Miami	Exit 19 on I-95
Hallandale Beach–Hollywood line	6.157	9.909	Dixie Highway (CR 5A south)	
Hallandale Beach–Hollywood line	6.547	10.536	US 1 (Federal Highway / SR 5)	Eastern terminus
1.000 mi = 1.609 km; 1.000 km = 0.621 mi
