= County Road 854 (Miami-Dade County, Florida) =

Former state highway in Florida, United States

County Road 854

Route information
- Length: 9.50 mi (15.29 km)
- Existed: 1983 (as SR 854); 2004 (as CR 854)–present

Major junctions
- West end: SR 823 in Royal Country
- SR 817 in Miami Gardens; I-95 in Ives Estates and Ojus
- East end: US 1 in Aventura

Location
- Country: United States
- State: Florida
- County: Miami-Dade

Highway system
- County roads in Florida; County roads in Miami-Dade County

County Road 854 (CR 854), locally known as Ives Dairy Road, Dan Marino Boulevard, and Honey Hill Drive, is the unsigned designation for an east–west commuter road spanning 8.7 miles (14.0 km) across northern Miami-Dade County, which encompasses sections of North 199th Street, North 202nd Street, North 203rd Street, and North 205th Terrace. Its western terminus is an intersection with Red Road/Northwest 57th Avenue (State Road 823, SR 823) near Miami Lakes and Carol City, the eastern terminus is an intersection with Biscayne Boulevard (US Highway 1, US 1) in Aventura, a half block east of an overpass over West Dixie Highway that once served as part of the Dixie Highway and US 1.

== Route description ==
For most of the route, County Road 854 is within two miles south of Miami-Dade County’s boundary with Broward County and adjacent to Snake Creek Canal. A reversible lane setup is in place between SR 817 and US 441, serving Hard Rock Stadium.

The 1.0-mile-long stretch alongside Hard Rock Stadium notwithstanding, CR 854 snakes through suburban residential developments with the occasional shopping center along the way. The former State Road is often used as an alternative to the Homestead Extension of Florida's Turnpike (SR 821) and the Palmetto Expressway (SR 826), when traffic is heavy or blocked on the expressways.

Beyond the western terminus of CR 854, Northwest 202nd Street travels west as a divided road, intersecting with Flamingo Road. To the west, the road extends an additional 1.5 miles (2.4 km) to its end in a residential division next to the Homestead Extension of Florida’s Turnpike.

== History ==
From the late 1950s until 1980, the southern terminus of SR 823 was an intersection of Ludlam Road/Flamingo Road (West 67th Avenue) and North 202nd Street.

Originally, North 199th Street was designated State Road 852 from Red Road (now SR 823) to US 1. In a statewide reallocation of numbers in 1983, the SR 852 signs were moved one mile (1.6 km) northward to County Line Road, and the former SR 852 was relabeled State Road 854, a designation that the route had for two decades. Some commercially available maps still show the road as a State Road despite its reversion to Miami-Dade County maintenance.

== Major intersections ==
The entire route is in Miami-Dade County.

Location	mi	km	Destinations	Notes
Country Club–Miramar– Royal Country tripoint	0.000	0.000	SR 823 (Northwest 57th Avenue / Red Road) to Florida's Turnpike Extension	Western terminus
Miami Gardens	1.1	1.8	SR 847 (Northwest 47th Avenue)	
Miami Gardens	3.113	5.010	SR 817 (Northwest 27th Avenue / Unity Boulevard) to Florida's Turnpike Extension – Race Track	
Miami Gardens	4.202	6.762	Florida's Turnpike (SR 91) to I-95 / SR 826 – Orlando, Homestead, Miami	Exit 2X on Turnpike
Miami Gardens	5.660	9.109	US 441 (Northwest 2nd Avenue / SR 7) to I-95 south / SR 826	
Ives Estates–Ojus line	8.3	13.4	I-95 (SR 9) – West Palm Beach, Miami	Exit 16 on I-95
Ojus	9.447	15.203	West Dixie Highway	Eastbound access is via Northeast 26th Avenue
Aventura	9.50	15.29	US 1 (Biscayne Boulevard / SR 5) / Northeast 203rd Street east	interchange
1.000 mi = 1.609 km; 1.000 km = 0.621 mi
