= Pembroke, Florida =

Pembroke, Florida may refer to:

- Pembroke Park, Florida, originally named Pembroke, Broward County
- Pembroke Pines, Florida, Broward County
- Pembroke, Polk County, Florida, a ghost town in Florida
