= Graham W. King =

Floridian politician

Graham W. King was a state legislator in Florida. He lived in Ojus and represented Dade County in the Florida House of Representatives. He served two terms in 1903 and 1905 as a Democrat.
