= Florida State Road 847 =

State highway in Florida, United States

State Road 847
- Northwest 47th Avenue

Route information
- Maintained by FDOT
- Length: 2.144 mi (3.450 km)

Major junctions
- South end: SR 860 in Miami Gardens
- North end: Broward County line

Location
- Country: United States
- State: Florida
- Counties: Miami-Dade

Highway system
- Florida State Highway System; Interstate; US; State; Former; Pre‑1945; Toll; Scenic
| ← SR 845 | → SR 848 |

State Road 847 (SR 847) is a 2.14-mile (3.44 km) state highway along Northwest 47th Avenue in northern Miami-Dade County, Florida, serving the Carol City/Miami Gardens area. It runs from SR 860 (Miami Gardens Drive) north to the Broward County line at Northwest 215th Street, just south of a bridge carrying the Homestead Extension of Florida's Turnpike (SR 821). There is no signage indicating either terminus of SR 847.

== Route description ==
State Road 847 begins at an intersection with State Road 860 and NW 47th Avenue, with SR 847 proceeding north through a dense residential area until an intersection with NW 199th Avenue/Honey Hill Drive. At the northwest corner of this intersection is the Landmark Center (formerly Sunland Training Center), a facility for the education of individuals with developmental and learning disabilities. A commercial development straddles the northeastern end of the intersection, with SR 847 continuing through more spread out residential areas until it crosses a canal, where it parallels a canal for the remainder of its route through undeveloped area to the east and a landfill to the west. at NW 215th Street, just south of the Broward County line.

In Broward County, the road continues with the hidden designation, north as Palm Avenue/SW 101st Avenue through and beyond Miramar, which ends north of State Road 869 (the Sawgrass Expressway) after changing names several times to Coral Ridge Drive and Nob Hill Road.

Northwest 47th Avenue continues south from SR 860 as a locally maintained road, crossing State Road 826 (the Palmetto Expressway), passing Florida Memorial University and ending north of the Opa-locka Airport.

== History ==
Palm Avenue/SW 101st Avenue in Miramar was once part of SR 847, ending at the border with Pembroke Pines.

== Major intersections ==
| County | Location | mi | km | Destinations | Notes |
|---|---|---|---|---|---|
| Miami-Dade | Miami Gardens | 0.000 | 0.000 | SR 860 (Northwest 183rd Street / Miami Gardens Drive) | Southern terminus |
| Miami-Dade | Miami Gardens | 0.992 | 1.596 | Northwest 199th Street / Honey Hill Drive (CR 854) - Stadium | |
| Miami-Dade–Broward county line | Miami Gardens–Miramar line | 2.144 | 3.450 | Northwest 215th Street / SW 101st Avenue | |
1.000 mi = 1.609 km; 1.000 km = 0.621 mi
