= Florida State Road 817 =

State highway in Florida, United States

State Road 817

Route information
- Maintained by FDOT
- Length: 25.691 mi (41.346 km)

Major junctions
- South end: SR 9 in Opa-locka
- SR 826 in Miami Gardens; Florida's Turnpike Extension in Miramar; I-595 / SR 84 in Davie
- North end: SR 827 in Parkland

Location
- Country: United States
- State: Florida
- Counties: Miami-Dade, Broward

Highway system
- Florida State Highway System; Interstate; US; State; Former; Pre‑1945; Toll; Scenic
← SR 816	→ SR 818

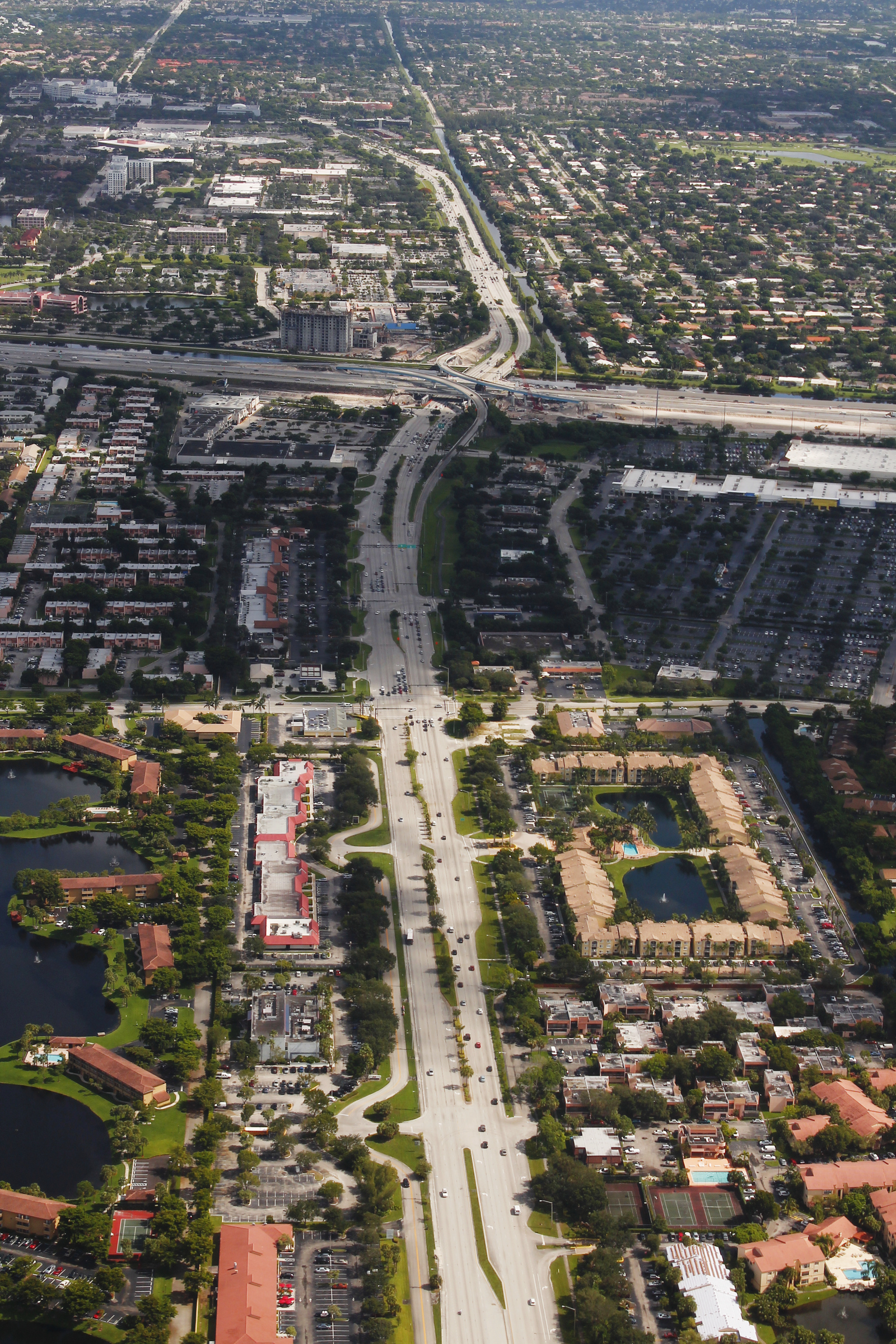
An aerial view of FL 817.

Florida State Road 817 (SR 817) is a 25.691-mile-long (41.346 km) state highway in the U.S. state of Florida, locally known as Northwest 27th Avenue (Unity Boulevard / Carrie P. Meek Boulevard) in Miami-Dade County and University Drive in Broward County. Its southern terminus is an intersection in Opa-locka with SR 9, which continues south along Northwest 27th Avenue to Dixie Highway (U.S. Route 1 (US 1) / SR 5) in the Coconut Grove neighborhood of Miami. Its northern terminus is at State Road 834 in Coral Springs, though the right of way continues north to Loxahatchee Road (County Road 827 or CR 827) at the Palm Beach County line.

== Route description ==
SR 817 begins when Northwest 27th Avenue splits from its concurrency with State Road 9 in Opa-locka, and heads north, while SR 9 heads northeast towards the Golden Glades Interchange. The road passes through several neighborhoods, and has with two major intersections with the Palmetto Expressway and Miami Gardens Drive in Opa-locka and Miami Gardens, respectively. North of Miami Gardens Drive, SR 817 heads into one of the most congested zones in Miami Gardens, which includes access to Hard Rock Stadium, Calder Casino and Race Course, and an interchange with State Road 852 and the Turnpike that straddles the county line between Miami-Dade and Broward.

SR 817 enters Broward County and becomes University Drive after its intersection with SR 852. The road has no major intersections in Miramar. After its intersection with Pembroke Road on the border between Miramar and Pembroke Pines, University Drive forms the western border of North Perry Airport until its intersection with Pines Boulevard. After its intersection with Sheridan Street, SR 817 passes through what was formerly the Waldrep Dairy Farm until its intersection with Stirling Road. The road is sparsely littered with commercial businesses between its intersection with Stirling and Griffin Roads. North of Griffin, the road passes by Nova Southeastern University and the Central Campus of Broward College on its east side before its major intersections with State Road 84 and Interstate 595 (I-595) as it heads into Plantation.

North of I-595, SR 817 intersects with Broward Boulevard. Westfield Broward and Plantation Walk are located at this intersection. Afterwards, the road passes through mostly residential developments (which includes intersections with Sunrise Boulevard and Oakland Park Boulevard) in the cities of Sunrise and Lauderhill until its intersection with Commercial Boulevard. North of Commercial, the road continues about another three miles through Tamarac before its next major intersection with Atlantic Boulevard in Coral Springs. Coral Square is located at this intersection.

North of Atlantic Boulevard marks SR 817's final stretch into Coral Springs, with the final intersection at State Road 834 (Sample Road). University Drive continues north through an interchange with State Road 869 (Sawgrass Expressway) and a residential development in Parkland to terminate at an intersection with Loxahatchee Road on the Palm Beach County line.

== Future ==
According to maps published by Fort Lauderdale-based Dolph Map Company, an extension of University Drive into Palm Beach County has been proposed. Under the proposal, the north–south highway will continue north past its terminus at Loxahatchee Road and connect to an intersection with Glades Road (a western extension of SR 808) and Palmetto Park Road (formerly SR 798). No indication has been given of what number designation this extension would have, or whether it would be a state or county road. However, the residents of western Boca Raton and Parkland have been fighting this extension for years, so it is unlikely.

== Major intersections ==
County	Location	mi	km	Destinations	Notes
Miami-Dade	Opa-locka	0.000	0.000	SR 9 south (Unity Boulevard)	Southern terminus; no access to SR 9 north
Miami-Dade	Miami Gardens	1.74	2.80	SR 826 – Airport	Interchange; access via Northwest 167th Street
Miami-Dade	Miami Gardens	2.740	4.410	SR 860 (Miami Gardens Drive)	Northwest 183rd Street
Miami-Dade	Miami Gardens	3.741	6.021	Honey Hill Drive (CR 854)	Northwest 199th Street
Miami-Dade–Broward county line	Miami Gardens–Miramar line	4.866	7.831	SR 852 east (County Line Road) to Florida's Turnpike north / US 441 – Orlando	Northwest 215th Street
Broward	Miramar	4.91	7.90	Florida's Turnpike Extension south – Homestead	Exit 47 on Turnpike Extension
Broward	Miramar	5.537	8.911	Miramar Parkway (CR 858) to I-75 / I-95 / SR A1A	
Broward	Miramar–Pembroke Pines line	6.451	10.382	SR 824 east (Pembroke Road) to I-95	Western terminus of SR 824
Broward	Pembroke Pines	7.449	11.988	SR 820 (Pines Boulevard) to I-75 / I-95 / Florida's Turnpike	
Broward	Pembroke Pines–Hollywood– Davie–Cooper City quadripoint	8.966	14.429	CR 822 (Sheridan Street) to I-75 / I-95	Former SR 822
Broward	Davie–Cooper City line	9.979	16.060	SR 848 east / CR 848 west (Stirling Road) to I-95	Western terminus of SR 848; eastern terminus of CR 848
Broward	Davie	11.303	18.190	SR 818 (Griffin Road) to I-75 / I-95 / Florida's Turnpike – Davie Arena	
Broward	Davie–Plantation line	13.627– 13.724	21.931– 22.087	I-595 / SR 84 to I-75 / I-95 / Florida's Turnpike – Fort Lauderdale, Airport	Exit 6 on I-595
Broward	Plantation	14.144	22.763	Peters Road east	Former SR 736
Broward	Plantation	15.220	24.494	SR 842 east to CR 842 (Broward Boulevard) / I-95	Western terminus of SR 842; eastern terminus of CR 842
Broward	Plantation	17.208	27.694	SR 838 east to CR 838 / I-95 / Florida's Turnpike / SR 869 (Sawgrass Expressway)	Western terminus of SR 838; eastern terminus of CR 838
Broward	Sunrise	18.477	29.736	SR 816 east / CR 816 west (Oakland Park Boulevard) to SR 869 (Sawgrass Expressway)	Western terminus of SR 816; eastern terminus of CR 816
Broward	Lauderhill–Tamarac line	20.408	32.843	SR 870 east / CR 870 west (Commercial Boulevard) to I-95 / Florida's Turnpike / SR 869 (Sawgrass Expressway)	Western terminus of SR 870; eastern terminus of CR 870
Broward	Coral Springs	23.632	38.032	CR 814 (Atlantic Boulevard) to Florida's Turnpike / SR 869 (Sawgrass Expressway)	
Broward	Coral Springs	25.869	41.632	SR 834 east / CR 834 west (Sample Road) to Florida's Turnpike / SR 869 (Sawgrass Expressway)	University Drive continues north without designation
1.000 mi = 1.609 km; 1.000 km = 0.621 mi: Incomplete access
