= Waldrep Dairy Farm =

Last functional dairy farm in Broward County, Florida

Coordinates: 26°02′10″N 80°14′56″W

Waldrep Dairy Farm, 1928, near present-day Taft Street & University Drive

The Waldrep Dairy Farm, established in 1928, was the last functional dairy farm in Broward County and Miami-Dade County within the state of Florida until its closure in 2005. With much of the South Florida region finding its roots as farm, it served as a landmark and reminder of Broward County's past. At its peak, the farm's reach included many sections of what is now the City of Cooper City, eastern sections of the City of Pembroke Pines, western sections of the City of Hollywood and some areas of the Town of Davie. By the mid 1990s, it has been reduced to less than 1,000 acres (4.0 km^{2}).

Owned by Wiley Waldrep until his death in 1997, the farm was passed on to his grandchildren. Appeals by them to try to maintain the family business ran into difficulty, with costs eventually preventing the farm from even breaking even.

== Monterra ==
As a result, on August 5, 2003 the 530-acre (2.1 km^{2}) farm was sold to TOUSA Homes. Court appeals filed by Broward County prevented immediate development of the site. The case was decided in November 2004 in favor of the developer. It was estimated that approximately 1,900 homes would be built on the land when construction began in 2006.

Originally part of unincorporated Broward County, the site was annexed by the City of Cooper City in 2004. The development of the land remains a sour point of discussion amongst many longtime residents of the area.

The Monterra development is divided up into many smaller developments, including Estada at Monterra and Cascada at Monterra. Originally to be built exclusively by Tousa, the development was sold after it went into bankruptcy. Construction stopped sometime in mid 2008. Carr Residential was then the owner and the new Cascada element of the development was being built by Minto Group, while the Estada sub-development was being built by Lennar. Construction restarted in January 2010.

== Legacy ==
On March 19, 2002, an extension of Pine Island Road between Sheridan Street (County Road 822) and Stirling Road (County Road 848) was named Waldrep Dairy Road. This extension goes through what was once part of the farm.
