= Okeelanta, Florida =

- Unincorporated community
- Location within the state of Florida
- Coordinates: 26°36.6′N 80°42.6′W
- Country: United States
- State: Florida
- County: Palm Beach
- Elevation: 9.8 ft (3.0 m)
- Time zone: UTC-5 (Eastern (EST))
  - Summer (DST): UTC-4 (EDT)
- Area code: 561
- GNIS feature ID: 294872

Okeelanta is an unincorporated community in Palm Beach County, Florida, United States, located approximately 4 miles (7 km) south of South Bay on U.S. Route 27 at County Road 827. It was originally developed as a planned community in the 1910s, but had effectively disappeared by the end of the 1920s. The name is a portmanteau of Lake Okeechobee and Atlantic Ocean.

== History ==
In early 1913, Thomas E. Will, a former college professor, college president, and secretary of the American Forestry Association, purchased almost 900 acres of land south of South Bay and adjacent to 120 acres of land he had previously purchased. Later that year, Will launched the planned community of Okeelanta on what is now where the Bolles Canal meets the North New River Canal, laying out small plots to sell to settlers. His son Lawrence was one of the first five settlers.

Although the settlers had difficulty farming the soil muck, they eventually managed by varying their crops of beans, potatoes, cabbage, and lettuce. Will himself joined the group of settlers in late 1914. Supplies were shipped to the community by boat up the New River from Fort Lauderdale, almost sixty miles away. In early 1915, a store was built after Will offered the store owner a lot free of charge. New settlers arrived during 1915. In 1916, the Palm Beach County School Board built a one-room schoolhouse on a lot donated by Will.

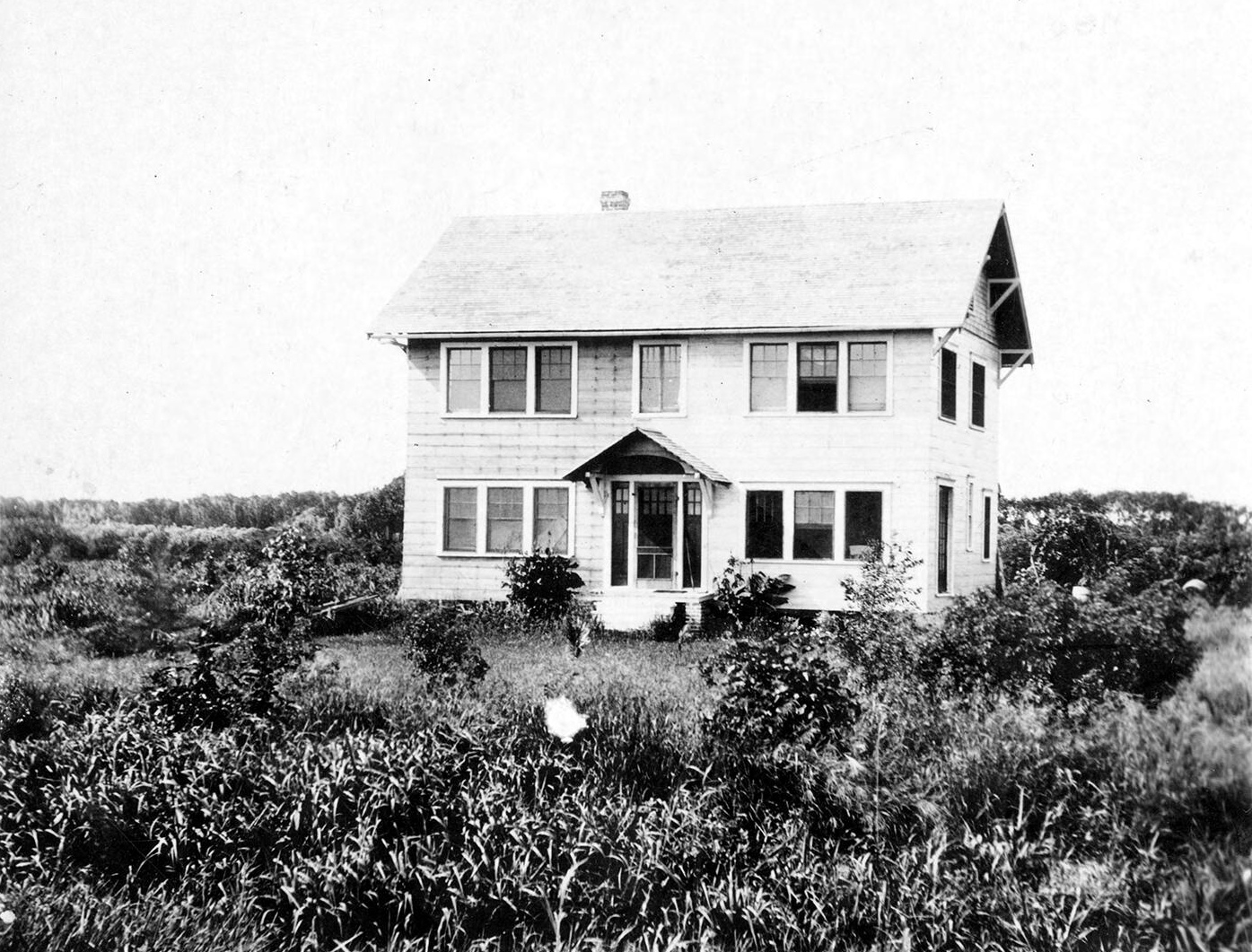
House of Thomas E. Will, founder of Okeelanta, Florida, on North New River Canal, Okeelanta, Sept. 1916

By 1917, there were 110 families in the town, plus a hotel, town hall, lumberyard, blacksmith, and barber. Will and other residents organized for the construction of a road from West Palm Beach to Fort Myers through Okeelanta. Although the road was built, it bypassed Okeelanta and ran along the south shore of Lake Okeechobee four miles north. Nevertheless, a dirt road was constructed along the spoil bank of the Bolles Canal connecting Okeelanta with the cross-state highway at Six Mile Bridge, just southeast of Belle Glade.

By 1920, the town population had grown to 200 residents, despite problems with the soil, floods, freezes, and mosquitoes. However, that year saw a particularly devastating flood, which caused a suspension of agricultural operations. Will left Okeelanta for Fort Lauderdale on what he believed would be a temporary basis. The early 1920s saw the water table alternately sink to levels ideal for farming, but too low for shipping, or to levels too high for farming yet ideal for shipping. By 1925, a visitor reported Okeelanta to be almost deserted, with the north side of the Bolles Canal reverting to sawgrass and boggy ground in front of the old hotel. The disastrous 1928 Okeechobee hurricane put a final end to Okeelanta.

After the east–west road from West Palm Beach bypassed Okeelanta, Will began a campaign to have the state build a "Lauderdale to Lake" road alongside the North New River Canal. After the development of sugar interests in the area, Will expanded his efforts to have the state build a road from Miami to South Bay. In 1935, the Florida State Road Department allotted $450,000 ($10.6 million in 2025 dollars) for the construction of the road. In 1937, the Florida Legislature adopted a resolution naming the road the Thomas E. Will Memorial Highway, which was opened to traffic in 1941. Now U.S. 27, the road passes through Okeelanta, of which nothing remains save for the now-paved Bolles Canal Road, signed as County Road 827.

== See also ==
- List of geographic names derived from portmanteaus
