= Florida State Road 827 =

Former highway in Florida

State Road 827

Route information
- Maintained by FDOT
- Length: 20.9 mi (33.6 km)
- Existed: 1945–1990

Major junctions
- West end: US 27 in Okeelanta
- East end: US 441 / SR 7 in Parkland

Location
- Country: United States
- State: Florida
- Counties: Palm Beach, Broward

Highway system
- Florida State Highway System; Interstate; US; State; Former; Pre‑1945; Toll; Scenic
← SR 826	→ SR 833

The former State Road 827, was an east–west road that stretched 35 miles (56 km) along the southern edge of the Hillsboro Canal, originally extending from Sixmile Bend to present-day Parkland. Now County Road 827, the road is locally known as Browns Farms Road and Loxahatchee Road in two segments, while a third is unnamed.

When the route was established in 1945, it extended from its western terminus, being what is now U.S. Route 27 to its eastern terminus being an intersection with U.S. Route 441 and State Road 7) in Broward County.

== Route description ==
The former SR 827 crossed a vast stretch of the Everglades wetlands along the opposite side of the Hillsboro Canal from the Arthur R. Marshall Loxahatchee National Wildlife Refuge and through a region managed by the South Florida Water Management District and the U.S. Army Corps of Engineers.

== History ==
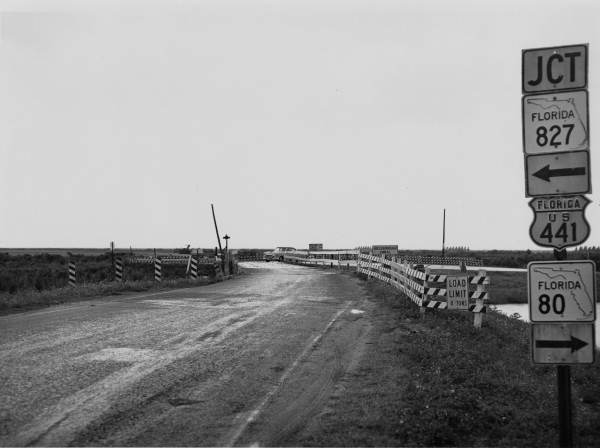
Northern terminus in 1953 at SR 80 (current CR 880)

The road was established in 1945. It extended from the intersection between it and then-US 441-SR 80, which was re designated as State Road 880 after US 441/SR 80 was rerouted several miles north.

After the establishment of the Everglades Wildlife Management Area by the Florida Fish and Wildlife Conservation Commission in the 1960s, the portion of SR 827 within its boundaries was removed from the state highway system, creating a gap in the route. Shortly afterward, a second section east of Browns Farm was reverted to Palm Beach County control (many commercially prepared maps from the 1970s to the present show this second section as part of County Road 827). For at least two decades, SR 827 was an "interrupted" State Road.

By 1990, the Broward County segment was transitioned from State to County control and became CR 827. The northwestern section followed suit within a few years and also became CR 827. Currently, only the part of the original SR 827 northwest of Browns Farm is currently signed as CR 827. The Broward County segment has since been relinquished from county control to the city of Parkland and is no longer signed CR 827.

== Major intersections ==
County	Location	mi	km	Destinations	Notes
Palm Beach	Okeelanta	0.0	0.0	US 27	
Palm Beach		2.5	4.0	CR 827A north	Southern terminus of CR 827A
Palm Beach	Gap in route				
Palm Beach	Sixmile Bend	0.0	0.0	CR 880	
Palm Beach		14.7	23.7	Loxahatchee National Wildlife Refuge	East end of Browns Farms Road
Gap in route
Broward		0.0	0.0	Loxahatchee National Wildlife Refuge	West end of Loxahatchee Road
Broward		3.0	4.8	University Drive south	To SR 817
Broward	Parkland	6.2	10.0	US 441 / SR 7	
1.000 mi = 1.609 km; 1.000 km = 0.621 mi
