= Six Flags Atlantis =

Six Flags water park in Hollywood, Florida

- Interactive map of Six Flags Atlantis
- Location: Hollywood, Florida, U.S.
- Coordinates: 26°2′51″N 80°9′33″W
- Status: Defunct
- Opened: 1983
- Closed: 1992

Six Flags Atlantis (later operated as Atlantis the Water Kingdom) was a water park in Hollywood, Florida, that occupied 65 acres on the southeastern intersection of Stirling Road (State Road 848) and I-95.

The $12-million park included a wave pool, a lake with water ski shows, a seven-story slide tower, picnic area, stores and arcades, shows, and activities for all ages.

== History ==
Begun as a private venture originally known as "Atlantis the Water Kingdom", funding ran out before construction was completed. The park sat partially completed for several months before Six Flags opened "Six Flags Atlantis" in 1983.

In 1989, the park was sold. The new owners revived the original name, "Atlantis the Water Kingdom", and successfully reconfigured Atlantis as a smaller, more efficient park. Following damage during Hurricane Andrew in 1992, the park closed and the assets were auctioned off.

== Today ==
Today most of the area is now occupied by retail shopping (Oakwood Plaza).

== See also ==
- List of water parks

== Other resources ==
The Unofficial Atlantis Memorial has more history, some photos, and memorabilia.
