= Golden Glades station =

Tri-Rail commuter rail station

Golden Glades

General information
- Location: 16000 North State Road 9 Miami, Florida
- Coordinates: 25.921529°N 80.216949°W
- Line: South Florida Rail Corridor
- Platforms: 1 side platform, 1 island platform
- Tracks: 3
- Connections: Greyhound; Metrobus: 75, 77, 95, 401, NMB Line Route E Broward County Transit: 18, 102, 441

Construction
- Accessible: Yes

Other information
- Fare zone: Miami–Golden Glades (Tri-Rail)

History
- Opened: January 9, 1989

Services
Preceding station	Tri-Rail	Following station
Opa-locka toward Miami Airport	Main Line	Hollywood toward Mangonia Park
Express does not stop here
Location

Golden Glades is a Tri-Rail commuter rail station in Miami-Dade County, Florida, just west of the namesake Golden Glades Interchange. This station is located at the confluence of U.S. Route 441 and State Road 9. It opened to service January 9, 1989, and is the northernmost Tri-Rail station in Miami-Dade County. Golden Glades provides intercity bus service via Greyhound Lines at the station.

== Layout ==
The station has an island platform and side platform, both of which are only accessible via an elevated walkway over State Route 9 to reach parking and buses.
