= Ojus, Florida =

- Census-designated place
- Location in Miami-Dade County and the state of Florida

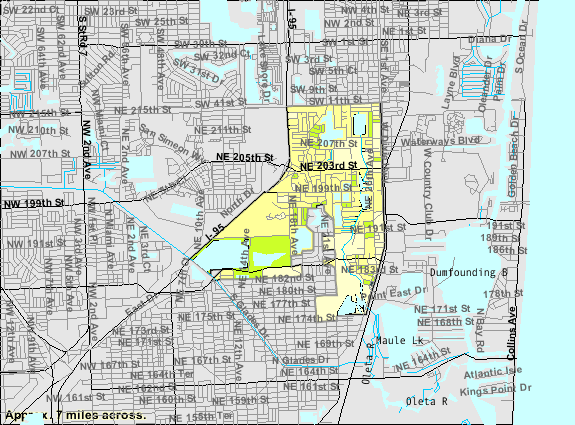
- U.S. Census Bureau map showing CDP boundaries
- Coordinates: 25°57′12″N 80°09′58″W
- Country: United States
- State: Florida
- County: Miami-Dade

Area
  - Total: 3.16 sq mi (8.18 km^{2})
  - Land: 2.65 sq mi (6.86 km^{2})
  - Water: 0.51 sq mi (1.32 km^{2})
- Elevation: 7 ft (2.1 m)

Population (2020)
  - Total: 19,673
  - Density: 7,426.7/sq mi (2,867.48/km^{2})
- Time zone: UTC-5 (Eastern (EST))
  - Summer (DST): UTC-4 (EDT)
- ZIP codes: 33163 (Ojus); 33160 (North Miami Beach); 33179 (Miami); 33180 (Miami)
- Area codes: 305, 786, 645
- FIPS code: 12-51125
- GNIS feature ID: 2403371

Ojus is a census-designated place and formerly incorporated town in Miami-Dade County, Florida, United States. It is part of the Miami metropolitan area of South Florida. The population was 19,673 at the 2020 census, up from 18,036 in 2010. The name "Ojus" is from the Seminole word for "plenty" or "lots of".

== History ==
During the late nineteenth century, settlers established farms along the Oleta River. These settlers grew peas, beans, sugar cane, and tomatoes. Seminoles set up a trading post near present-day Greynolds Park to conduct business with the Ojus settlers. In 1897, Albert Fitch named the area "Ojus" after the Seminole word for "plenty" or "lots of". After the turn of the century, rock was discovered in the area that was ideal for road building. Many of the neighborhood lakes were created during the early part of the twentieth century to support the construction of the area's infrastructure.

State representative Graham W. King lived in Ojus.

Voters initially approved the Town of Ojus on April 12, 1926 only to have this set aside by the state supreme court due to invalid boundary specifications. A second vote for incorporation was approved by voters on August 31, 1926. In 1927, the Town of Ojus was abolished by the state as a municipal government and re-established as a municipal corporation, along with other charter changes. In 1929, a court upheld the city council's refusal of the mayor's order for a charter election. Subsequently the state passed a bill calling for the abolishment of the town, which was rejected by voters. In 1931, the state abolished the Town of Ojus with voter approval on July 15, 1931. A court rescinded this on October 26, 1933 due to the outstanding debt associated with the town. The town was dissolved on August 8, 1935 after the state again abolished the town with voters approving on August 6, 1935. This time, the state was explicit regarding the handling of, and a mechanism to eliminate, the town's debt.

Two landmarks were created in the early part of the twentieth century, but only one survives. In 1925, Carl Fischer constructed the Fulford–Miami Speedway in the present-day Sky Lake neighborhood. The wooden race track was then billed as the world's fastest. It was unfortunately destroyed by the devastating 1926 hurricane. One of the region's most notable features, Greynolds Park, was established in 1936 as part of President Franklin Roosevelt's Civilian Conservation Corps (CCC) "New Deal" programs. The park was named after Mr. A.O. Greynolds, owner of the Ojus Rock Company, who donated 110 acres (45 ha) of his property in exchange for naming the park after him. Over the years, the park has expanded to include a golf course and a boathouse, and even hosted popular musical acts during the 1960s such as the Grateful Dead. Greynolds Park was declared a historic site in 1983.

On June 6, 2006, the Ojus Urban Area District (OUAD) was formed as a result of recommendations in the Ojus Charrette Report to plan for the future of the Ojus Area in response to a request for a planning report for Ojus.

In 2018, county referendum 6 narrowly failed to form a new municipality from portions of Ojus, Skylake and Highland Lakes.

== Geography ==
Ojus is located in northeastern Miami-Dade County 15 miles (24 km) north-northeast of downtown Miami. Its northern boundary is the Broward County line. Ojus is bordered in Miami-Dade County by Aventura to the east, North Miami Beach to the south, and Ives Estates to the west, while neighboring Broward County communities are Pembroke Park to the northwest and Hallandale Beach to the north.

Interstate 95 forms the western border of the community and provides access via Exit 16 (Ives Dairy Road). U.S. Route 1 (Biscayne Boulevard) runs parallel to the eastern border, just inside the Aventura city limits.

According to the United States Census Bureau, the Ojus CDP has a total area of 3.16 square miles (8.2 km^{2}), of which 2.65 square miles (6.9 km^{2}) are land and 0.51 square miles (1.3 km^{2}), or 16.14%, are water. The Oleta River drains the east side of the community. Elevation ranges from 0 to 12 feet (0.0 to 3.7 m) above sea level.

It is in the Eastern Standard Time Zone.

=== Surrounding areas ===
- Hallandale Beach
- Aventura
- North Miami Beach
- Ives Estates

== Demographics ==
Historical population
Census	Pop.	Note	%±
1980	17,344		—
1990	15,519		−10.5%
2000	16,642		7.2%
2010	18,036		8.4%
2020	19,673		9.1%
U.S. Decennial Census

=== Racial and ethnic composition ===
Ojus CDP, Florida – Racial and ethnic composition Note: the US Census treats Hispanic/Latino as an ethnic category. This table excludes Latinos from the racial categories and assigns them to a separate category. Hispanics/Latinos may be of any race.
Race / Ethnicity (NH = Non-Hispanic)	Pop 2010	Pop 2020	% 2010	% 2020
White alone (NH)	7,772	6,737	43.09%	34.24%
Black or African American alone (NH)	1,611	1,544	8.93%	7.85%
Native American or Alaska Native alone (NH)	4	9	0.02%	0.05%
Asian alone (NH)	364	397	2.02%	2.02%
Pacific Islander or Native Hawaiian alone (NH)	6	0	0.05%	0.00%
Other race alone (NH)	76	172	0.42%	0.87%
Mixed race or Multiracial alone (NH)	221	630	1.23%	3.20%
Hispanic or Latino (any race)	7,979	10,184	44.24%	51.77%
Total	18,036	19,673	100.00%	100.00%

=== 2020 census ===
As of the 2020 census, Ojus had a population of 19,673. The median age was 42.4 years. 20.9% of residents were under the age of 18 and 18.2% of residents were 65 years of age or older. For every 100 females there were 88.5 males, and for every 100 females age 18 and over there were 85.1 males age 18 and over.

There were 7,882 households in Ojus, of which 29.4% had children under the age of 18 living in them. Of all households, 44.0% were married-couple households, 19.0% were households with a male householder and no spouse or partner present, and 31.8% were households with a female householder and no spouse or partner present. About 28.9% of all households were made up of individuals and 12.4% had someone living alone who was 65 years of age or older. There were 4,257 families residing in the CDP.

There were 8,635 housing units, of which 8.7% were vacant. The homeowner vacancy rate was 1.9% and the rental vacancy rate was 9.4%.

100.0% of residents lived in urban areas, while 0.0% lived in rural areas.

Racial composition as of the 2020 census
Race	Number	Percent
White	9,460	48.1%
Black or African American	1,665	8.5%
American Indian and Alaska Native	51	0.3%
Asian	412	2.1%
Native Hawaiian and Other Pacific Islander	1	0.0%
Some other race	2,167	11.0%
Two or more races	5,917	30.1%
Hispanic or Latino (of any race)	10,184	51.8%

=== 2010 census ===
As of the 2010 United States census, there were 18,036 people, 6,263 households, and 4,138 families residing in the CDP.

=== 2000 census ===
As of the census of 2000, there were 16,642 people, 7,089 households, and 4,345 families residing in the CDP. The population density was 5,973.2 inhabitants per square mile (2,306.3/km^{2}). There were 8,035 housing units at an average density of 2,883.9 per square mile (1,113.5/km^{2}). The racial makeup of the CDP was 85.09% White (59.5% were Non-Hispanic White), 7.05% African American, 0.13% Native American, 1.74% Asian, 0.04% Pacific Islander, 3.08% from other races, and 2.86% from two or more races. Hispanic or Latino of any race were 30.60% of the population.

As of 2000, there were 7,089 households, out of which 27.6% had children under the age of 18 living with them, 46.2% were married couples living together, 11.3% had a female householder with no husband present, and 38.7% were non-families. Of all households, 33.1% were made up of individuals, and 16.5% had someone living alone who was 65 years of age or older. The average household size was 2.33 and the average family size was 2.98.

In 2000, in the CDP, the population was spread out, with 21.5% under the age of 18, 6.4% from 18 to 24, 26.9% from 25 to 44, 25.6% from 45 to 64, and 19.5% who were 65 years of age or older. The median age was 42 years. For every 100 females, there were 87.3 males. For every 100 females age 18 and over, there were 83.0 males.

In 2000, the median income for a household in the CDP was $33,294, and the median income for a family was $41,693. Males had a median income of $34,773 versus $28,781 for females. The per capita income for the CDP was $25,392. About 11.1% of families and 13.5% of the population were below the poverty line, including 14.2% of those under age 18 and 15.8% of those age 65 or over.

As of 2000, speakers of English as a first language accounted for 47.42% of residents, while Spanish made up 32.70%, Russian was at 3.35%, Yiddish was at 2.96%, Hebrew at 2.92%, and the mother tongue of French Creole was 2.41% of the population's speakers. Both Portuguese and French tied with 2.11% of the populace. Arabic made up 0.74% of speakers, while both Chinese and German were spoken by 0.55% of all residents. Also, both Greek and Hungarian were a mother tongue of 0.52% of the population.

== Education ==
Miami-Dade County Public Schools operates public schools. Ojus Elementary School is in Ojus. Students are zoned to Krop High School.

The Roman Catholic Archdiocese of Miami operates Catholic schools. St. Lawrence K-8 School is in Ojus.

Samuel Scheck Hillel Community Day School is in Ojus.
