= Plantation Walk =

- Location: Plantation, Florida, United States
- Coordinates: 26.124916°N 80.257680°W
- Opened: 1988 (as Fashion Mall), 2017 (as Plantation Walk)
- Closed: October 15, 2007 (as Fashion Mall)
- Developer: Melvin Simon & Associates (Fashion Mall); CallisonRTKL Inc. (Plantation Walk)
- Owner: U.S. Capital Holdings Group
- Architect: CallisonRTKL Inc., Associate Architects
- Num. of stores: 110
- Num. of anchor tenants: 2
- Floor area: 660,000 sq ft (61,000 m^{2})
- Floors: 3
- Parking: A large six-story lot for the main mall, a smaller, two-story lot for Lord and Taylor, and a ground lot for Macy's.
- Website: plantationwalk.com

Plantation Walk is a mixed-use complex in Plantation, Florida, a suburb of Fort Lauderdale. The complex includes the office tower, hotel and parking decks from the demolished Fashion Mall, a three-level shopping mall that opened in 1988 and closed in December 2006 following hurricane damage.

== History ==
Fashion Mall opened with Lord and Taylor as an anchor store in early 1988. Thereafter, Macy's opened in time for the busy 1988 Holiday shopping season before the rest of the mall was completed. The Lord and Taylor store closed in 2003, when the chain exited the state of Florida. After a series of sales, the property was acquired by U.S. Capital Holdings Group in 2004. The Macy's remained open until 2005, when Hurricane Wilma caused significant damage to the store; on 26 July 2006, Macy's announced it was permanently closing the Fashion Mall store.

== Leadup to closure ==
After Lord & Taylor and Macy's closed, the occupancy dwindled to fewer than 20 stores. Adding to the center's woes was the hurricane damage and an agreement signed by the previous owners with the city of Plantation, agreeing to install upgrades to the mall's fire safety systems. While U.S. Capital Holdings Group considered plans to repair and renovate the property, the city pressed to have the upgrades installed, since the deficiencies had been noted since 2003 unbeknownst to the owner and it was claimed that nothing had been done to remediate them.

After a number of discussions between the city and the owner, the cost to remedy the city's requirements was considered excessive and unwarranted by the new owner, unless part of the total mall renovation. Without an amicable resolution, the city informed the mall's tenants that they would be required to vacate their locations in the mall by October 15, 2007, and that any occupational licenses held by tenants of the center were revoked.

== Redevelopment ==
On 25 January 2007, U.S. Capital announced plans to develop the project into a mixed-use lifestyle destination, named 321 North (for its address on University Drive). The plan calls for a significant portion of the mall structure to be demolished, and the retail portion to be reconfigured to street-front stores. The company received site plan approval in November 2008 and began renovations. However, the recession that took full effect in South Florida in late 2008 and 2009 brought the project to a halt. Through 2010 and 2011, legal issues plagued the mall. However, under the auspices of a Chapter 11 restructure in late 2012, ownership was ready to move forward again.

== Current status ==
US Capital Holdings Group is moving forward with plans to transform the former Fashion Mall into the only true mixed-use lifestyle destination in west Broward County, integrating retail, office, and residential components synergistically into one project. The 1.5 million-square-foot project will feature a diverse range of retail, dining, entertainment and cultural experiences, as well as office rental opportunities and a self-contained residential community.

In the first phase, the existing office building will be renovated and reconfigured with new state-of-the-art technology and improvements to the common areas and adjacent, covered parking deck. Tenant installations will follow and are anticipated to be completed second quarter 2015. In following phases, residential towers are planned and much of the former Fashion Mall will be torn down as U.S. Capital converts the retail space from an enclosed environment into spaces that have primary frontage and visibility to University Drive. More office space and improved parking are planned, along with new landscaping. In anticipation of the changes, the company purchased Merritt Flower Shop.

In May 2014, the majority owner, Chinese company Tangshan Ganglu Iron & Steel Co., accused project manager and minority owner Wei Chen of misappropriating $48.7 million of its funds.

In October 2014, The developers of the Fashion Mall in Plantation voluntarily filed for Chapter 7 bankruptcy. The bankruptcy will place the mall in the hands of professional fiduciaries. It is unknown whether this will delay the redevelopment.

In 2016, Fashion Mall was demolished, leaving only the Sheraton Suites hotel, the office tower, and the parking decks. In 2017, plans were announced for a new mixed-use complex on the site, named Plantation Walk. The complex will contain the 160,000 existing office tower, and the Sheraton Suites, both of which are being remodeled. In addition, 700 apartments and 200,000 square feet of retail and restaurants will be constructed.
