= Florida State Road 852 =

State highway in Florida, United States

State Road 852
- County Line Road / Northwest 215th Street

Route information
- Maintained by FDOT
- Length: 2.534 mi (4.078 km)
- Existed: 1983 (as SR 852)–present

Major junctions
- West end: SR 817 / Florida's Turnpike Extension in Miami Gardens / Miramar
- Florida's Turnpike in Miami Gardens / Miramar
- East end: US 441 in Miami Gardens / Miramar

Location
- Country: United States
- State: Florida
- Counties: Miami-Dade, Broward

Highway system
- Florida State Highway System; Interstate; US; State; Former; Pre‑1945; Toll; Scenic
← SR 850	→ SR 854

State Road 852 (SR 852), locally known as County Line Road and North 215th Street, is a 2.534-mile-long (4.078 km) east-west four lane divided highway straddling the boundary between Broward and Miami-Dade counties in Florida. The western terminus is an intersection with SR 817 (West 27th Avenue in Miami-Dade County, University Drive in Broward); the eastern terminus is an intersection with U.S. Route 441 (US 441) / SR 7 in Broward County, Northwest 2nd Avenue in Miami-Dade. The state road designation is omitted on many maps, but the street itself is signed by the Florida Department of Transportation.

== Route description ==
State Road 852 begins at SR 817 at the intersection with the eastbound exit from the HEFT to SR 817, with SR 852 heading east as County Line Road as a divided four-lane highway. The westernmost mile of SR 852 is wedged between the property line of Calder Race Track and an embankment atop which the Turnpike extension is constructed. At roughly the midpoint of SR 852 are onramps to the mainline Turnpike (SR 91). East of the Turnpike interchange, County Line Road passes through a residential area and near the eastern terminus, passes by a collection of television and radio transmission towers. State Road 852 ends at the intersection with US 441/SR 7.

Beyond the eastern terminus of State Road 852, County Line Road become an undivided two lane road as it passes through a suburban residential area until it ends at Dr. Michael M. Krop High School west of Interstate 95.

== History ==
Prior to a change of designation in 1983, the same stretch of County Line Road was signed State Road 872 by FDOT (at the same time SR 852 signs lined a street that later became SR 854, also in 1983), one mile (1.6 km) to the south of County Line Road.

== Major intersections ==
County	Location	mi	km	Destinations	Notes
Miami-Dade–Broward county line	Miami Gardens–Miramar line	0.000	0.000	SR 817 (University Drive / Northwest 27th Avenue) to Florida's Turnpike Extension south (SR 821)	Western terminus, exit 47 (Turnpike Extension)
Miami-Dade–Broward county line	Miami Gardens–Miramar line	1.07	1.72	Florida's Turnpike (SR 91) to I-95 / SR 826 – Orlando, Airport, Stadium	Part of the Turnpike / SR 817 interchange (exit 47); entrance to Turnpike only
Miami-Dade–Broward county line	Miami Gardens–Miramar line	2.534	4.078	US 441 (Northwest 2nd Avenue / SR 7) / County Line Road	Eastern terminus
1.000 mi = 1.609 km; 1.000 km = 0.621 mi: Incomplete access
