= Dolph Map Company =

U.S. publisher

The Dolph Map Company is a U.S. publisher of city and state road maps, based in Fort Lauderdale, Florida.

Dolph Map Company was founded in 1926 by Frank Dolph Sr., a one-time employee of the New York-based Hagstrom Map Company. Dolph has specialized in highly detailed commercial and custom maps of cities in the southeastern United States, especially within the state of Florida. The company also publishes wall maps, waterway maps, digitally disseminated maps, maps on CD, print street atlases, and has published for phone directories and law enforcement agencies.

During the period between 1950 and 2000, Dolph published maps for cities in more than 20 states, though their primary focus has been the Southeastern US, and many of the 1950s and 1960s maps of cities in the Midwest and other parts of the U.S. have gone out of print.

As of 2010, maps of cities in Georgia, South Carolina, Virginia and Texas are also listed in their catalog, and custom-produced maps of cities elsewhere in the southern U.S. are commonly available through banks, real estate agencies and business organizations. The family business was run by Frank Dolph Sr., his son Frank Dolph Jr., and Frank Jr.'s son Ryan Dolph. In 2002, it was rebranded GIS Dolph Map.
