= Florida State Road 848 =

State highway in Florida, United States

State Road 848 and County Road 848
- Stirling Road

Route information
- Length: 6.726 mi (10.824 km)

Major junctions
- West end: SR 817 in Cooper City
- US 441 / SR 7 in Hollywood; I-95 in Dania Beach
- East end: US 1 in Dania Beach

Location
- Country: United States
- State: Florida
- County: Broward

Highway system
- Florida State Highway System; Interstate; US; State; Former; Pre‑1945; Toll; Scenic
← SR 847	→ SR 849

Stirling Road is an east–west commuter highway in Broward County, Florida, designated State Road 848 (SR 848) and County Road 848 (CR 848). The road's western terminus is at an intersection with SW 166th Ave in Southwest Ranches. At University Drive (SR 817) in Davie, the county road designation ends and the state road designation begins, and the road continues east to Federal Highway (U.S. Route 1 or US 1) in downtown Dania Beach.

The speed limit is 45 miles per hour (72 km/h) for the length of the route.

== Route description ==
Stirling Road begins at SW 166th Ave in Southwest Ranches with the hidden designation of County Road 848 and continues east through the cities of Southwest Ranches, Cooper City and Davie. Stirling Road also has several other, disconnected, sections between the dead end and US 27 (SR 25).

State Road 848 begins at Stirling Road's intersection with University Drive (SR 817) in Davie. The road then goes east, entering the Hollywood Seminole Indian Reservation after it crosses over Florida's Turnpike (SR 91) without an interchange. After the intersection with US 441/SR 7 in Hollywood at the eastern end of the Hollywood Seminole Indian Reservation, SR 848 takes Stirling Road east as a four lane divided highway, through mostly residential areas, scattered with commercial businesses. East of the intersection with Lakeshore Drive, Stirling Road forms the southern boundary with Dania Beach, as the road becomes more commercial, quickly approaching the interchange with Interstate 95 (I-95). At the southeast corner of the interchange with I-95 (SR 9) was the site of Six Flags Atlantis, a water park that was in existence in the 1980s and early 1990s. After the closing and demolition of the park, the Oakwood Plaza shopping center was built in its place. Just east of the shopping center, Stirling Road crosses a canal and leaves Hollywood and enters Dania Beach, through more commercial establishments before terminating at US 1.

== Major intersections ==
The entire route is in Broward County.

Location	mi	km	Destinations	Notes
Cooper City–Davie line	0.000	0.000	SR 817 (University Drive)	Transition from CR 848 to SR 848
Hollywood Seminole Reservation–Hollywood line	2.656	4.274	US 441 / SR 7 to Florida's Turnpike	
Hollywood–Dania Beach line	5.56	8.95	I-95 – West Palm Beach, Miami	Exit 22 on I-95 (unsigned SR 9)
Dania Beach	6.726	10.824	US 1 (Federal Highway) to SR A1A	Unsigned SR 5; continues east as a local street
1.000 mi = 1.609 km; 1.000 km = 0.621 mi
