= Homestead Extension of Florida's Turnpike =

Highway in Florida

Homestead Extension of Florida's Turnpike
- SR 821; Ronald Reagan Turnpike
- Homestead Extension highlighted in red

Route information
- Maintained by Florida's Turnpike Enterprise
- Length: 47.856 mi (77.017 km) 308.757 mi (496.896 km) including mainline
- Existed: May 1, 1973–present
- Component highways: SR 821 (unsigned) entire length

Major junctions
- South end: US 1 in Florida City
- SR 874 in Kendall; US 41 in University Park, Sweetwater and Tamiami; SR 836 in Fontainebleau and Tamiami; US 27 in Hialeah Gardens; I-75 in Hialeah and Miramar
- North end: Florida's Turnpike in Miramar

Location
- Country: United States
- State: Florida
- Counties: Miami-Dade, Broward

Highway system
- Florida State Highway System; Interstate; US; State; Former; Pre‑1945; Toll; Scenic
| ← SR 820 | SR 821 | → SR 822 |

The Homestead Extension of Florida's Turnpike (HEFT), designated as unsigned State Road 821 (SR 821), is the southern extension of Florida's Turnpike, a controlled-access toll road in the U.S. state of Florida maintained by Florida's Turnpike Enterprise (FTE). Spanning approximately 48 miles (77 km) along a north–south axis, it supplements the 265-mile (426 km) mainline (designated as SR 91) to form the complete 309-mile (497 km) turnpike. The extension begins at its southern terminus at U.S. Route 1 (US 1) in Florida City, and transitions into the SR 91 mainline in Miramar at its northern end. Despite their designations as different state roads, the mainline and the extension are continuous in their exit numbering.

It was opened in stages between 1973 and 1974, after the mainline of the Turnpike was completed, and is used by both commuters and travelers to the Florida Keys and Everglades National Park. Due to its alignment, it acts as a de facto outer beltway for Miami, with the Palmetto Expressway (State Road 826) forming an inner beltway.

== Route description ==
The road begins at its south end at a partial interchange with US 1 in Florida City next to the Florida Keys Outlet Center, where the road heads northeast as a four lane expressway. Travelers to here from the northern parts of the Turnpike Extension can continue south along US 1 to the Florida Keys or the Everglades National Park (via SR 9336). This point also marks the beginning of the HEFT's hidden designation of State Road 821.

Between Florida City and Cutler Bay, the HEFT acts as an alternative highway for the communities along US 1. The first 16 miles of the tollway are located within mostly new residential developments that were constructed after Hurricane Andrew, which destroyed most of the area in 1992. Some farms line the rest of this stretch. The first interchange northbound is Campbell Drive / Southwest 312th Street in Homestead, which allows travelers to access the Homestead Hospital and the Homestead-Miami Speedway. The Turnpike then has an exit with Southwest 288th Street at mile 5, providing a connection to the Homestead Air Reserve Base, before leaving Homestead and entering parts of unincorporated Miami-Dade County. At mile 6, the tollway has a southbound exit and northbound entry for Southwest 137th Avenue, with the HEFT heading east-northeast until the exit with SR 989 (Allapattah Road / Southwest 112th Avenue) at mile 9. The road then curves to a northerly direction towards the Homestead Toll Gantry, the first of four on the route, at mile 10. It then enters Cutler Bay, where the highway is also known as the John F. Cosgrove Highway for the next five miles. The first exit in Cutler Bay is with Southwest 216th Street/Cutler Ridge Blvd at mile 11, followed by another at Caribbean Blvd at mile 12. Following exit 11, the turnpike widens to six lanes. The tollway then crosses back over US 1 at the Southland Mall and leaves Cutler Bay. Continuing north, the HEFT serves SR 994 (Quail Roost Drive) at exit 13 and gains another lane in each direction. This is followed by SR 992 (Coral Reef Drive (Southwest 152nd Street)) at exit 16, which marks the northern terminus of the John F. Cosgrove Highway.

The tollway passes through older, predominantly residential areas for the next ten miles. Between exits 16 and 17, the Turnpike Extension swells to ten lanes; this section of the tollway also has the highest traffic count at 172,000 vehicles per day (as of 2014). Past exit 17, where SR 874 (Don Shula Expressway) leaves the HEFT to connect to SR 826 (Palmetto Expressway), the tollway drops back to six lanes and soon reaches an interchange with Southwest 120th Street at mile 19. Just north of the Southwest 120th Street exit, still at mile 19, lies the Snapper Creek Service plaza, which is located on the center median with access from both directions and is the only plaza on the extension; unlike the more robust services along the mainline, it only offers a convenience store inside the gas station. The next exit is with SR 94 (Kendall Drive), followed by the Bird Road Toll Gantry at mile 23; from here, the HEFT takes a beeline path north for the next ten miles. The next exit is with SR 976 (Southwest 40th Street), after which the HEFT gains two extra lanes in preparation for the next two exits. After the tollway forms the western end of the Florida International University campus, it meets Tamiami Trail (US 41) at exit 25, and then SR 836 (Dolphin Expressway) at exit 26 in Fontainebleau, which provides access to Miami International Airport eastbound.

North of this interchange, the Turnpike Extension enters a stretch where it forms the border between undeveloped Miami-Dade County to the west and residential developments to the east for the rest of its journey in the county, its width varying between six and eight lanes, with exits at Northwest 12th Street at mile 26, Northwest 41st Street at mile 29, and at Northwest 74th Street at mile 31. Half a mile north of Northwest 74th Street lies the Okeechobee Toll gantry, with the HEFT then intersecting Northwest 106th Street/Beacon Station Boulevard at mile 34. The tollway starts to curve in a north-easterly direction and comes to exit 35 with US 27. Afterwards, the expressway fully enters an undeveloped portion of Miami-Dade County until the next exit at I-75 northbound at exit 39, which is a northbound only exit, with the southbound direction of the Turnpike Extension receiving some traffic from I-75 south. North of the I-75 interchange, the HEFT becomes a four-laned highway again. It crosses the Broward County line, entering the suburban community of Miramar, and then curves eastward. The expressway has an interchange with SR 823 (Red Road) at exit 43, after which the Turnpike Extension is just one block north of the Miami-Dade County line for the remainder of the tollway's length. Residential and commercial developments line both sides of the HEFT through here. The next exit is with SR 817 (University Drive) at exit 46, allowing access to Hard Rock Stadium and the Calder Race Course. The Miramar Toll gantry then follows the interchange before the Turnpike Extension ends four miles north of the Golden Glades Interchange at the mainline of Florida's Turnpike.

== Tolls ==
The HEFT is an all-electronic toll road. Tolls are only accepted via SunPass transponders or by toll-by-plate billing at a higher cost. Cash is not accepted. The toll gantries are located at the former toll plazas, which closed on February 19, 2011. As of July 1, 2015, the total cost for a two-axled vehicle to drive the whole length of the Turnpike Extension is $4.24 with SunPass and $5.28 via the toll-by-plate system. The HEFT has a toll gantry approximately every 12 miles (19 km). In addition to the mainline toll gantries, most interchanges have individual toll gantries for entering or exiting vehicles; typically, these can be found either on the northbound entry and southbound exit, or the southbound entry and northern exit. Most of these gantries charge $0.53 via SunPass or $0.79 via toll-by-plate per entry or exit, but the Allapattah Road, Northwest 74th Street and Northwest 27th Avenue interchanges charge $0.79 via SunPass or $1.06 via toll-by-plate.

== Services ==
The Snapper Creek service plaza is the lone service plaza on the HEFT, located at mile 19 in the median of the expressway. It is accessible from both directions. The service plaza is open 24 hours a day, featuring a gas station and a convenience store.

== History ==
After the turnpike mainline was completed in 1964, the turnpike authority (precursor to Florida's Turnpike Enterprise) explored several extensions to the turnpike system, including an expressway in western Dade County from Florida City to the turnpike mainline at the Dade–Broward county line. Construction on the tollway began in July 1971. The northernmost 13 miles (21 km) of the tollway between US 27 and the turnpike mainline were opened to traffic on May 1, 1973, at a cost of $22 million and a $0.40 toll to motorists. During the first half of 1974, the expressway between Campbell Drive (SW 312th Street) and US 27 was opened in five stages; the road running uninterrupted from the turnpike in Miramar to Homestead on May 20, 1974, with the last section to Florida City to US 1 completed later in 1974. The total toll of the expressway was $0.80. The HEFT has used mile-based exit numbers and an open toll collection system since its opening; both concepts that were implemented on the rurnpike mainline in the late 1980s and early 1990s.

On April 27, 1986, the Okeechobee toll plaza opened with a $.25 toll, with this the toll plaza at the US 27 exit was removed. Tolls at the Miramar plaza were also lowered from $.40 to $.25.

On February 2, 1989, tolls on the expressway doubled from $1.00 to $2.00, with $.50 charged at each toll plaza. Toll hikes, raising the cost of traveling the expressway from $2 to $3 were supposed to take effect on the Homestead Extension in 1993 to match the rest of the turnpike, but Hurricane Andrew's impact in the area in 1992 had the state delay toll hikes on the highway until July 9, 1995.

In 1997, the Bird Road toll plaza was reconfigured to a two-part form to accommodate the then-bottleneck section of the expressway.

In 1998, the road, like with the mainline, was designated as the Ronald Reagan Turnpike.

The SunPass electronic toll collection system was implemented during 1999; the toll plazas were reconfigured to allow lanes dedicated to transponder users.

A toll hike took effect on March 7, 2004, increasing the toll rate for non SunPass users to $4 for a full-length trip; with SunPass users still used the 1995 toll rates.

The portion of the HEFT between exits 11 (Cutler Ridge Boulevard) and 16 (SR 992) was designated the "John F. Cosgrove Highway" in 2008 by the Florida Legislature, following his death in 2006. A lawyer and former legislator, Cosgrove was also the first mayor of Cutler Bay, a city along the HEFT. He was instrumental in passing legislation to keep insurers from leaving the state following Hurricane Andrew.

In November 2009, plans were announced to convert the road to all electronic tolling. By February 19, 2011, the implementation was entirely complete. The staffed toll plazas were converted into all electronic toll gantries, and the only ways to pay are either by SunPass transponders or billing through the toll-by-plate program.

In 2007, legislation was passed in Florida to index toll rates across the state to the national consumer price index (CPI), to be enacted by the end of June 2012. As a result, the toll rates on the HEFT were raised on June 24, 2012, an increase of 11.7% to reflect the previous five years. In keeping with the legislation, SunPass and toll-by-plate rates were then raised again on July 1, 2013, by 2.1%. Since the indexing of tolls to the national CPI, the entry and exit toll rates have risen by approximately 30 cents, in some cases more than double their pre-2012 rates.

Construction was completed in 2018 on a project to add express lanes from Eureka Drive to the Don Shula Expressway.

== Exit list ==
Despite being designated by the Florida Department of Transportation as a separate route (SR 821) from the main portion of Florida's Turnpike (SR 91), the HEFT's exit numbers are regarded to be a continuation of the Turnpike's mainline.

| County | Location | mi | km | Exit | Destinations | Notes |
|---|---|---|---|---|---|---|
| Miami-Dade | Florida City | 0.000 | 0.000 | 1 | US 1 – Florida City, Key West | Southern Terminus of Turnpike, HEFT, and SR 821 |
| Miami-Dade | Homestead | 3.133 | 5.042 | 2 | Campbell Drive / Southwest 312th Street – Homestead | Tolled northbound exit and southbound entrance; Access to Homestead Hospital and Homestead-Miami Speedway |
| Miami-Dade | Leisure City | 5.274 | 8.488 | 5 | Biscayne Drive / Southwest 288th Street | Tolled northbound exit and southbound entrance; Access to Homestead-Miami Speedway and Homestead Air Reserve Base |
| Miami-Dade | Princeton | 6.124 | 9.856 | 6 | Speedway Boulevard / Southwest 137th Avenue | Southbound exit and northbound entrance; Access to Homestead-Miami Speedway and Homestead Air Reserve Base |
| Miami-Dade | Princeton | 9.199 | 14.804 | 9 | SR 989 (Southwest 112th Avenue) | Tolled northbound exit and southbound entrance; signed as exits 9A (south) and 9B (north) southbound |
| Miami-Dade | Princeton | 10.5 | 16.9 | Homestead Gantry | | |
| Miami-Dade | Cutler Bay | 11.787 | 18.969 | 11 | Southwest 216th Street / Cutler Ridge Boulevard | |
| Miami-Dade | Cutler Bay | 12.529 | 20.163 | 12 | Caribbean Boulevard / Southwest 200th Street | Access to US 1 via Caribbean Boulevard; access to Southland Mall |
| Miami-Dade | South Miami Heights–Palmetto Estates line | 13.902 | 22.373 | 13 | SR 994 (Quail Roost Drive) / Eureka Drive | |
| Miami-Dade | Richmond Heights–Palmetto Estates line | 16.241 | 26.137 | 16 (NB); 18 (SB) | SR 992 (Southwest 152nd Street) / Southwest 117th Avenue | Tolled northbound exit and southbound entrance; access to Jackson South Medical Center and Zoo Miami via Southwest 152nd Street |
| Miami-Dade | Kendall | 17.907 | 28.819 | 17 | SR 874 north (Don Shula Expressway) to SR 826 – Miami | Northbound exit and southbound entrance; south end of SR 874 (tolled road) |
| Miami-Dade | Kendall | 18.448 | 29.689 | 19 | Southwest 120th Street | Tolled northbound exit and southbound entrance |
| Miami-Dade | Kendall | 18.845 | 30.328 | Snapper Creek Service Plaza | | |
| Miami-Dade | Kendall | 20.459 | 32.926 | 20 | SR 94 (Kendall Drive / Southwest 88th Street) | Tolled northbound exit and southbound entrance |
| Miami-Dade | Kendale Lakes | 22.0 | 35.4 | Bird Road Gantry | | |
| Miami-Dade | Westchester–Tamiami– Westwood Lakes tripoint | 23.755 | 38.230 | 23 | SR 976 (Southwest 40th Street) | Tolled southbound exit and northbound entrance; northbound exit and entrance is via Southwest 117th Avenue; access to HCA Florida Kendall Hospital |
| Miami-Dade | Westchester–Tamiami– Sweetwater tripoint | 25.762 | 41.460 | 25 | US 41 (Southwest 8th Street) | Tolled southbound exit and northbound entrance; southbound signed as exits 25A (west) and 25B (east); access to Florida International University |
| Miami-Dade | Fontainebleau–Tamiami– Doral tripoint | 26.774 | 43.089 | 26 | SR 836 east (Dolphin Expressway) to SR 826 – Miami, Miami International Airport | Dolphin Expressway is tolled; Southbound connects to westbound Dolphin Expressway via exit 27 |
| Miami-Dade | Fontainebleau–Tamiami– Doral tripoint | 27.225 | 43.814 | 27 | SR 836 west (Dolphin Expressway) | Southbound to westbound connection via shared southbound exit ramp with Northwest 12th Street; No northbound connection to westbound 836; Dolphin Expressway is tolled; Opened October 23, 2024 |
| Miami-Dade | Fontainebleau–Tamiami– Doral tripoint | 27.225 | 43.814 | 27 | Northwest 12th Street | Tolled northbound exit and southbound entrance; access to Dolphin Mall |
| Miami-Dade | Doral | 29.257 | 47.085 | 29 | Northwest 41st Street | Tolled northbound exit and southbound entrance |
| Miami-Dade | Doral | 31.222 | 50.247 | 31 | Northwest 74th Street | Tolled northbound exit and southbound entrance; opened 2010; to SR 934 |
| Miami-Dade | Doral | 31.8 | 51.2 | Okeechobee Gantry | | |
| Miami-Dade | | 33.280 | 53.559 | 34 | Flagler Station Boulevard / Northwest 106th Street | Tolled southbound exit and northbound entrance |
| Miami-Dade | Hialeah Gardens | 35.408 | 56.984 | 35 | US 27 (Okeechobee Road) | Tolled southbound exit and northbound entrance |
| Miami-Dade | Hialeah Gardens | 37 | 60 | 37 | Northwest 170th Street | Diverging-diamond interchange opened on April 21, 2026; tolled southbound exit and northbound entrance |
| Miami-Dade–Broward county line | Hialeah–Miramar line | 39.491 | 63.555 | 39 | I-75 north – Naples | Northbound exit and southbound entrance; exit 5 on I-75 |
| Miami-Dade–Broward county line | Hialeah–Miramar line | 39.491 | 63.555 | 39 | I-75 / I-75 Express north to SR 860 – Naples, Miami | Southbound exit and northbound entrance; exit 5 on I-75; exit opened early 2019 |
| Miami-Dade–Broward county line | Hialeah–Miramar line | 39.491 | 63.555 | — | I-75 Express north | Left exit northbound and left entrance southbound; Northbound entrance shares ramp from mainline I-75 entrance; Opened early 2019 |
| Miami-Dade–Broward county line | Miramar–Country Club line | 43.369 | 69.796 | 43 | SR 823 (Red Road / Northwest 57th Avenue) | Tolled northbound exit and southbound entrance |
| Miami-Dade–Broward county line | Miramar–Miami Gardens line | 46.355 | 74.601 | 47 | SR 817 (Northwest 27th Avenue / University Drive) / SR 852 (Northwest 215th Street / County Line Road) | Tolled northbound exit and southbound entrance |
| Miami-Dade–Broward county line | Miramar–Miami Gardens line | 47.2 | 76.0 | Miramar Gantry | | |
| Miami-Dade–Broward county line | Miramar–Miami Gardens line | 47.458 | 76.376 | – | Florida's Turnpike south to I-95 / SR 826 / US 441 (SR 7) – Airport, Stadium | Northbound exit and southbound entrance to Turnpike Stub; exit 4X on Florida's Turnpike |
| Miami-Dade–Broward county line | Miramar–Miami Gardens line | 47.856 | 77.017 | – | Florida's Turnpike north – Orlando | Transition from HEFT to mainline Turnpike continues north; northern terminus of SR 821 |
1.000 mi = 1.609 km; 1.000 km = 0.621 mi: Electronic toll collection; Incomplete access; Route transition

=== Thru lanes ===
Thru lanes are separated from the general lanes, but all lanes pay the same general toll posted. All exits are unnumbered.

| County | Location | mi | km | Destinations | Notes |
|---|---|---|---|---|---|
| Miami-Dade | Princeton | 6.3 | 10.1 | Southwest 137th Avenue | Southern terminus of Thru lanes; Northbound entrance and southbound merges with mainline |
| Miami-Dade | South Miami Heights | 12.529– 13.952 | 20.163– 22.454 | Caribbean Boulevard | Southbound exit and entrance via local lanes |
| Miami-Dade | Cutler Bay | 12.529– 13.952 | 20.163– 22.454 | SR 994 Quail Roost Drive | Northbound exit and entrance via local lanes |
| Miami-Dade | Kendall | 17.907– 19 | 28.819– 31 | Southwest 120th Street / SR 874 to SR 826 – Miami International Airport, Miami | Thru lanes temporarily merge with mainline for Service Plaza access and Southwest 120th Street access; Direct interchange with SR-874 northbound exit southbound entrance only |
| Miami-Dade | Kendall | 21.9 | 35.2 | SR 94 (Southwest 88th Street / Kendall Drive) | Southbound exit via local lanes |
| Miami-Dade | Fontainebleau–Tamiami– Doral tripoint | 26.774 | 43.089 | SR 836 east – Miami International Airport | Direct interchange |
| Miami-Dade | Doral | | | Northwest 41st Street | Current terminus of thru lanes |
| Miami-Dade | Hialeah | | | Northwest 170th Street | Exit currently under construction |
| Miami-Dade–Broward county line | Hialeah–Miramar line | | | I-75 Express north | Future thru lanes segment; Exit is open for mainline |
| Miami-Dade–Broward county line | Miramar–Miami Gardens line | | | SR 817 (Northwest 27th Avenue / University Drive) | Future northern terminus of thru lanes |
1.000 mi = 1.609 km; 1.000 km = 0.621 mi: Electronic toll collection

== See also ==
- Florida's Turnpike
- John Cosgrove (Florida politician)
