= Pembroke Park, Florida =

Town in the state of Florida, United States

- Town
- Logo
- Motto: "The Small Town that Means Big Business"
- Interactive location map of Pembroke Park
- Coordinates: 25°59′07″N 80°10′40″W
- Country: United States
- State: Florida
- County: Broward
- Incorporated: December 10, 1957 as of Pembroke
- Incorporated: June 20, 1959 as of Pembroke Park

Government
  - Type: Council–Manager
  - Mayor: Geoffrey Jacobs
  - Vice Mayor: Musfika Kashem
  - Commissioner: Ashira Mohammed
  - Town Manager: David Lynch
  - Town Clerk: Cynthia Garcia-Lima
  - Town District: 1: Eric Morrissette; 2: William Hodgkins; 3: Geoffrey Jacobs; 4: Musfika Kashem; 5: Ashira Mohammed

Area
  - Total: 1.666 sq mi (4.315 km^{2})
  - Land: 1.428 sq mi (3.699 km^{2})
  - Water: 0.238 sq mi (0.616 km^{2}) 14.29%
- Elevation: 10 ft (3.0 m)

Population (2020)
  - Total: 6,260
  - Estimate (2024): 6,544
  - Density: 4,380/sq mi (1,690/km^{2})
- Time zone: UTC–5 (Eastern (EST))
  - Summer (DST): UTC–4 (EDT)
- ZIP Codes: 33009, 33021, 33023
- Area codes: 954 and 754
- FIPS code: 12-55750
- GNIS feature ID: 2407094
- Website: tppfl.gov

Pembroke Park is a town in Broward County, Florida, United States. The town took its name from its location along Pembroke Road. It is part of the Miami metropolitan area. Almost one-half of its residents live in mobile homes. The population was 6,260 at the 2020 census, and was estimated at 6,544 in 2024.

== Geography ==
According to the United States Census Bureau, the town has a total area of 1.666 square miles (4.31 km^{2}), of which 1.428 square miles (3.70 km^{2}) is land and 0.238 square miles (0.62 km^{2}) (14.29%) is water.

== Demographics ==
Historical population
Census	Pop.	Note	%±
1960	569		—
1970	2,949		418.3%
1980	5,326		80.6%
1990	4,933		−7.4%
2000	6,299		27.7%
2010	6,102		−3.1%
2020	6,260		2.6%
2024 (est.)	6,544	▲	4.5%
U.S. Decennial Census; 2020 Census

According to realtor website Zillow, the average price of a home as of November 30, 2025, in Waukee is $254,189.

As of the 2023 American Community Survey, there are 2,431 estimated households in Pembroke Park with an average of 2.52 persons per household. The town has a median household income of $50,710. Approximately 24.5% of the town's population lives at or below the poverty line. Pembroke Park has an estimated 58.5% employment rate, with 18.2% of the population holding a bachelor's degree or higher and 77.8% holding a high school diploma. There were 3,770 housing units at an average density of 2,640.06 per square mile (1,019.3/km^{2}).

The top five reported languages (people were allowed to report up to two languages, thus the figures will generally add to more than 100%) were English (35.8%), Spanish (31.9%), Indo-European (30.5%), Asian and Pacific Islander (0.0%), and Other (1.7%).

The median age in the town was 34.3 years.

=== Racial and ethnic composition ===
Pembroke Park, Florida – racial and ethnic composition Note: the US Census treats Hispanic/Latino as an ethnic category. This table excludes Latinos from the racial categories and assigns them to a separate category. Hispanics/Latinos may be of any race.
Race / ethnicity (NH = non-Hispanic)	Pop. 1990	Pop. 2000	Pop. 2010	Pop. 2020	% 1990	% 2000	% 2010	% 2020
White alone (NH)	3,713	2,118	1,519	757	72.57%	33.62%	24.89%	12.09%
Black or African American alone (NH)	709	2,993	3,252	3,300	14.37%	47.52%	53.29%	52.72%
Native American or Alaska Native alone (NH)	0	15	19	9	0.00%	0.24%	0.31%	0.14%
Asian alone (NH)	0	43	75	104	0.00%	0.68%	1.23%	1.66%
Pacific Islander alone (NH)	x	4	2	0	x	0.06%	0.03%	0.00%
Other race alone (NH)	0	22	19	50	0.00%	0.35%	0.31%	0.80%
Mixed race or multiracial (NH)	x	137	111	126	x	2.17%	1.82%	2.01%
Hispanic or Latino (any race)	511	967	1,105	1,914	10.36%	15.35%	18.11%	30.58%
Total	4,933	6,299	6,102	6,260	100.00%	100.00%	100.00%	100.00%

=== 2020 census ===
Pembroke Park Demographics
2020 census	Pembroke Park	Broward County	Florida
Total population	6,260	1,944,375	21,538,187
Population, percent change, 2010 to 2020	+2.59%	+11.23%	+14.56%
Population density	4,536.23 inhabitants per square mile (1,751.4/km^{2})	1,616.63 inhabitants per square mile (624.2/km^{2})	401.40 inhabitants per square mile (155.0/km^{2})
White or Caucasian	18.19%	39.92%	57.68%
Black or African-American	54.14%	27.36%	15.07%
Native American or Native Alaskan	0.45%	0.38%	0.44%
Asian	1.82%	3.90%	2.99%
Pacific Islander or Native Hawaiian	0.00%	0.05%	0.07%
Some Other Race	10.08%	8.60%	7.26%
Two or more races (Multiracial)	15.32%	19.79%	16.49%
Hispanic or Latino (of any race)	30.58%	31.31%	26.45%

As of the 2020 census, there were 6,260 people, 2,467 households, and 1,613 families residing in the town. The median age was 36.5 years. 25.4% of residents were under the age of 18 and 14.7% were 65 years of age or older. For every 100 females there were 84.3 males, and for every 100 females age 18 and over there were 79.5 males.

100.0% of residents lived in urban areas, while 0.0% lived in rural areas.

Of the 2,467 households, 37.4% had children under the age of 18 living in them. 29.8% were married-couple households, 21.9% were households with a male householder and no spouse or partner present, and 39.9% were households with a female householder and no spouse or partner present. About 28.6% of all households were made up of individuals, and 11.0% had someone living alone who was 65 years of age or older.

There were 3,756 housing units, of which 34.3% were vacant. The homeowner vacancy rate was 11.4% and the rental vacancy rate was 10.1%.

=== 2010 census ===
As of the 2010 census, there were 6,102 people, 2,488 households, and 1,639 families residing in the town. The population density was 4,486.76 inhabitants per square mile (1,732.3/km^{2}). There were 3,695 housing units at an average density of 2,716.91 per square mile (1,049.0/km^{2}). The racial makeup of the town was 37.64% White, 55.26% African American, 0.33% Native American, 1.28% Asian, 0.03% Pacific Islander, 2.36% from some other races and 3.10% from two or more races. Hispanic or Latino people of any race were 18.11% of the population.

=== 2000 census ===
As of the 2000 census, there were 6,299 people, 2,742 households, and 1,595 families residing in the town. The population density was 4,465.57 inhabitants per square mile (1,724.2/km^{2}). There were 4,406 housing units at an average density of 3,123.56 per square mile (1,206.0/km^{2}). The racial makeup of the town was 42.61% White, 48.98% African American, 0.37% Native American, 0.68% Asian, 0.06% Pacific Islander, 3.95% from some other races and 3.35% from two or more races. Hispanic or Latino people of any race were 15.35% of the population.

There were 2,742 households out of which 29.5% had children under the age of 18 living with them, 31.8% were married couples living together, 21.6% had a female householder with no husband present, and 41.8% were non-families. 33.7% of all households were made up of individuals, and 15.1% had someone living alone who was 65 years of age or older. The average household size was 2.29 and the average family size was 2.96.

In the town the population was spread out with 27.0% under the age of 18, 9.0% from 18 to 24, 28.0% from 25 to 44, 18.7% from 45 to 64, and 17.4% who were 65 years of age or older. The median age was 33 years. For every 100 females there were 85.4 males. For every 100 females age 18 and over, there were 79.3 males.

The median income for a household in the town was $22,605, and the median income for a family was $25,972. Males had a median income of $26,275 versus $21,230 for females. The per capita income for the town was $14,369. 24.0% of the population and 20.0% of families were below the poverty line, including 27.2% of those under age 18 and of those age 65 or older.

As of 2000, speakers of English as a first language was at 73.87%, while Spanish accounted for 11.49%, French 10.05% (most of whom are French Canadian), and French Creole at 4.57% of residents.

As of 2000, Pembroke Park had the sixth highest percentage of Canadian residents in the US (many of whom are French Canadians from Quebec), with 3.1% of the populace. It was also the fifth most British West Indian populace, at 1.1% (tied with Gordon Heights, New York), the twelfth highest percentage of Jamaican residents in the US, at 8% of the city's population, and the 137th highest percentage of Cuban residents in the US, at 1.52% of the city's population (tied with Goldenrod, Florida). It also had the 123rd most Dominicans in the US, at 1.25% (tied with three Northeast US areas), while it had the thirty-fourth highest percentage of Haitians (tied with South Floral Park, New York, as well as Pomona, New York and Lakeview, New York), at 5.4% of all residents.

== Education ==
Residents are zoned to schools in Broward County Public Schools:

- Almost all of the town is zoned to Lake Forest Elementary School, and a portion is zoned to Watkins Elementary School.
- McNicol Middle School
- Hallandale High School

== Sister Towns ==
- Dinajpur - Bangladesh
