= List of road interchanges in the United States =

The following list contains the most notable road interchanges within the United States divided by each state, which are mainly part of the national Interstate Highway System and are all freeways intersecting with each other at a junction.

Some of the biggest ones are: Kennedy Interchange (I-64/I-65/I-71) in Louisville, Kentucky; the Marquette Interchange (I-94/I-43/I-794) and the $1.8 billion Zoo Interchange both in Milwaukee, Wisconsin; the Pregerson Interchange (I-110/I-105) in Los Angeles; and the Circle Interchange (I-90/I-94/I-290) in Chicago.

== Alabama ==
- Malfunction Junction at I-20/I-59 and I-65

== Arizona ==
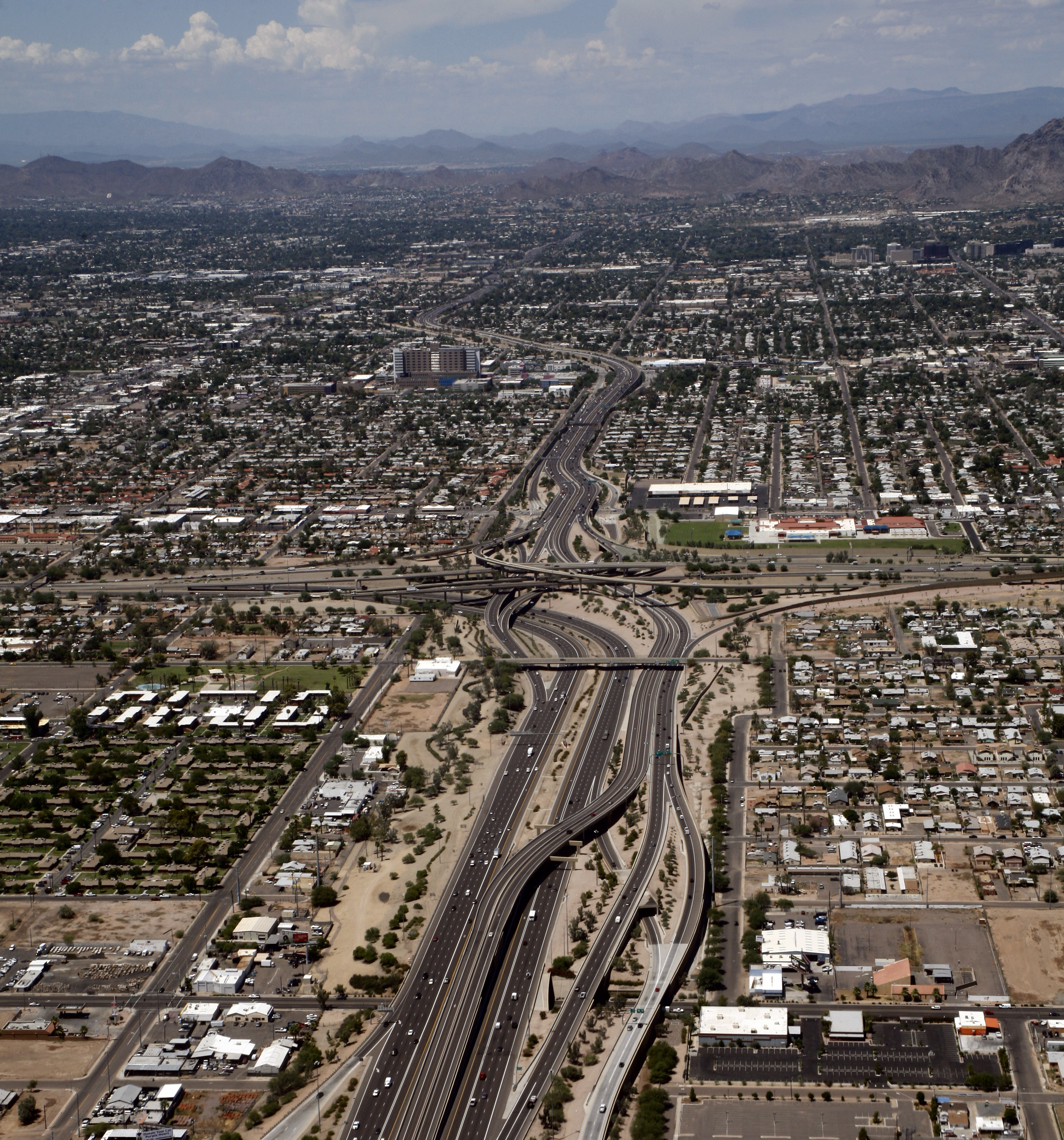
Mini Stack

- Mini Stack
- The Stack
- SuperRedTan Interchange

== Arkansas ==
- Big Rock Interchange, the junction of I-430 and I-630, Little Rock, Arkansas
- North Terminal Interchange, the junction of I-40 and I-30, Little Rock, Arkansas
- South Terminal Interchange, the junction of I-30, I-440 and I-530, Little Rock, Arkansas

== California ==
The first stack interchange in the world was the Four Level Interchange (renamed the Bill Keene Memorial Interchange), built in Los Angeles, California, and completed in 1949, at the junction of U.S. Route 101 and State Route 110. Since then, the California Department of Transportation (Caltrans) has built at least eight more four-level stacks throughout the state of California, as well as a larger number of three-level stack/cloverleaf hybrids (where the least-used left-turning ramp is built as a cloverleaf-like 270-degree loop).

Despite the construction of interchanges smoothing flow, 11 of the top 30 most congested stretches of highway in the U.S. are in Los Angeles.

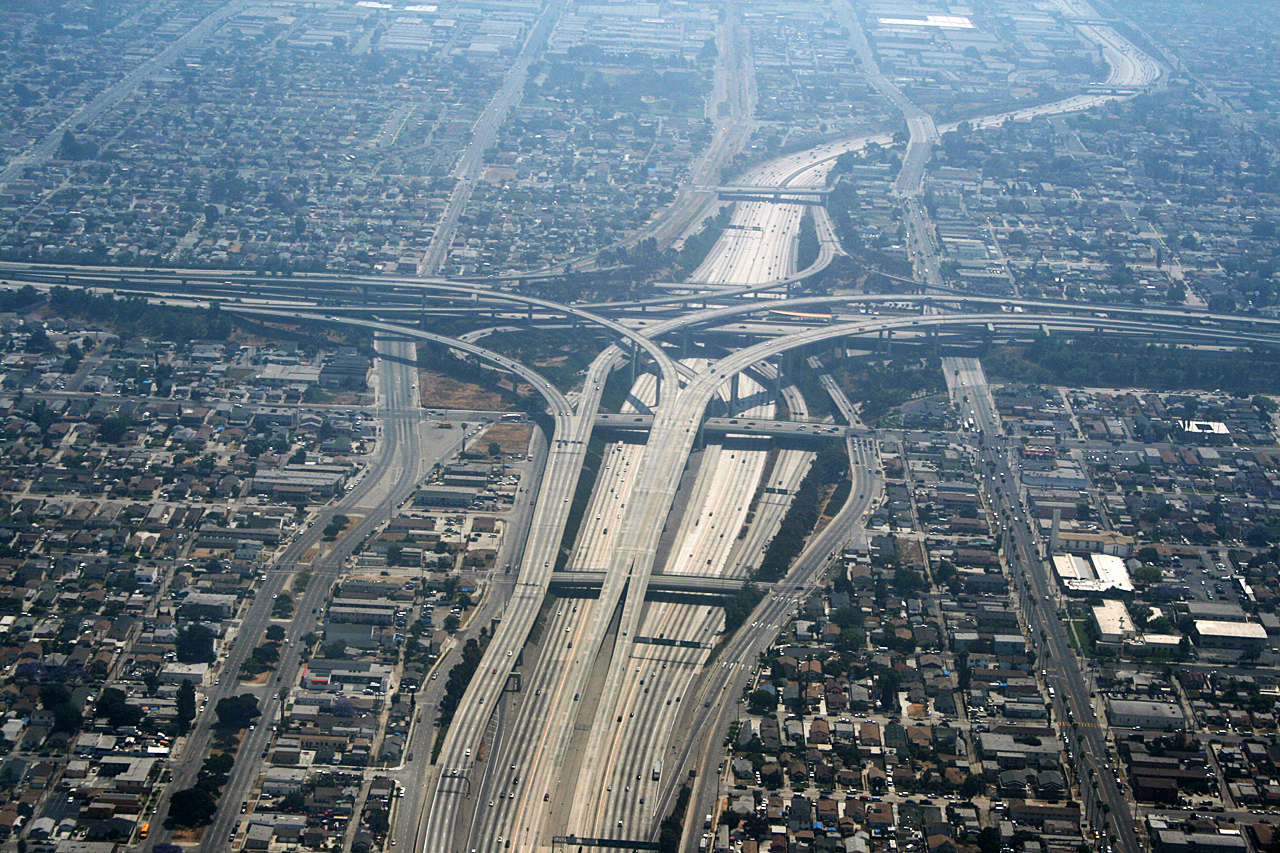
Pregerson Interchange in Los Angeles

- Alemany Maze
- Dosan Ahn Chang Ho Memorial Interchange
- East Los Angeles Interchange
- El Toro Y, at convergence of I-405 with I-5, in El Toro, California. This was thought to be one of the most congested interchanges in the world at one time.
- Four Level Interchange (1949), US 101 & SR 110
- Hollywood Split
- Joe Colla Interchange
- Judge Harry Pregerson Interchange, I-110 and I-105
- Kellogg Interchange
- MacArthur Maze
- Newhall Pass interchange
- Orange Crush interchange
- West Bakersfield Interchange
- Wheeler Ridge Interchange

== Colorado ==
- Mousetrap

== Connecticut ==
- New Haven Mixmaster (multi-level interchange between Interstate 95/Connecticut Turnpike, Interstate 91, and Route 34 in New Haven, Connecticut)
- The Stack (4-level stack interchange between Interstate 84 and Route 9 in Farmington, Connecticut)
- Waterbury Mixmaster (multi-level interchange between Interstate 84 and Route 8 in Waterbury, Connecticut)

== Florida ==
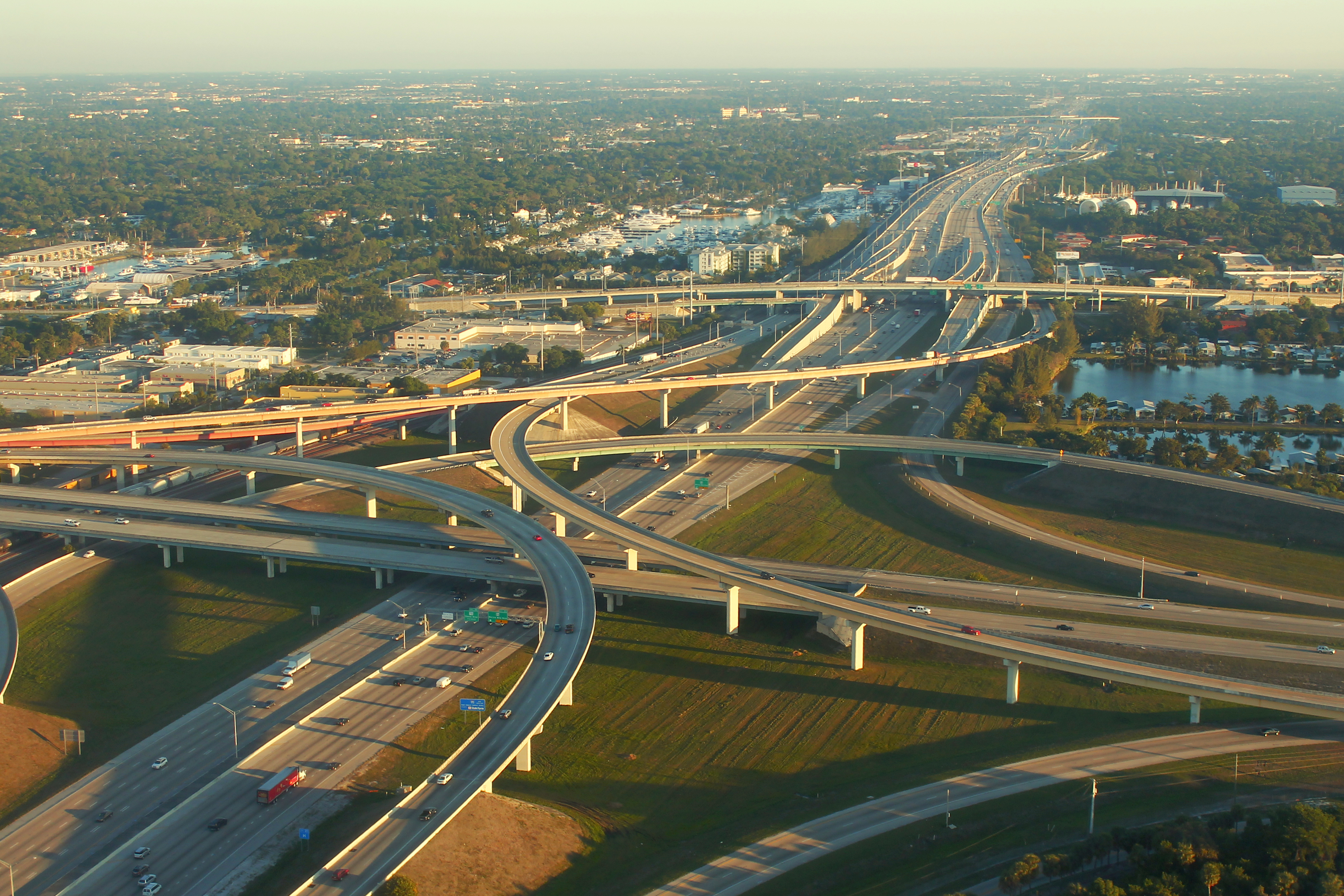
Rainbow Interchange on a morning in March 2012 or 2013

- Dolphin–Palmetto Interchange
- Golden Glades Interchange
- Midtown Interchange
- Rainbow Interchange
- Sawgrass Interchange

== Georgia ==
- Cobb Cloverleaf
- Tom Moreland Interchange (Spaghetti Junction)

== Illinois ==
- Big X
- Jane Byrne Interchange, also known as the "Circle Interchange"

== Iowa ==
- The "MixMasters" or "Mixers" in the greater Des Moines area:
  - East MixMaster: Eastern terminus of Interstate 235, and intersection of I-35 from the north and I-80 from the east
  - West MixMaster: Western terminus of Interstate 235, and intersection of I-35 to the south and I-80 to the west
- The “Systems Interchange” in Tiffin/Coralville:
  - Systems Interchange: The intersection of I-80 to the west/east and I-380 to the north/south

== Kentucky ==
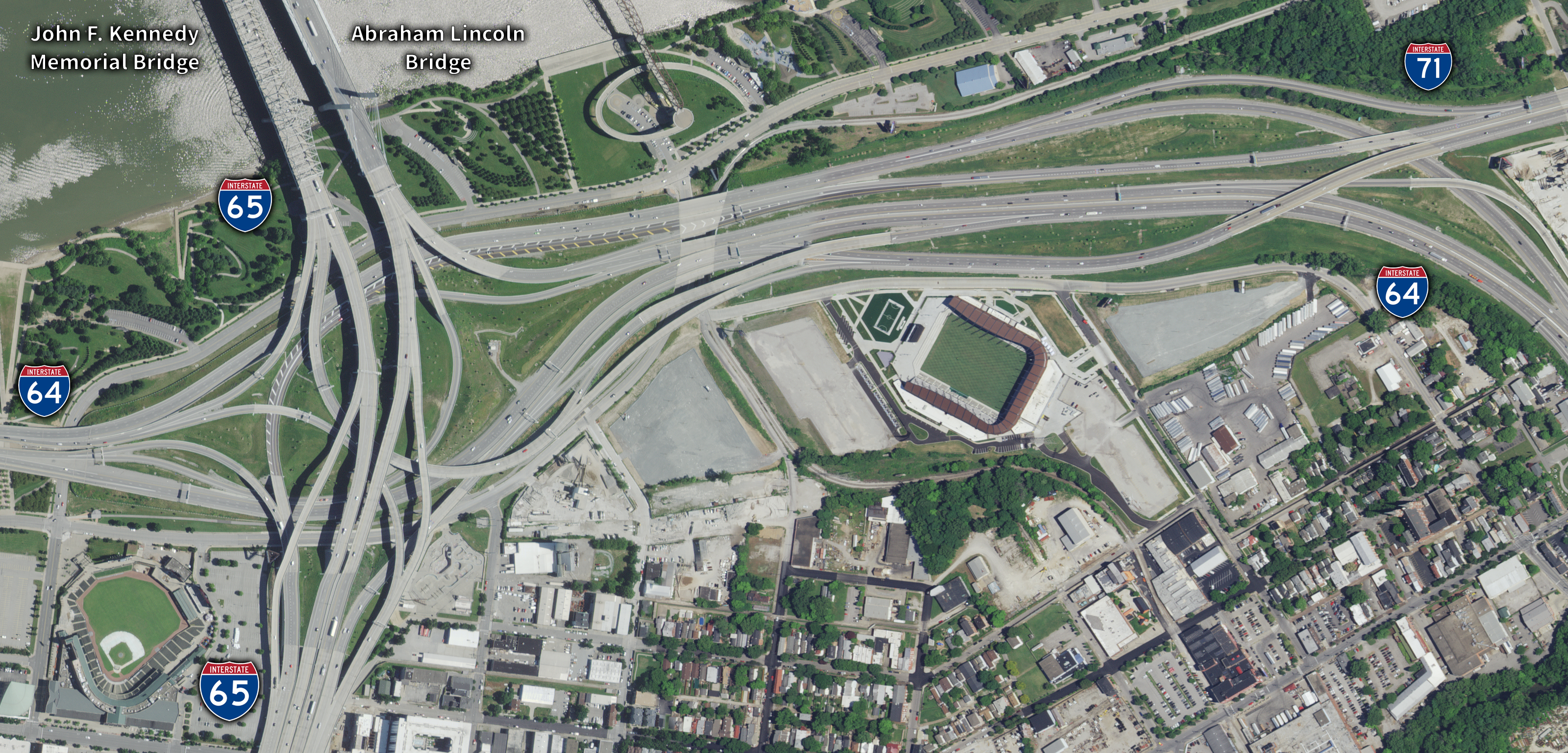
Kennedy Interchange

- Kennedy Interchange, also known as "Spaghetti Junction"

== Massachusetts ==
- Braintree Split
- Leverett Circle
- South Bay Interchange

== Michigan ==
- Ford–Lodge interchange, the first full freeway-to-freeway interchange in the United States, completed in 1955

== Minnesota ==
- Can of Worms (Minnesota interchange)

== Missouri ==
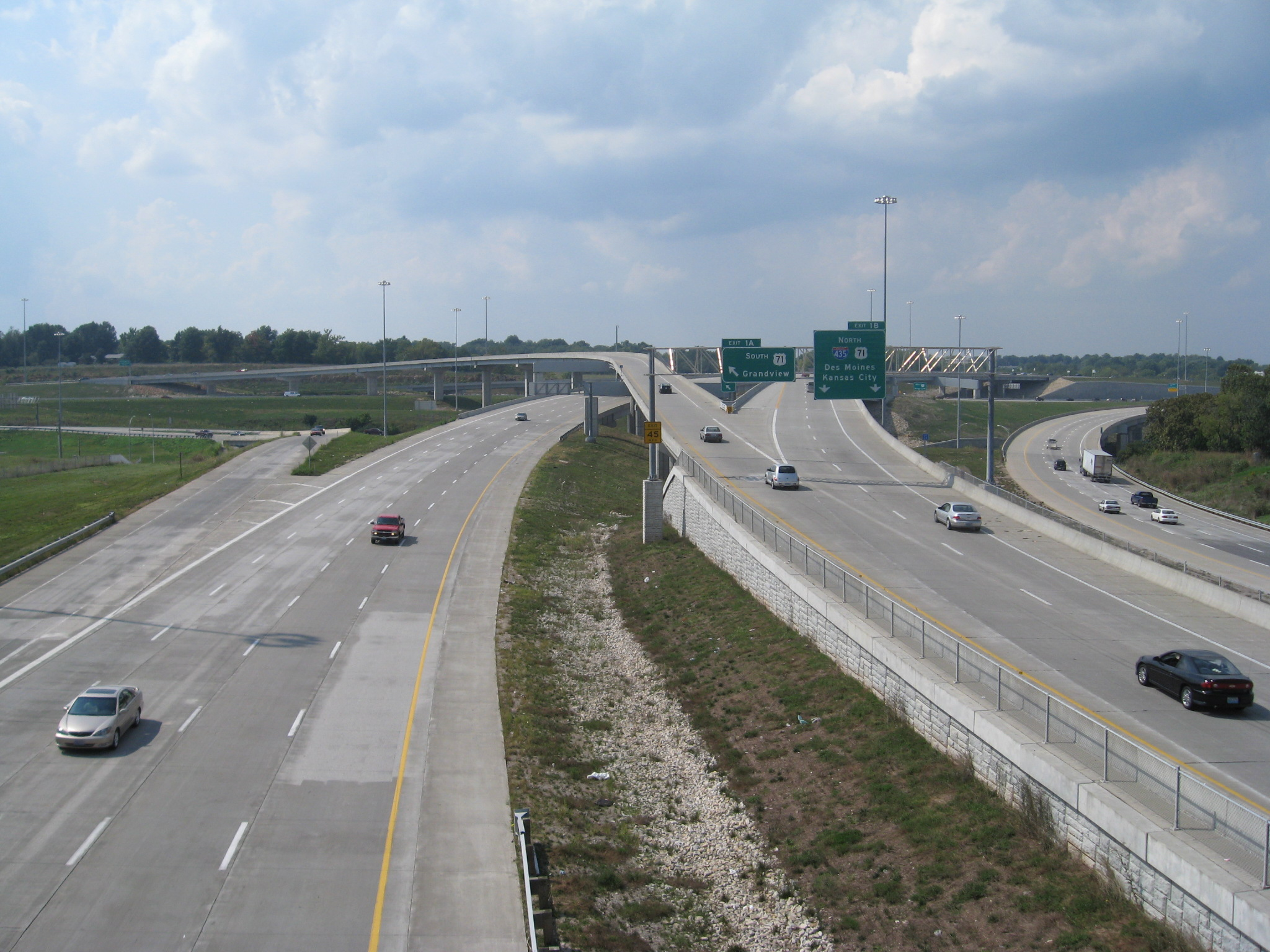
Grandview Triangle, not located in Grandview.

- Grandview Triangle. After its reconstruction it handles 250,000 cars per day (in 2016), and is believed to be capable of handling 400,000 per day.

== Nevada ==
- Centennial Bowl
- Henderson Bowl
- Spaghetti Bowl (Las Vegas)

== New Jersey ==
- Newark Airport Interchange, the junction of I-95 (New Jersey Turnpike), I-78 (Newark Bay Extension), US 1/9 (US 1 and US 9), US 22, and Route 21 at the Newark Liberty International Airport

== New Mexico ==
- Big I, in New Mexico. Its reconstruction was the largest public works project ever in New Mexico

== New York ==
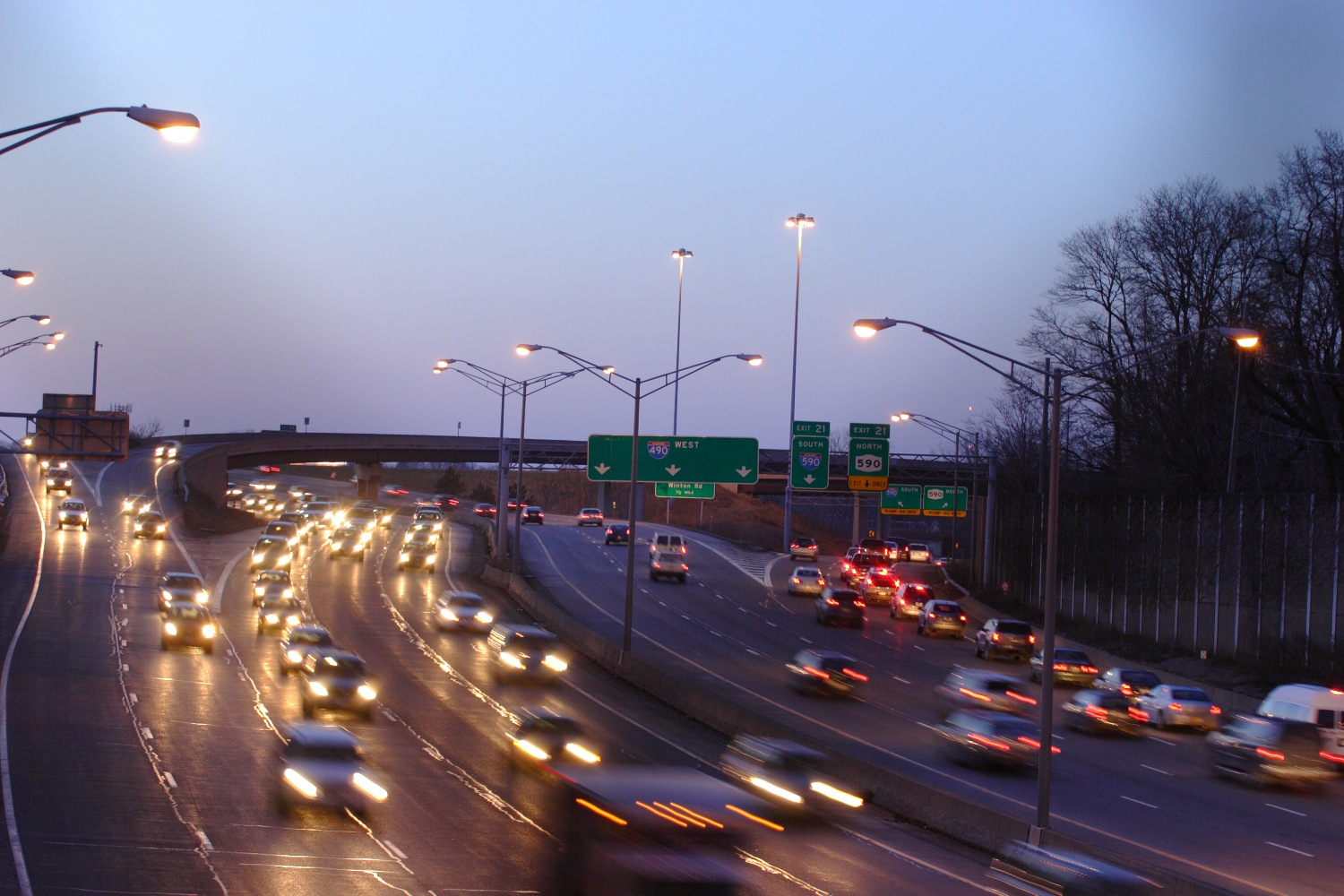
Looking westbound into the Can of Worms

- Bruckner Interchange
- Can of Worms (interchange), Rochester, New York
- Kew Gardens Interchange, Queens, New York City, serving nearly 600,000 vehicles daily.
- Westbury Interchange
- Oakdale Merge

== Ohio ==
- Andersons Junction, the junction of I-71 and I-270

== Pennsylvania ==
- Pennsylvania Turnpike/Interstate 95 Interchange
- Eisenhower Interchange
- Interstate 279 Interchange
- Mid-County Interchange
- Mount Nittany Interchange
- Throop Dunmore Interchange

== Rhode Island ==
- 6/10 Interchange
- Meshanticut Interchange

== Texas ==
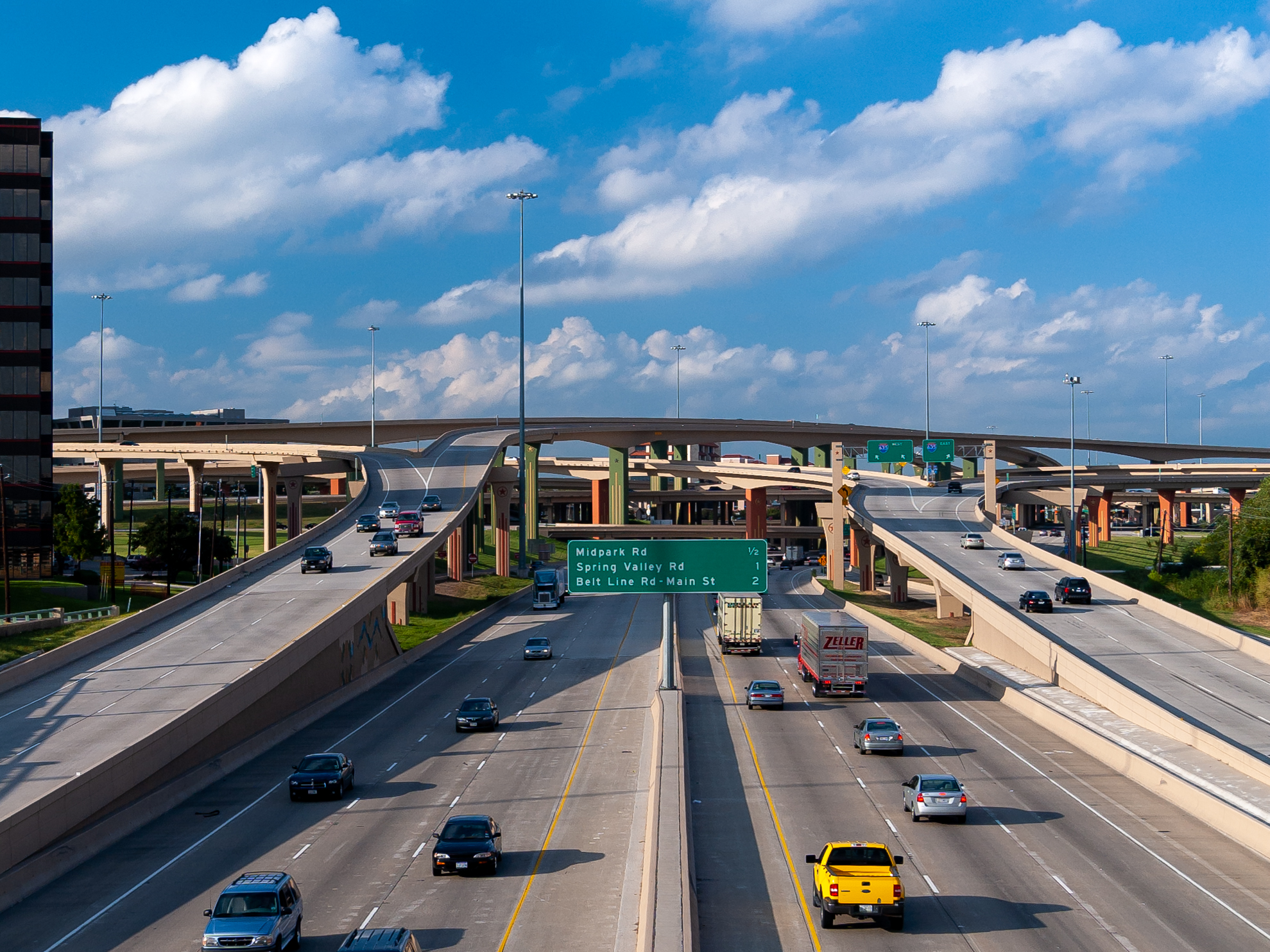
High Five, from the south, in 2007

- High Five Interchange
- Horseshoe Project
- The Y

== Virginia ==
- Bowers Hill Interchange
- Pinners Point Interchange
- Springfield Interchange

== Wisconsin ==
- Hale Interchange
- Marquette Interchange
- Mitchell Interchange
- Zoo Interchange

== See also ==
- Roundabout
- Bypass (road)
