= Florida State Road 860 =

State highway in Florida, United States

State Road 860
- Miami Gardens Drive

Route information
- Maintained by FDOT
- Length: 12.975 mi (20.881 km)
- Existed: 1926 (as Miami Gardens Road)–present

Major junctions
- West end: I-75 near Miami Gardens
- US 441 in Miami Gardens; I-95 in North Miami Beach
- East end: US 1 in Aventura

Location
- Country: United States
- State: Florida

Highway system
- Florida State Highway System; Interstate; US; State; Former; Pre‑1945; Toll; Scenic
← SR 858	→ SR 862

State Road 860 (SR 860), locally known as Miami Gardens Drive or North 183rd Street, is a 13-mile-long (21 km) east–west street serving bedroom communities in northern Miami-Dade County, Florida. Its western terminus is a diamond interchange with Interstate 75 (I-75 or SR 93) in the Palm Springs North area near Miami Lakes, passing through Carol City, Miami Gardens, and North Miami Beach before ending at an intersection with Biscayne Boulevard (U.S. Route 1 or US 1/SR 5) in Aventura.

State Road 860 is a major commuter road passing by major shopping centers and industrial parks separated by suburban communities, and often serves as an alternate to the northern (east–west) segment of the often-congested Palmetto Expressway (SR 826) and the Golden Glades Interchange to the south.

== Route description ==
A four-lane divided highway for most of its route, State Road 860 begins at a diamond interchange (formerly a trumpet interchange prior to 2018) with I-75 and a park and ride facility. The highway heads east as Miami Gardens Drive, as a central artery through a mostly residential area, serving the local commercial businesses, becoming more commercial east of a canal crossing. It has an intersection with Ludlam Road and then intersects State Road 823 (Red Road/NW 57th Avenue). East of that intersection, it enters Miami Gardens, with slightly older housing developments than west of SR 823. It then intersects State Road 847 (NW 47th Avenue) and State Road 817 (NW 27th Avenue), with SR 817, leading to Hard Rock Stadium.

East of there, SR 860 continues east through residential areas of Miami Gardens, passing under Florida's Turnpike without an interchange, and intersecting with US 441/SR 7 at the eastern end of Miami Gardens. SR 860 then enters North Miami Beach, passing through a small industrial area before intersecting with I-95, along with State Road 915. Following the intersection, Miami Gardens Drive continues east into the residential areas of Aventura, traversing in a northeastern direction at a canal crossing and continuing east through condo developments and more housing before reaching its eastern terminus at US 1/SR 5.

== History ==
Miami Gardens Drive, historically Miami Gardens Road, appears on maps for Dade County as early as 1926. State Road 860 was applied in the late 1970s to the section of Miami Gardens Drive from Red Road/West 57th Avenue – at that time, the northern terminus of SR 955, now part of SR 823 in Carol City to US 1. Unlike most Florida State Roads in Miami-Dade County, SR 860 has actually become longer since the designation, as after the completion of I-75 in 1993, the SR 860 designation was extended 3.6 miles (5.8 km) westward to connect with the Interstate highway.

== Major intersections ==
The entire route is in Miami-Dade County.

Location	mi	km	Destinations	Notes
Hialeah	0.000	0.000	I-75 (SR 93) to Florida's Turnpike Extension north – Miami, Fort Lauderdale, Orlando	Western terminus; exit 4 on I-75
Country Club	3.664	5.897	SR 823 (Northwest 57th Avenue / Red Road)	
Miami Gardens	4.686	7.541	SR 847 north (Northwest 47th Avenue)	
Miami Gardens	6.683	10.755	SR 817 (Northwest 27th Avenue / Unity Boulevard)	
Miami Gardens	9.193	14.795	US 441 (Northwest 2nd Avenue / SR 7) – Stadium	
North Miami Beach	10.19	16.40	I-95 (SR 9) – Fort Lauderdale, Airport	Exit 14 on I-95
North Miami Beach	10.248	16.493	SR 915 (Northeast 6th Avenue)	
Aventura	12.975	20.881	US 1 (Biscayne Boulevard / SR 5) – Aventura Mall	Eastern terminus
1.000 mi = 1.609 km; 1.000 km = 0.621 mi

== State Road 860F ==
State Road 860F is the hidden designation given to a series of frontage roads running north and south of SR 860 between US 441 and SR 847. These roads are known locally as Northwest 183rd Street, Northwest Sunshine State Parkway West, Northwest Miami Gardens Drive, Northwest 31st Avenue, Northwest 39th Court and Northwest 44th Avenue.
