= Airport Interchange =

Airport Interchange may refer to:

- Newark Airport Interchange, near Newark Liberty International Airport in New Jersey
- Dolphin–Palmetto Interchange, near Miami International Airport, Miami-Dade County, Florida
- 36th Street Interhcange, interchange of Interstate 95 and the Airport Expressway in Miami,
