= Interstate 595 (Florida) =

Interstate highway in Broward County, Florida

Interstate 595
- Port Everglades East-West Expressway
- I-595 highlighted in red

Route information
- Auxiliary route of I-95
- Maintained by FDOT
- Length: 12.86 mi (20.70 km)
- Existed: June 11, 1990–present
- NHS: Entire route

Major junctions
- West end: I-75 / SR 84 / SR 869 Sawgrass Interchange in Sunrise
- Florida's Turnpike in Davie; US 441 in Davie; I-95 in Fort Lauderdale
- East end: US 1 Fort Lauderdale–Hollywood International Airport/Port Everglades

Location
- Country: United States
- State: Florida
- Counties: Broward

Highway system
- Interstate Highway System; Main; Auxiliary; Suffixed; Business; Future; Florida State Highway System; Interstate; US; State; Former; Pre‑1945; Toll; Scenic
← SR 594	→ SR 595
← SR 860	SR 862	→ SR 863

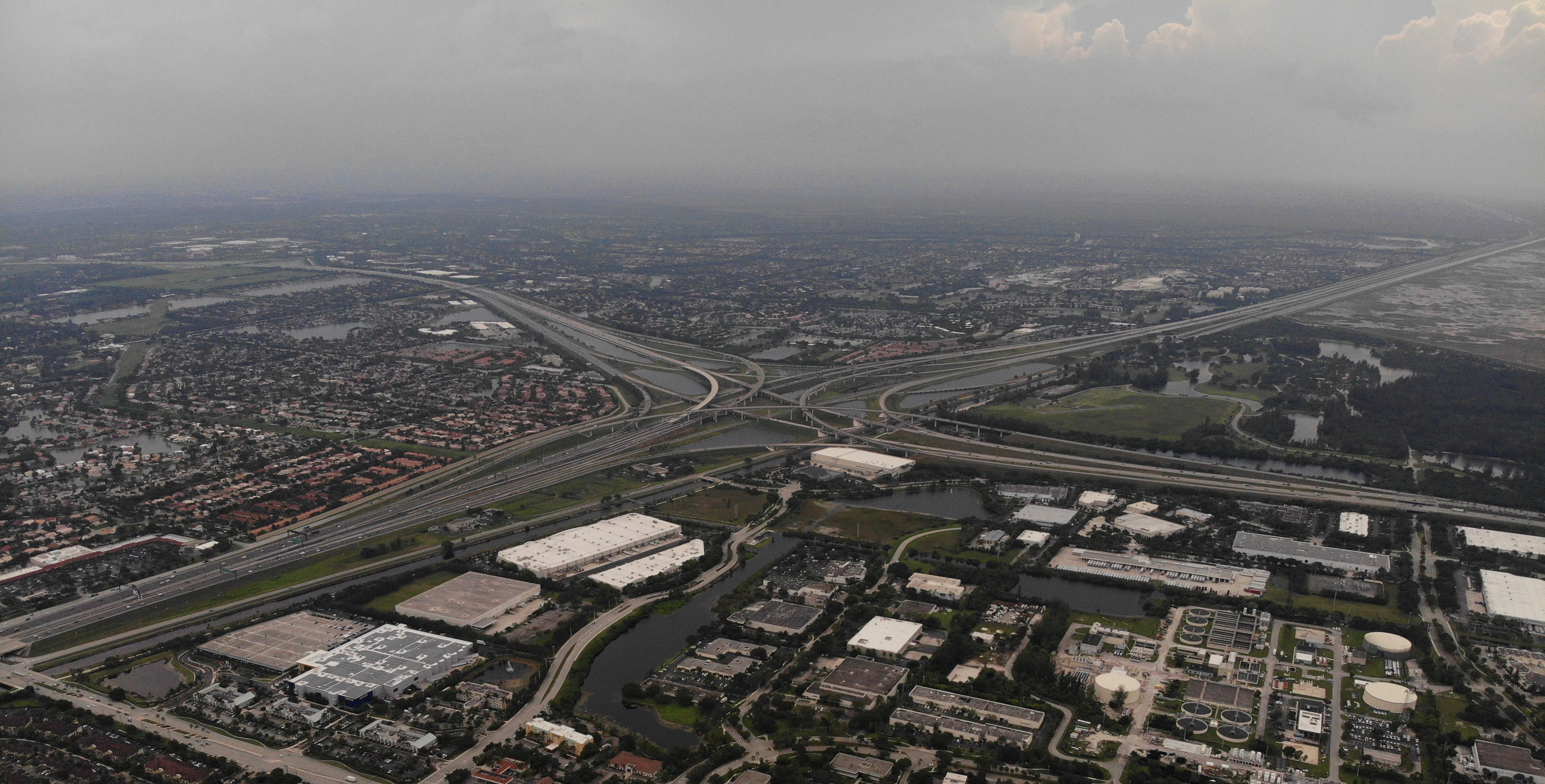
An aerial shot of the junction where I-595 and I-75 cross. Going west is Alligator Alley (I-75). Going North is Sawgrass Expressway. Going South is I-75.

Interstate 595 (I-595), also known as the Port Everglades Expressway and unsigned Florida State Road 862 (SR 862), is a 12.86-mile (20.70 km) auxiliary Interstate Highway that connects I-75 and Alligator Alley in the west with Florida's Turnpike, I-95, Fort Lauderdale–Hollywood International Airport, U.S. Highway 1 (U.S. 1), and SR A1A before terminating at Port Everglades in the east. The Interstate route was conceived in 1969 and planned as an Interstate starting in 1974. Construction began in 1984, with the expressway opening in stages in the late 1980s, and it was completed in 1991. The reversible tolled express lanes opened in 2014.

== Route description ==
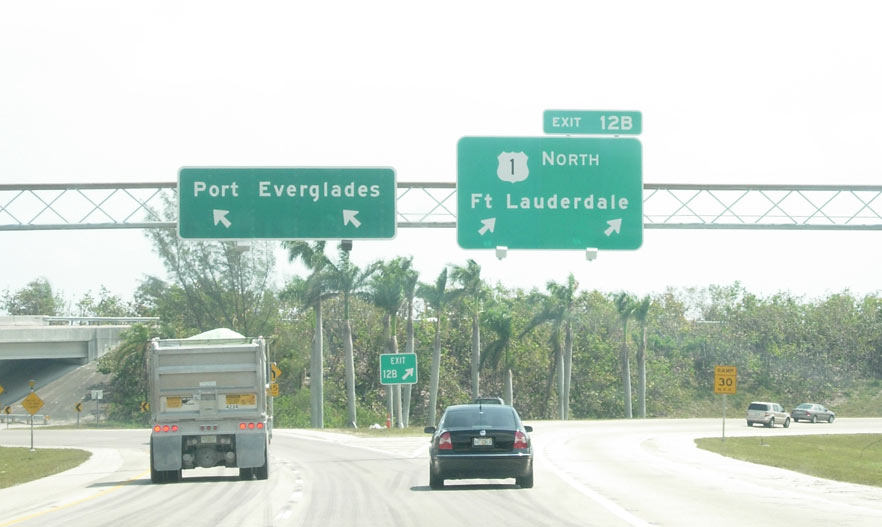
Exit 12B on I-595

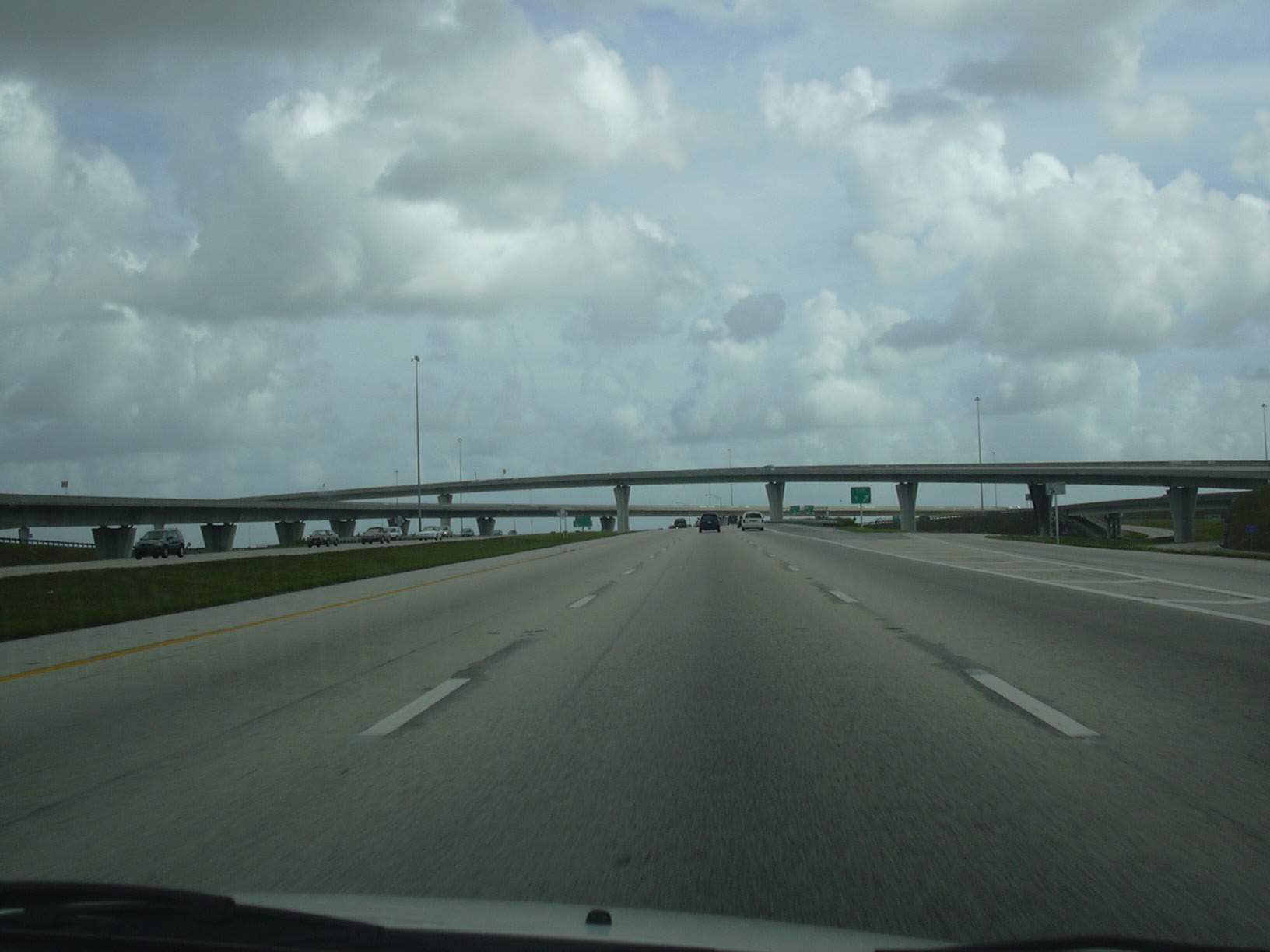
I-595 eastbound at the SR 84/US 441 interchange

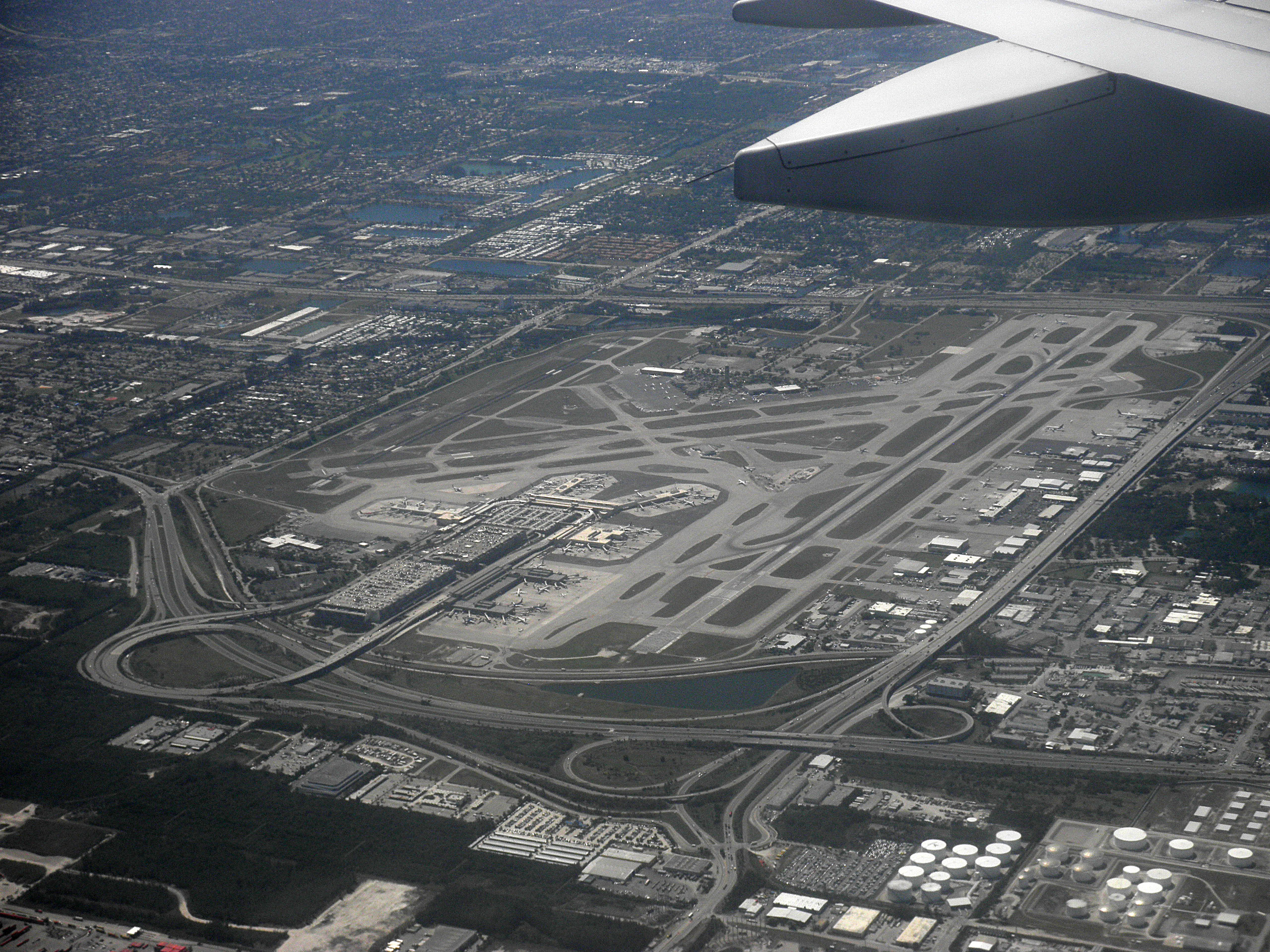
I-595 seen from the air to the right of Fort Lauderdale–Hollywood International Airport

Interstate 595 begins in Sunrise at the eastern part of the Sawgrass Interchange, with I-75 on the southern and western ends (I-75 "north" leads into Alligator Alley on the west side) and the Sawgrass Expressway (SR 869) on the northern end. From the western terminus, the highway heads east to Davie, acting as a commuter route between the western fringes of the populated part of Broward County and Fort Lauderdale. At University Drive (SR 817), I-595 goes below a partial stack interchange. Three miles east of that interchange, it meets with Florida's Turnpike and U.S. 441. The highway then continues east into Fort Lauderdale.

Continuing east into Fort Lauderdale, I-595 soon interchanges with I-95 at the Rainbow Interchange, located on the northwestern edge of Fort Lauderdale–Hollywood International Airport. From there, I-595 continues east along the northern edge of the airport. It then reaches the eastern end of the airport, where it has its final interchange with U.S. 1 (which runs concurrently with SR A1A at the interchange), providing access to both the airport and Port Everglades. The eastern terminus consists of two lanes for U.S. 1 southbound, two for U.S. 1 northbound and two lanes for Port Everglades via Eller Drive. The exit for southbound U.S. 1 has a ramp to the airport. SR A1A is not listed on the exit signs.

For most of its length, Florida State Road 84 – the former route number for Alligator Alley prior to its conversion to part of the extended Interstate 75 – runs parallel to the expressway, acting as a frontage road on either side of the Interstate.

== History ==
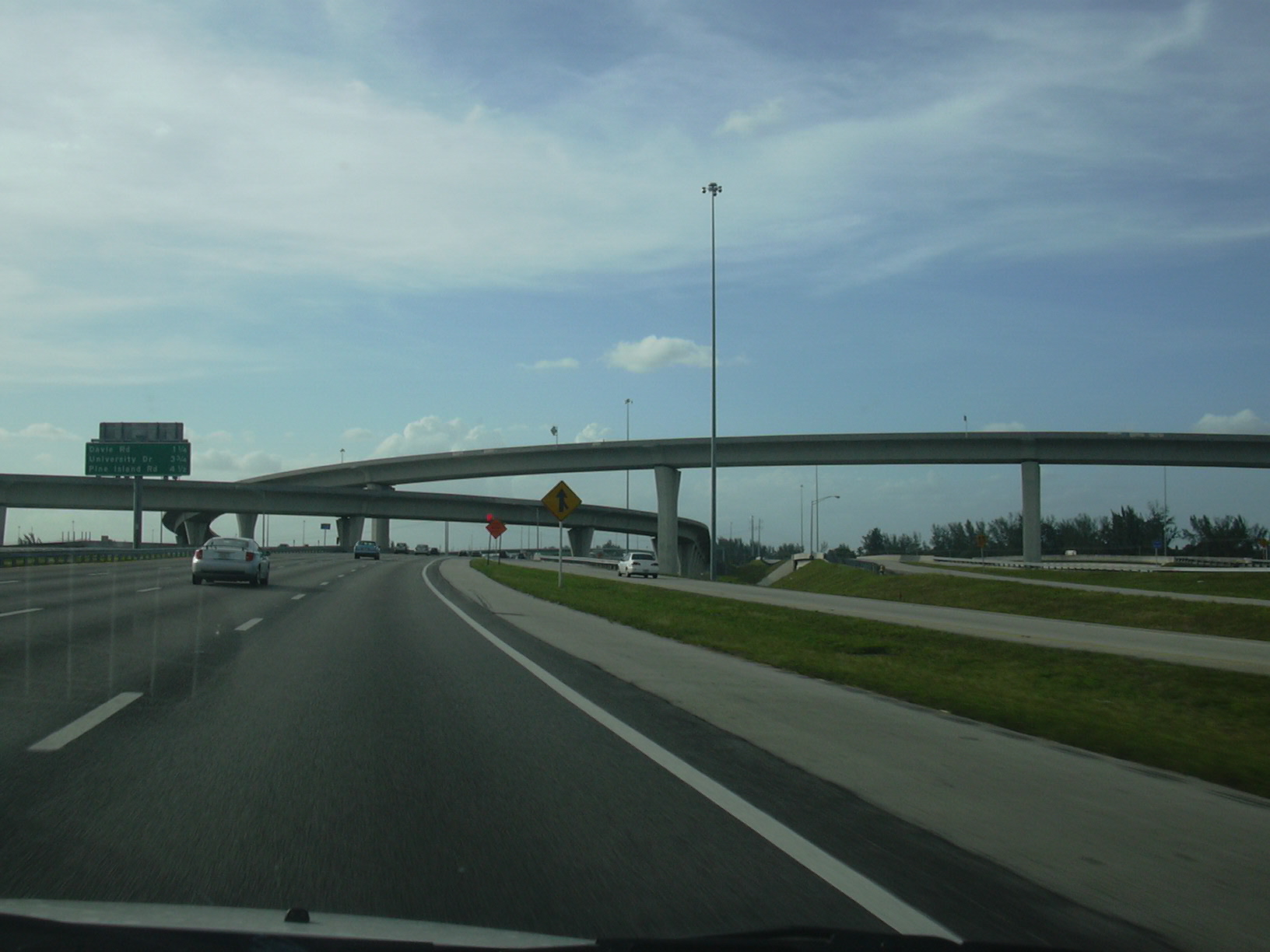
I-595 westbound at US 441 interchange

I-595 grew out of an expressway plan for connecting Port Everglades with Alligator Alley, first conceived in 1969 as the Port Expressway. In 1974, once I-75 was rerouted to Broward County on Alligator Alley as a part of its eastern connection from Naples, it was proposed to be built as an Interstate. When the southern terminus of I-75 was moved from Broward to Dade County at the Palmetto Expressway (SR 826)/Gratigny Parkway (SR 924) in the late 1970s, the construction of the trans-Broward expressway was delayed. However, in September 1978, the Federal Highway Administration (FHWA) officially added the eastern 4.2 miles (6.8 km) of the route to the Interstate Highway System, with the official designation of I-595.

In the early 1980s, I-595 was planned to be partially a toll expressway to cover its cost of construction. By the time construction started on July 26, 1984, the tolls for the expressway vanished, and it was built with only minor changes in its route. The first section, between I-75 and Hiatus Road opened in May 1988, with the section between Florida's Turnpike and US 1 opening on February 24, 1989, and the last section, connecting the disjointed sections opening on October 21, 1989. The expressway was designated as I-595 on June 11, 1990, and the Rainbow Interchange with I-95 was completed on March 22, 1991, the last unfinished interchange of the original plan.

The portion of the expressway between I-95 and US 1 follows the right-of-way of the Port Everglades railroad tracks that had previously run from the CSX Transportation railroad to Port Everglades.

In 2002, I-595, along with most of Florida's Interstates, switched over from a sequential exit numbering system to a mileage-based exit numbering system. Numbers were changed again at about the time the express lanes were opened in early 2014.

On April 9, 2022, Pittsburgh Steelers quarterback Dwayne Haskins was killed after being struck by a dump truck near Davie when he was attempting to cross the westbound lanes of I-595 at 6:40 am near Fort Lauderdale–Hollywood International Airport and died at the scene.

== Express lanes ==
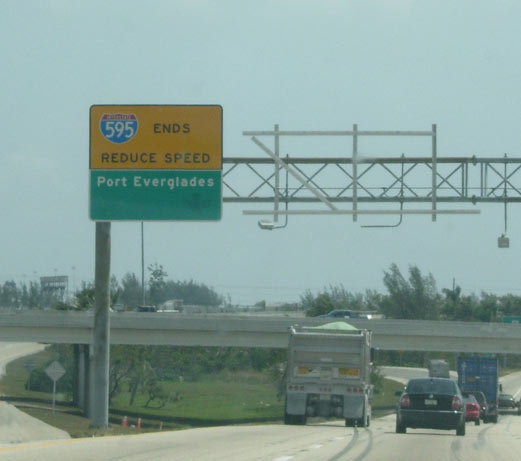
Yellow sign signaling the end of the highway

The $1.8-billion (equivalent to $2.34 billion in 2024) tolled SunPass express lanes project in the middle of the expressway to relieve the traffic congestion opened for test use on March 26, 2014, and started tolling on April 9, 2014. The express lanes will significantly improve the capacity and operations of the I-595 corridor by providing three additional at-grade lanes in the median of the corridor. The lanes will reverse direction in peak travel times (eastbound in the morning/westbound in the evening). To maximize the operational efficiency, the lanes will have tolls at varying rates throughout the day to optimize traffic flow, and access to and from the lanes will only be allowed west of 136th Avenue, east of US 441/SR 7, and through a direct connection to the median of Florida's Turnpike, removing long-distance commuter traffic from the general purpose lanes. The Florida Department of Transportation (FDOT) will retain control of the toll revenue and toll rates.

== Exit list ==
=== Mainline ===
Exits 1–7 feed into the SR 84 frontage roads. The entire route is in Broward County.

Location	mi	km	Old exit	New exit	Destinations	Notes
Sunrise–Weston– Davie tripoint	0.000	0.000	—	—	I-75 – Miami, Naples	Exit 19 on I-75 (unsigned SR 93)
Sunrise–Weston– Davie tripoint	0.000	0.000	—	—	SR 84 west / Weston Road	Westbound exit and Eastbound entrance
Sunrise–Weston– Davie tripoint	0.000	0.000	—	—	SR 869 north (Sawgrass Expressway) – Coral Springs	Southern terminus of SR 869
Sunrise–Weston– Davie tripoint	0.000	0.000	—	—	I-595 Express east	Western terminus of express lanes
Davie–Plantation line	0.569	0.916	1A	1	Southwest 136th Avenue	Westbound exit and Eastbound entrance; exit 2 Provides Full Access; Access to Sawgrass Mills
Davie–Plantation line	0.525	0.845	—	—	I-595 Express east to Florida's Turnpike / I-95 – Airport	Exit and entrance to serve SR 869
Davie–Plantation line	1.145	1.843	1B	2	SR 823 (Flamingo Road)	Westbound exit shares a ramp with exit 3; Access to Sawgrass Mills
Davie–Plantation line	2.052	3.302	2	3	Hiatus Road	
Davie–Plantation line	3.454	5.559	3	4	Nob Hill Road	Eastbound exit shares a ramp with exit 3
Davie–Plantation line	4.249	6.838	4	5	Pine Island Road	Access to West Side Regional Medical Center
Davie–Plantation line	5.504	8.858	5	6	SR 817 (University Drive)	Eastbound exit shares a ramp with exit 5; Access to Broward Mall, Nova Southeastern University, Florida Atlantic University-Davie, Broward College, McFatter Technical College, University of Florida-Fort Lauderdale, and HCA Florida University Hospital
Davie–Plantation line	6.092	9.804	7	7	Davie Road	Access to Nova Southeastern University, Broward College, McFatter Technical College, Florida Atlantic University-Davie, and University of Florida-Fort Lauderdale
Davie–Plantation line	6.970	11.217	8A	8	SR 84 west	Westbound exit and Eastbound entrance
Davie–Plantation line	7.336	11.806	8A	8	Florida's Turnpike – Orlando, Miami	Exits 54-54X on Florida's Turnpike (unsigned SR 91)
Davie–Plantation line	8.080	13.003	—	—	I-595 Express west to I-75 / SR 869	Eastern terminus of express lanes
Davie–Fort Lauderdale– Broadview Park tripoint	8.409	13.533	8B	9A-B	US 441 (SR 7)	Shared ramp with exit 8 eastbound; signed as exits 9A (north) and 9B (south)
Davie–Fort Lauderdale– Broadview Park tripoint	8.329	13.404	9; 10	9C	SR 84 east (Marina Mile Boulevard)	Eastbound exit and westbound entrance
Fort Lauderdale–Hollywood– Dania Beach tripoint	10.373	16.694	11	10	I-95 – Fort Lauderdale, West Palm Beach, Miami	Rainbow Interchange; signed as exits 10A (north) and 10B (south); exits 24-26 on I-95 (unsigned SR 9)
Fort Lauderdale–Hollywood– Dania Beach tripoint	10.373	16.694	–	–	I-95 Express – Fort Lauderdale, West Palm Beach, Miami	Eastbound exit and westbound entrance; direct connection from 595 Express to I-95 Express as part of Phase 3C
Fort Lauderdale–Hollywood– Dania Beach tripoint	12.544	20.188	12A-B	12A	US 1 south – Dania Beach, International Airport	Eastbound exit and westbound entrance; formerly exits 12A (US 1) and 12B (Airport); unsigned SR 5
Fort Lauderdale–Hollywood– Dania Beach tripoint	12.544	20.188	12C	12B	US 1 north – Fort Lauderdale	Eastbound exit and westbound entrance; unsigned SR 5
Fort Lauderdale–Hollywood– Dania Beach tripoint	12.544	20.188	—	12C	Northeast 7th Avenue – International Airport	Eastbound exit and westbound entrance
Fort Lauderdale–Hollywood– Dania Beach tripoint	12.860	20.696	—	—	McIntosh Road / Eller Drive – Port Everglades	At-grade intersection
1.000 mi = 1.609 km; 1.000 km = 0.621 mi: Electronic toll collection; Incomplete access; Tolled

=== Express lanes ===
The entire route is in Broward County.

Location	mi	km	Exit	Destinations	Notes
Sunrise–Weston– Davie tripoint	0.000	0.000	–	I-75 Express south / – Miami	Express Lanes continue on I-75 southbound
Sunrise–Weston– Davie tripoint	0.000	0.000	–	I-75 – Miami, Naples	Exit 19 on I-75 (SR 93); Access to Local Lanes southbound
Davie–Plantation line	1.413	2.274	–	I-595 west (SR 862) to SR 869 (Sawgrass Expressway) – Coral Springs	Westbound exit and eastbound entrance (peak-direction only)
Davie–Plantation line	1.869	3.008	Sunpass toll gantry ($0.50–$2.00 dynamic pricing)		
Davie–Plantation line	7.762	12.492	8	Florida's Turnpike – Miami, Orlando	Eastbound exit and westbound entrance; exit 54X on Florida's Turnpike (unsigned SR 91)
Davie–Plantation line			–	I-595 east – Airport	Roadway merges with I-595 mainline
1.000 mi = 1.609 km; 1.000 km = 0.621 mi: Electronic toll collection; Incomplete access; Route transition

== See also ==
- Dwayne Haskins - a football player that died on this route on April 9, 2022
