= Rainbow Interchange =

- Lauderloop
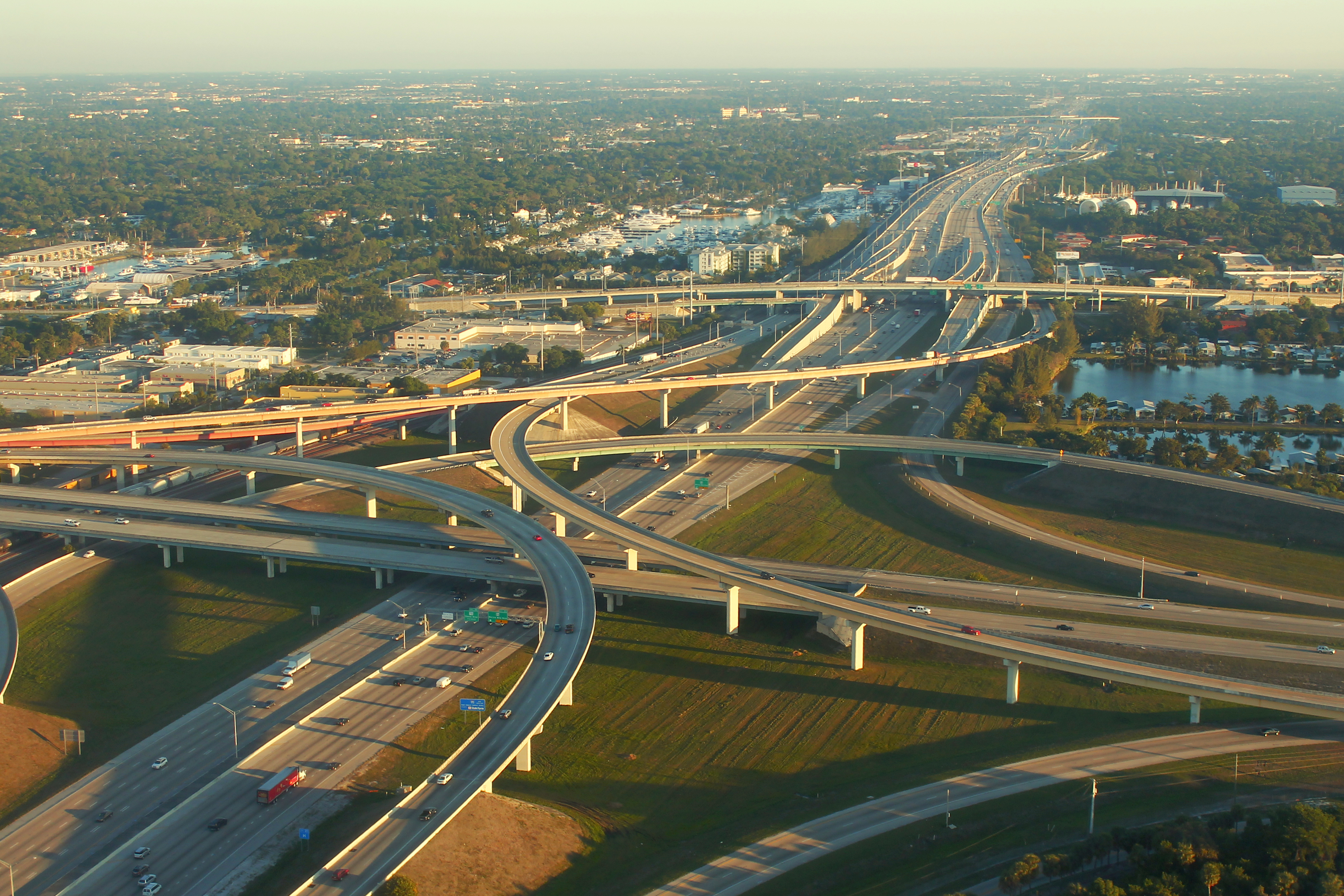
- Rainbow Interchange during the morning commute.
- Interactive map of Rainbow Interchange

Location
- Fort Lauderdale, Florida
- Coordinates: 26.08196°N 80.168722°W
- Roads at junction: I-95; I-595

Construction
- Type: Stack interchange
- Opened: March 22, 1991
- Maintained by: Florida Department of Transportation

The Rainbow Interchange is a four–level stack interchange located in Fort Lauderdale, Florida near the Fort Lauderdale-Hollywood International Airport. The interchange connects two major highways in the area, I-95 (leading to Miami and West Palm Beach) and I-595 (leading to Davie and the airport). The interchange opened in 1991.

While minor construction improvements and repainting have occurred since the opening of the interchange, the interchange is experiencing major additions throughout 2025 as part of the Florida Department of Transportation's 95 Express project that, as of February 2025, has eliminated the colorful paint scheme it's named after.

== History ==
The Rainbow Interchange opened to traffic on March 22, 1991. The cost of constructing the interchange was $121 million (equivalent to $247.7 million in 2024). Jim Weinberg designed the color scheme for the overpasses. He used Art Deco-stylized shades of color for the overpasses: winter blue, mural pink, cockleshell, natural grain, sailor's sky, and hazy sun.

In 1990, while the interchange was still under construction, the Miami Herald ran a contest in which its readers were requested to submit names for the soon-to-be important connection between two Interstate highways. The winning name was the Lauderloop, an ironic choice as four-level stack interchanges do not incorporate loops in their design. The contest was a short-term joke as virtually nobody in the local media referred to "Lauderloop" in their articles and reports involving the interchange, choosing the Rainbow moniker instead.

In 2002, the Florida Department of Transportation decided to repaint the interchange in bold colors.

As of 2022, due to Phase 3 of the I-95 Express Lanes extension, the interchange is being expanded with more overpasses and flyover ramps. The existing overpasses and flyover ramps are being kept, but the girders are being repainted royal blue. The repainting of the existing girders to just one consistent color may require the interchange to be given a new name. These ramps include ramps connecting the northbound and southbound express lanes on I-95 to both directions of I-595. As of February 2025, the colorful paint scheme for which the interchange is named after has been fully eliminated.

== Description ==
The Rainbow Interchange marks the southern end of a segment of I-95 that saw traffic levels of roughly 328,000 automobiles per day in 2013. Interstate 595 carries roughly half that load in its eight lanes just west of the junction of two Interstate highways.

== See also ==
- Transportation in South Florida
- Sawgrass Interchange
- Golden Glades Interchange
- Midtown Interchange
- Dolphin–Palmetto Interchange
