= Sawgrass Interchange =

Highway interchange in Sunrise, Florida, United States

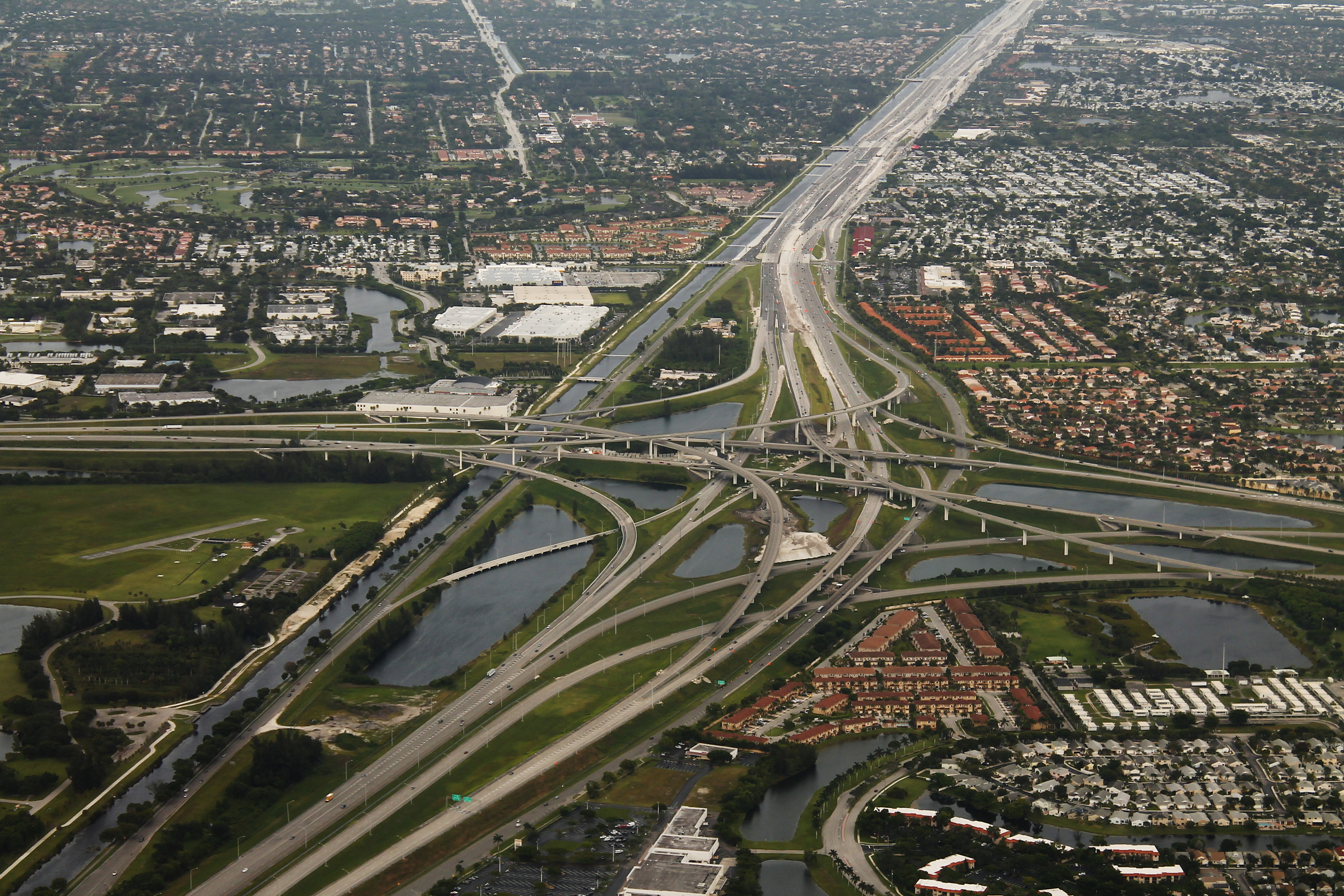
- The Sawgrass Interchange, looking east
- Interactive map of Sawgrass Interchange

Location
- Sunrise, Florida
- Coordinates: 26.119889°N 80.345959°W
- Roads at junction: I-75; I-595; SR 869; SR 84

Construction
- Type: Stack interchange
- Spans: 70
- Constructed: 1986–1989
- Opened: 1989
- Maintained by: FDOT

The Sawgrass Interchange is a large highway interchange in Sunrise, Florida, United States.

== History ==
The Sawgrass Interchange was built between 1986 and 1989. The interchange opened in late 1989. The interchange was constructed at a cost of $52 million (1989 USD). At the time of its opening, the interchange was the largest in Florida.

In 2023, there was widespread concern when a social media post, which erroneously claimed that one of the interchange's bridges was structurally unsound because of a visible gap, went viral. The Florida Department of Transportation (FDOT) inspected the bridge and found no structural defects; the "gap" was normal and intentionally constructed when the bridge was built in the 1980s, being the location of one of the bridge's expansion joints.

== Description ==
The Sawgrass Interchange is a five-level stack interchange. It serves as the junction point for three major expressways in South Florida: Interstate 75 (I-75), I-595 (the Port Everglades Expressway), and State Road 869 (SR 869, Sawgrass Expressway). SR 84 also travels through the interchange.

The interchange includes the respective western and southern terminuses of I-595 and SR 869 (both of which merge into I-75), as well as the eastern terminus of Alligator Alley.

=== Design ===
The Sawgrass Interchange consists of several bridges and 70 bridge spans—all of which are made of precast segmental concrete; the bridge spans range from 120 to 200 feet (37 to 61 m) and were constructed with 1,366 precast box girder segments. The stack interchange occupies an area of approximately 550 acres (220 ha). The interchange also reaches 90 to 92 feet (27 to 28 m).

== See also ==
- Transportation in South Florida
- Rainbow Interchange
- Golden Glades Interchange
- Midtown Interchange
- Dolphin-Palmetto Interchange
