= Midtown Interchange =

Road junction in Miami, Florida, USA

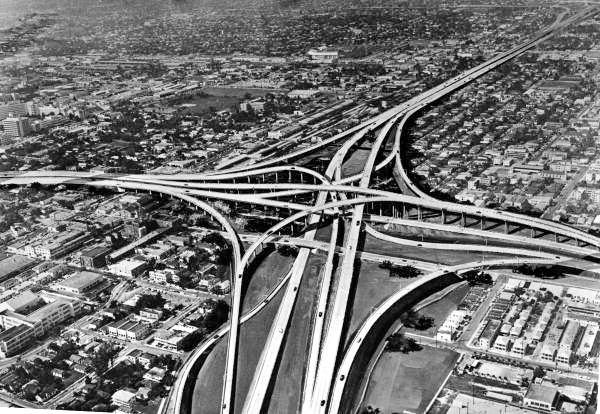
- The Midtown Interchange, c. mid-1960s
- Interactive map of Midtown Interchange

Location
- Miami, Florida
- Coordinates: 25.7888020°N 80.2039363°W
- Roads at junction: I-95 I-395 SR 836

Construction
- Type: Stack interchange
- Maintained by: Florida Department of Transportation (FDOT); Miami-Dade Expressway Authority (MDX)

The Midtown Interchange, located in the Civic Center and Overtown neighborhoods of Miami, Florida, is the convergence of three major motorways: I-95, I-395 (which connects to the MacArthur Causeway to the east), and the Dolphin Expressway (SR 836).

== Description ==
Since its opening in 1968, eight lanes have been added to I-95 and an undersea tunnel below Biscayne Bay has been added from the end of I-395 near Museum Park. The tunnel serves as a direct freeway connection to the PortMiami, expected to alleviate freight traffic in Downtown Miami.

As of 2025, most of the interchange is being rebuilt as part of the Signature Bridge project for I-395 just east of the interchange that also includes double decking the eastern end of the Dolphin Expressway. The near one billion dollar project is not expected to be completed until the late 2020s.

== See also ==
- Transportation in South Florida
- Dolphin–Palmetto Interchange
- Golden Glades Interchange
- Rainbow Interchange
- Sawgrass Interchange
