= I-395 Signature Bridge =

Ongoing construction project

I-395 Signature Overpass
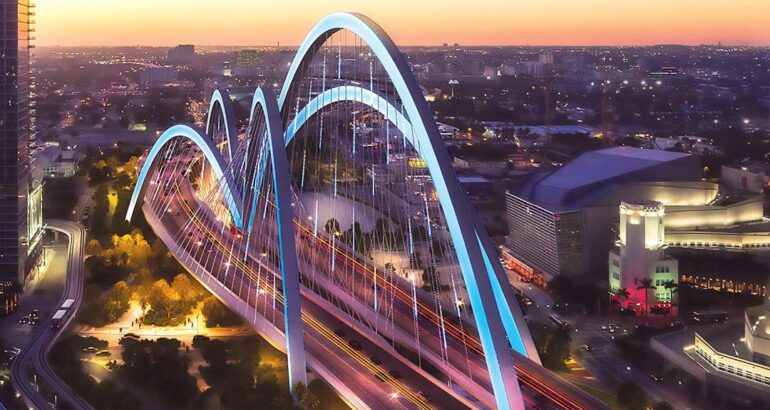
- A rendering of the final design
- Coordinates: 25°47′09″N 80°11′21″W
- Locale: Miami, Florida

Characteristics
- Design: Donald MacDonald Architects
- Total length: 1,025 ft (312 m)
- Longest span: 650 ft (198 m)

History
- Construction start: 2016
- Construction end: 2029 (planned)

Location
- Interactive map of I-395 Signature Overpass

The Interstate-395 Signature Overpass (also referred to as The Fountain) is an ongoing construction project on the I-395/SR-836/I-95 Midtown Interchange in downtown Miami, Florida. The overpass was designed by Donald MacDonald architects, led by the Archer-Western-de Moya Group. The Florida Department of Transportation (FDOT) and Miami-Dade Expressway Authority are the current overseers of the project. The overpass spans 1025 feet (312 meters), with a maximum arch height reaching 325 feet (99 meters) and maximum span length reaching 650 feet (198 meters). The construction project began in 2016 and was intended to be completed in 2021, but setbacks moved the expected completion date to 2024, then 2027, then further to 2029. The Fountain aspect of the overpass intends to stand as a landmark for passersby visible from the Port of Miami, while the overpass additionally serves as an emergency evacuation route from Miami Beach. The wider project, known as Connecting Miami, also includes double decking a portion of the Dolphin Expressway (SR 836) west of the Midtown Interchange.

== Project concept ==
The I-395 Signature Bridge project was created with the intention of displaying the greater city of Miami as a center of the arts, standing alongside nearby art hubs such as the Adrienne Arsht Center for the Performing Arts and the Perez Art Museum. The name "The Fountain" was coined to tie the bridge's water-like expression to Miami's connection to water. The fountain-like appearance of the bridge will also include LED luminaries that will create a lighting effect across the arches. The bridge is one part of the greater highway interchange project taking place on I-395 and nearby highways. New lanes are being added to I-395-MacArthur Causeway interchange, and modifications will be made to the exits toward NE and NW 2nd Avenues. On the I-95 interchange, roads will be repaved and new ramps to SR-836 and I-95 will facilitate traffic flow.

In addition to the Bridge, the project will form an urban park with the 55-acre plot beneath the highway interchange. The role of bridges in urban environments often serves to resemble the culture and history of the city it inhabits, influencing city identity and public opinion. In accordance, under the bridge, the proposed Heritage Walk will honor Miami's history, with references to the Tequesta Indians, Julia Tuttle, Henry Flagler, the African American settlers of Overtown, Cuban immigrants, and more. These founders and figures of Miami will be part of the new landmark in a combination with a recreational space intended to provide nature and promote sustainability in the otherwise urban area. The clearance over the boulevard is about 27 feet (8 meters).

== Construction progress ==
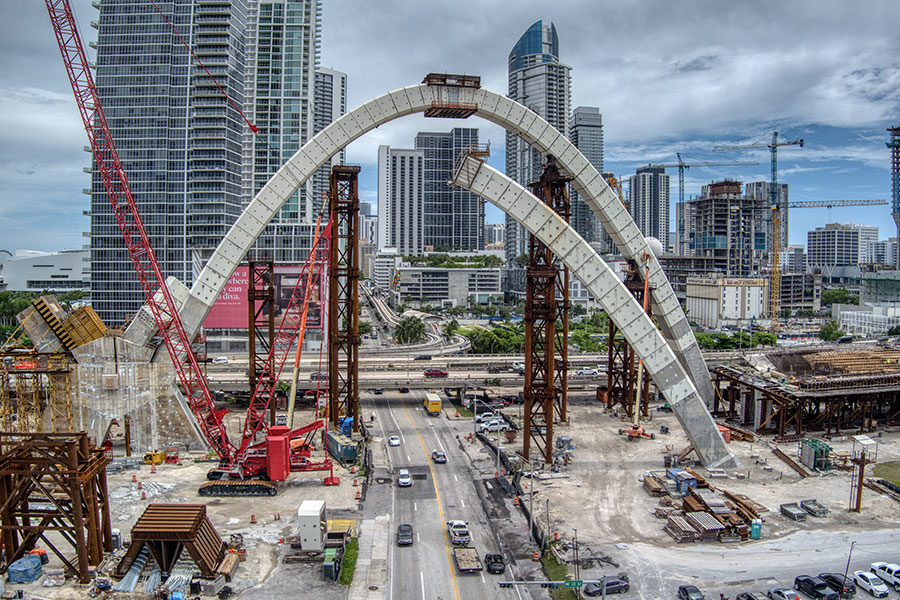
Photo from July 2024 showing the construction of the arches of the Signature Bridge, giving it its fountain-like appearance

As of April 2025, notable progress has been made on the completion of the bridge. The previous I-395 bridge part of the interchange has been demolished and the installation of foundations and piers for the new bridge has begun. Crews have completed one of the six arches over Northeast Second Avenue and have nearly finished erecting all 41 precast, 90-ton arch segments for a second arch. Plans for the urban park beneath I-395, which will be known as the "Underdeck," have received a $60.3 million grant from the City of Miami to fund amenities such as interactive water features, an amphitheater, and urban gardens.

=== Delays and budget changes ===
Despite the progress, construction of the bridge has faced a number of setbacks, which initially brought the projected completion date from 2024 to 2027 and the total cost from $800 million to $840 million. Due to the COVID-19 pandemic, the construction efforts faced a variety of supply chain issues which led to the delay of delivery of essential materials such as steel and concrete. Labor shortages and health and safety protocols related to the pandemic additionally slowed the construction timeline. Existing in the waterside, tropical climate of Miami, the bridge construction has also faced severe weather which has further prolonged the project. The rise in the projected total cost is attributed to a variety of factors. In addition to materials cost escalation, design changes in parts of the project, such as the Underdeck, and additional expenses for maintaining the construction site and traffic protocols over the extended period of time have all contributed to the elevated cost.

In mid-2025, the projected completion date was further pushed to 2029 and the total cost hiked from $840 million to $866 million. The Miami New Times noted that the FDOT "quietly" updated the completion date and cost mentioned on the project's website without public announcement. As of July 23, 2025, the newspaper awaits official comment from the FDOT concerning the new delay. Transit Alliance Miami executive director Cathy Dos Santos commented negatively on this delay, saying that it has now "bloated into a decade-long $840 million bottleneck."

=== Traffic concerns ===
The extended construction process of the I-395 Signature Bridge has impacted the transportation and overall livelihood of the downtown Miami area. The closure of lanes on I-395 and nearby roads has led to traffic detours affecting day-to-day commute. The closed lanes have increased traffic congestion, especially during peak commute hours in the morning and afternoon. The I-395 Signature Bridge upon completion intends to form wider lanes and more accessible highway interchanges which will overall reduce traffic in comparison to before the project's commencement.

In order to minimize disruptions during construction, the FDOT has implemented a variety of traffic management measures, which include the adjustment of traffic signaling, the creation of additional lanes in certain areas to compensate for those lost, and providing real-time traffic updates to assist drivers in navigating construction zones.
