= Dolphin–Palmetto Interchange =

Coordinates: 25.781044°N 80.320885°W

- 826-836 Interchange
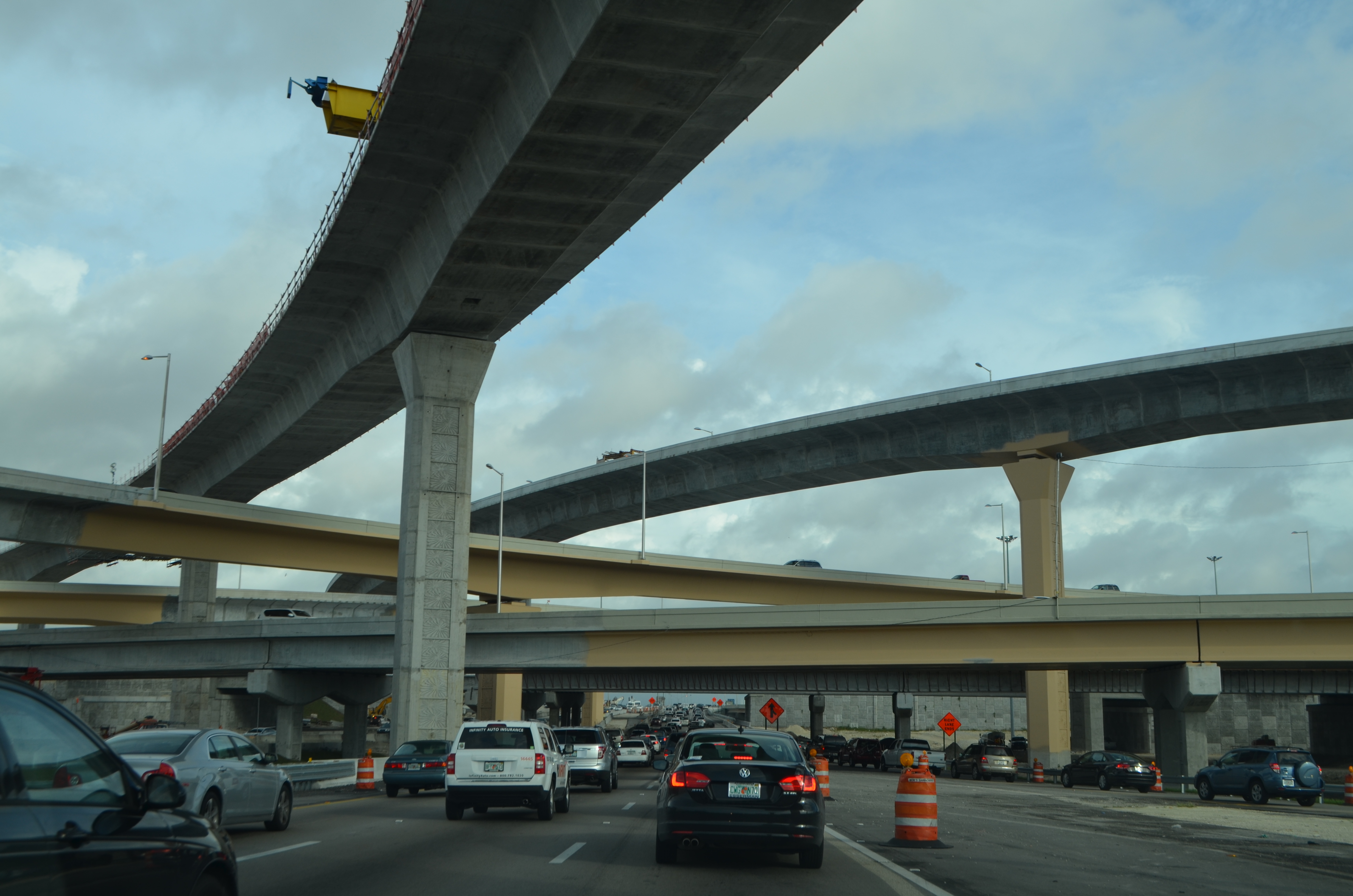
- Construction on the interchange in November 2014 from SR 826 northbound
- Interactive map of Dolphin–Palmetto Interchange

Location
- Miami-Dade County, Florida
- Roads at junction: US 41; SR 826; SR 836; SR 968; SR 969; SR 973

Construction
- Type: Stack interchange
- Lanes: 2 (flyovers) to 14 (Palmetto Expressway)
- Constructed: Reconstructed 2012–2016
- Maximum height: Sea level to 100 feet (30 m) AMSL (highest flyovers)
- Maintained by: FDOT

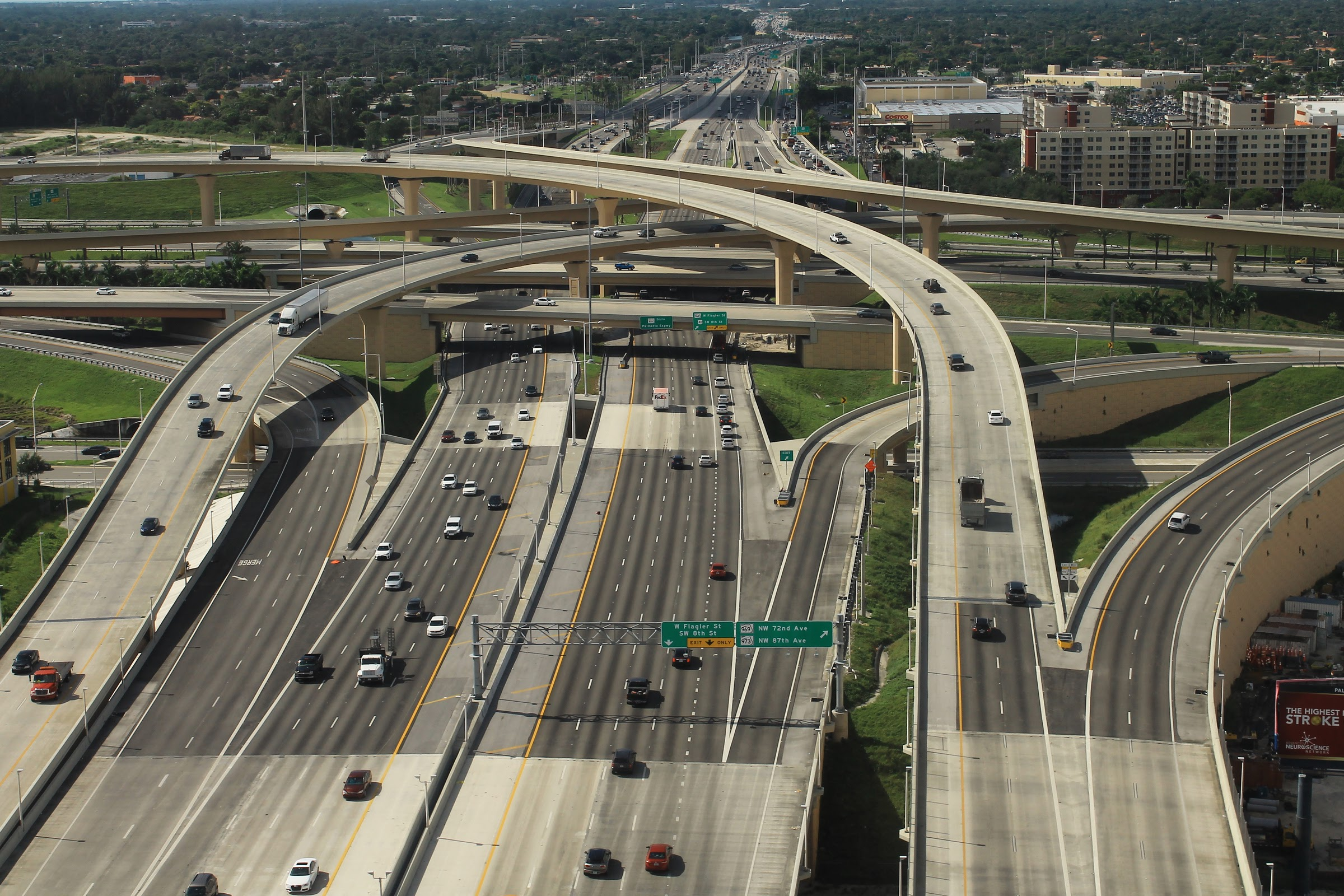
Highway interchange between Dolphin Expressway and Palmetto Expressway in Greater Miami, Florida, United States

The Dolphin–Palmetto Interchange, also known as 826–836, is a complex four-level stack interchange in Miami-Dade County, Florida, United States. It primarily serves as a highway interchange between State Road 826 (SR 826, Palmetto Expressway) and SR 836 (Dolphin Expressway), but also has ramps to surface streets such as SR 968 (Flagler Street) and SR 969 (Milam Dairy Road).

== History ==
The reconstruction project was completed in phases from 2012 to 2015-2016, at a cost of about $560 million, with related construction beginning in 2009, replacing the old two-level clover-directional interchange. The interchange was considered well beyond safe capacity, serving over 400,000 vehicles per day.

The reconstruction was the final phase in a 12-step program to improve the highly trafficked Palmetto Expressway, though in 2014 a new project to add express lanes to the Palmetto Expressway was proposed, to begin construction in 2016. Much work also remains for the Dolphin Expressway. Work took place with phased detours, closures, and openings. All roads involved were kept open throughout construction. Much of the new interchange opened in October 2015, including the two highest flyovers, with completion at that point scheduled for March 2016. By summer 2016, the interchange was objectively complete. The official announcement came in early October, very near budget ($563 million) but a couple years over time. The project included moving a drainage canal and construction of 45 individual bridges, with the interchange serving 430,000 vehicles daily.

The main four levels of the interchange are the Palmetto at ground level under the Dolphin Expressway, the Dolphin-to-Palmetto left-hand flyovers on the third level, then the Palmetto-to-Dolphin left-hand flyovers on top fourth level.

== See also ==
- Transportation in South Florida
- Midtown Interchange
- Golden Glades Interchange
- Rainbow Interchange
- Sawgrass Interchange
