= Golden Glades Interchange =

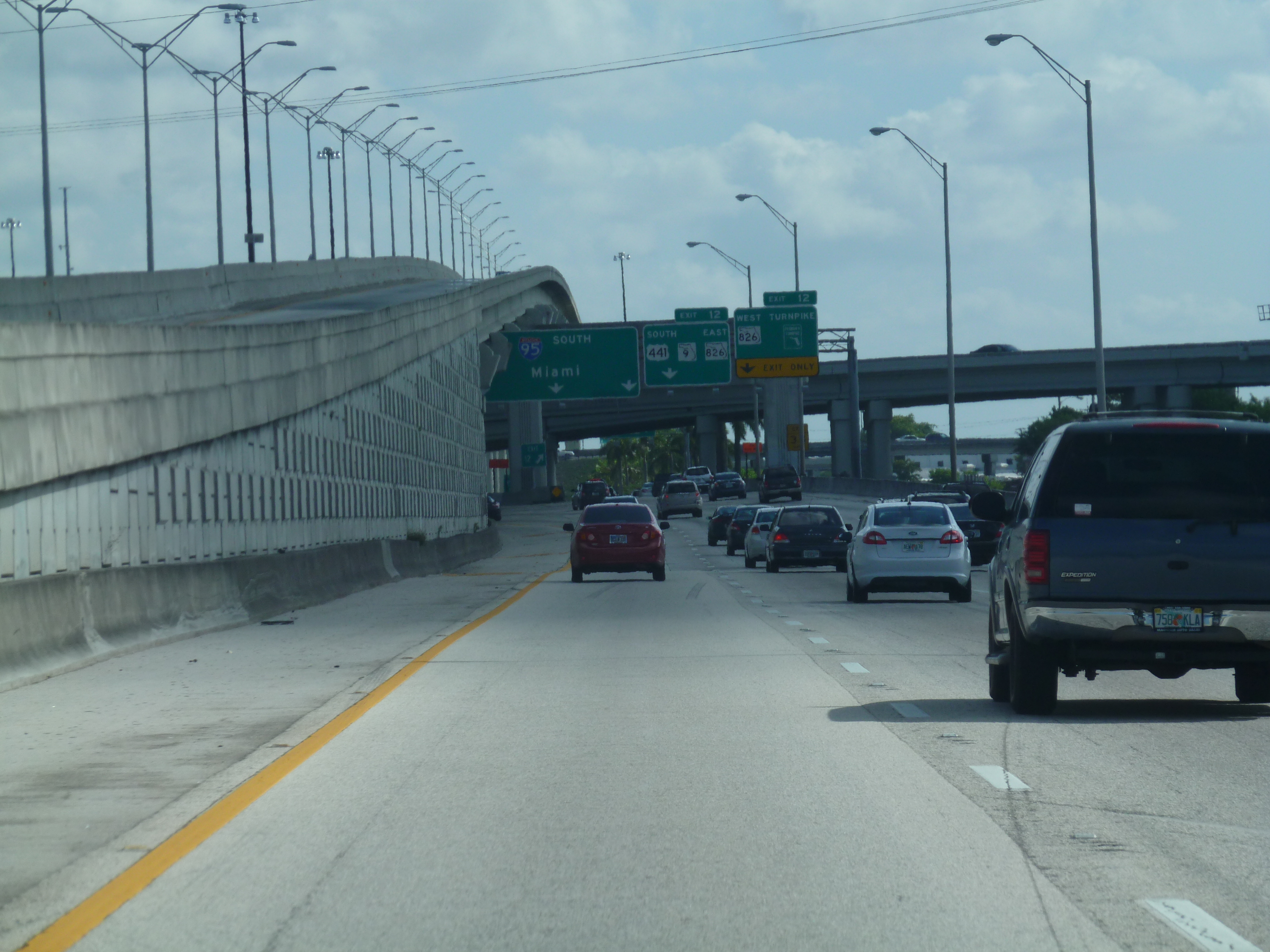
- The Golden Glades Interchange
- Interactive map of Golden Glades Interchange

Location
- Miami Gardens – North Miami Beach, Florida
- Coordinates: 25.92765°N 80.208203°W
- Roads at junction: I-95 (SR 9A); Florida's Turnpike (SR 91); US 441 / SR 7 SR 9 SR 826 (Palmetto Expressway)

Construction
- Opened: 1953
- Maintained by: FDOT

The Golden Glades Interchange, located in Miami Gardens and North Miami Beach, Florida, United States, is the confluence of six major roads serving eastern and southern Florida. It is named after the original name of North 167th Street, Golden Glades Road.

== Description ==
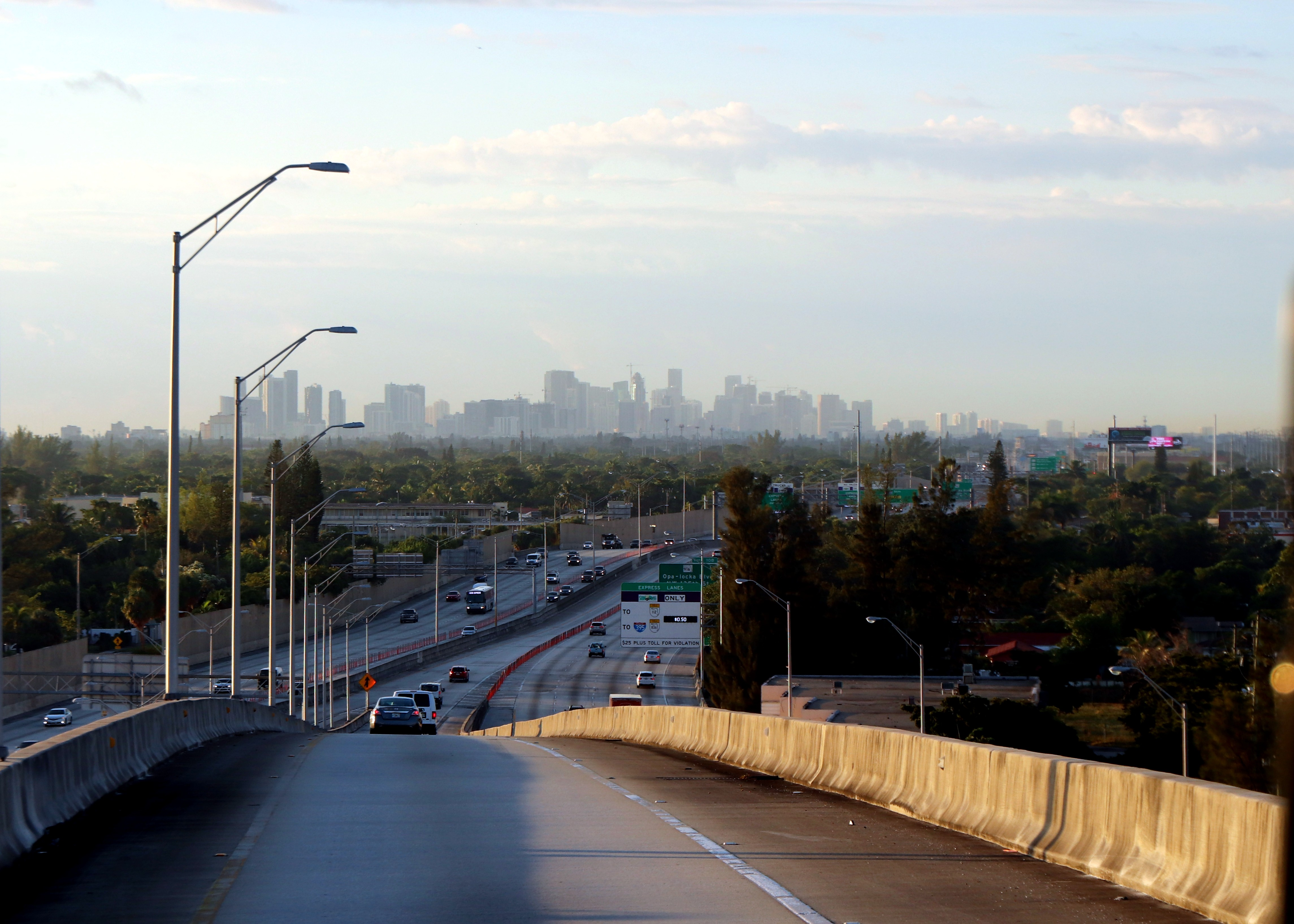
View of the Miami skyline from the express lane overpass

The six highways that come together at the interchange are U.S. Route 441 (US 441), Florida's Turnpike, the Palmetto Expressway (signed State Road 826), SR 9, North Miami Beach Boulevard (NW 167th Street) and Interstate 95 (I-95). US 441 bears SR 7 as a hidden designation, and the turnpike is similarly SR 91. SR 9 is the hidden designation for I-95 north of the interchange but branches southward off I-95 to become a major commercial road on its own accord. South of the interchange, I-95 bears SR 9A as its hidden designation.

== History ==
The Golden Glades interchange initially opened as an intersection between US 441 and SR 826 in 1953, expanding into its current form in the next decade. Its construction was prompted by a sequence of events spanning 12 years. In 1950, US 441 was extended from downtown Orlando to Miami to connect with a stretch of US 41 which sported US 94 road signs just a year earlier. In 1957, Florida's Turnpike (then called the Sunshine State Parkway) was completed in Dade (later Miami-Dade) County, joining SR 826 (which, at the time was Golden Glades Drive, an east–west street connecting US 1 along Biscayne Bay to US 27 inland). In 1958, construction of the north–south section of the Palmetto Bypass Expressway started, using SR 826 with a 90-degree eastward curve (the western section of SR 826 was to be abandoned). In 1959, construction of a segment of I-95, from Northwest 20th Street in Miami to SR 84 in Fort Lauderdale was started, along with I-195 and the Airport Expressway (SR 112) for access to Miami Beach and Miami International Airport. In 1961, construction of the Palmetto Bypass Expressway (the name was unofficially shortened in the mid-1960s), the Airport Expressway (then called the 36th Street Tollway), and the segment of I-95 south of Northwest 95th Street in Dade County were completed.

Anticipating increasing traffic to and from Dade County, FDOT broke ground on May 18, 1962, for the new Golden Glades Interchange. The section of I-95 from Golden Glades to SR 84 was completed in 1963; the Golden Glades Interchange and I-95 south to Northwest 95th Street opened on June 9, 1964.

The interchange was also known as the Interama Interchange until it was renamed the Golden Glades Interchange in 1977.

Flyovers to the Golden Glades station on the Tri-Rail commuter train line and a bus terminal (in the 1970s), as well as elevated HOV lanes (in 1995) have been added to it to accommodate the growing regional population, which has more than doubled since the interchange's opening in the mid 20th century. There were plans in the 1980s to reconstruct the interchange, but they were dropped due to high construction costs. The Golden Glades has been expanded and worked on several times over the years and is seen as a bottleneck in traffic on all the roads it incorporates.

=== 21st Century Upgrades and Reconstruction ===
In 2017, the Florida Department of Transportation (FDOT) planned to widen the turnpike connector to I-95 to five lanes, including two lanes from the turnpike and three lanes from the eastbound Palmetto Expressway. Three lanes were to exit to a relocated off-ramp to State Road 7, while the other three lanes would continue to I-95, which would receive an additional lane between the Golden Glades and Northwest 151st Street. The entrance to the southbound express lanes south of the Golden Glades was also moved 300 feet further south. In addition, the eastbound Palmetto ramp to I-95 was widened to three lanes – two to southbound I-95 and one on a new direct ramp to northbound I-95.

As of the mid-2020s, major work is ongoing to rebuild the Golden Glades Interchange with a new configuration designed to improve traffic flow, safety, and connectivity among five major roadways. The $908 million reconstruction project, begun in 2024 by FDOT and Florida’s Turnpike Enterprise, includes the construction of 32 new bridges, improved connections between I-95, Florida's Turnpike, SR 826, and other major routes, as well as new direct ramps to replace sharp 270-degree curves. Construction activities as of October 2025 include bridge work, stormwater drainage installation, and roadway paving, with the project scheduled for completion in 2031. These upgrades are expected to enhance safety and traffic flow for approximately 400,000 vehicles daily.

=== Traffic and Commuter Impact ===
The interchange serves as one of South Florida’s busiest transportation hubs, accommodating roughly 400,000 vehicles each day. The reconstruction project aims to alleviate congestion, improve commute times, and enhance regional mobility. Public feedback during construction has highlighted temporary delays and detours, but overall expectations are for significant long-term benefits for commuters.

=== Project Funding and Government Involvement ===
Funding for the $908 million project comes from multiple sources, including $150 million from Florida’s “Moving Florida Forward” initiative. This government investment reflects the commitment of state and local authorities to modernizing critical transportation infrastructure and addressing longstanding traffic bottlenecks in the Miami metropolitan area.

=== Engineering and Design Features ===
Key engineering improvements include new ramps, upgraded stormwater drainage systems, enhanced HOV lane access, and elimination of sharp curves. These upgrades are designed to increase traffic capacity, reduce accident risks, and integrate efficiently with existing infrastructure. The project represents a collaborative effort by FDOT and Stantec to implement innovative engineering solutions tailored to the interchange’s complexity.

=== Community and Environmental Considerations ===
The reconstruction project considers the impact on surrounding communities by improving access to public transit, including the Tri-Rail commuter train and nearby bus terminals. Pedestrian accessibility has also been enhanced, and measures have been implemented to minimize disruption to local neighborhoods. These efforts highlight a commitment to balancing infrastructure modernization with community and environmental concerns.

== See also ==
- Transportation in South Florida
- Dolphin–Palmetto Interchange
- Midtown Interchange
- Rainbow Interchange
- Sawgrass Interchange
