= Stack interchange =

Type of freeway interchange

A directional interchange, colloquially known as a stack interchange, is a type of grade-separated junction between two controlled-access highways that allows for free-flowing movement to and from all directions of traffic. These interchanges eliminate the problems of weaving, have the highest vehicle capacity, and vehicles travel shorter distances when compared to different types of interchanges.

The first directional interchange built in the world was the Four Level Interchange in Los Angeles; it was constructed in 1949 and put into full use in 1953.

== Definition ==
A directional interchange is a grade separated junction between two roads where all turns that require crossing over or under the opposite road's lanes of travel to complete the turn utilize ramps that make a direct or semi-direct connection. The difference between direct and semi-direct connections is how much the motorist deviates from the intended direction of travel while on the ramp. Direct ramps are shorter and can handle higher traveling speeds than semi-direct.

== Four-level stack ==
Four-level stack

The four-level stack (or simply four-stack) has one major freeway crossing another freeway with a viaduct, with connector flyover ramps crossing on two further levels. This type of interchange does not usually permit U-turns. The four-level stack creates two "inverse" dual-carriageways—the turn ramps crossing the middle section have traffic driving on the opposite side of oncoming traffic to usual (see diagram for clarity).

=== United States ===
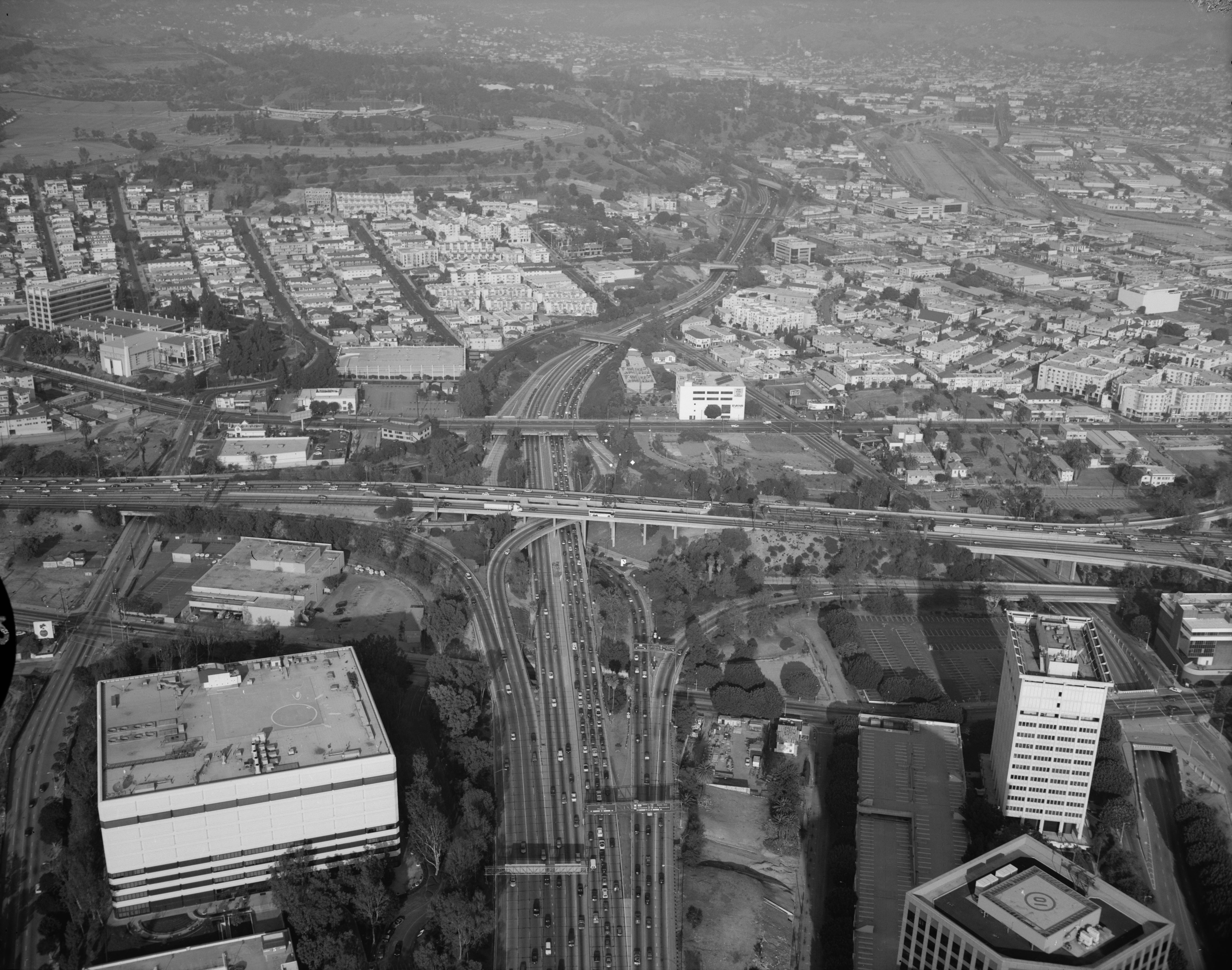
The Four Level Interchange of Arroyo Seco Parkway and Highway 101, looking northeast, in Los Angeles, California. It was the first stack interchange in the world.

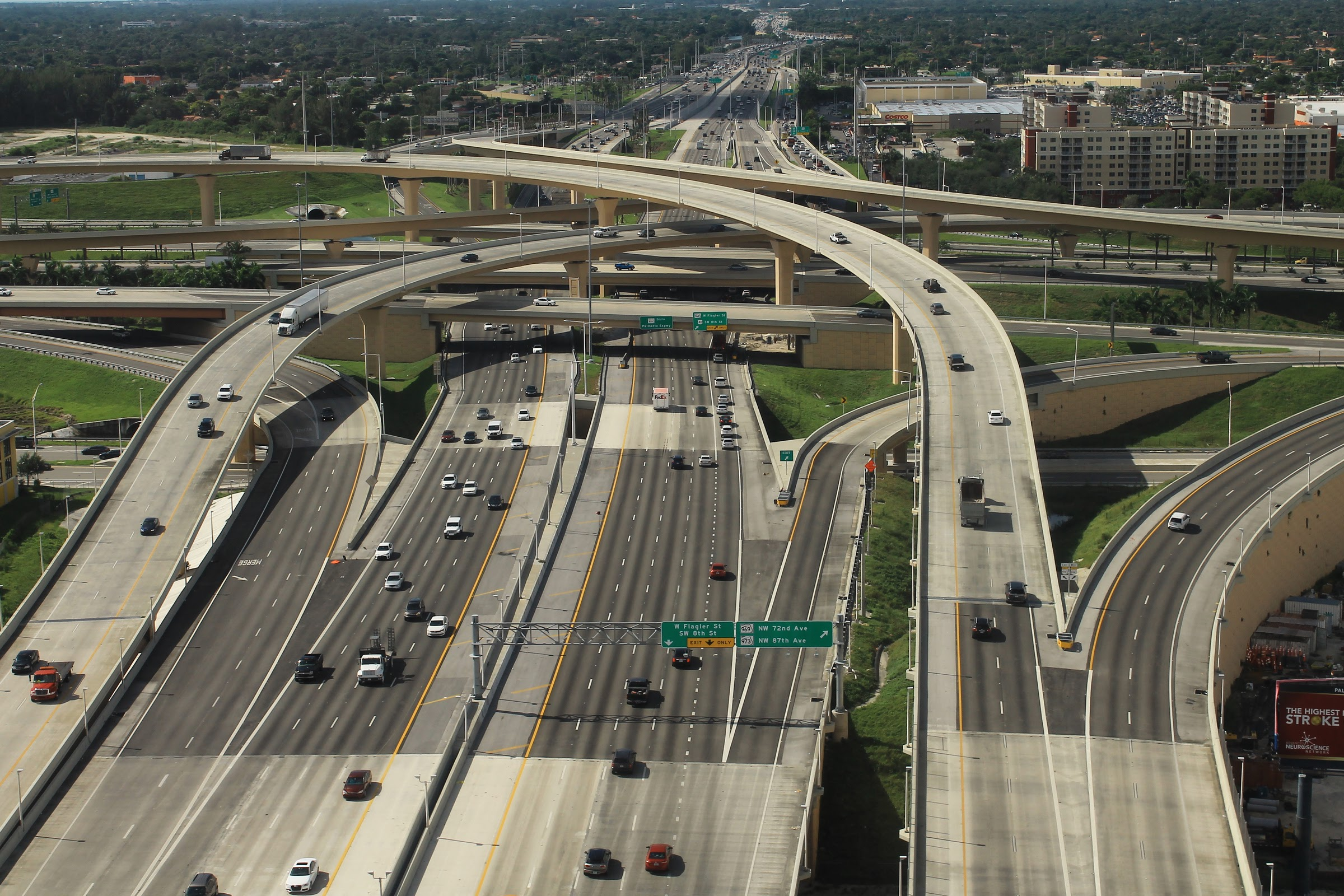
Highway Interchange between Dolphin Expressway and Palmetto Expressway (Dolphin–Palmetto Interchange) in Greater Miami, Florida, United States

The first stack interchange was the Four Level Interchange (renamed the Bill Keene Memorial Interchange), built in Los Angeles, California, and completed in 1949, at the junction of US Route 101 (US 101) and State Route 110 (SR 110). Since then, the California Department of Transportation (Caltrans) has built eight more four-level stacks throughout the state of California, notably the Judge Harry Pregerson Interchange, as well as a larger number of three-level and four-level stack–cloverleaf hybrids (where the least-used left-turning ramp is built as a cloverleaf-like 270-degree loop). The stack interchange between I-10 and I-405 is a three-level stack, since the semi-directional ramps are spaced out far enough so they do not need to cross each other at a single point as in a conventional four-level stack.

The first four-level stack interchange in Texas was built in Fort Worth at the intersection of I-35W and I-30 (originally I-20) near downtown. This interchange, finished in 1958, was known as "The Pretzel" or the "Mixmaster" by locals. The original contract cost was $1,220,000. Improvements to the old Mixmaster over the past 60 years include an upgrade to a Texas-style five-level stack exchange (see below).

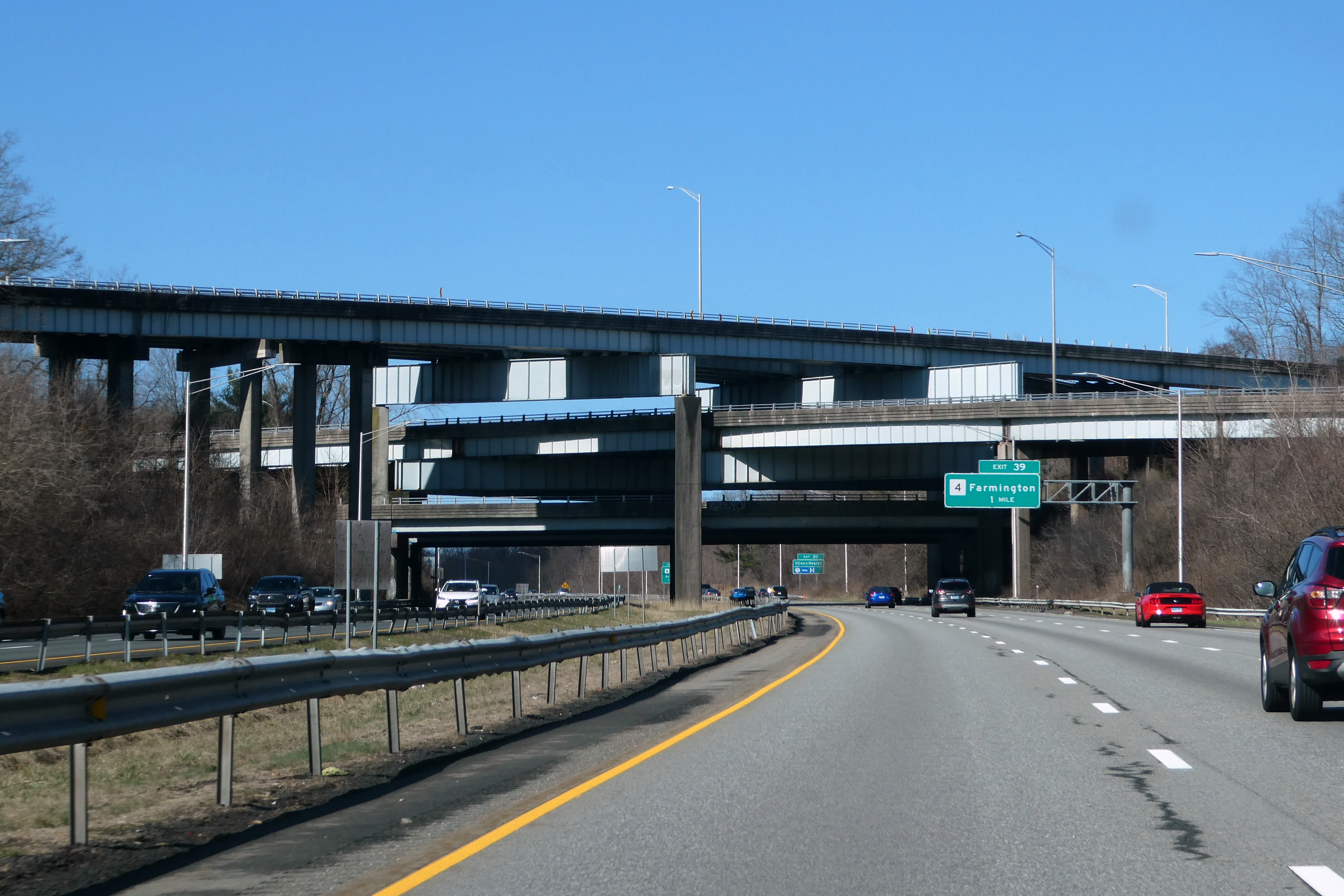
Partially used stack interchange over I‑84 in Connecticut

One of the first four-level stack interchanges in the northeastern United States was constructed in the late 1960s over I-84 in Farmington, Connecticut, for the controversial I-291 beltway around the city of Hartford. Most of the I‑291 beltway was later cancelled, and the sprawling stack lay dormant for almost 25 years. In 1992 the extension of Connecticut Route 9 to I-84 used the I‑291 right-of-way and some sections of the abandoned interchange. Several ramps still remain unused, including abandoned roadbed for I-291 both north and south of the complex.

Examples of four-level stacks include:

- The Stack in Phoenix, Arizona
- SuperRedTan Interchange in Mesa, Arizona
- Mini Stack in Phoenix, Arizona
- The Marquette Interchange between I-794, I-94, and I-43 in Milwaukee, Wisconsin; and
- The Zoo Interchange between I-894, I-94, I-41, and US 41/US 45 Milwaukee, Wisconsin.
- Both termini of E-470 at I-25 in Colorado.

The Springfield Interchange, south of Washington, D.C., was rebuilt into a four-level stack to accommodate I-95's transition from the Capital Beltway to its own alignment further south into Virginia. This was necessitated by the inadequacy of the original configuration that was caused by the rerouting of I-95 onto the Beltway after its cancellation within Washington and points north.

=== Canada ===
The initial design of Highway 407 had several four-level stack interchanges planned at junctions with existing 400-series highways, but only one example was built: the interchange at Highway 400 in Vaughan, Ontario, which is also the only true four-level stack in Canada. Highway 407's other proposed four-level stacks at Highway 410 and Highway 404 were reduced to three-level cloverstack interchanges, with loop ramps being built instead of a fourth level of semi-directional ramps. Similarly, the interchange with Highway 427 has four levels but only two semi-directional flyover ramps that cross each other connecting to Highway 427 south of that junction. Two loop ramps link Highway 407 with Highway 427 north of that junction.

=== Europe ===
In Belgium, on the Brussels Ring there are two four-level stack interchanges: The Grand-Bigard and Machelen interchange (only partly in use).

In Germany, there is one, the Wetzlarer Kreuz.

In Greece, there is also one four stack interchange near Metamorfosi, which connects the A1 and A6 (Attiki Odos) motorways.

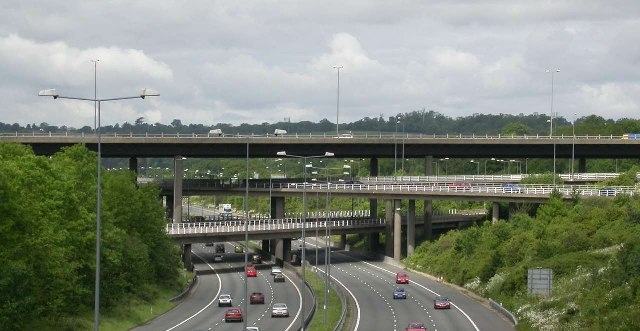
Stack interchange in the United Kingdom. This one is the Merstham Interchange between the M23 and the M25 in London

In the Netherlands there is currently one four-level stack interchange: the Prins Clausplein near The Hague. It forms the junction of the A4 and A12.

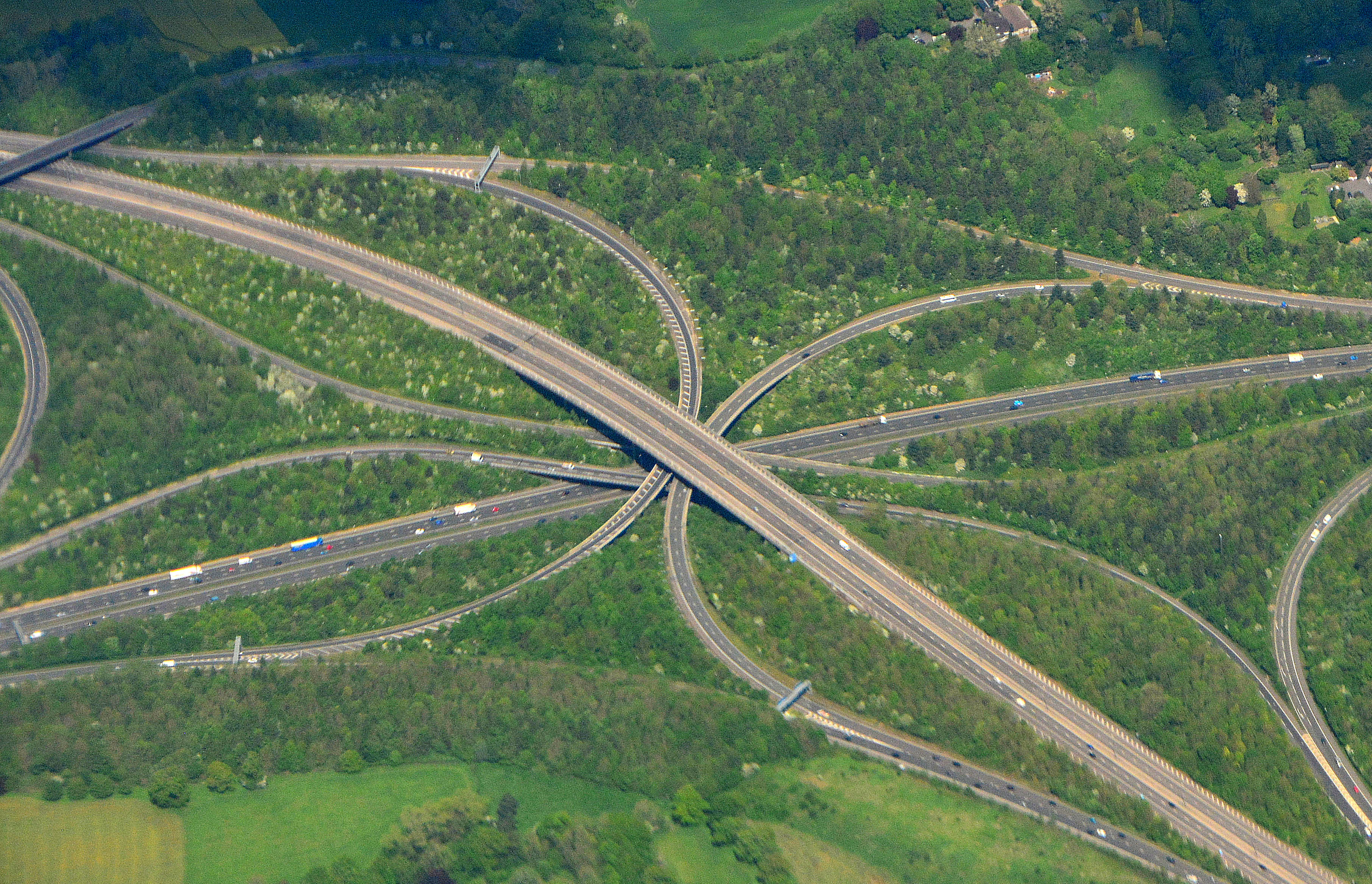
M23 and M25 interchange, UK

In the United Kingdom four-level stacks include the Thorney Interchange at the junction of the M4 and M25 near Heathrow Airport in London; and the Almondsbury Interchange at the junction of the M4 and M5 near Bristol.

=== Asia ===
In Qatar’s capital and largest city, Doha, The Umm Beshr Interchange is a traditional 4-level stack interchange between the Qatar Express Highway, heading north in the direction of Downtown Doha and G Ring Road, which provides access to Doha and Hamad International Airport. It is currently the tallest interchange in Qatar.

=== Southern Hemisphere ===
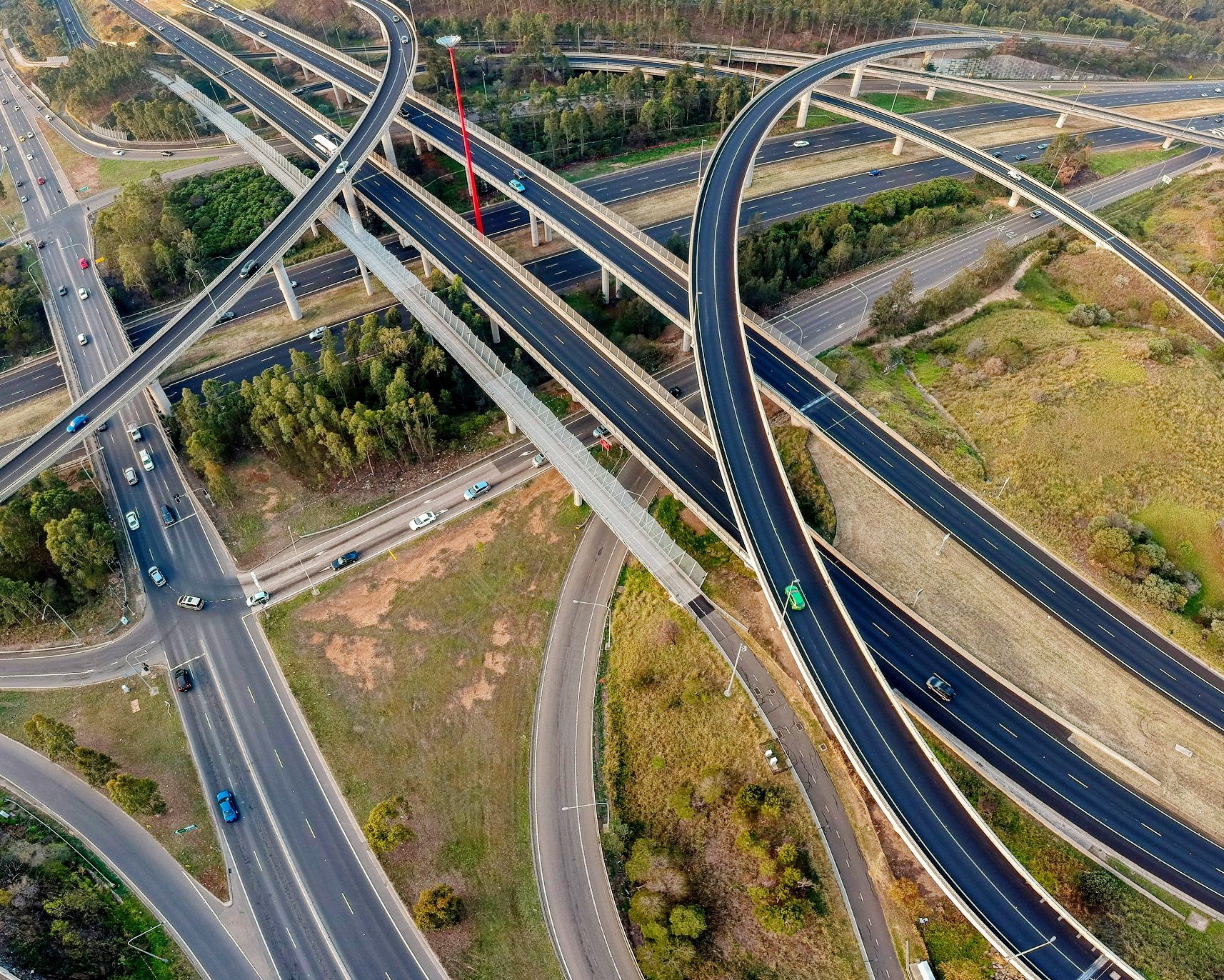
The Light Horse Interchange in Sydney is the largest in the southern hemisphere.

The Light Horse Interchange at the junction of the M4 and M7 is a four-level stack interchange in Sydney, New South Wales, Australia. Opened in late 2005, it is the largest in the Southern Hemisphere.

The EB Cloete Interchange just outside Durban, South Africa, is another four-level stack interchange. The N3 is the busiest highway in South Africa and a very busy truck route. Because Johannesburg is not located near a body of water, most of the city's exports travel through the Port of Durban. The N2 connects Cape Town with Durban and serves the South African cities of Port Elizabeth, East London and George and the towns of Grahamstown, Port Shepstone, Richards Bay and the iSimangaliso Wetland Park. Two busy roads intersect at the junction. A four-level stack interchange was chosen to serve the high volumes of traffic.

The Mount Edgecombe Interchange is another four-level stack interchange just outside Durban, South Africa, and is the intersection between the N2 (to Durban and KwaDukuza) and the M41 (to Mount Edgecombe and uMhlanga). The interchange which was previously a simple diamond interchange was upgraded to a four-level/four-stack interchange, with the upgraded interchange opened in October 2018. A four-level stack interchange was chosen to serve the increasing volumes of traffic in the uMhlanga/Mount Edgecombe area.

== Five-level stack ==
=== Texas-style stack ===
In Texas, many stacks contain five levels. They usually have the same configuration as four-level stacks, but frontage roads add a fifth level. The frontage roads usually intersect with traffic lights and are similar to a grid of nearby one-way streets. A common setup is for one mainline to go below grade and another to go above grade. The intersection of the frontage roads is typically at grade or close to it. Two pairs of left-turn connectors are built above these.

The Dallas–Fort Worth metroplex has several five-level stacks, most notably the High Five Interchange between US 75 and I-635; completed in 2005 and currently the tallest interchange in the world. Others can be found at the interchanges between State Highway 121 (SH 121) and the Dallas North Tollway, SH 121 and I-35E/US 77, I-30 and I-35W, I-30 and President George Bush Turnpike and others which are technically five levels but do not fit under a Texas-style stack configuration (i.e. the extra level being located away from the central stack or existing in only one direction).

The Houston area has seven five-level stack interchanges along Beltway 8: at I-10 east and west of downtown, I-69 northeast and southwest of downtown, I-45 north and south of downtown, and US 290 in the beltway's northwest quadrant. The newly reconstructed interchange of I-610 and I-69, with the new I‑610 northbound feeder road built underground and the new I-610 southbound feeder road overpass, is also a five-level stack interchange.

Though not a Texas-style stack in the above sense, an unusual stack is nonetheless found in Houston that features more than four levels of traffic but whose fifth level exists in only one direction. In 2011, the previously four-level stack interchange between I-610 and I-10 on the city's east side gained a new (though long-planned) level of complexity with the opening of four ramps connecting the new US 90 (Crosby Freeway) to the east, featuring direct movements for the new freeway to and from the southeast quadrant of I-610, to westbound I-10, and from eastbound I-10. It is the latter ramp which gives the interchange the fifth level, as US 90 to I-10 westbound merges onto I-10 before crossing I-610. (None of the frontage roads for these highways cross the interchange itself, and thus do not factor into the complexity of the stack.)

More than 40 bridges make up the five-level stack interchange known as the Big I between I-40 and I-25 in Albuquerque, New Mexico.

China is also home to many Texas-style stack interchanges. For example the Nanjing's Yingtian Street Elevated has one each where it intersects the Inner Ring Road twice.

=== Other five-level stacks ===
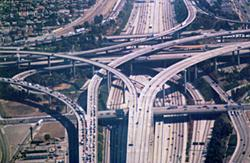
The Judge Harry Pregerson Interchange in Los Angeles, California, United States

Sometimes a fifth level is added for HOV connectors. An example of this exists in Los Angeles, California, at the Judge Harry Pregerson Interchange. The connector from HOV southbound 110 to HOV westbound 105 can be at the same level as the connector from mixed eastbound 105 to mixed northbound 110, but the connector from HOV southbound 110 to HOV eastbound 105 needs to be higher level, since it crosses over the former connector.

Another case is where connection to nearby arterials suggests that another level may be useful, thus making the interchange more complicated but easier to use. In the Atlanta area, a side ramp forms the fifth level of the Tom Moreland Interchange, colloquially known as Spaghetti Junction, found in DeKalb County, Georgia.

== Six-level stack ==
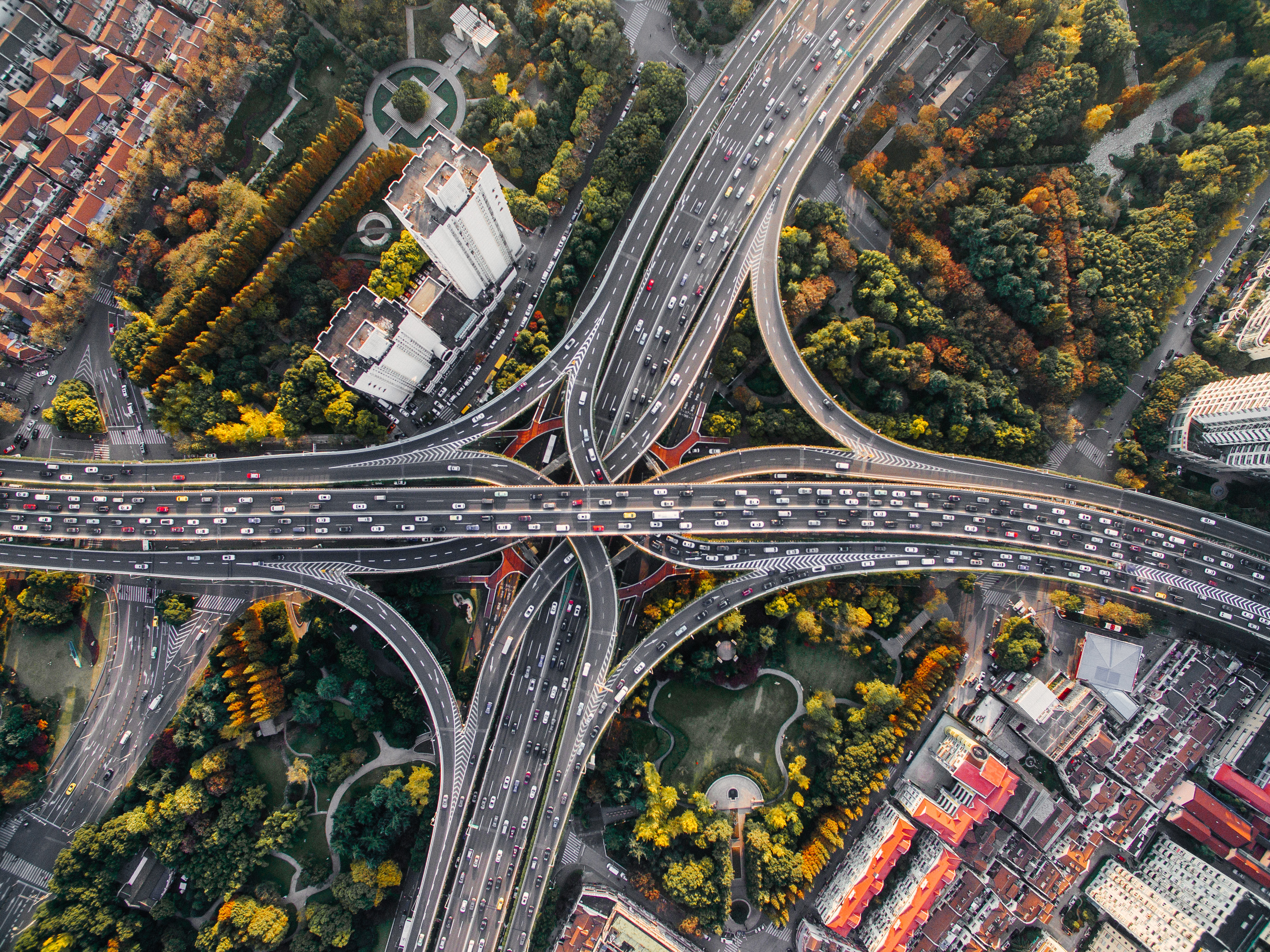
Yan'an East Road Interchange, a six-level urban stack interchange in Puxi, Shanghai, China (Nanbei Elevated Road and Yan'an Elevated Road)

There is a six-level stack on the Yan'an East Road Interchange (Chinese: 延安东路立交) in Puxi, Shanghai, with no dedicated HOV/bus/truck lanes. It is a six-level stack because it is formed by two elevated highways, Nanbei Elevated Road and Yan'an Elevated Road with service roads and a footbridge underneath. The centrally located interchange has a central pillar known as the Nine-Dragon Pillar (九龙柱). The story is that after several construction accidents, a monk suggested the nine-dragon be welcomed with a bas relief sculpture depicting the dragon.

An unusual six-level stack is located at the junction between Interstate 35E and I-635 in Dallas, Texas, and does not contain any service or frontage roads. The interchange features two levels of highway with the top three levels consisting of direct connection ramps and HOV connectors. A single ramp leading from I-635 westbound to I-35E southbound weaves underneath the I-635 eastbound bridge, making the interchange six levels.

The interchange between I-35E and the Sam Rayburn Tollway in Lewisville, Texas, although similar in design to five-level stacks elsewhere in Texas, also qualifies as a six-level stack, since the ramp connecting the eastbound Sam Rayburn Tollway with northbound I-35E goes over the fifth-level ramps connecting I-35E in both directions with the Sam Rayburn Tollway. The ramp connecting the westbound Sam Rayburn Tollway with southbound I-35E is on the fourth level of the interchange, going under the fifth-level ramps connecting both directions of I-35E with the Sam Rayburn Tollway.

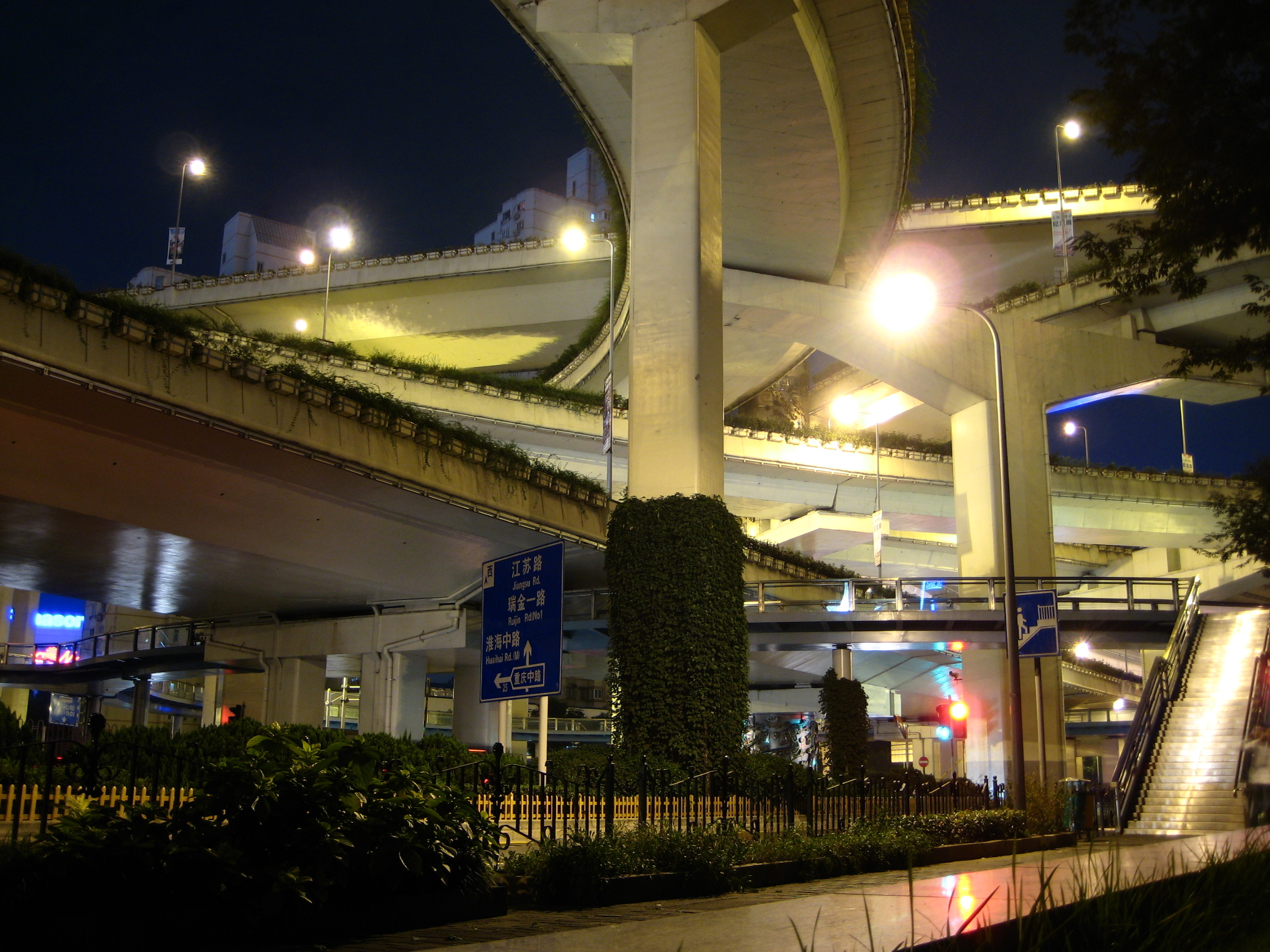
Yan'an East Road Interchange, seen from a pedestrian's perspective

== See also ==
Comparison of traffic flows for some four-legged complete interchanges (animation)

- List of road interchanges in the United States
