= U.S. Route 1 in Florida =

Highway in Florida

U.S. Highway 1
- US 1 highlighted in red

Route information
- Maintained by FDOT
- Length: 545.03 mi (877.14 km)
- Existed: November 11, 1926–present
- Tourist routes: Florida Keys Scenic Highway

Major junctions
- South end: Fleming Street in Key West
- Florida's Turnpike Extension in Florida City; I-95 / SR 913 in Miami; US 41 in Miami; I-395 / SR A1A in Miami; US 27 in Miami; I-595 in Fort Lauderdale; US 98 / SR 80 in West Palm Beach; US 92 in Daytona Beach; US 90 in Jacksonville; I-295 in Jacksonville
- North end: US 1 / US 23 / US 301 / SR 4 / SR 15 near Folkston, GA

Location
- Country: United States
- State: Florida
- Counties: Monroe, Miami-Dade, Broward, Palm Beach, Martin, St. Lucie, Indian River, Brevard, Volusia, Flagler, St. Johns, Duval, Nassau

Highway system
- United States Numbered Highway System; List; Special; Divided; Florida State Highway System; Interstate; US; State; Former; Pre‑1945; Toll; Scenic
← SR 9336	→ SR A1A
← SR 804	SR 805	→ SR 806

U.S. Highway 1 (US 1) in Florida runs 545 miles (877 km) along the state's east coast from Key West to its crossing of the St. Marys River into Georgia north of Boulogne and south of Folkston. US 1 was designated through Florida when the U.S. Numbered Highway System was established in 1926. With the exception of Monroe County, the highway runs through the easternmost tier of counties in the state, connecting numerous towns and cities along its route, including nine county seats. The road is maintained by the Florida Department of Transportation (FDOT).

From its national southern terminus in Key West, US 1 carries the Overseas Highway, which is the Keys's main highway, north to the mainland, entering South Florida. From South Florida to Jacksonville, US 1 runs close to the coastline of the Atlantic Ocean and the Intracoastal Waterway, generally east of Interstate 95 (I-95) and west of State Road A1A (SR A1A), running roughly parallel with both roads. North of Jacksonville, US 1 curves inland toward the St. Mary's River as it enters Georgia.

As is the case with all Florida roads with national designations, the entirety of US 1 has a hidden FDOT designation:

- SR 5 from Whitehead Street/Fleming Street in Key West to Federal Highway (SR 5 north) in Lantana, Belvedere Road in West Palm Beach to the I-95/Kings Avenue (SR 5 north) interchange in Jacksonville, and the Main Street (SR 5 south) on/offramps south of the Main Street Bridge to US 1 Alternate (US 1 Alt.)/US 17 in Jacksonville.
- SR 805 from Federal Highway in Lantana to Belvedere Road in West Palm Beach.
- SR 9 from the I-95/Kings Avenue interchange in Jacksonville to the Main Street exit heading toward the Main Street bridge via the I-95 service road.
- SR 10 from the Atlantic Boulevard (US 90 east/SR 10 east) interchange to Beaver Street (US 90 west/SR 10 west) in Downtown Jacksonville via Main Street.
- SR 115 from US 1 Alt./US 17 in Jacksonville to the junction with I-95/SR 15 south/SR 115 north via the Martin Luther King Jr. Parkway.
- SR 15 from the I-95 interchange in Jacksonville to the Georgia state line near Boulogne.

Among other designations, US 1 is a designated Blue Star Memorial Highway along its entire route through the state. Markers are placed at various locations, including one in Rockledge and Fort Lauderdale.

== Route description ==
=== The Keys ===
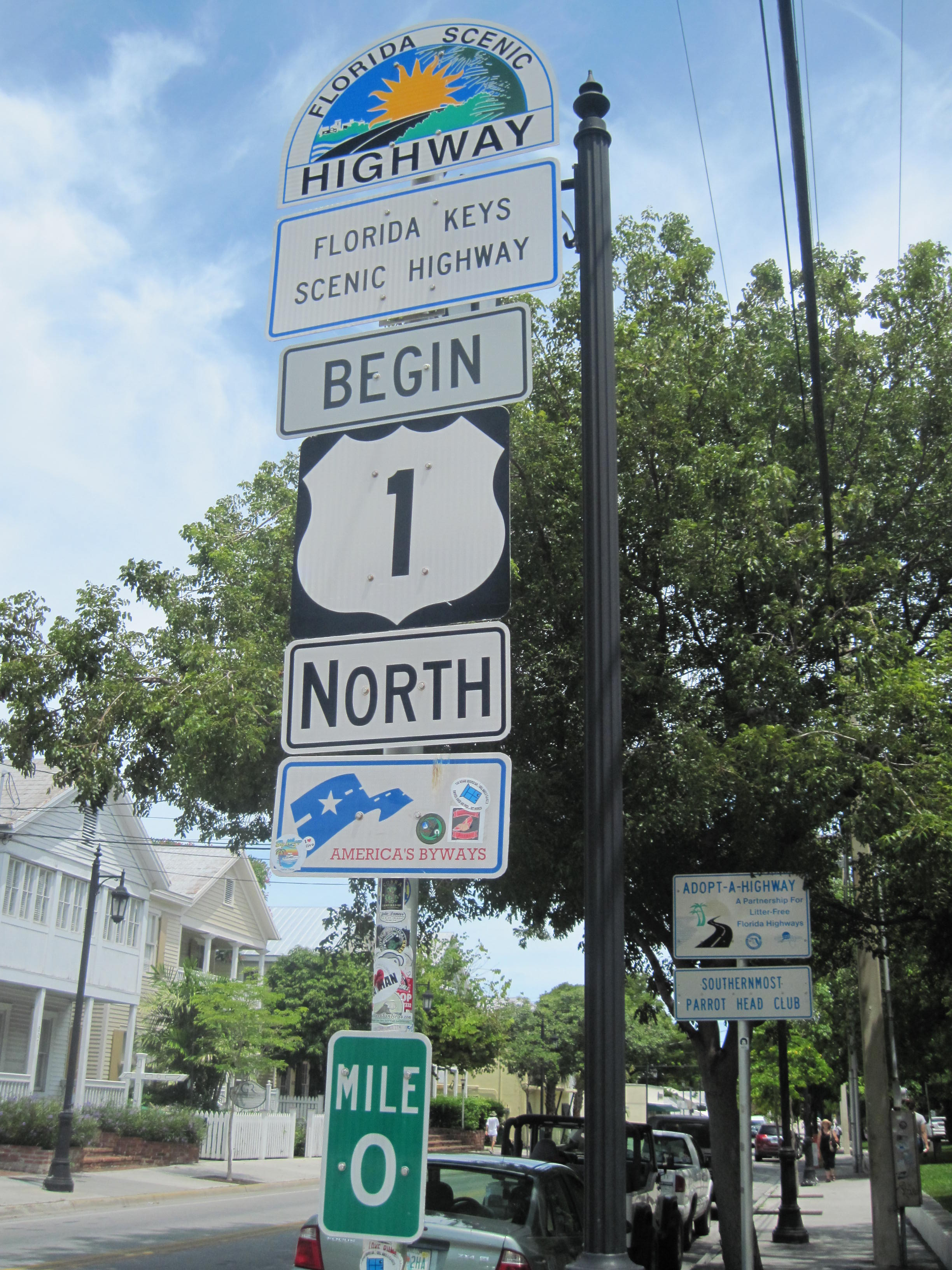
Mile 0 in Key West, this sign is a tourist attraction

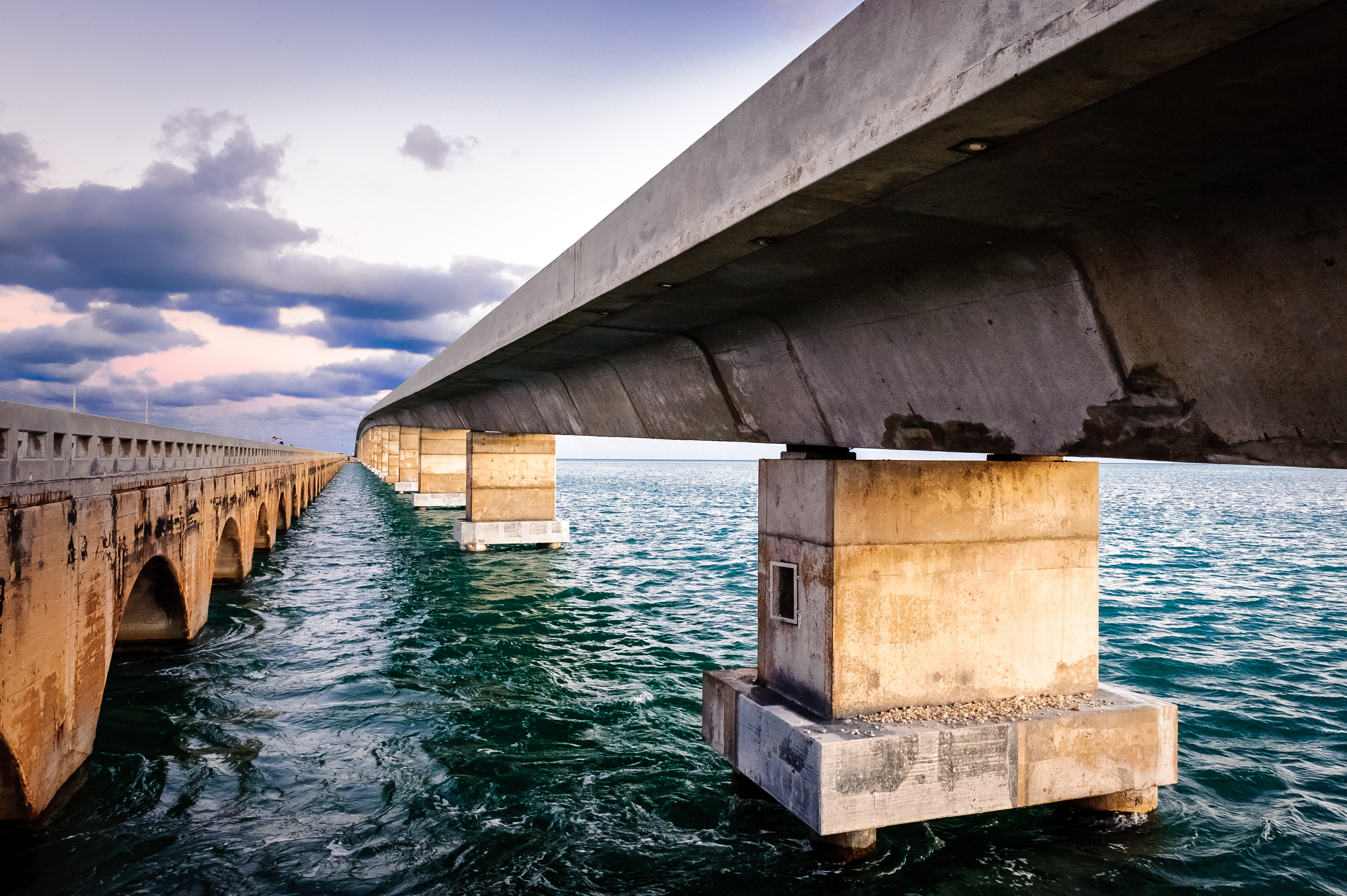
Overseas Highway and Railway bridges, Florida Keys

US 1 officially begins its northward journey at the Monroe County courthouse at the intersection of Whitehead and Fleming streets in Key West. It proceeds south as Whitehead Street, a two-lane street, until the intersection with Truman Avenue, which takes it east through central Key West. Truman Avenue becomes North Roosevelt Boulevard about a mile (1.6 km) east and remains so until leaving the island; US 1 expands to four lanes along its length. The road follows the northern shore of this section of Key West, then after curving southward, it meets SR A1A head-on at a T intersection before continuing east. This intersection also marks the southern terminus of the Overseas Highway, which US 1 is known by between here and mainland Florida.

After crossing to Stock Island and forming the boundary between the eponymous district and incorporated Key West, US 1 proceeds through unincorporated Monroe County on Boca Chica Key, past Naval Air Station Key West, and Rockland Key, where the Overseas Highway drops down to a two-lane road. It then crosses East Rockland Key, Big Coppitt Key (and its congruous district), Saddlebunch Keys, Sugarloaf Key, Park Key, Cudjoe Key (and its congruous district), Summerland Key, Ramrod Key, Middle Torch Key, Little Torch Key, Big Pine Key (and its congruous district), Scout Key, and Spanish Harbor Key. The highway expands to four lanes as it crosses the Bahia Honda Bridge, then reduces to two lanes as it traverses Bahia Honda Key, Ohio Key, Missouri Key, and Little Duck Key. After Little Duck Key, US 1 enters Knights Key, Boot Key, Key Vaca, and the town of Marathon via the Seven Mile Bridge, thus leaving the lower Keys.

US 1 runs through Marathon as a four-lane road. After Key Vaca, the road becomes two-lane once more and runs through Fat Deer Key, where it forms the northern boundary of the city of Key Colony Beach. It then continues wholly in Marathon through Long Point Key, Crawl Key, and Grassy Key. The road then crosses to Little Conch Key and then Conch Key, both part of the Duck Key district. US 1 then crosses to and traverses Long Key, which is mostly unincorporated except for the city of Layton, which the highway passes through. The road then reaches Craig Key, and then the village of Islamorada including Lower Matecumbe Key, Tea Table Key, Upper Matecumbe Key, and Windley Key. US 1 crosses a drawbridge onto Plantation Key, where it expands to four lanes and then leaves Islamorada as it crosses to Key Largo. Immediately the Overseas Highway enters Tavernier, where it temporarily splits into a pair of one-way roads through the community. Soon, the road enters the community of Key Largo, which also features another pair of one-way roads. At the northern end of the Key Largo district, about two-thirds of the way along the island, US 1 intersects County Road 905 (CR 905), which offers an alternative route out of the Keys via North Key Largo and the Card Sound Bridge. Signage approaching the intersection directs northbound motorists to take this alternative route if the lights on it are flashing. US 1 swings to the northwest, forms the southern boundary of North Key Largo, and becomes a two-lane divided road after the intersection. After crossing the Jewfish Creek Bridge (where it enters unincorporated Monroe County again) and traveling along Cross Key, US 1 crosses Manatee Creek, along with the Miami-Dade County boundary, and reaches the mainland, marking the northern end of the Overseas Highway.

=== Miami-Dade County ===
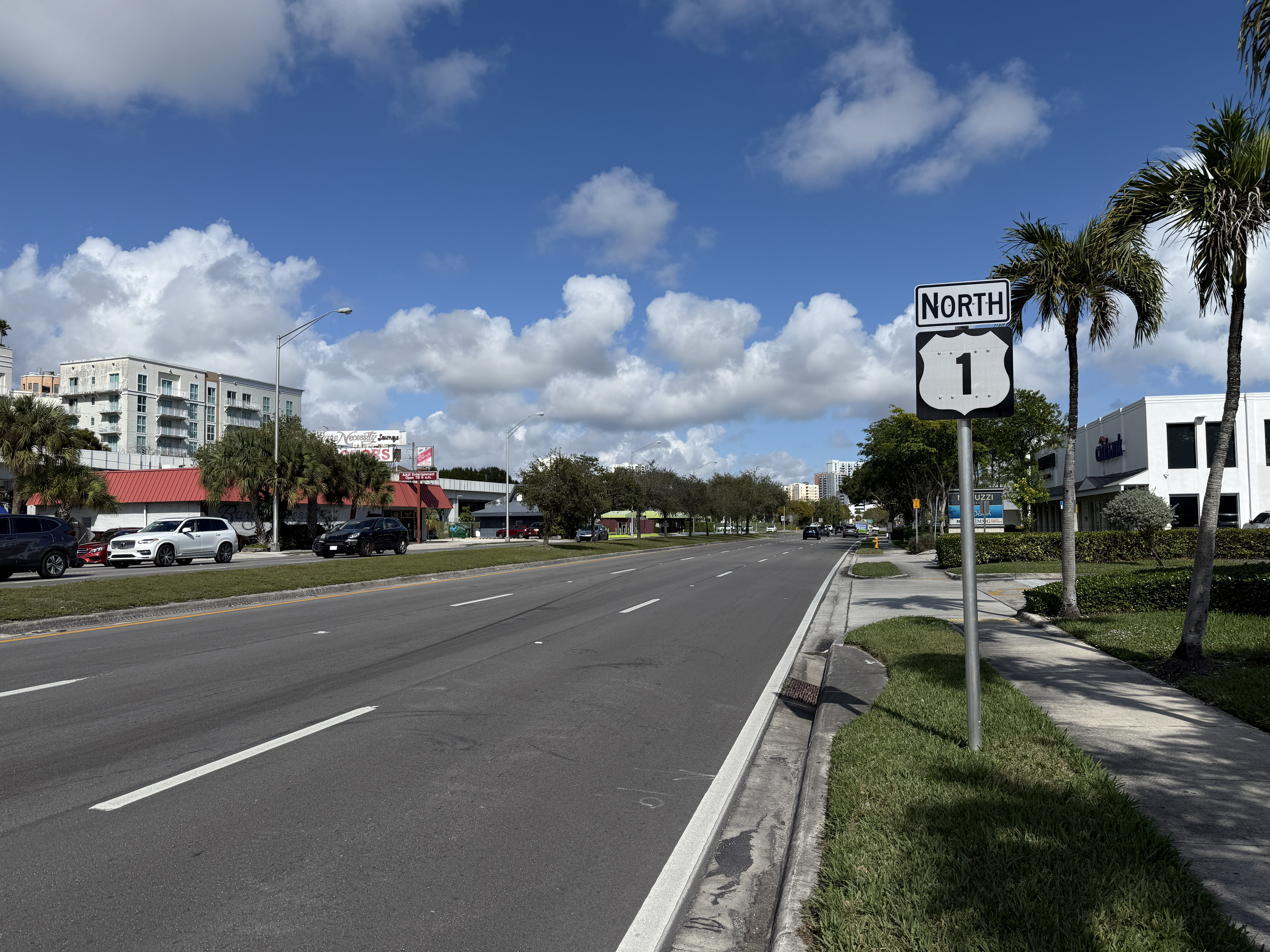
Portion of the South Dixie Highway, just south of Dadeland Mall

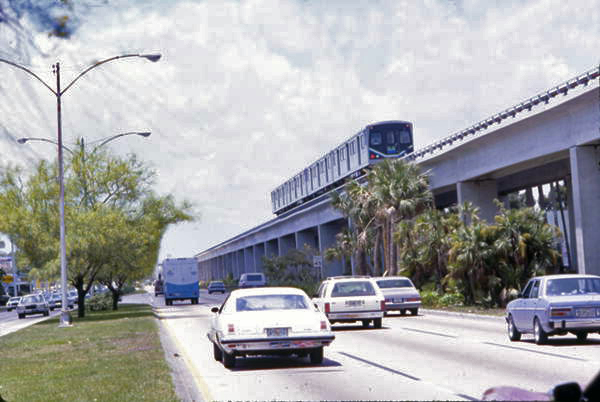
Metrorail traveling above South Dixie Highway in the mid-1980s

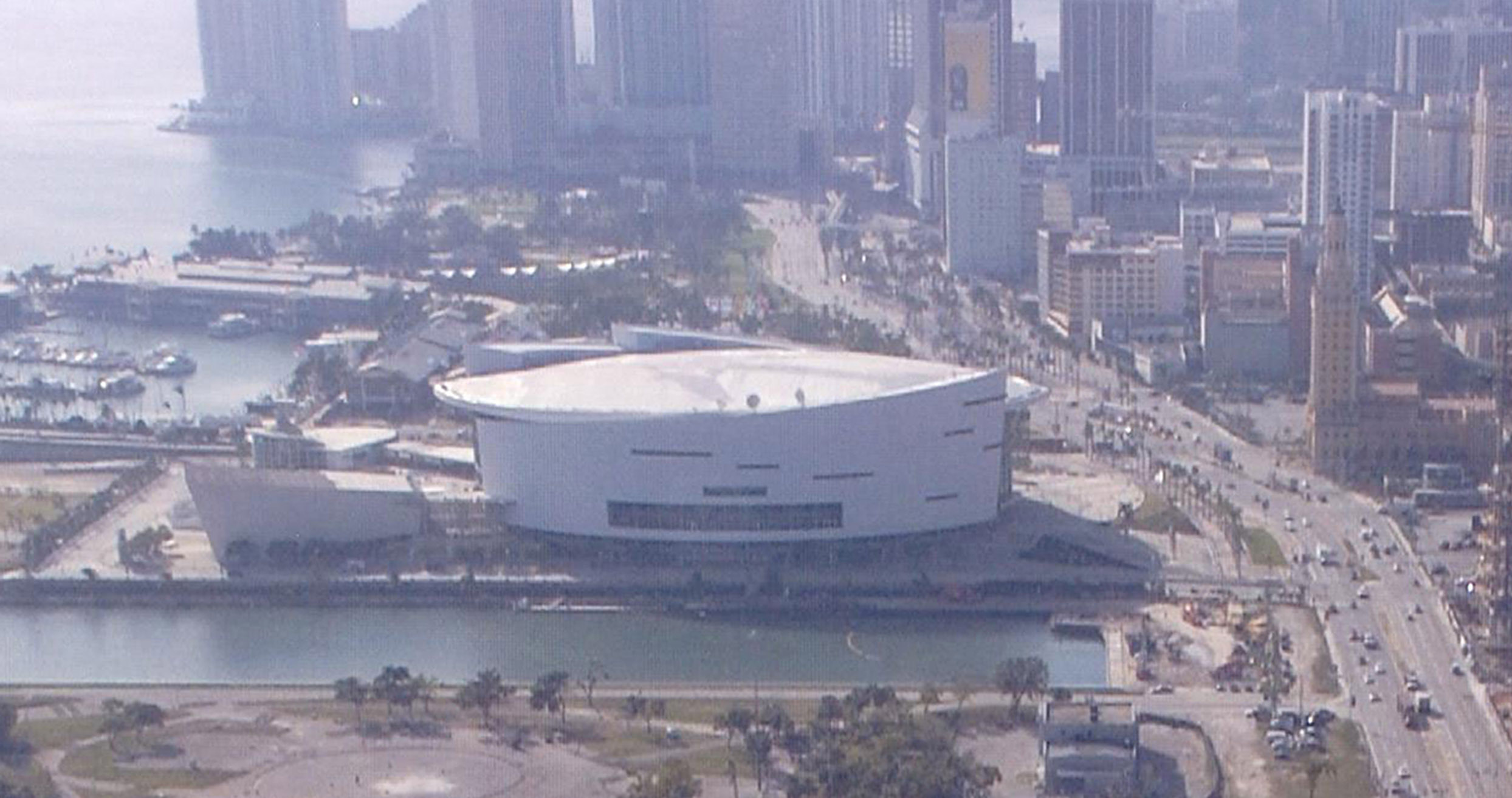
American Airlines Arena on Biscayne Boulevard; US 1 can be seen on the right side of the picture.

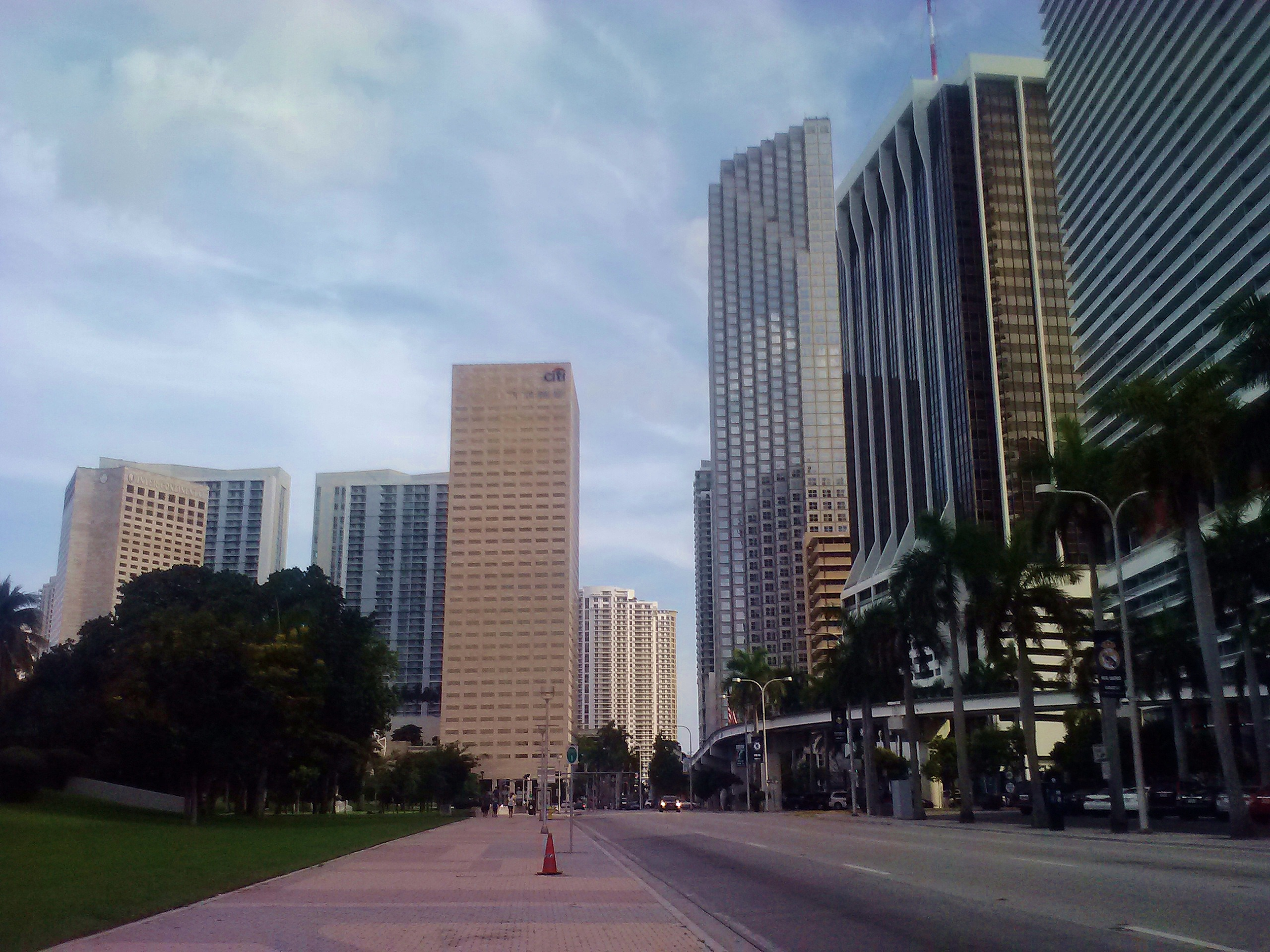
Biscayne Boulevard in Downtown Miami

For the first 14 miles (23 km) in Miami-Dade County, US 1 is a divided two-lane road bordering Everglades National Park on the west. It is named South Dixie Highway from the county line to Miami. Its first major intersection is with the north end of Card Sound Road south of Florida City. Similarly, to the south, signage directs southbound travelers approaching this intersection to take Card Sound Road if the lights on it are flashing rather than taking US 1 south to Key Largo.

Just north of the Card Sound Road intersection, US 1 meets the southern end of Krome Avenue (former SR 997) and then enters Florida City. Here, US 1 intersects SR 9336, providing access westward to Everglades National Park; at the same intersection, Palm Drive (former SR 906) likewise provides access eastward to Biscayne National Park. From here northbound, the South Dixie Highway is paralleled by the South Dade TransitWay along the former Florida East Coast Railway alignment. Near-immediately northbound of the Palm Drive intersection, US 1 meets the southern end of the Homestead Extension of Florida's Turnpike and then crosses into Homestead at South 328th Street. The road then curves northeast through Homestead, parallel to Florida's Turnpike, leaving the city north of South 304th Street and continuing northeast through the communities of Leisure City, Modello, Naranja, Princeton, and Goulds.

At West 112th Avenue/Allapattah Road (SR 989), US 1 enters the incorporated town of Cutler Bay, soon passes under the Homestead Extension of Florida's Turnpike, and continues northeast in the town until at South 186th Street it forms the town's border for two blocks before leaving at South 184th Street. From here, the road continues northeast from this point, forming the western boundary of Palmetto Bay. In Perrine, it meets SR 994, and then divides into a one-way pair of streets, with northbound traffic directed east one block of the southbound traffic along a sweeping curve between South 183rd and South 168th streets. After the two directions of traffic rejoin, the road meets Coral Reef Drive (SR 992), then passes through Rockdale and Howard until it reaches South 136th Street (Howard Drive), meets the southern terminus of SR 973 a block later, and serves to divide Pinecrest to the southeast and Kendall and Dadeland to the northwest for the next few miles. The road is also known as Pinecrest Parkway through this section. Also through this section, US 1 meets the eastern terminus of SR 990, the southern terminus of the Palmetto Expressway (SR 826), and the eastern terminus of SR 94 at Kendall Drive. Dadeland South station lies just north of the Palmetto Expressway, on US 1's western side, and acts as the handover point between the South Dade TransitWay and the Metrorail line, which proceeds to parallel US 1 for most of its subsequent journey into Downtown Miami.

North of Snapper Creek (Canal C-2), US 1 continues northeast and enters another section of unincorporated Miami-Dade County. Here, US 1 forms the Snapper Creek Expressway (SR 878)'s eastern terminus. The South Dixie Highway then crosses into South Miami at South 80th Street. At SR 959 (Red Road/West 57th Avenue), US 1 leaves South Miami and enters Coral Gables, passing the main campus of the University of Miami and headed northeast. At West 38th Avenue (Brooker Street), it leaves Coral Gables and enters Miami, heading northeast toward the southern terminus of I-95 just south of Downtown Miami. At this point, there is a signage gap in the route, though since 2013, it is federally and state defined as cosigning with I-95 and SR 970 all the way to Biscayne Boulevard, where US 1 signage resumes. However, some mapmakers like Rand McNally and Google Maps continue to sign US 1 along its original alignment via Brickell Avenue.

In Miami, US 1 first intersects SR 976, followed by the south end of SR 9, which ends up running concurrent with I-95 and is also I-95's state designation through most of Florida. About a mile (1.6 km) east, it meets the national southern terminus of I-95, which it joins over the Miami River into downtown.

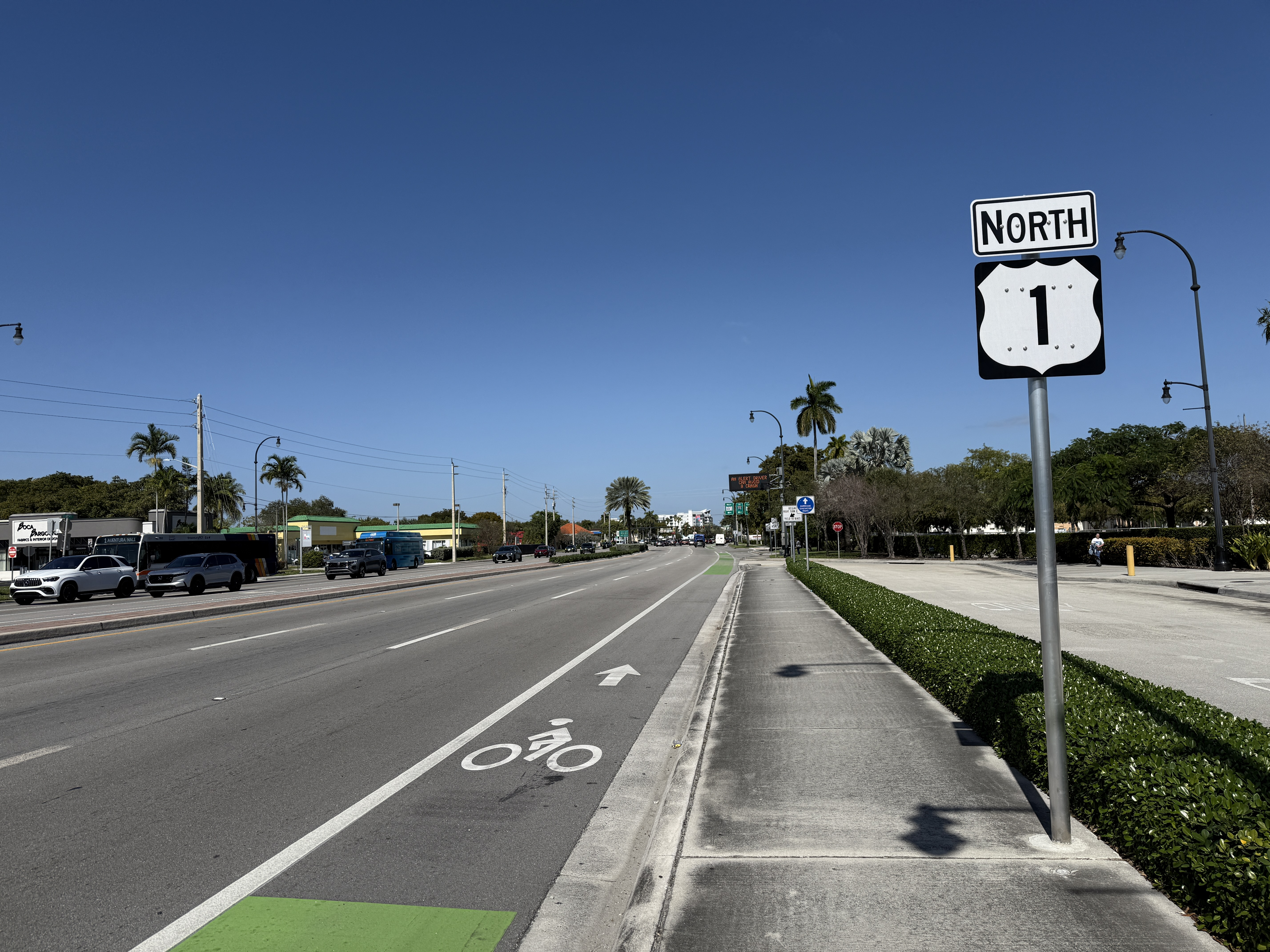
US 1 northbound in Hallandale Beach

The road is then named Biscayne Boulevard through the rest of Miami-Dade County as it proceeds north on Biscayne Bay. As Biscayne Boulevard, US 1 becomes a one-way pair at an intersection with SR 970. Two blocks north, it reaches SR 968 (Flagler Street), the north–south baseline for most of Miami-Dade County. US 1 then passes by the western end of Bayfront Park and then intersects Port Boulevard (Northeast 6th Street), providing access to PortMiami, with Kaseya Center at the northeastern end of the intersection. For the next few blocks, it passes by Museum Park, with I-395 at the northern end, which also marks the national southern terminus of US 41. US 1 continues through Midtown Miami, intersecting with the national southern terminus of US 27 one block south of I-195 next to the Julia Tuttle Causeway. North of I-195, the road continues through Miami as a residential road, intersecting SR 944, SR 934, and SR 915 before leaving Miami. Moving further inland, the boulevard replaces East Sixth Avenue at 61st Street. It enters the village of Miami Shores at North 87th Street. Crossing the Biscayne Canal, Miami Shores becomes North Miami. In North Miami, it intersects SR 922, leading to the Broad Causeway and SR 916. In North Miami Beach, it intersects SR 826 and SR 860. The road enters Aventura at Greynolds Park. It continues north-northeast through the city of Aventura, curving due north at North 187th Street and northeast at North 203rd Street. In Aventura, it intersects SR 856 at the southwest of Aventura Mall, and, after intersecting the former SR 854, it leaves Miami-Dade County.

=== Broward County ===
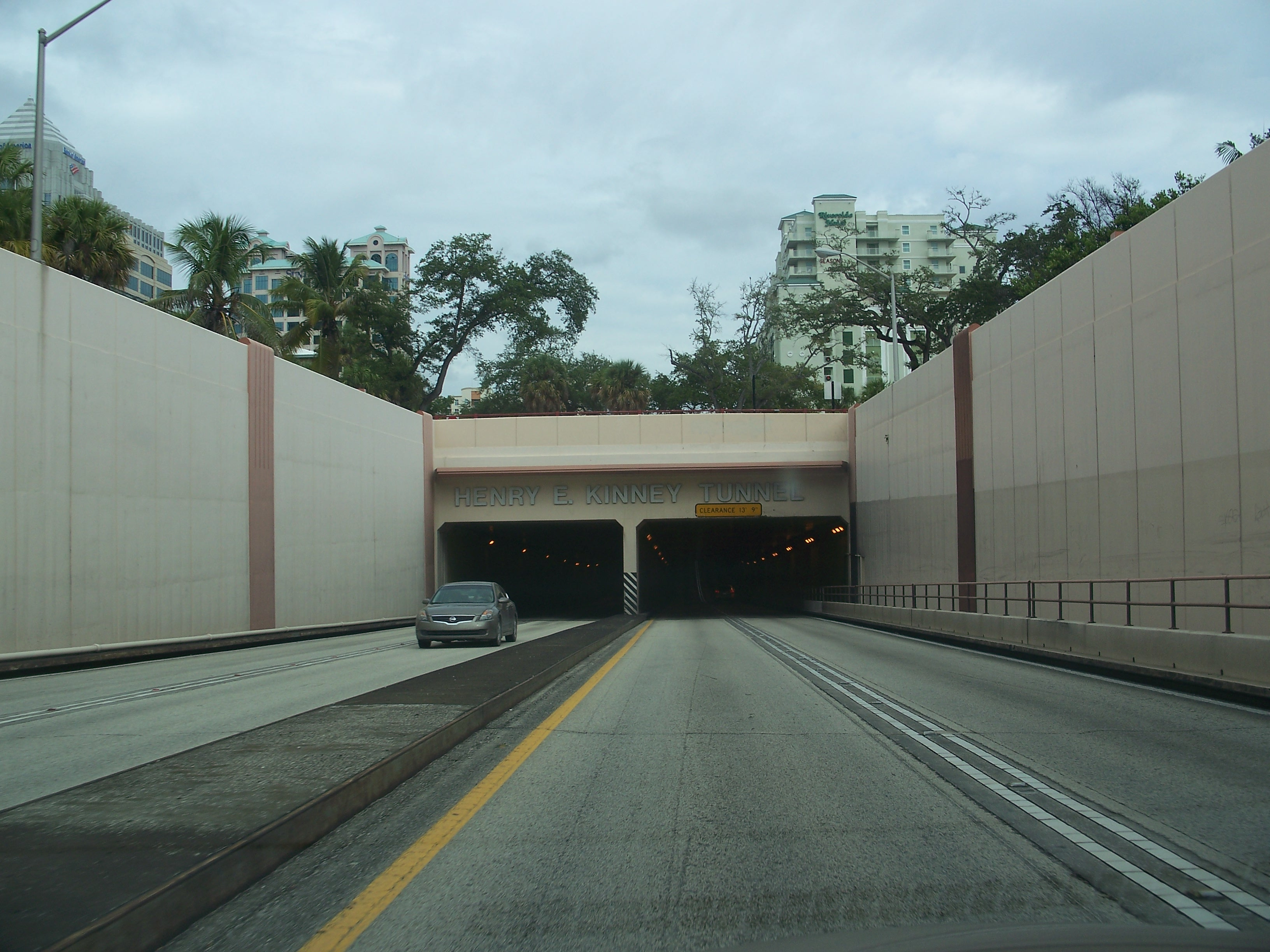
New River Tunnel, going north

Entering Broward County near Hallandale Beach, US 1 first intersects SR 858. Next it meets the eastern terminus of SR 824, which provides access to Miramar and Pembroke Pines. Entering Hollywood, US 1 intersects SR 820 in a traffic circle around Anniversary Park. In Dania Beach, it meets SR 822 and SR 848. Here SR A1A also begins running concurrently with the road just south of Fort Lauderdale–Hollywood International Airport for a few miles. Near the southeastern corner of the airport, US 1 meets the eastern terminus of SR 818. It then proceeds to run around the eastern edge of the airport. On the northeastern corner, US 1 meets I-595. Now in Fort Lauderdale as Federal Highway, it intersects the eastern terminus of SR 84. Another half mile (0.80 km) beyond, SR A1A ends its concurrency with US 1 and returns to the barrier island. One mile (1.6 km) south of downtown, it meets the eastern terminus of SR 736. The road enters downtown Fort Lauderdale via the New River Tunnel, one of only a few underwater road tunnels in the state (the other on a state road being the Port Miami Tunnel). The next major intersection is with SR 842. US 1 then turns east for one mile (1.6 km) in concurrency with SR 838 before separating again and turning north (The Galleria at Fort Lauderdale is located near this intersection). The last two major intersections in Fort Lauderdale are with SR 816 and SR 870. US 1 then enters Pompano Beach. As it makes its way through Pompano Beach, it intersects SR 814. It then passes by Pompano Beach Airpark, the Pompano Beach Golf Club, and Pompano Citi Centre at the intersection of Copans Road. The road then proceeds to enter Deerfield Beach, where it meets Southeast 10th Street (SR 869) and SR 810. US 1 then crosses the Hillsboro Canal and exits Deerfield Beach and Broward County.

=== Palm Beach County ===
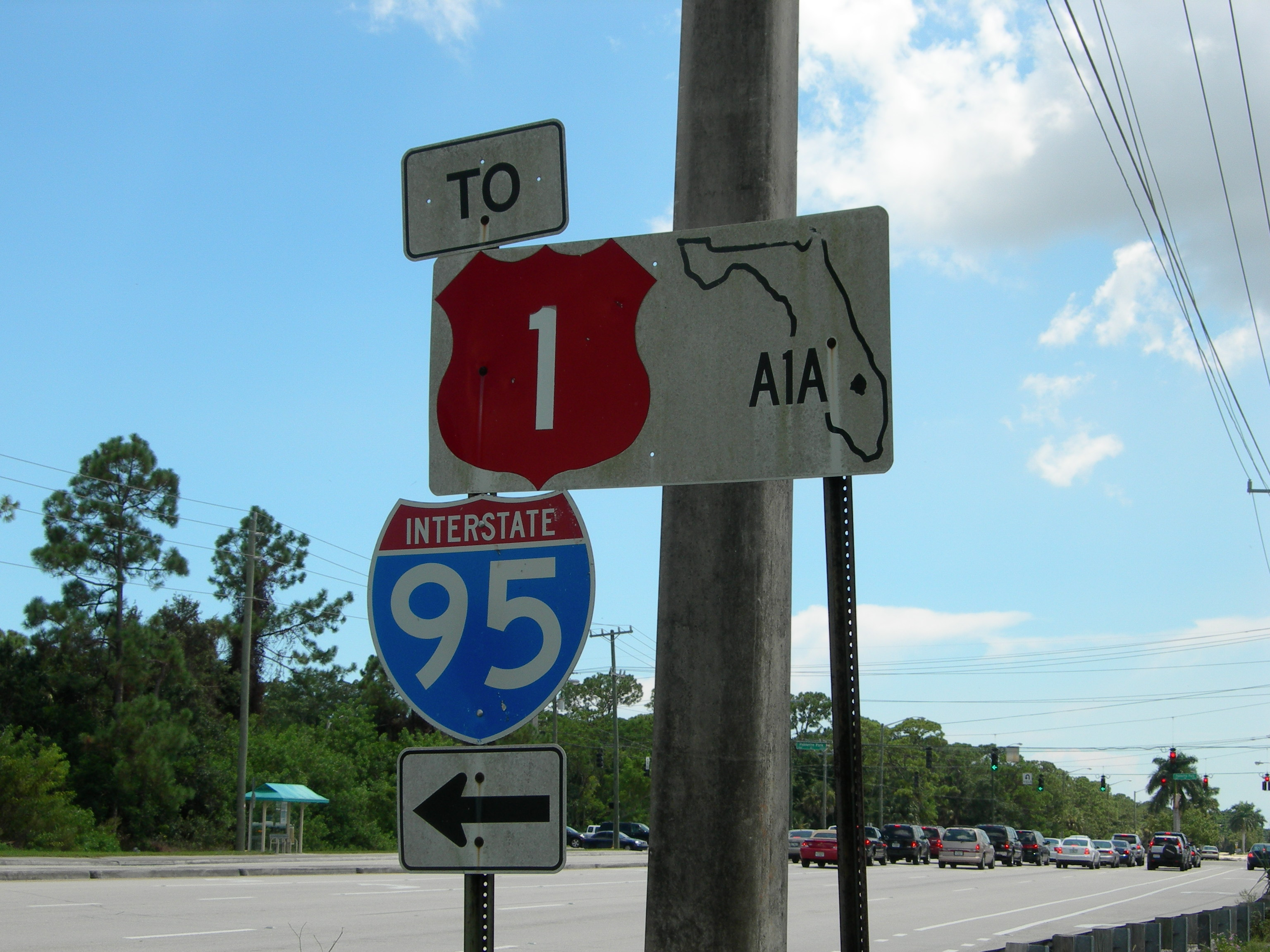
One of the last remaining colored-shield US 1 signs on South Military Trail in Boca Raton

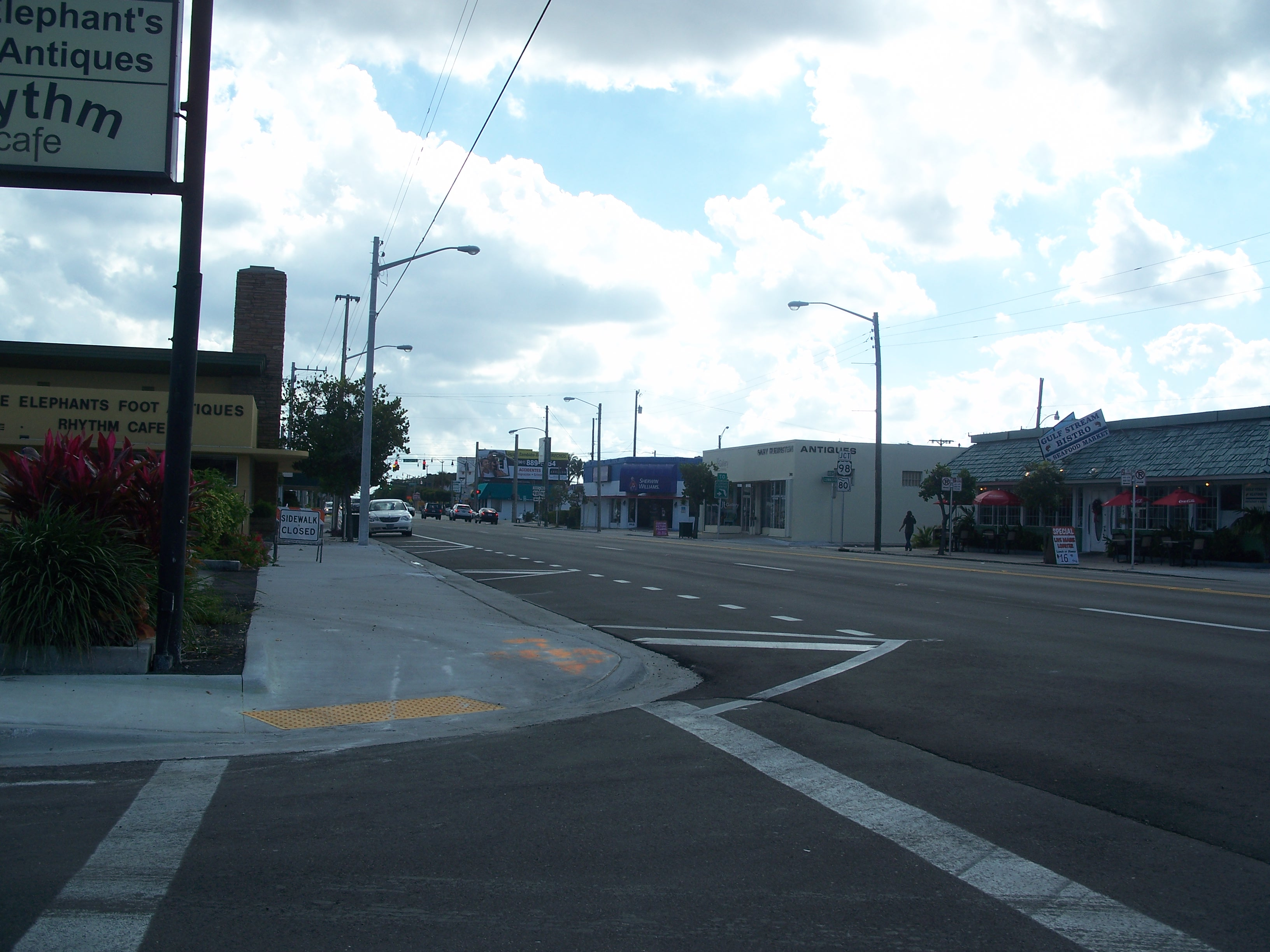
US 1 looking south just north of US 98/SR 80

As US 1 enters Palm Beach County and Boca Raton, it forms the western boundary to Royal Palm Yacht and Country Club, meeting with the northern terminus of the southern section of SR 811. It passes through the heart of Boca Raton, becoming a divided road with three lanes each, becoming the eastern terminus of SR 808, intersecting SR 800, and becoming the eastern terminus of SR 794. US 1 then enters Delray Beach, becoming a one-way pair just north of Linton Boulevard, and meets SR 806 in central Delray Beach. US 1 becomes a divided highway again, entering Boynton Beach, SR 804 runs concurrent for two blocks, providing access to local beaches at Ocean Ridge via the Intracoastal Waterway. At the city limits of Lake Worth Beach and Lantana, just north of Lantana Road, US 1's hidden designation, SR 5, splits and runs parallel to US 1 a few blocks to the east. In central Lake Worth, US 1 intersects SR 802. Entering West Palm Beach, it first intersects SR 882, followed by US 98/SR 80.

At Belvedere Road, it meets the northern end of SR 5. In central West Palm Beach, it intersects SR 704, where US 1 becomes a one-way pair through the heart of West Palm Beach. A mile (1.6 km) north of SR 704, SR A1A begins running concurrent with US 1. At Palm Beach Lakes Boulevard, the one-way pair ends for US 1, continuing north for 11 blocks, until it hits 25th Street, traveling on it for four blocks, as US 1 moves two blocks west as it moves north. US 1 leaves West Palm Beach and enters Riviera Beach via a bridge over the Port of Palm Beach. In Riviera Beach, US 1's concurrency with SR A1A ends at SR 708. In North Palm Beach, it meets the eastern terminus of SR 850 and SR 786, where SR A1A becomes concurrent with US 1 for about 1.25 miles (2.01 km) before splitting off at the southern end of Juno Beach. In Jupiter, it intersects SR 706 and has another concurrency with SR A1A just south of the Jupiter Inlet. Entering Tequesta at the northern end of the inlet, US 1 then meets up with the northern terminus of the northern portion of SR 811 and leaves Palm Beach County north of County Line Road.

=== Treasure Coast ===
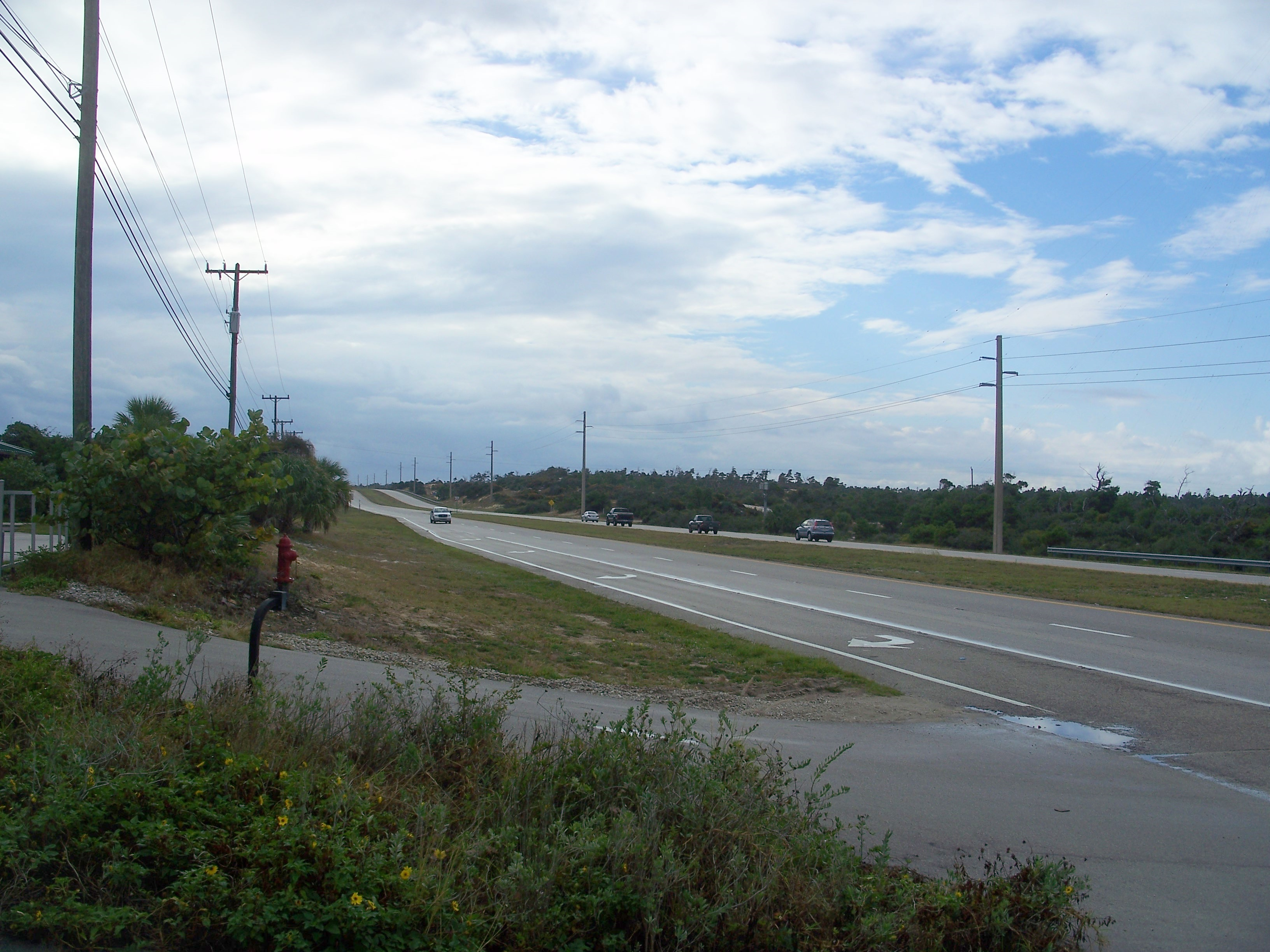
US 1 looking south from the entrance to the Hobe Sound National Wildlife Refuge

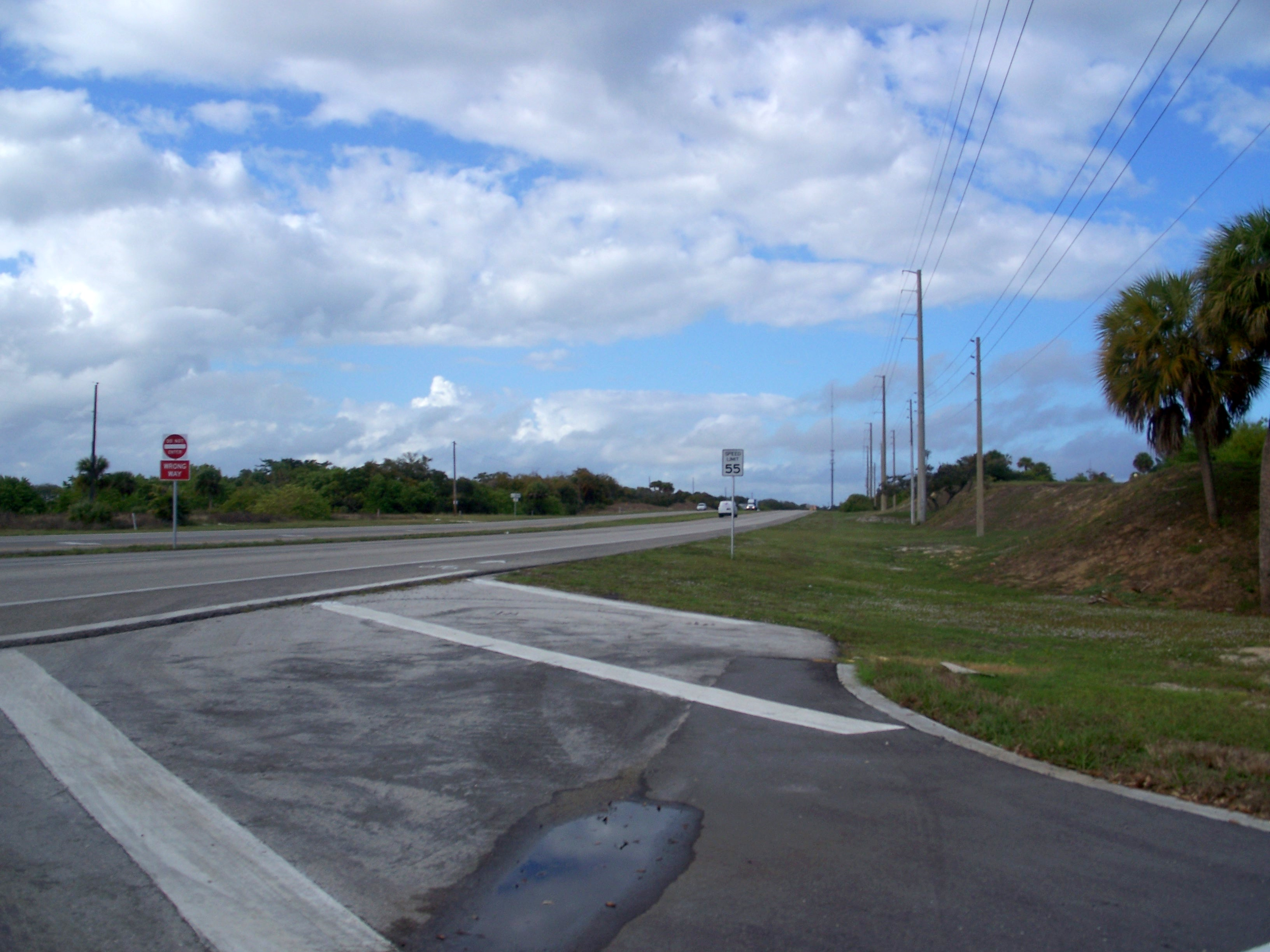
US 1 looking north from the Harbor Branch Oceanographic Institute entrance

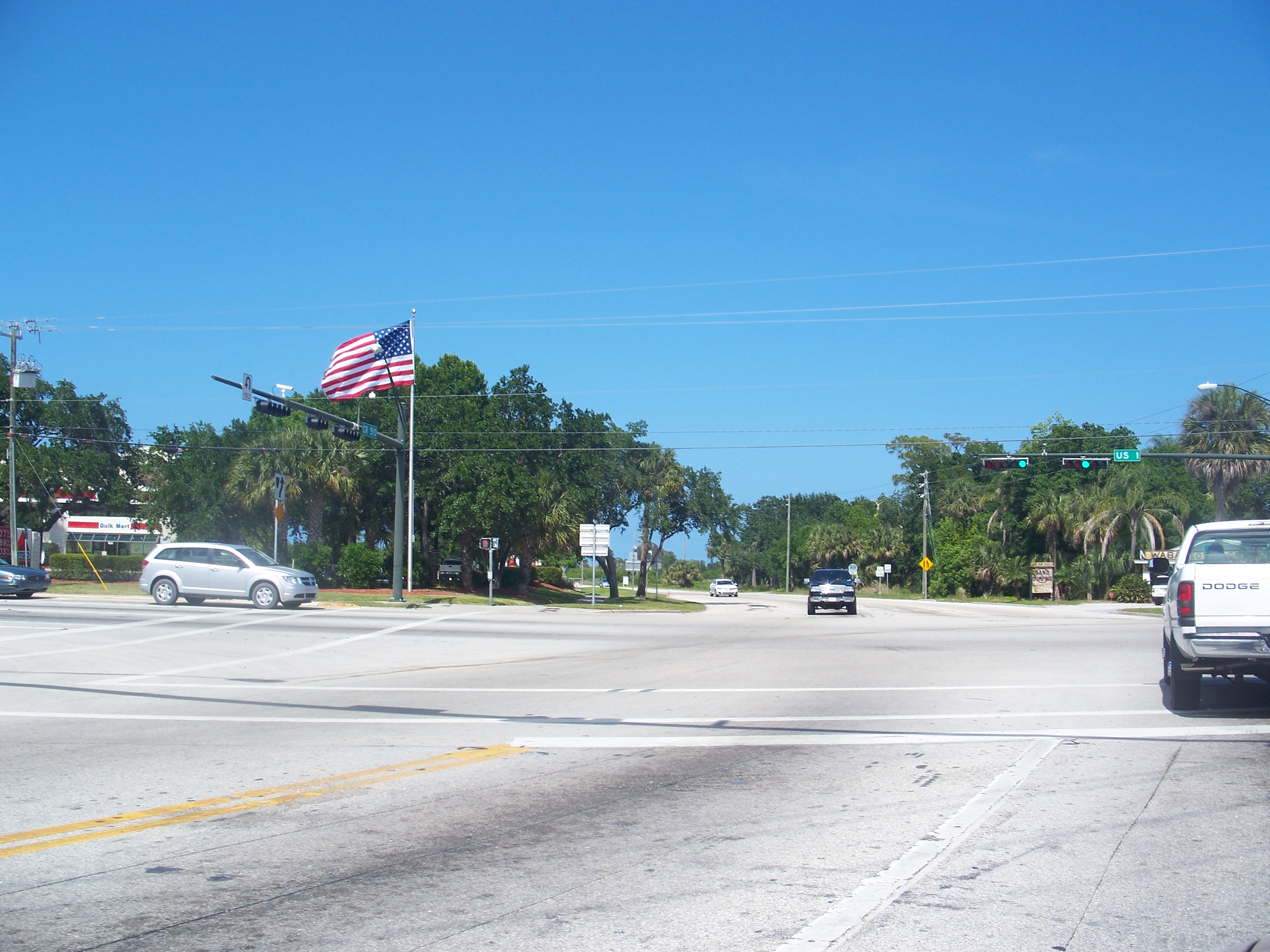
Intersection of CR 510 and US 1, in Wabasso

As US 1 makes its way into Martin County, it passes through Jonathan Dickinson State Park before crossing over the Florida East Coast Railway tracks. At the southern end of Hobe Sound, SR A1A splits off onto its own route. The two roads parallel each other until Stuart. Through the center of Hobe Sound, it intersects CR 708. It then leaves Hobe Sound and enters Port Salerno before it enters the heart Stuart, where it intersects SR 714 near SR 714's eastern terminus at the northwestern end of Witham Field. SR 714 ends less than a mile (1.6 km) east at SR A1A. Through the center of Stuart, it meets SR 76. US 1 then crosses a bridge over the St. Lucie River. North of the bridge, it crosses over the Florida East Coast Railway tracks again and meets CR 707. Two miles (3.2 km) north of the river, it leaves Stuart and enters Jensen Beach, intersecting Jensen Beach Boulevard and passing by Treasure Coast Square. One and a half miles (2.4 km) north of Treasure Coast Square, US 1 leaves Martin County.

As US 1 enters St. Lucie County and Port St. Lucie, it first meets the eastern terminus of Port St. Lucie Boulevard (PSL Boulevard; SR 716). Further north, Crosstown Parkway (westbound) and Village Green Drive (eastbound) intersect with US 1 approximately halfway between Prima Vista Boulevard and PSL Boulevard; along with Prima Vista Boulevard, Crosstown Parkway provides Port St. Lucie with a much needed second, higher-capacity direct connection between US 1 and I-95. Continuing north into White City it intersects CR 712 (Midway Road). In Fort Pierce, it meets the eastern terminus of SR 70 and, a few miles to the north, SR 68. A one-mile-long (1.6 km) concurrency with SR A1A begins a few blocks north of SR 68 as the two roads enter St. Lucie Village. After SR A1A diverges back to its own route to the beach, US 1 meets the southern terminus of SR 608. As it continues north, it meets the eastern terminus of SR 615, SR 614, as well as SR 713. North of SR 713, US 1 veers east, crosses the Florida East Coast Railway tracks, and leaves St. Lucie County.

US 1 enters Indian River County just north of the SR 713 intersection, with its first major intersection in the county being CR 606 in Oslo. US 1 then runs parallel with the Florida East Coast Railroad, entering central Vero Beach, where it is locally known as Commerce Boulevard. It intersects SR 656 (16th Street/17th Street) and SR 60 (20th Street) and passes by the eastern end of Vero Beach Regional Airport. North of Vero Beach, US 1 travels through the villages of Gifford and Winter Beach. In Wabasso, US 1 intersects SR 510, where US 1 begins a concurrency with the Indian River Lagoon Scenic Highway. US 1 then intersects with SR 605 one block north of SR 510. US 1 then travels north to central Sebastian, where it intersects with CR 512 (Sebastian Boulevard), providing access to Fellsmere and I-95. It then enters Roseland, intersecting CR 505 a half mile (0.80 km) south of US 1's crossing of the St. Sebastian River, where it leaves Indian River County and enters Brevard County and Central Florida.

=== Brevard County ===
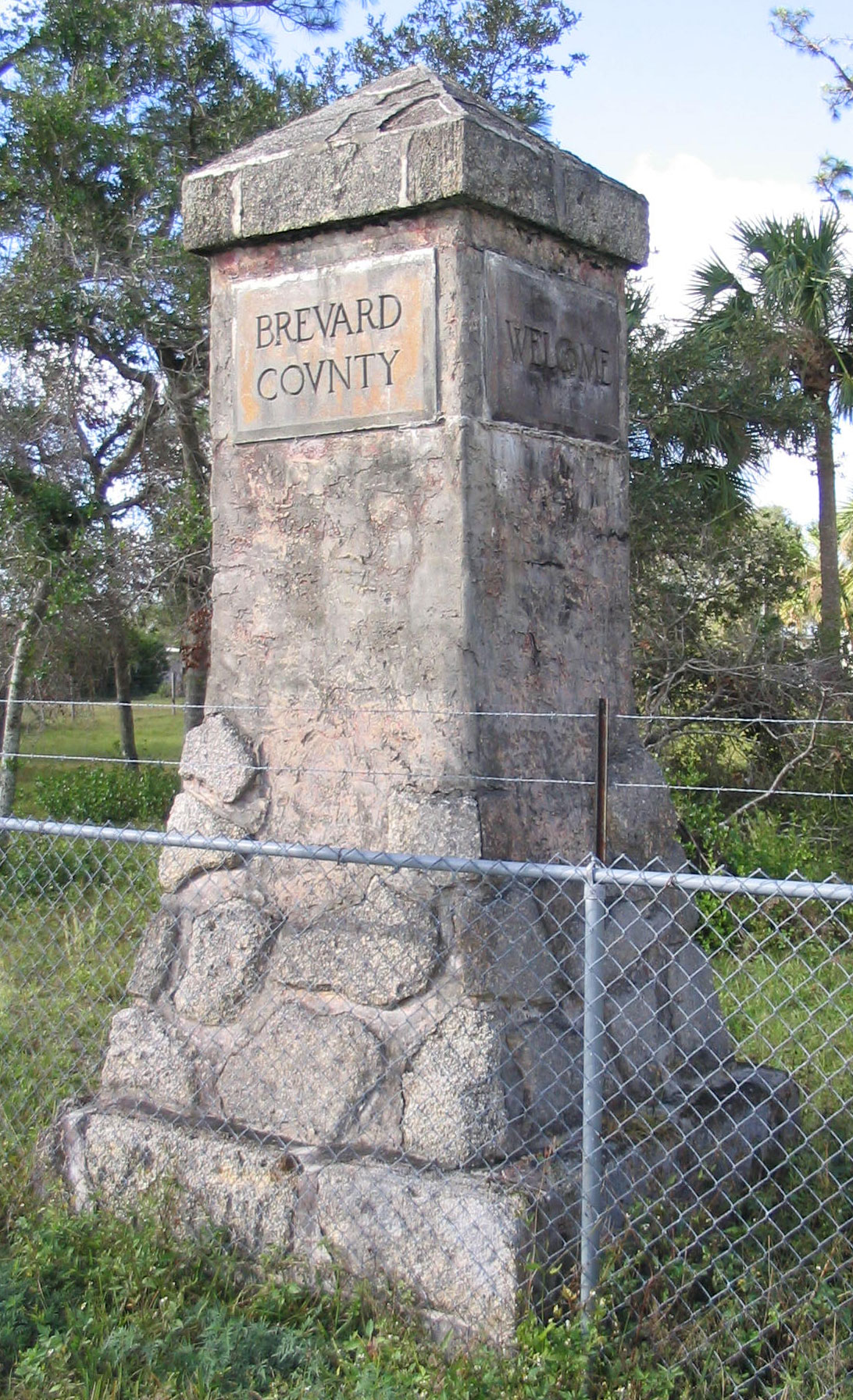
Brevard–Volusia county line near Scottsmoor

US 1 enters Brevard County at the north end of the St. Sebastian River, continuing to hug the western shoreline of the Indian River. The first community it enters is Grant-Valkaria, with intersections with Micco Road, followed by Valkaria Road just east of Valkaria Airport. US 1 then travels north to Malabar, intersecting SR 514. It continues north to Palm Bay, through the central area of the city, with an intersection of CR 516 (Palm Bay Road). It is locally designated the Johnson-Grogan Highway from South Palm Bay city limits to the Melbourne city limits. As US 1 enters Melbourne, the road veers a few blocks west of the Indian River, heading toward an intersection of US 192 at the 1900 Building. A few blocks north, US 1 returns to the shoreline of the Indian River and then intersects SR 508, followed by SR 507, with US 1 veering away from the Indian River and crossing the Elbow Creek Bridge.

In 2016, an average of 52,460 vehicles daily transited US 1 between Sarno Road and Eau Gallie Boulevard.

Just north of the Elbow Creek Bridge, it enters the Eau Gallie portion of Melbourne and intersects SR 518. It then enters Palm Shores, another portion of Melbourne, leaving it just south of SR 404, the Pineda Causeway. The community of Pineda is 1.8 miles (2.9 km) north of the intersection.

In Rockledge, US 1 intersects with CR 515 and the Indian River Lagoon Scenic Highway follows that road for 14 miles (23 km), as US 1 stays a few blocks west of the river. North of Rockledge, it enters Cocoa, running through Historic Cocoa Village on the west side and intersecting SR 520. North of Cocoa, it intersects SR 528, the lone expressway US 1 crosses in Brevard County. In Brentwood Heights, US 1 intersects CR 515 again, with US 1 resuming its status as the Indian River Lagoon Scenic Highway. US 1 continues north to Titusville, first intersecting with SR 405, with east SR 405 leading to NASA Causeway and the main entrance of the Kennedy Space Center in Merritt Island. Still in Titusville, it intersects SR 50. Now in central Titusville, US 1 intersects SR 405 again and SR 406, where the Indian River Lagoon Scenic Highway ends on US 1 and proceeds onto east SR 406. North of Titusville, US 1 steers away from the Indian River and travels in a parallel direction with I-95 from here to the Volusia County line. US 1 continues past Titusville into Mims, passing by Cape Canaveral National Cemetery. It then continues to Scottsmoor, just south of the Volusia County line, where it intersects CR 5A, a one-mile (1.6 km) spur route of the road itself.

=== Volusia County ===
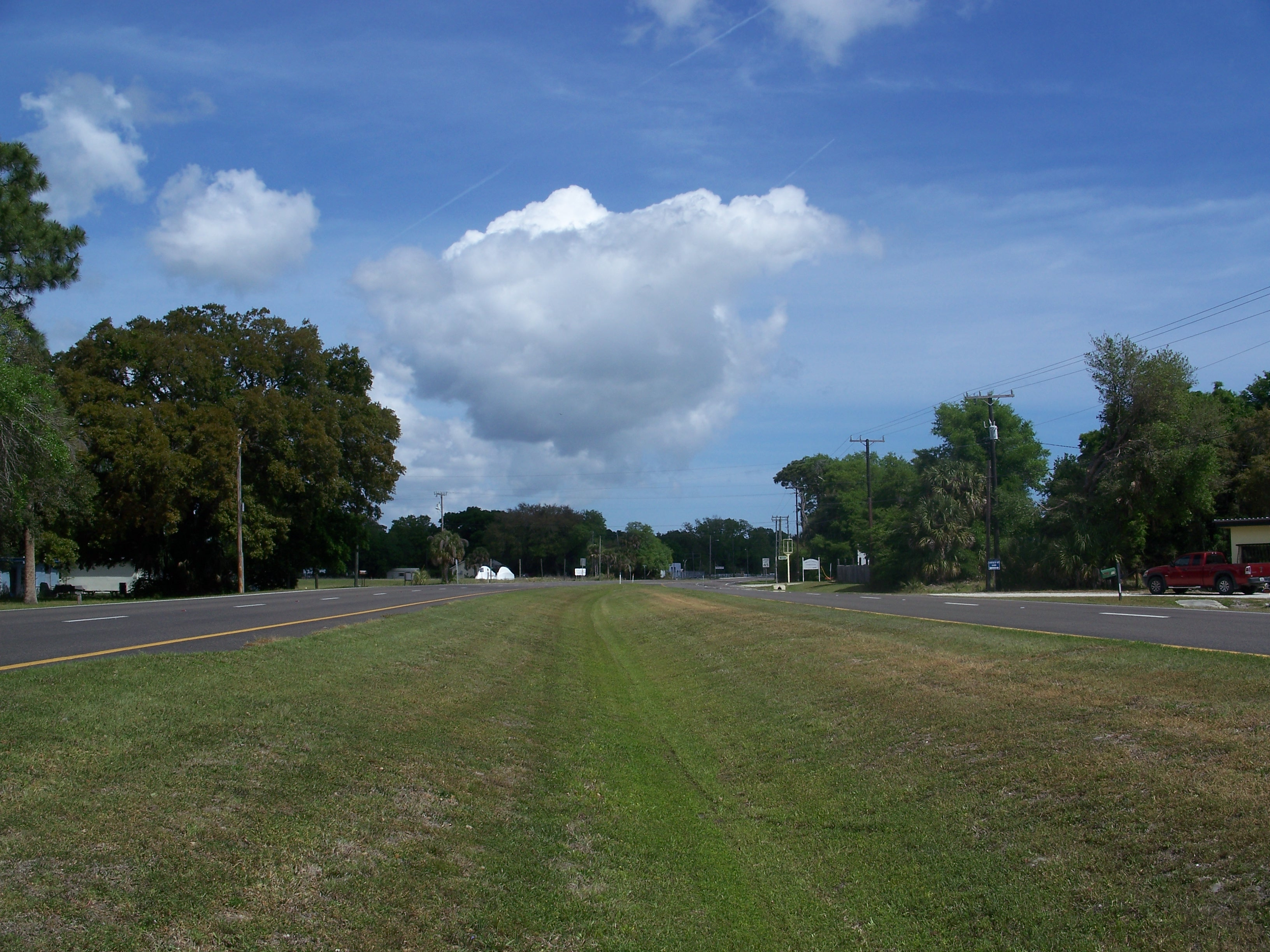
US 1 looking north from the median in Oak Hill

The road enters Volusia County just north of Scottsmoor, where US 1 branches away from I-95 and in a northeast direction toward the coast. At the intersection of SR 3 in Oak Hill, US 1 turns north, aligned with the coast. US 1 continues through central Oak Hill, intersecting CR 4164. US 1 then continues north to Edgewater, where it meets with SR 442, and meets with CR 4136 (Park Avenue) before leaving Edgewater. In New Smyrna Beach, it crosses under SR 44 and CR A1A, starting another concurrency with SR A1A. It continues through central New Smyrna Beach, passing by New Smyrna Beach Municipal Airport and leaving the town via a crossing of Spruce Creek and Rose Bay entering Allandale. A few blocks north of the creek, US 1 intersects SR 5A, a bypass running north to Ormond Beach. Now in Port Orange, US 1 runs through the core of the town, intersecting SR 421/SR A1A, ending another concurrency with SR A1A. SR A1A connects to the barrier island via the Port Orange Causeway.

US 1 then enters South Daytona, with intersections with Reed Canal Road and Big Tree Road. It then enters Daytona Beach, locally known as Ridgewood Avenue as it runs through the central part of the town. US 1's journey through Daytona Beach begins with an intersection with SR 400, which will become unsigned on I-4 west of I-95. Through Daytona Beach, US 1 provides access to four bridges crossing to the barrier island; the Memorial Bridge, followed by the Carlton Blank Bridge, which carries US 92, the Main Street Bridge and the Seabreeze Bridge. It crosses SR 430 before leaving Daytona Beach and entering Holly Hill. In Holly Hill, it intersects CR 4019 (LPGA Boulevard/11th Street), which is home to the LPGA headquarters.

It then enters the city of Ormond Beach, where US 1 is known and Younge Street, intersecting SR 40 and running parallel with CR 4079. As US 1 heads northwest, it then intersects SR 5A, the northern end of the bypass. It then crosses the Tomoka River before leaving Ormond Beach. A few miles northwest, it then meets I-95, passing through some hotels and fast-food restaurants as it crosses under the Interstate. US 1 leaves Volusia County west of I-95.

=== Flagler County ===
US 1 runs west of I-95 throughout its journey in Flagler County, running in a northwest direction. The first major intersection in the county is with Old Dixie Highway in Korona. From there, it enters Dupoint, intersecting CR 304, followed by Belle Terre Parkway. It then enters Bunnell, where it's known as State Street, with an intersection of SR 11/SR 100, with a brief concurrency with SR 100. The SR 100 concurrency ends with an intersection with SR 20/SR 100. North of Bunnell, US 1 intersects Old Dixie Highway (CR 13). US 1 then straddles the western end of Palm Coast, with an intersection with Palm Coast Parkway (CR 1424) near the northern end of the city, providing access to I-95. Before leaving Palm Coast, it intersects Old Kings Road and then leaves Flagler County via a crossing of the Pellicer Creek bridge.

=== St. Johns County ===
US 1 enters St. Johns County at the northern end of Pellicer Creek and quickly intersects with CR 204 just south of the I-95 interchange. At the I-95 interchange, US 1 stays east of the Interstate and heads into an undeveloped area, which includes the Matanzas State Forest. At SR 206, the road is slightly more developed, as US 1 heads toward St. Augustine Shores, followed by St. Augustine South at the crossing of Moultrie Creek. It then enters St. Augustine, first intersecting with SR 312, followed by SR 207, where US 1 is now known as Ponce De Leon Boulevard. Heading north, it intersects US 1 Business (US 1 Bus.), known locally as King Street, and a tourist route through old St. Augustine. Just north of the intersection, it crosses the San Sebastian River and then straddles on the eastern riverbed. At the northern end of St. Augustine, it intersects SR 16, followed by US 1 Bus. five blocks later. After leaving St. Augustine, it passes by the western end of Northeast Florida Regional Airport and cuts through wetlands to Durbin. At the northernmost intersection with CR 210 at Race Track Road, US 1 crosses the Duval County line and enters Jacksonville.

=== Duval County ===
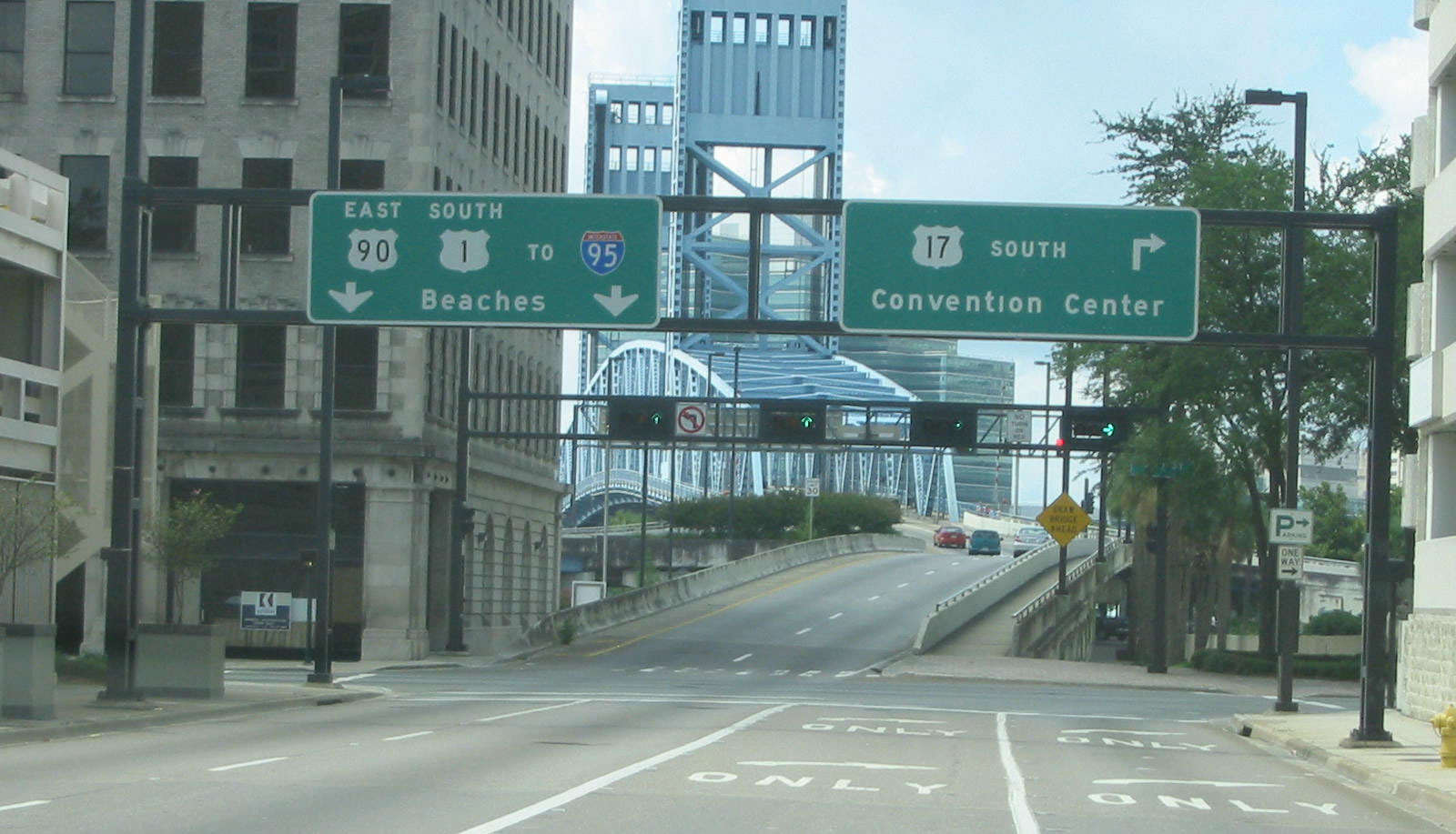
Main Street Bridge from Downtown Jacksonville

From St. Johns County, US 1 starts its journey through Duval County and Jacksonville at Race Track Road, where it becomes the Philips Highway, a 17-mile-long (27 km) section of US 1 south of Downtown Jacksonville named after Judge Henry Bethune Philips, the first chair of the State Road Department, predecessor of FDOT. It heads north through the sparsely developed sections of southeast Jacksonville, intersecting the future I-795 (SR 9B) interchange, followed by Old St. Augustine Road in Bayard. It continues northwest, intersecting Greenland Road and the I-295 east beltway. North of I-295, US 1 enters a commercial area with multiple furniture stores, with an intersection with SR 115. A half mile (0.80 km) northwest is an interchange with I-95. The Avenues is located in between these major intersections.

A few miles north, US 1 intersects Sunbeam Road (CR 116), which connects to SR 13. It then heads to SR 152, locally known as Baymeadows Road. As US 1 heads toward the heart of Jacksonville, it intersects with SR 202, locally known as JTB Boulevard, a freeway through eastern Jacksonville. US 1 then heads toward Bowden Road, providing access to southbound I-95, followed one block later by SR 109, locally known as University Boulevard. A few miles north, it intersects Emerson Street, signed as US 1 Alt. to the east and SR 126 to the west. It then intersects St. Augustine Road and Philips Highway ends at I-95 exit 348.

North of Philips Highway, US 1 continues as Kings Avenue, running within a block of I-95. One block north of I-95, it intersects US 90 and starts a concurrency as the two highways head north. After crossing under I-95, the road intersects SR 13 twice, heading toward the Main Street Bridge, crossing the St. Johns River. North of the bridge, the road becomes a one-way pair, named Ocean Street northbound and Main Street southbound. It then intersects SR 228, starting a concurrency. Several blocks north, it ends the US 90 concurrency and begins a concurrency with US 90 Alt. It then intersects with SR 115 and the national southern terminus of US 23. It also ends the concurrencies of US 90 Alt. and SR 228. It also starts a concurrency with US 17. At that point, the one-way pair ends, and US 1 leaves downtown as Main Street. It then intersects US 1 Alt., and the road heads west on the Martin Luther King Jr. Parkway, ending the concurrency with US 17, which heads north. At this point, US 1 changes its unsigned state road from SR 5 to SR 15.

US 1 then intersects I-95 one last time on a cloverleaf interchange on exit 354A; the two highways will not meet again until Virginia. US 1 continues west, with the parkway ending with an intersection of US 23, which US 1 shares a concurrency with from here to the Georgia state line. The road continues northwest, intersecting SR 111 and crossing the Ribault River just north of that intersection. US 1 then intersects SR 115A. Just south of the I-295 west beltway, it passes west of the Little Trout River. It then has an interchange with the I-295 west beltway, followed by an intersection with Trout River Boulevard. US 1 then crosses the Trout River, a tributary of the St. Johns River, and intersects SR 104 immediately north of the river. The road then heads toward the Thomas Creek Conversation Area, leaving Duval County at the Thomas Creek Bridge.

=== Nassau County ===
North of the Thomas Creek Conservation Area, it enters Nassau County and Nassau Village-Ratliff. It next heads to Callahan, where it intersects with SR 115. At the center part of town, it intersects the northern terminus of SR A1A and SR 200, as well as starting a concurrency with US 301 that continues beyond the Georgia state line. Just north of Callahan, US 1 intersects CR 115. US 1 heads north toward Hilliard, which contains an intersection with CR 108. Heading north toward Georgia, it passes a combined truck weigh station and agricultural inspection station in the median. Entering Boulogne, it passes by the site of a former welcome center on the southbound side followed by an intersection with CR 121/Lake Hampton Road, the last intersection before US 1 crosses the St. Marys River and the Georgia state line.

== History ==
Historical US 1 route markers

1926 design

1948 design

1956–1993, red highway shields

Modern design

US 1 was designated nationwide on November 11, 1926, running from Miami, Florida, north to Fort Kent, Maine. The label was generally applied to the Atlantic Highway, except between Jacksonville, Florida, and Augusta, Georgia, where a more inland route was chosen. In Florida, US 1 was designated along the full length of SR 4. South of Jacksonville, this was both the Atlantic Highway and the eastern division of the Dixie Highway; the route from Jacksonville northwest into Georgia was a Jacksonville–Macon, Georgia, Dixie Highway connector.

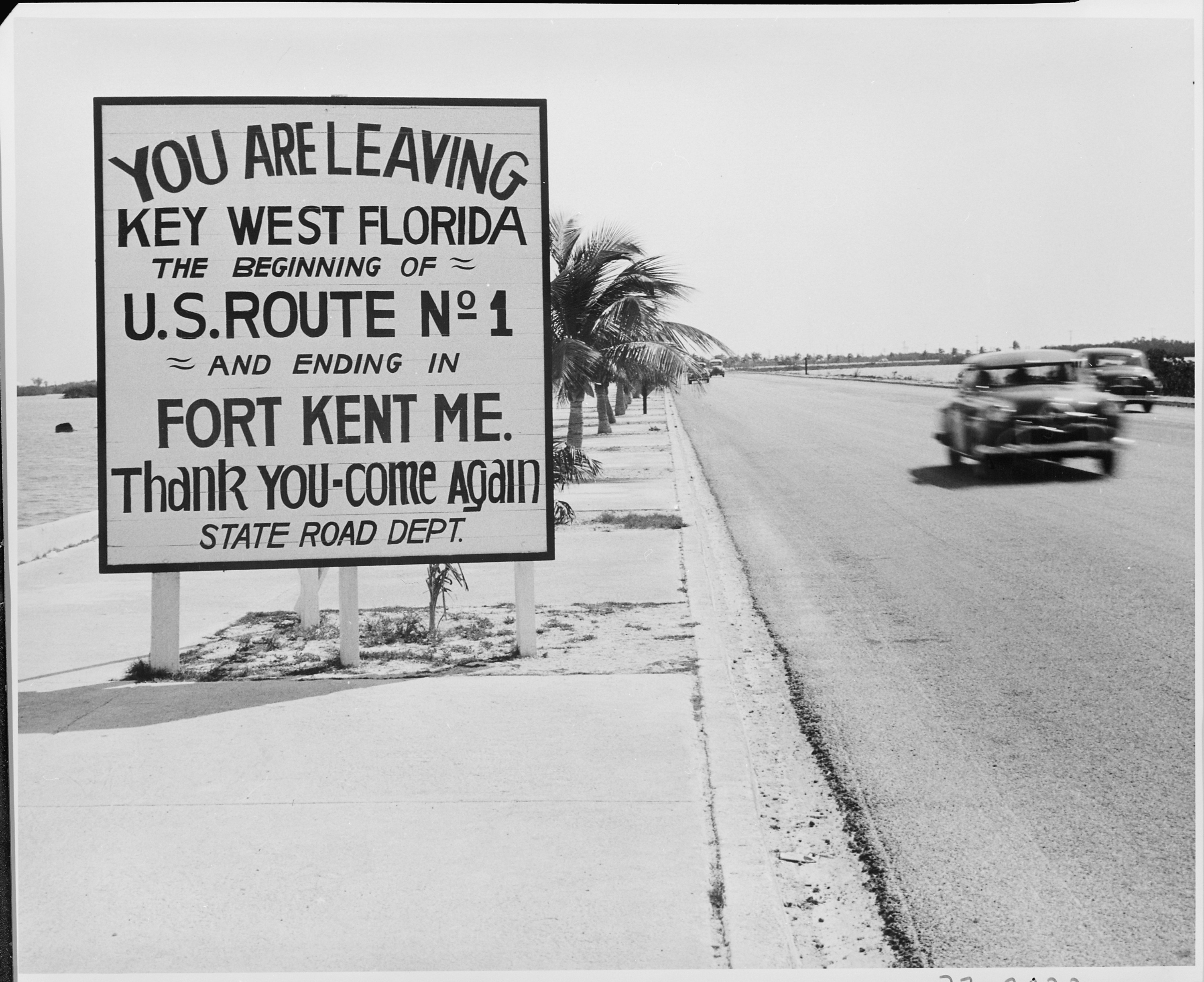
US 1 in Key West, March 1951

With the Overseas Highway completed in 1938, US 1 was extended from Miami over the Overseas Highway (SR 4A) to Key West shortly afterward, where it still ends today.

The section of US 1 between Miami and Jacksonville has been replaced by I-95 for most through traffic.

In Florida, where signs for U.S. Highways formerly had different colors for each highway, the "shield" for US 1 was red. Florida began using the colored shields in 1956, but, during the 1980s, the Manual on Uniform Traffic Control Devices was revised to specify only a black and white color scheme for U.S. Highway shields. As such, federal funds were no longer available to maintain the colored signs. On August 27, 1993, the decision was made to no longer produce colored signs. Since then, the remaining colored signs have been replaced gradually by black-and-white signs.

== Major intersections ==
County	Location	mi	km	Destinations	Notes
Monroe	Key West	0.000	0.000	Fleming Street	Southern terminus; road continues north as Whitehead Street
Monroe	Key West	3.927	6.320	SR A1A south (Roosevelt Boulevard) – Key West International Airport, Beaches	Northern terminus of Key West segment of SR A1A
Monroe	Boca Chica Key	8.08	13.00	Naval Air Station Key West	Interchange
Monroe	East Rockland Key	9.183	14.779	Rockland Drive – NAS Truck Entrance	Former US 1 south
Monroe	Big Coppitt Key	10.691	17.205	CR 941 south / Boca Chica Road	Northern terminus of CR 941 (former SR 941)
Monroe	Lower Sugarloaf Key	16.955	27.286	CR 939 south / Sugarloaf Boulevard	Northern terminus of CR 939 (former SR 939)
Monroe	Sugarloaf Key	19.970	32.139	CR 939B south	Northern terminus of CR 939 (former SR 939)
Monroe	Summerland Key	25.197	40.551	CR 942 south / East Shore Drive	Northern terminus of CR 942 (former SR 942)
Monroe	Big Pine Key	30.527	49.128	CR 940 north / Key Deer Boulevard – National Key Deer Visitor Center	Southern terminus of CR 940 (former SR 940)
Monroe	Bahia Honda Channel	35.272– 36.544	56.765– 58.812	Bahia Honda Bridge	
Monroe	Moser Channel	40.011– 46.804	64.391– 75.324	Seven Mile Bridge	
Monroe	Marathon	48.059	77.343	CR 931 north (20th Street)	Southern terminus of CR 931 (former SR 931)
Monroe	Marathon	49.965	80.411	CR 931 south / Sombrero Beach Road – Sombrero Beach	Northern terminus of CR 931 (former SR 931)
Monroe	Long Key Channel	63.140– 65.446	101.614– 105.325	Long Key Bridge	
Monroe	Islamorada	84.344	135.739	CR 905 north	Former SR 4A; southern terminus of CR 905
Monroe	Islamorada	85.578– 85.739	137.724– 137.984	Snake Creek Bridge over Snake Creek	
Monroe	Key Largo	106.312	171.093	CR 905 north (Card Sound Road) – Miami	Former SR 4A east; southern terminus of CR 905 (former SR 905)
Monroe	Key Largo	107.320	172.715	Yacht Club Drive (SR 5S north)	Interchange
Monroe	Cross Key	108.248	174.208	Gilberts Resort Drive (SR 5S south)	Interchange
Miami-Dade	Florida City	126.514	203.605	Card Sound Road south (CR 905A south) – Upper Key Largo	Former SR 4A west; northern terminus of CR 905A (former SR 905A)
Miami-Dade	Florida City	126.636	203.801	Krome Avenue north (CR 997 north)	Former SR 997 north; former US 1 Bus. / SR 5A
Miami-Dade	Florida City	127.376	204.992	SR 9336 west (Palm Drive) – Everglades Park, Biscayne Park	Eastern terminus of SR 9336
Miami-Dade	Florida City	127.783	205.647	Florida's Turnpike Extension north (SR 821) – Orlando, Airport	Southern terminus of Turnpike; exit 1 (Turnpike)
Miami-Dade	Homestead			SR 998 west (Campbell Drive / Southwest 312th Street) to Florida's Turnpike Extension – Miami-Dade College	Eastern terminus of SR 998
Miami-Dade	Homestead	130.048	209.292	Flagler Avenue south	Former US 1 Bus. / SR 5A south
Miami-Dade	Cutler Bay	138.528	222.939	SR 989 south (Allapattah Road) to Florida's Turnpike	Northern terminus of SR 989
Miami-Dade	Cutler Bay			Caribbean Boulevard to Florida's Turnpike Extension south	Exit 12 (Turnpike)
Miami-Dade	Cutler Bay	139.124	223.898	Florida's Turnpike Extension north (SR 821)	Northbound access only; exit 12 (Turnpike)
Miami-Dade	Cutler Bay	140.310	225.807	SR 994 west (Quail Roost Drive)	Eastern terminus of SR 994
Miami-Dade	Palmetto Bay	142.780	229.782	SR 992 west (Coral Reef Drive) to Florida's Turnpike Extension	Eastern terminus of SR 992
Miami-Dade	Pinecrest	144.123	231.943	SR 973 north (SW 132nd Street)	Southern terminus of SR 973
Miami-Dade	Pinecrest	145.585	234.296	SR 990 west (Killian Drive)	Eastern terminus of SR 990
Miami-Dade	Pinecrest	146.79	236.24	SR 826 north to SR 94 (Kendall Drive)	Interchange; northbound exit and southbound entrance
Miami-Dade	Pinecrest	147.396	237.211	SR 94 west (Kendall Drive)	Eastern terminus of SR 94; no left turn northbound
Miami-Dade		147.850	237.942	SR 878 west to SR 874 / Florida's Turnpike south	No left turn northbound; eastern terminus of SR 878
Miami-Dade	South Miami	148.984	239.767	SR 986 west (Sunset Drive)	Eastern terminus of SR 986
Miami-Dade	South Miami–Coral Gables line	149.307	240.286	SR 959 north (Red Road) – University of Miami	Southern terminus of SR 959
Miami-Dade	Coral Gables	151.300	243.494	SR 953 north (Le Jeune Road)	Southern terminus of SR 953
Miami-Dade	Miami	152.230	244.990	SR 976 west (Bird Road)	No left turn northbound; eastern terminus of SR 976
Miami-Dade	Miami	153.076	246.352	SR 9 north (Unity Boulevard) – Coconut Grove	Southern terminus of SR 9
Miami-Dade	Miami	154.849	249.205	I-95 north (SR 9A)	Interchange; northbound exit and southbound entrance; southern terminus of I-95 / SR 9A / Brickell Avenue; northern terminus of Dixie Highway; north end of state maintenance
Miami-Dade	Miami	155.32	249.96	SR 913 (Rickenbacker Causeway / Southwest 26th Road) to I-95 north – Key Biscayne	
Miami-Dade	Miami	156.1	251.2	SR 972 west (SE 13th Street / Coral Way)	Eastern terminus of SR 972
Miami-Dade	Miami	156.48	251.83	US 41 (SW 8th & 7th Streets / SR 90)	Eastern terminus of US 41; south end of state maintenance
Miami-Dade	Miami	156.55	251.94	Brickell Avenue Bridge over the Miami River	
Miami-Dade	Miami	156.801	252.347	I-95 (SR 9A) / SR 970 – Airport	Exit 2A (I-95); Eastern terminus of SR 970
Miami-Dade	Miami	157.892	254.103	NE 1st Street	Former SR 968 west
Miami-Dade	Miami	158.193	254.587	SR 886 east (Port Boulevard) – Port of Miami, Bayside	Western terminus of SR 886
Miami-Dade	Miami	158.236	254.656	NE 6th Street to I-95 – Miami International Airport	
Miami-Dade	Miami	158.65	255.32	SR A1A north / I-395 to I-95 / SR 836 west / SR 887 – Beaches, Airport, Port of Miami, Jungle Island, Miami Children's Museum, Miami Seaplane Base	Southbound access is via NE 15th Street and Bayshore Drive
Miami-Dade	Miami	158.895	255.717	NE 15th Street to SR A1A – Miami Beach	To Venetian Causeway
Miami-Dade	Miami	160.348	258.055	US 27 north (NE 36th Street / SR 25)	Southern terminus of US 27
Miami-Dade	Miami	160.41	258.15	I-195 to SR 112 west / I-95 – Miami Beach, Airport	Exit 2B (I-195)
Miami-Dade	Miami	161.392	259.735	SR 944 west (NE 54th Street)	Eastern terminus of SR 944
Miami-Dade	Miami	162.978	262.288	SR 934 east (NE 79th Street) – Miami Beach	No left turn northbound; western terminus of SR 934
Miami-Dade	Miami	163.136	262.542	SR 934 west (NE 82nd Street) to I-95	Eastern terminus of SR 934
Miami-Dade	Miami Shores	163.570	263.240	SR 915 north (NE 6th Avenue)	Southern terminus of SR 915; northbound exit and southbound entrance
Miami-Dade	North Miami	166.227	267.516	SR 922 (North Miami Boulevard) to I-95 – Bal Harbour	
Miami-Dade	North Miami	166.979	268.727	SR 916 west (Northeast 135th Street) to I-95	Eastern terminus of SR 916
Miami-Dade	North Miami–North Miami Beach line	168.834	271.712	SR 826 (North Miami Beach Boulevard) to I-95	
Miami-Dade	Aventura	170.369	274.182	SR 860 west (Miami Gardens Drive) to I-95	Eastern terminus of SR 860
Miami-Dade	Aventura	170.895	275.029	SR 856 east (William Lehman Causeway) to SR A1A – Beaches	Western terminus of SR 856
Miami-Dade	Aventura	171.482	275.974	Ives Dairy Road west to I-95	Interchange with no entrance ramps
Broward	Hallandale Beach	23.100	37.176	SR 858 (Hallandale Beach Boulevard) to I-95 / SR A1A	
Broward	Hallandale Beach–Hollywood line	173.864	279.807	SR 824 west (Pembroke Road) to Moffett Street / I-95	Eastern terminus of SR 824
Broward	Hollywood	174.9	281.5	SR 820 (Hollywood Boulevard) to SR A1A / I-95 / Florida's Turnpike / Tyler Street / Harrison Street – Beaches	Young Circle (large traffic circle around city park)
Broward	Hollywood–Dania Beach line	176.471	284.003	SR 822 (Sheridan Street) to I-95 / SR A1A	
Broward	Dania Beach	177.517	285.686	SR 848 west (Stirling Road) to I-95 / SE 2nd Street	Eastern terminus of SR 848
Broward	Dania Beach	177.753	286.066	SR A1A south (Dania Beach Boulevard) – John U. Lloyd State Park	Southern end of SR A1A concurrency
Broward	Fort Lauderdale–Hollywood– Dania Beach tripoint	178.565	287.373	SR 818 west (Griffin Road) to Taylor Road / I-95 / Florida's Turnpike	Eastern terminus of SR 818
Broward	Fort Lauderdale–Hollywood– Dania Beach tripoint	179.2	288.4	Fort Lauderdale-Hollywood International Airport	Interchange
Broward	Fort Lauderdale–Hollywood– Dania Beach tripoint	180.0	289.7	I-595 west (SR 862) to I-95 / Florida's Turnpike – Port Everglades	Eastern terminus of I-595; no southbound access to Port Everglades; exit 12 (I-595)
Broward	Fort Lauderdale	180.639	290.710	SE 6th Avenue	Former US 1 / SR 5 south
Broward	Fort Lauderdale	180.827	291.013	SR 84 west (Marina Boulevard) to Florida's Turnpike / I-595 / I-95	Eastern terminus of SR 84
Broward	Fort Lauderdale	181.344	291.845	SR A1A north (Southeast 17th Street) / CR 811 north – Beaches	Northern end of SR A1A concurrency; southern terminus of CR 811
Broward	Fort Lauderdale	181.853	292.664	SR 736 west (Davie Boulevard) to I-95	Eastern terminus of SR 736
Broward	Fort Lauderdale	182.57	293.82	New River Tunnel under the New River	
Broward	Fort Lauderdale	182.6	293.9	Las Olas Boulevard – Downtown Fort Lauderdale	Interchange; southbound exit and northbound entrance; former SR A1A Alt. east
Broward	Fort Lauderdale	182.871	294.302	SR 842 west (Broward Boulevard) to I-95	Eastern terminus of SR 842
Broward	Fort Lauderdale	183.931	296.008	SR 838 west (Sunrise Boulevard) to I-95	Southern end of SR 838 concurrency; northbound access is via NE 9th Street and Flagler Drive
Broward	Fort Lauderdale	184.839	297.470	SR 838 east (Sunrise Boulevard) to SR A1A – Beaches	Northern end of SR 838 concurrency
Broward	Fort Lauderdale–Oakland Park line	186.964	300.889	SR 816 (Oakland Park Boulevard) to SR A1A	
Broward	Oakland Park	188.616	303.548	SR 870 (Commercial Boulevard) to I-95 / Florida's Turnpike / SR 869 (Sawgrass Expressway) / SR A1A – Beaches	
Broward	Oakland Park	189.695	305.285	Bayview Drive west to I-95	
Broward	Pompano Beach	191.633	308.403	SR 814 (Atlantic Boulevard) to I-95 / Florida's Turnpike	
Broward	Pompano Beach	192.900	310.442	SR 844 east (NE 14th Street) – Beaches	Western terminus of SR 844
Broward	Pompano Beach	193.516	311.434	Copans Road to I-95	
Broward	Lighthouse Point–Pompano Beach line	194.674	313.297	SR 834 west (Sample Road) to I-95	Eastern terminus of SR 834
Broward	Deerfield Beach	196.728	316.603	SE 10th Street	To SR 869
Broward	Deerfield Beach	197.629	318.053	SR 810 (Hillsboro Boulevard) to I-95 / SR A1A – Beaches	
Palm Beach	Boca Raton	199.319	320.773	Camino Real to I-95 / SR A1A	
Palm Beach	Boca Raton	199.983	321.841	Palmetto Park Road (CR 798) to SR A1A	No left turns
Palm Beach	Boca Raton	200.486	322.651	Mizner Boulevard / NE 8th Street to I-95 / SR A1A – Beaches	
Palm Beach	Boca Raton	200.839	323.219	SR 808 west (Glades Road) to I-95 / Florida's Turnpike – Florida Atlantic University	Eastern terminus of SR 808
Palm Beach	Boca Raton	202.605	326.061	SR 800 east (Spanish River Boulevard) to SR A1A – Highland Beach	Western terminus of SR 800
Palm Beach	Boca Raton	203.186	326.996	SR 794 west (Yamato Road) to I-95	Eastern terminus of SR 794
Palm Beach	Delray Beach	206.331	332.058	Linton Boulevard (CR 782) to I-95 / SR A1A	
Palm Beach	Delray Beach	207.897	334.578	SR 806 (Atlantic Avenue) – Beach	
Palm Beach	Delray Beach	208.033	334.797	NE 1st Street (Downtown Bypass) to I-95 / Florida's Turnpike	
Palm Beach	Delray Beach	208.757	335.962	George Bush Boulevard east to SR A1A	Western terminus of George Bush Boulevard; former SR 806A
Palm Beach	Boynton Beach	211.621	340.571	Woolbright Road (CR 792) to I-95	
Palm Beach	Boynton Beach	212.484	341.960	SR 804 east (Ocean Avenue) to SR A1A – Beach	Southern end of SR 804 concurrency
Palm Beach	Boynton Beach	212.619	342.177	SR 804 west (Boynton Beach Boulevard) to I-95 / Florida's Turnpike	Northern end of SR 804 concurrency
Palm Beach	Boynton Beach	213.995	344.392	Gateway Boulevard west to I-95	Eastern terminus of Gateway Boulevard
Palm Beach	Hypoluxo–Lantana line	215.583	346.947	Hypoluxo Road west to I-95	Eastern terminus of Hypoluxo Road
Palm Beach	Lantana	216.445	348.334	Ocean Avenue east	Former SR 812
Palm Beach	Lantana	216.606	348.594	Lantana Road west (CR 812) to I-95	Eastern terminus of Lantana Road and unsigned CR 812
Palm Beach	Lantana	216.945	349.139	SR 5 north (Federal Highway)	Northern end of SR 5 concurrency; southern end of SR 805 concurrency; northbound exit and southbound entrance
Palm Beach	Lake Worth	218.163	351.099	Sixth Avenue South to I-95	
Palm Beach	Lake Worth	218.666	351.909	SR 802 east (Lake Avenue) to SR A1A – Beaches	One-way eastbound
Palm Beach	Lake Worth	218.715	351.988	SR 802 west (Lucerne Avenue) to Florida's Turnpike	One-way westbound
Palm Beach	Lake Worth	219.468	353.200	10th Avenue North to I-95	
Palm Beach	West Palm Beach	221.361	356.246	SR 882 west (Forest Hill Boulevard) to I-95	Eastern terminus of SR 882
Palm Beach	West Palm Beach	222.783	358.534	SR 80 (Southern Boulevard / US 98 / SR 700) to SR A1A / I-95 / Florida's Turnpike – Beaches	
Palm Beach	West Palm Beach	223.789	360.153	Belvedere Road to I-95	Northern end of SR 805 concurrency; southern end of SR 5 concurrency; Belvedere Road is former SR 5 south.
Palm Beach	West Palm Beach	224.836	361.838	SR 704 east (Okeechobee Boulevard)	Southern end of SR 704 concurrency
Palm Beach	West Palm Beach	224.995	362.094	SR 704 west (Lakeview Avenue) to I-95 / Florida's Turnpike	Northern end of SR 704 concurrency
Palm Beach	West Palm Beach	225.896	363.544	SR A1A south (Quadrille Boulevard)	
Palm Beach	West Palm Beach	226.309	364.209	Palm Beach Lakes Boulevard	
Palm Beach	West Palm Beach	228.501	367.737	CR 702 west (45th Street) to I-95	
Palm Beach	Riviera Beach	230.576	371.076	SR A1A north / SR 708 west (Blue Heron Boulevard) to I-95	Eastern terminus of SR 708; serves John D. MacArthur Beach State Park
Palm Beach	North Palm Beach	232.230	373.738	SR 850 west (Northlake Boulevard) to I-95	Eastern terminus of SR 850
Palm Beach	North Palm Beach	233.94	376.49	Parker Bridge over Lake Worth Creek	
Palm Beach	Palm Beach Gardens	234.840	377.938	SR A1A south (Jack Nicklaus Drive) / SR 786 west (PGA Boulevard) to I-95 / Florida's Turnpike	Serves John D. MacArthur Beach State Park
Palm Beach	Juno Beach	236.051	379.887	CR A1A north	Southern terminus of CR A1A
Palm Beach	Juno Beach	237.480	382.187	To Donald Ross Road / I-95	
Palm Beach	Jupiter	241.407	388.507	SR 706 west / CR 706 east (Indiantown Road) to I-95 / Florida's Turnpike / CR A1A	Eastern terminus of SR 706; western terminus of CR 706
Palm Beach	Jupiter	242.161	389.720	CR A1A south (Ocean Boulevard)	Northern terminus of CR A1A
Palm Beach	Jupiter	242.35	390.02	Carlin White Bridge over Jupiter Inlet	
Palm Beach	Jupiter–Tequesta line	242.716	390.614	SR 811 south / CR 707 north (Beach Road) – Jupiter Island	Northern terminus of SR 811; southern terminus of CR 707 (Jupiter section)
Martin	Hobe Sound	249.639	401.755	CR A1A north (Southeast Dixie Highway)	Southern terminus of CR A1A
Martin	Hobe Sound	251.063	404.047	CR 708 (Bridge Road) to I-95	
Martin		257.953	415.135	To I-95 / Cove Road	
Martin		258.463	415.956	Salerno Road (CR 722 west) – Port Salerno, Indian River State College	Eastern terminus of CR 722
Martin	Stuart	260.486	419.212	To I-95 / CR A1A / Indian Street	To Indian Street Bridge
Martin	Stuart	261.515	420.868	SR 714 (Southeast Monterey Road) to I-95 / Florida's Turnpike / CR A1A	
Martin	Stuart	262.332	422.182	Southeast Cutoff Road	Former SR 5A north
Martin	Stuart	262.889	423.079	SR 76 west (Kanner Highway) to Colorado Avenue / I-95 / Florida's Turnpike – Indiantown	Eastern terminus of SR 76
Martin	Stuart	263.561	424.160	To CR 707 (Old Dixie Highway) / Joan Jefferson Way – Lyric Theatre	
Martin	Stuart	264.1	425.0	Roosevelt Bridge over St. Lucie River	
Martin	Stuart	264.732	426.045	To CR 707 (Old Dixie Highway) / Wright Boulevard	Interchange with direct ramp from US 1 south to CR 707 south
Martin	Jensen Beach	266.877	429.497	SR 732 east (Jensen Beach Boulevard) – Jensen Beach Business District	Western terminus of SR 732
St. Lucie	Port St. Lucie	268.901	432.754	SR 716 west (Port St. Lucie Boulevard) to I-95 / Florida's Turnpike	Eastern terminus of SR 716
St. Lucie	Fort Pierce	276.583	445.117	CR 712 (Midway Road) to I-95	
St. Lucie	Fort Pierce	279.080	449.136	CR 611 west (Edwards Road)	Eastern terminus of CR 611
St. Lucie	Fort Pierce	280.105	450.785	SR 70 west (Virginia Avenue) to I-95 / Florida's Turnpikecity1=Okeechobee}}	Eastern terminus of SR 70 SR 70 West into Okeechobee rd to okeechobee
St. Lucie	Fort Pierce	281.069	452.337	Sunrise Boulevard (CR 605 south)	Northern terminus of CR 605
St. Lucie	Fort Pierce	281.343	452.778	CR 770 west (Delaware Avenue)	Eastern terminus of CR 770; former SR 70 west
St. Lucie	Fort Pierce	281.377	452.832	Citrus Avenue – County Courthouse	Former SR 707
St. Lucie	Fort Pierce	281.577	453.154	SR 68 west (Orange Avenue) to I-95	Eastern terminus of SR 68
St. Lucie	Fort Pierce	282.152	454.080	SR A1A south (Seaway Drive) – Beaches, Hutchinson Island, St. Lucie County Historical Museum	Southern end of SR A1A concurrency
St. Lucie	Fort Pierce	282.667	454.908	Old Dixie Highway (CR 605 north)	Southern terminus of CR 605
St. Lucie	Fort Pierce	283.265	455.871	SR A1A – Beaches, Fort Pierce Inlet State Park	Northern end of SR A1A concurrency
St. Lucie		284.344	457.607	SR 608 west (St. Lucie Boulevard) – Airport	Eastern terminus of SR 608
St. Lucie		285.360	459.242	SR 615 south (North 25th Street) – Airport	Northern terminus of SR 615
St. Lucie	Indrio	287.010	461.898	CR 614 (Indrio Road) to I-95 – D.J. Wilcox Preserve, Indrio Scrub Preserve	
St. Lucie		289.118	465.290	SR 713 south (Turnpike Feeder Road) to Florida's Turnpike / I-95	Northern terminus of SR 713, interchange (unsigned exit 289) with ramp from US1 south to Turnpike Feeder Road south
Indian River	Florida Ridge	291.905	469.776	SR 606 west (Oslo Road) to I-95 / SR 607 – Oslo Riverfront Conservation Area	Eastern terminus of SR 606
Indian River	Vero Beach South	293.477	472.305	CR 603 north (Indian River Boulevard) to SR A1A – Beaches	Southern terminus of CR 603
Indian River	Vero Beach South	294.046	473.221	CR 612 (8th Street)	
Indian River	Vero Beach	295.194	475.069	SR 656 east (17th Street) to SR A1A – Beaches	Western terminus of SR 656; to Alma Lee Loy Bridge
Indian River	Vero Beach	295.567	475.669	SR 60 east (20th Street)	
Indian River	Vero Beach	295.625	475.762	SR 60 west (20th Place) to I-95 – Vero Beach Regional Airport	
Indian River	Gifford	297.840	479.327	CR 5A north	Southern terminus of CR 5A
Indian River	Gifford	298.153	479.831	CR 630 west (41st Street)	Eastern terminus of CR 630
Indian River	Gifford	299.731	482.370	CR 603 south to SR A1A – Beaches	Northern terminus of CR 603
Indian River	Winter Beach	301.289	484.878	CR 632 west (65th Street)	Eastern terminus of CR 632
Indian River	Winter Beach	301.814	485.723	CR 508 west (69th Street)	Eastern terminus of CR 508
Indian River	Wabasso	304.046	489.315	SR 510 east / CR 510 west to I-95 / SR A1A – Sebastian Inlet State Park, Disney’s Vero Beach Resort	Eastern terminus of CR 510; western terminus of SR 510
Indian River	Sebastian	308.874	497.085	CR 512 west (Sebastian Blvd) to I-95 / SR 512 – Fellsmere	Eastern terminus of CR 512
Indian River	Roseland	311.202	500.831	CR 505 south (Roseland Road) to SR 512 / CR 512 / I-95 – Orlando Health Sebastian River Hospital, Sebastian Municipal Airport, North County Library, Roseland Historic District	Northern terminus of CR 505
Brevard	Malabar	323.454	520.549	SR 514 west (Malabar Road) to I-95 – BCC/UCF Palm Bay Campus	Eastern terminus of SR 514
Brevard	Palm Bay	325.971	524.599	Palm Bay Road (CR 516 west)	Eastern terminus of unsigned CR 516
Brevard	Melbourne	329.326	529.999	US 192 (Strawbridge Avenue / SR 500) to I-95 / SR A1A – St. Cloud, Beaches, Airport	
Brevard	Melbourne	330.374	531.685	SR 508 west (NASA Boulevard) – Airport	Eastern terminus of SR 508
Brevard	Melbourne	332.797	535.585	To I-95 / Sarno Road (CR 5054 west)	Eastern terminus of CR 5054
Brevard	Melbourne	333.314	536.417	SR 518 (Eau Gallie Boulevard) to I-95 – Beaches, Patrick Space Force Base, Airport	
Brevard	Melbourne	333.757	537.130	CR 511 south (Aurora Road)	Northern terminus of CR 511
Brevard		338.91	545.42	SR 404 to I-95 – Patrick Space Force Base	Interchange
Brevard		343.727	553.175	CR 515 north (Rockledge Drive)	Southern terminus of CR 515
Brevard		345.515	556.052	CR 502 west (Barnes Boulevard) to I-95 – Airport	Eastern terminus of CR 502
Brevard	Cocoa	350.245	563.665	SR 520 (King Street) to I-95 – Cocoa Beach, Merritt Island	
Brevard	Cocoa	351.881	566.298	CR 503 west (Dixon Boulevard)	Eastern terminus of CR 503
Brevard	Cocoa	353.62	569.10	SR 528 / SR A1A south to I-95 – Cape Canaveral, Port Canaveral, Merritt Island, Kennedy Space Center, Orlando	Exit 46 on SR 528; northern terminus of SR A1A (Southern Florida section)
Brevard	Williams Point	357.009	574.550	Indian River Drive (CR 515 south)	Northern terminus of unsigned CR 515
Brevard	Titusville	362.83	583.92	SR 405 to I-95 – Kennedy Space Center, Orlando, Airport	Interchange
Brevard	Titusville	364.945	587.322	SR 50 west (Cheney Highway) to I-95	Eastern terminus of SR 50
Brevard	Titusville	368.520	593.075	SR 405 west (South Street)	Eastern terminus of SR 405
Brevard	Titusville	369.029	593.895	SR 406 west / CR 402 east (Garden Street) to I-95 – Beach	Eastern terminus of SR 406; western terminus of CR 402
Brevard	Mims	373.457	601.021	SR 46 west to I-95 – Sanford	Eastern terminus of SR 46
Brevard		381.776	614.409	To Stuckway Road (CR 5A west) / I-95	Eastern terminus of CR 5A
Volusia		386.452	621.934	Merritt Island Wildlife Refuge	Former SR 3 south
Volusia	Oak Hill	388.645	625.463	Halifax Avenue / Maytown Road	
Volusia	Edgewater	396.651	638.348	SR 442 west (Indian River Boulevard) to I-95	Eastern terminus of SR 442
Volusia	New Smyrna Beach	400.46	644.48	SR 44 east / SR A1A south (Lytle Avenue)	Interchange; western terminus of SR 44
Volusia	New Smyrna Beach	400.659	644.798	SR 44 Bus. (Canal Street) to I-95 / SR 44 – DeLand, Business District, Beaches	
Volusia	Port Orange	407.445	655.719	SR 5A north (Nova Road)	Southern terminus of SR 5A
Volusia	Port Orange	410.046	659.905	SR A1A north / SR 421 west (Dunlawton Avenue) to I-95 – Daytona Beach Shores	Eastern terminus of SR 421
Volusia	South Daytona–Daytona Beach line	413.120	664.852	SR 400 west (Beville Road) to I-4 / I-95	Eastern terminus of SR 400
Volusia	Daytona Beach	415.169	668.150	US 92 (International Speedway Boulevard / SR 600) to I-4 / I-95 – DeLand, Beaches	
Volusia	Daytona Beach–Holly Hill line	416.361	670.068	SR 430 (Mason Avenue)	
Volusia	Ormond Beach	420.678	677.016	SR 40 (Granada Boulevard) to I-95 / SR A1A – Tomoka State Park	
Volusia	Ormond Beach	422.505	679.956	SR 5A south (Nova Road)	Northern terminus of SR 5A
Volusia	Ormond Beach	423.622	681.754	CR 2813 south (Airport Road) – Airport	Northern terminus of CR 2813
Volusia	Ormond Beach	426.28	686.03	I-95 (SR 9) – Miami, Jacksonville	Exit 273 on I-95
Flagler	Korona	432.736	696.421	CR 2002 east (South Old Dixie Highway)	Western terminus of CR 2002
Flagler	Dupont	434.889	699.886	CR 304 west	Eastern terminus of CR 304
Flagler	Bunnell	438.305	705.384	SR 11 south / SR 100 east (Moody Boulevard) to I-95 – DeLand, Flagler Beach	Southern end of SR 100 concurrency; northern terminus of SR 11
Flagler	Bunnell	438.727	706.063	SR 100 west (SR 20) – Palatka	Northern end of SR 100 concurrency; eastern terminus of SR 20
Flagler	Bunnell	439.644	707.538	CR 13 north – Espanola, Flagler County Recreation Area and Fairgrounds	Southern terminus of CR 13
Flagler	Palm Coast	444.603	715.519	Palm Coast Parkway	
St. Johns		452.145	727.657	CR 204 west	Eastern terminus of CR 204
St. Johns		452.39	728.05	I-95 (SR 9) – Miami, Jacksonville	Exit 298 on I-95
St. Johns	Dupont Center	459.060	738.785	SR 206 – Hastings, Crescent Beach, Marineland, Fort Matanzas	
St. Johns		464.150	746.977	CR 5A north (Old Moultrie Road)	Southern terminus of CR 5A
St. Johns	St. Augustine South	466.699	751.079	SR 312 to SR 207 / I-95 / SR A1A – St. Augustine Beach, Beaches, Anastasia State Park	
St. Johns	St. Augustine	467.709	752.705	SR 207 south – Hastings	Northern terminus of SR 207
St. Johns	St. Augustine	468.403	753.822	US 1 Bus. north (King Street / SR 5A / CR 214 west) – Business District, Flagler College	Southern terminus of US 1 Bus.
St. Johns	St. Augustine	469.765	756.013	To SR A1A north / San Carlos Avenue	
St. Johns	St. Augustine	470.337	756.934	SR 16 (Picolata Road) to I-95 – Green Cove Springs, Vilano Beach, St. Johns River State College	
St. Johns	St. Augustine	470.850	757.760	US 1 Bus. south (San Marco Avenue / SR 5A) to SR A1A	Northern terminus of US 1 Bus.
St. Johns		472.113	759.792	CR 16A south (Lewis Speedway)	Northern terminus of CR 16A
St. Johns		478.204	769.595	International Golf Parkway – World Golf Village	
St. Johns		484.178	779.209	CR 210 west to I-95 – Green Cove Springs	
St. Johns	Durbin	484.805	780.218	CR 210 east – Palm Valley, Ponte Vedra Beach, Nocatee	
St. Johns		485.70	781.66	Nocatee Parkway – Nocatee, Palm Valley, Ponte Vedra Beach	Interchange
Duval	Bayard	489.17	787.24	SR 9B north to I-295 north	No access from US 1 to SR 9B south or vice versa; future I-795
Duval	Bayard	489.917	788.445	To I-95 / Old St. Augustine Road	
Duval	Jacksonville	492.04	791.86	I-295 (SR 9A) to I-95 – International Airport, Savannah	Exit 60 on I-295
Duval	Jacksonville	493.083	793.540	SR 115 north (Southside Boulevard)	Southern terminus of SR 115
Duval	Jacksonville	493.644	794.443	I-95 (SR 9) to I-295	Exit 339 on I-95
Duval	Jacksonville	495.493	797.419	Sunbeam Road (CR 116 west)	Eastern terminus of CR 116
Duval	Jacksonville	496.622	799.236	SR 152 (Baymeadows Road)	
Duval	Jacksonville	498.467	802.205	SR 202 east (J.T. Butler Boulevard) to I-95	Western terminus of SR 202
Duval	Jacksonville	500.235	805.050	To I-95 south / Bowden Road	
Duval	Jacksonville	500.327	805.198	SR 109 (University Boulevard) to I-95 north	
Duval	Jacksonville	502.069	808.002	US 1 Alt. north / SR 126 (Emerson Street) to I-95	Southern terminus of US 1 Alt.
Duval	Jacksonville	503.54	810.37	I-95 north (SR 9)	Northbound exit and southbound entrance (I-95 exit 348)
Duval	Jacksonville	503.820	810.820	US 90 east / SR 10 east (Atlantic Boulevard)	Southern end of US 90 and SR 10 concurrencies
Duval	Jacksonville	504.670	812.188	SR 13 south (Hendricks Avenue)	Southern end of SR 13 concurrency
Duval	Jacksonville	504.918	812.587	SR 13 north (Prudential Drive / SR 10 east) to I-95	Northern end of SR 13 concurrency; southern end of SR 10 concurrency
Duval	Jacksonville	505.22	813.07	Main Street Bridge over St. Johns River	
Duval	Jacksonville	505.43	813.41	Newman Street – County Court House	Interchange; northbound exit and southbound entrance
Duval	Jacksonville	505.517	813.551	Bay Street – Performing Arts Center, Convention Center	Former US 17 south / SR 15 south / SR 228 west
Duval	Jacksonville	505.573	813.641	SR 228 east (Forsyth Street)	Southern end SR 228 concurrency
Duval	Jacksonville	505.626	813.726	To I-10 / I-95 north / Adams Street	
Duval	Jacksonville	505.893	814.156	US 90 west (Beaver Street / SR 10)	Northern end of US 90 / SR 10 concurrency
Duval	Jacksonville	505.944	814.238	Union Street (SR 139 south / SR 10A east)	Northern terminus of SR 139; western terminus of SR 10A
Duval	Jacksonville	506.069	814.439	US 17 south / US 23 north / SR 228 west (State Street / SR 139 north) to I-95	Northern end of SR 228 concurrency; southern end of US 17 concurrency
Duval	Jacksonville	506.953	815.862	To I-95 / 8th Street	To SR 114
Duval	Jacksonville	507.69	817.05	US 17 north (Main Street / SR 5) / US 1 Alt. south (Martin Luther King Jr. Parkway / SR 115) – Yulee	Northern end of US 17 / SR 5 concurrency; southern end of SR 115 concurrency
Duval	Jacksonville	507.96	817.48	Pearl Street	Northbound exit and southbound entrance
Duval	Jacksonville	508.13	817.76	Boulevard	
Duval	Jacksonville	508.57	818.46	I-95 (SR 9 / SR 15 south / SR 115 north) – International Airport	Northern end of freeway; northern end of SR 115 concurrency; southern end of SR 15 concurrency; I-95 exit 354
Duval	Jacksonville	511.289	822.840	US 23 south (New Kings Road / SR 139)	Interchange; no northbound exit; southern end of US 23 concurrency
Duval	Jacksonville	512.33	824.52	SR 111 (Edgewood Avenue)	
Duval	Jacksonville	513.59	826.54	Soutel Drive (CR 115A)	
Duval	Jacksonville	515.51	829.63	I-295 (SR 9A) – St. Augustine, Daytona Beach, Savannah	Exit 28 on I-295
Duval	Jacksonville	517.67	833.11	SR 104 east (Dunn Avenue)	Western terminus of SR 104
Nassau	Callahan	526.43	847.21	Mickler Street (CR 15A north)	Southern terminus of CR 15A
Nassau		526.78	847.77	SR 115 south (Lem Turner Road)	Northern terminus of SR 115
Nassau	Callahan	527.14	848.35	US 301 south / SR A1A south / SR 200 east to I-95 – Baldwin, Yulee, Fernandina Beach, Bryceville	Southern end of US 301 concurrency; northern terminus of SR A1A
Nassau	Callahan	527.36	848.70	Brandies Avenue (CR 108 west)	Eastern terminus of CR 108
Nassau		527.79	849.40	CR 115 north (Old Dixie Highway)	Southern terminus of CR 115
Nassau	Hilliard	538.02	865.86	CR 108	
Nassau	Boulogne	544.82	876.80	CR 121 south	Northern terminus of CR 121
St. Marys River		545.03	877.14	St. Marys River bridge; Florida–Georgia line	
St. Marys River		545.03	877.14	US 1 north / US 23 north / US 301 north / SR 4 north / SR 15 north – Folkston, Nahunta, Waycross	Continuation into Georgia
1.000 mi = 1.609 km; 1.000 km = 0.621 mi: Concurrency terminus; Incomplete access

== Related routes ==
- U.S. Route 1 Business (St. Augustine, Florida)
- U.S. Route 1 Business (Florida City–Homestead, Florida)
- U.S. Route 1 Alternate (Jacksonville, Florida)
- U.S. Route 1 Alternate (St. Augustine, Florida)
- U.S. Route 1 Alternate (Acosta Bridge)

== See also ==
- The Torch of Friendship

U.S. Route 1
Previous state: Terminus	Florida	Next state: Georgia
