= James Eddy =

James Eddy may refer to:

- James R. Eddy (born 1931), politician in the American state of Florida
- J. W. Eddy (James Wade Eddy, 1832–1916), American businessman, founder of Arizona Mineral Belt Railroad
- Jim Eddy (1936–2016), American football coach

== See also ==
- Jamie Eddy (born 1972), Canadian ice sledge hockey player
