= New River Tunnel =

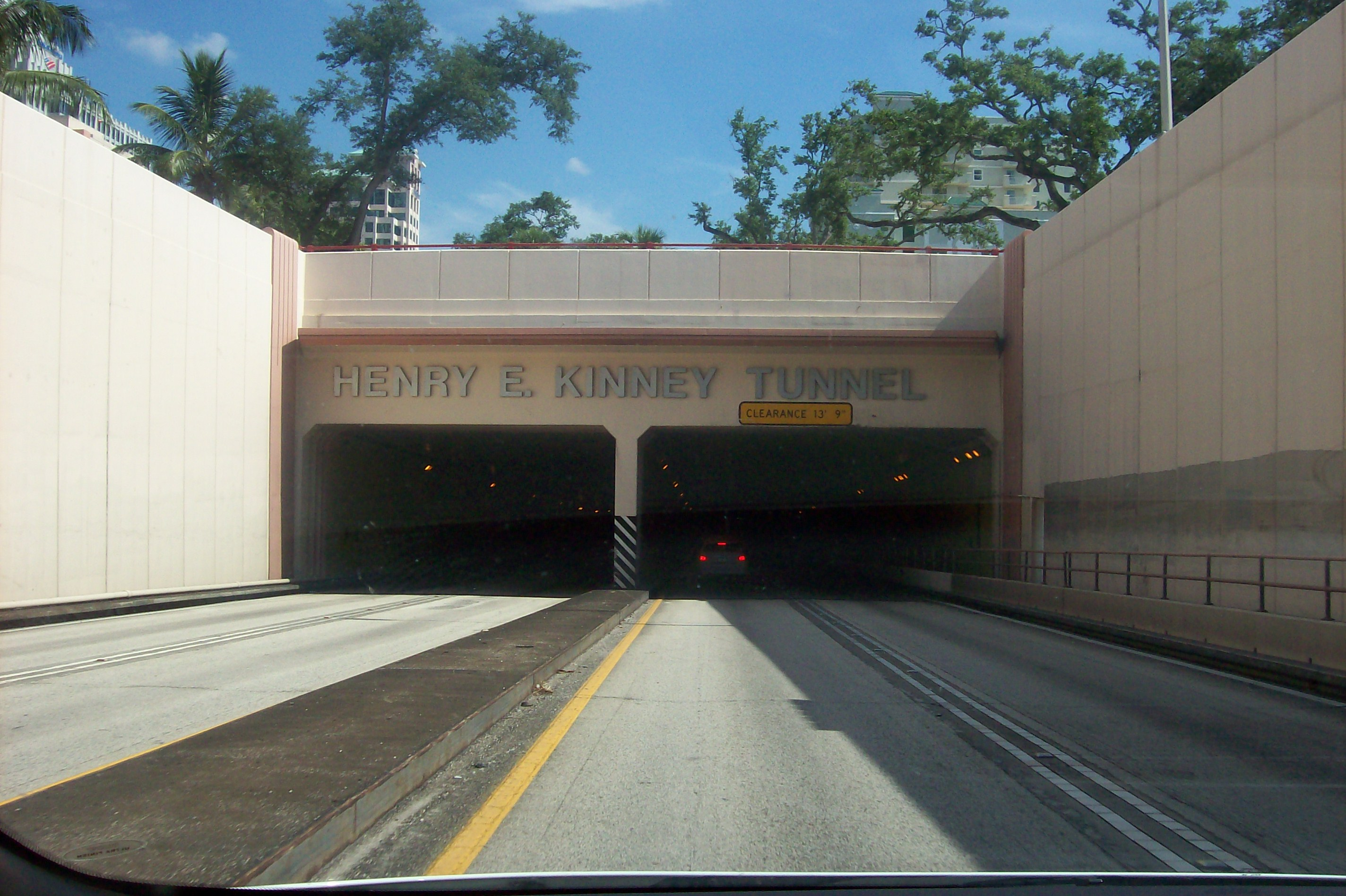
- Interactive map of New River Tunnel

Overview
- Official name: Henry E. Kinney Tunnel
- Other name: New River Tunnel
- Location: Fort Lauderdale, Florida
- Coordinates: 26.118°N 80.137°W
- Status: Active
- Route: US 1

Operation
- Opened: December 9, 1960
- Operator: FDOT
- Traffic: Automotive/pedestrian
- Character: Concrete road tunnel

Technical
- Length: 864 ft (263 m)
- No. of lanes: 4
- Min elevation: −35 feet (−11 m)
- Tunnel clearance: 13.75 feet (4.19 m)
- Width: 24 ft (7.3 m)
- Depth below water: 14 feet (4.3 m) above the tunnel at mean low water

The New River Tunnel, officially known as the Henry E. Kinney Tunnel, is a highway tunnel that carries U.S. Route 1 underneath the New River and Las Olas Boulevard in downtown Fort Lauderdale. The tunnel replaced the Federal Aid Highway Bridge, a drawbridge opened on August 26, 1926, and closed in 1958. Upon its completion in 1960, it was the only operating public tunnel in Florida. Alfred Spear as head of Thorington Construction Company of Providence, R.I., was responsible for the construction of the project.

The tunnel was built after a lengthy debate on whether to construct another bridge or a tunnel. The predecessor drawbridge operated so slowly that it sometimes took motorists 45 minutes to cross from one end of the bridge to the other, creating massive traffic jams in the heart of the city.

In 1986 it was renamed in honor of Henry E. Kinney, who had advocated its construction while he was chief of the Fort Lauderdale/Broward Edition of the Miami Herald newspaper.
