= Dupont, Florida =

Unincorporated community in Florida, U.S.

Coordinates: 29°25′38.78″N 81°13′23.60″W

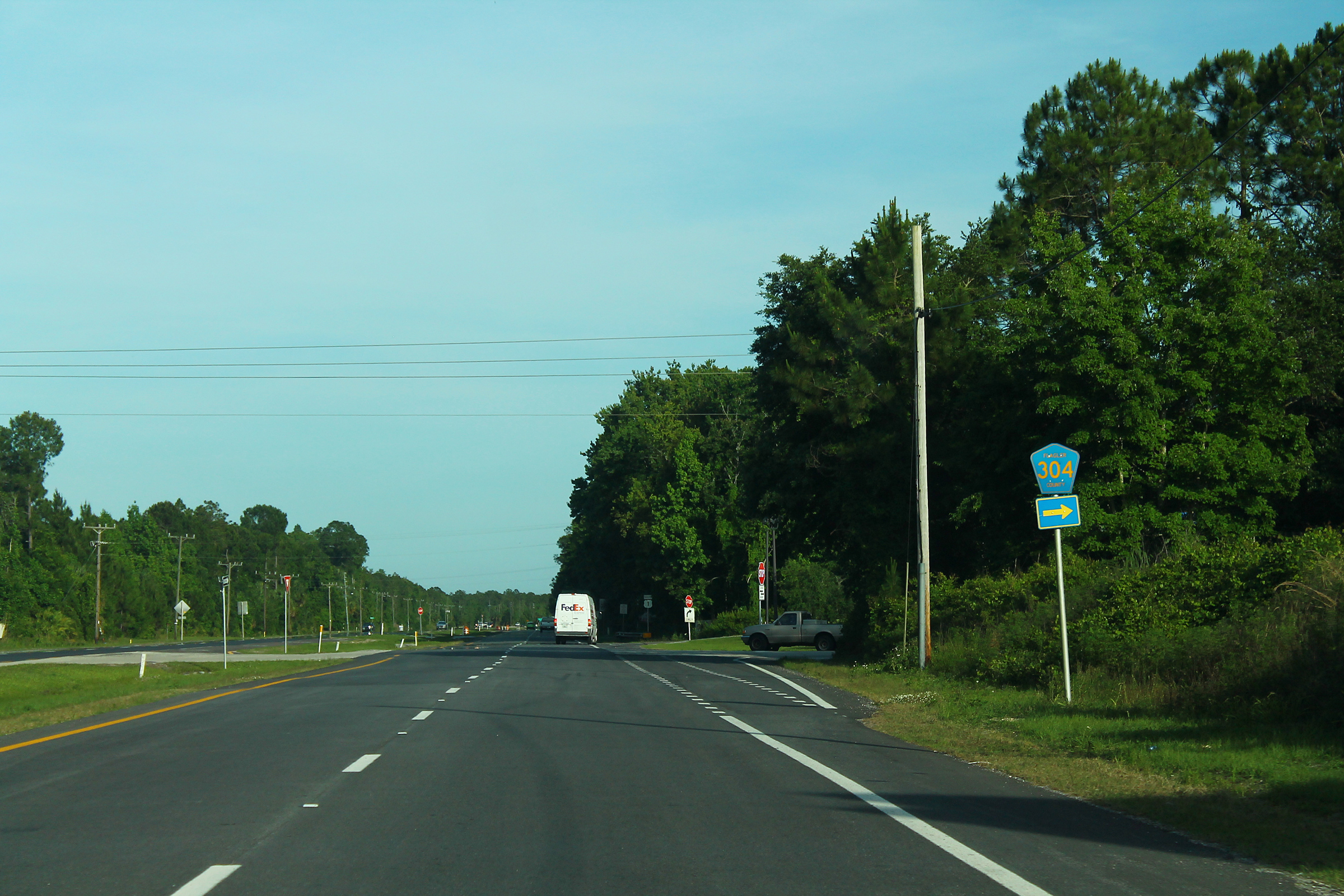
Southbound along US 1 and CR 304 in Dupont

Dupont is an unincorporated community in Flagler County, Florida, United States. It is located at the intersection of Dupont Road and US 1 southeast of Bunnell. The community is part of the Deltona–Daytona Beach–Ormond Beach, Florida metropolitan statistical area.
