= Cape Canaveral National Cemetery =

Veterans cemetery in Brevard County, Florida

- Interactive map of Cape Canaveral National Cemetery

Details
- Established: November 20, 2015
- Location: 5525 U.S. Highway 1, North; Mims, Florida 32754
- Country: United States
- Coordinates: 28°45′33″N 80°51′48″W
- Type: United States National Cemetery
- Owned by: U.S. Department of Veterans Affairs
- Size: 318 acres (129 ha)
- No. of graves: 17,000+
- Website: Official
- Find a Grave: Cape Canaveral National Cemetery

Cape Canaveral National Cemetery is a United States National Cemetery located near the Census designated place of Mims, Florida in Brevard County. It encompasses 318 acres (129 ha), and began interments on January 12, 2016.

== Site status ==
The land was purchased for $2.1 million during July 2012 by the Veterans Administration. Initial construction provided approximately 17,000 gravesites for both casket and cremation interments. The site has a distinguished front entrance on U.S. Route 1, a public information center with restrooms and an electronic gravesite locator. Other features include a memorial wall with ossuary and walkway, committal shelters for inclement weather and an assembly area surrounding the flagpoles. In the rear there are administration and maintenance buildings for facility employees. Other infrastructure includes paved roads, parking lots, landscaping, irrigation and underground utilities. The cemetery was dedicated on November 20, 2015.

Location of cemetery in Florida

== Notable interments ==
- James R. Eddy
