= James R. Eddy =

American politician (1931–2023)

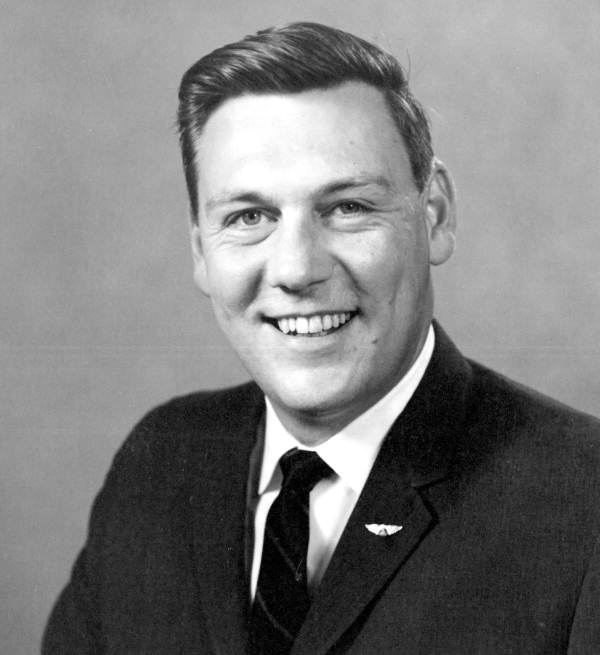

Member of the Florida House of Representatives from the 82nd Broward County-At Large district
- In office April 1963 – 1968

Personal details
- Born: James Rollins Eddy; February 23, 1931 Collinsville, Connecticut, U.S.
- Died: January 20, 2023 (aged 91) Seminole County, Florida
- Party: Republican
- Spouse(s): Marlene Elizabeth Smith (divorced); Jeannie Lee Gassaway
- Relations: Dr. George William Eddy, Father
- Children: Deborah, James, Justin
- Education: Duke University, University of Miami
- Occupation: Veteran, attorney, judge, politician

James Rollins Eddy (February 23, 1931 – January 20, 2023) was a Korean War veteran, lawyer, politician and judge in the American state of Florida. He served in the Florida House of Representatives from 1963 to 1968, representing the 82nd district.

== Early life ==
James Rollins Eddy was born in Collinsville, Connecticut, the youngest of four children of Ann and George William Eddy. His father was a physician who served in the Connecticut House of Representatives. The young Eddy attended the prestigious Choate Preparatory School in Connecticut. His obituary claims he was given a school tour by John F. Kennedy, another Choate alumni. According the Wikipedia's Choate article, Kennedy was on campus as a speaker at Choate's 50th anniversary in 1946. In 1949 Eddy enrolled at Duke University where he learned to fly as an ROTC Cadet. He was also a varsity wrestler. Upon graduation he was commissioned a second lieutenant in the United States Air Force and served in the 3rd Wing as an intelligence officer in Korea and Japan. Following active duty, he remained in the USAF Reserve where he achieved the rank of Major.

== Law ==
Eddy moved to Coral Gables, Florida where he enrolled at the University of Miami law school and joined Delta Theta Phi fraternity. He graduated with a Bachelor of Laws and later a Juris Doctor. Eddy passed the Florida Bar in 1959, was assigned bar number 21881 and went into private practice as James R. Eddy, P.A.

== Politics ==
Eddy was living in Plantation, Florida when he entered and won the 1963 election for the Florida House of Representatives. His district represented Broward County where he was the first Republican elected to a State office since the Reconstruction era. He was re-elected three times and served on several committees, including the influential Rules and Appropriations Committees. He was also the Vice Chairman of the Pari-Mutuels Affairs Committee and the Government Organization Committee where he took an active part in changing Florida's Administrative division from 106 agencies to 4 departments. He was on the Florida Legislative Counsel which was responsible for publishing Florida Statutes. Eddy was the Florida House Minority Leader from 1966 until 1968.

== Post politics ==
After leaving the House of Representatives Eddy returned to private practice as a civil trial lawyer. At various times during the next 44 years, he served as Deerfield Beach City Attorney, Pompano Beach Prosecutor, Tamarac Municipal Judge, Lighthouse Point Municipal Judge, Wilton Manors City Lobbyist, and Value Adjustment Board Tax Magistrate Judge for Miami-Dade, Broward, and Palm Beach Counties. He finally retired in 2013 at age 82.

== Personal life ==
Eddy married the former Marlene Elizabeth Smith in 1954. She was a figure skater who represented Canada in the 1952 Winter Olympics in Oslo. The couple had three children: Deborah, James & Justin but divorced in 1971. Eddy married his current wife in Jeannie Lee in 1995. Her children Robert and Trish were from a prior marriage. Eddy enjoyed community theater and served as president of Pompano Players. He was the founder of Pompano Flyers, a sport civil flying club and was its president.

== Death ==
On January 20, 2023, Eddy died aged 91 from Leukemia. As a sign of respect, Florida Governor Ron DeSantis ordered flags at the state capitol, Broward County Courthouse and Fort Lauderdale City Hall to be flown at half-staff on February 17, 2023, the day of his interment. A graveside service with military honors was conducted at Cape Canaveral National Cemetery in Mims, Florida.
