= Chalk's International Airlines =

US airline based in Florida (1917–2007)

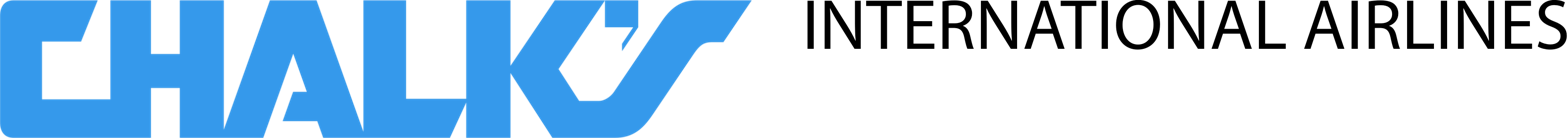
IATA	ICAO	Call sign
OP	CHK	CHALKS
- Founded: 1917 (as Red Arrow Flying Service)
- Commenced operations: July 4, 1919 (as Chalk's Flying Service); Unknown (as Chalk's International Airlines); March 1, 1996 (as Pan Am Air Bridge); December 17, 1999 (as Chalk's Ocean Airways); 2007 (as Chalk's International Airlines)
- Ceased operations: 2007; 19 years ago
- AOC #: FVYA015T
- Hubs: Miami Seaplane Base; Fort Lauderdale-Hollywood International Airport
- Frequent-flyer program: OceanPasses
- Parent company: Flying Boat Inc.
- Headquarters: Fort Lauderdale-Hollywood International Airport; Broward County, Florida, United States
- Key people: Rajan Nair (President); Bill Jones (Vice President); Jim Confalone (Owner)
- Founder: Arthur Burns "Pappy" Chalk

Chalk's International Airlines, formerly Chalk's Ocean Airways, was an airline with its headquarters on the grounds of Fort Lauderdale-Hollywood International Airport in unincorporated Broward County, Florida near Fort Lauderdale. It operated scheduled seaplane services to the Bahamas. Its main base was Miami Seaplane Base (MPB) until 2001, with a hub at Fort Lauderdale-Hollywood International Airport. On September 30, 2007, the United States Department of Transportation revoked the flying charter for the airline, and later that year, the airline ceased operations after nearly 90 years of flying.

== History ==
The airline was founded by Arthur Burns "Pappy" Chalk, and started ad-hoc charter operations as the Red Arrow Flying Service in 1917 flying a floatplane. After "Pappy" Chalk served in the Army Air Service in World War I, he returned to Miami. The company claimed to have commenced scheduled service between Miami and Bimini in the Bahamas in February 1919 as Chalk's Flying Service. Chalk's first base was a beach umbrella on the Miami shore of Biscayne Bay. In 1926 a landfill island, Watson Island, was created in Biscayne Bay close to Miami. Chalk's built an air terminal there, and operated from the island for the next 75 years.

During Prohibition, Chalk's was a major source of alcohol smuggled from the Bahamas to the United States.

Pappy Chalk sold the airline to his friend in 1966, but continued to be involved in the daily operations of the airline until he retired in 1975. He died in 1977 at the age of 88.

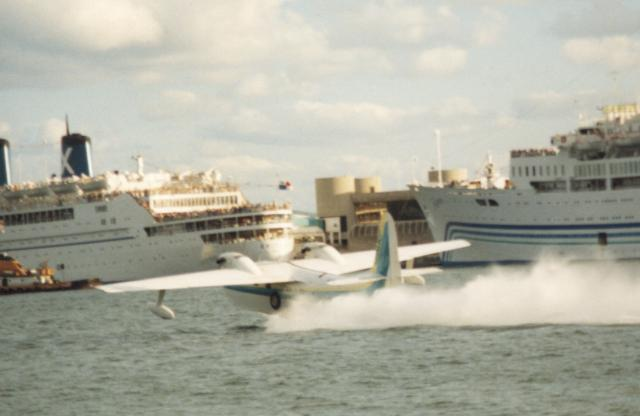
Chalk's Turbo Mallard taking-off from Miami Harbor in 1989

In the early 1970s, Frakes Aviation bought the rights to the aircraft and began a conversion program, replacing the old Pratt & Whitney R-1340 Wasp radial engines with Pratt & Whitney Canada PT6 turboprops. By 1985 three of Chalk's eight Grumman Mallards had been converted, with five ex-military piston engined Grumman Albatross aircraft making up the balance of the fleet.

In 1974, Resorts International purchased Chalk's Airlines, which became the primary air carrier to Paradise Island near the Bahamian capital of Nassau, where Resorts International owned and operated hotels and other resort facilities. After Resorts International constructed a short take off and landing (STOL) runway on Paradise Island and switched to using STOL-capable de Havilland Canada DHC-7 Dash 7 turboprop aircraft operated by subsidiary Paradise Island Airlines, it sold Chalk's in 1991 to United Capital Corporation, an Illinois-based investment firm (which was not affiliated with United Airlines). Prior to the acquisition, Resorts International was in severe financial distress and filed for Chapter 11 bankruptcy protection in 1989.

The television show Miami Vice, a symbol of both Miami and the 1980s, featured a Chalk's seaplane in its opening credits. N2969, which had a fatal accident in 2005, as Flight 101 is featured in an extended scene at the end of the third-season episode Baseballs of Death, when the antagonist attempts to leave the US. The music video for George Michael's "Careless Whisper" and Miami Vice second-season episode One Way Ticket featured a Chalk's seaplane, N2974. In one of the final scenes of the motion picture Silence of the Lambs, Dr Frederick Chilton is seen disembarking a Chalk's aircraft in Bimini, where Hannibal Lecter is waiting to "have him for dinner". A Chalks plane also makes an appearance at the end of the movie 'After The Sunset' with Pierce Brosnan and Salma Hayek's characters embracing as they stand next to it. Chalk's fleet was as high-maintenance as it was glamorous. It was a unique carrier, its Watson Island base being the smallest port of entry in the United States. Chalk's revenues were about $7.5 million in 1986, when it carried 130,000 passengers. Most were staying at Resorts International properties, although island residents used the airline for shopping trips to Miami.

United Capital expanded Chalk's service to Key West, Florida, and Nassau and acquired additional aircraft, but struggled financially. In 1996, United Capital sold Chalk's to a group of investors, who operated the airline under the name Pan Am Air Bridge. In January 1998, Texas-based aircraft lease company Air Alaska purchased 70% of Pan Am Air Bridge, but following the collapse of Air Alaska, Pan Am Air Bridge filed for Chapter 11 bankruptcy protection only a year later on January 11, 1999. James Confalone, a businessman and former Eastern Airlines pilot, purchased Chalk's out of bankruptcy for $925,000 on August 2, 1999; it had been reduced to two aircraft and only 35 staff. Confalone bought five additional Grumman Mallard seaplanes and arranged a contract to buy 14 larger Grumman G-111 seaplanes to expand the operation. On December 17, 1999, the airline was relaunched as Chalk's Ocean Airways.

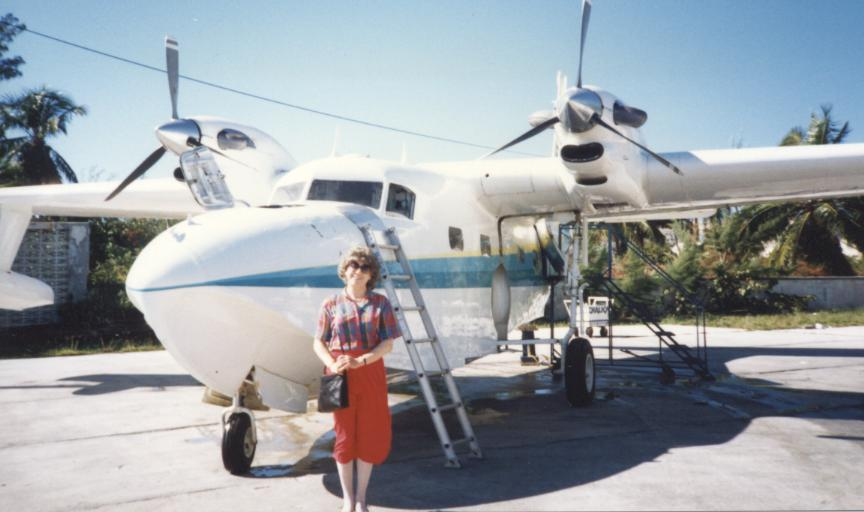
Chalk's Turbo Mallard at Bimini seaplane base, Bahamas, in November 1989. This is the accident aircraft of Chalk's Ocean Airways Flight 101

In late 2001 following the September 11 attacks, Chalk's was forced to leave its longtime operations base on Watson Island due to security concerns over its proximity to the Port of Miami. Helicopter traffic had also increased around Watson Island. Operations moved to Fort Lauderdale-Hollywood International Airport, where Chalk's already had its maintenance base.

The airline suspended operations after the crash of Chalk's Ocean Airways Flight 101 on December 19, 2005. It had planned to resume flights between Fort Lauderdale and the Bahamas under its earlier name of Chalk's International Airlines on November 9, 2006, but its airworthiness certificate issued by the Bahamas had expired. It resorted to using aircraft "wet leased" from and operated by Big Sky Airlines to operate flights from Fort Lauderdale to Key West and to St. Petersburg, Florida. Chalk's added flights between Palm Beach International Airport (PBIA) and destinations in the Bahamas in late May 2007, but carried only 14 passengers through PBIA that August.

Chalk's ceased flying from Fort Lauderdale-Hollywood International Airport after September 3, 2007. After the final report from the Flight 101 crash investigation was released, the United States Department of Transportation revoked the airline's flying authority for scheduled service on September 30, 2007, effectively shutting down the airline. Chalk's continued to hold its FAR 121 operating with a part 298 authority in good standing, and sought to add 60-passenger regional jets to its FAR 121 operating licence, but these efforts never came to fruition.

Chalk's had claimed to be the oldest continuously operating airline in the world, having begun operations in 1917 and scheduled flights in February 1919, and having only ceased operations for three years due to World War II, two days due to 1992's Hurricane Andrew, and eleven months due to an "at altitude tragedy" on December 19, 2005.

== Fleet ==
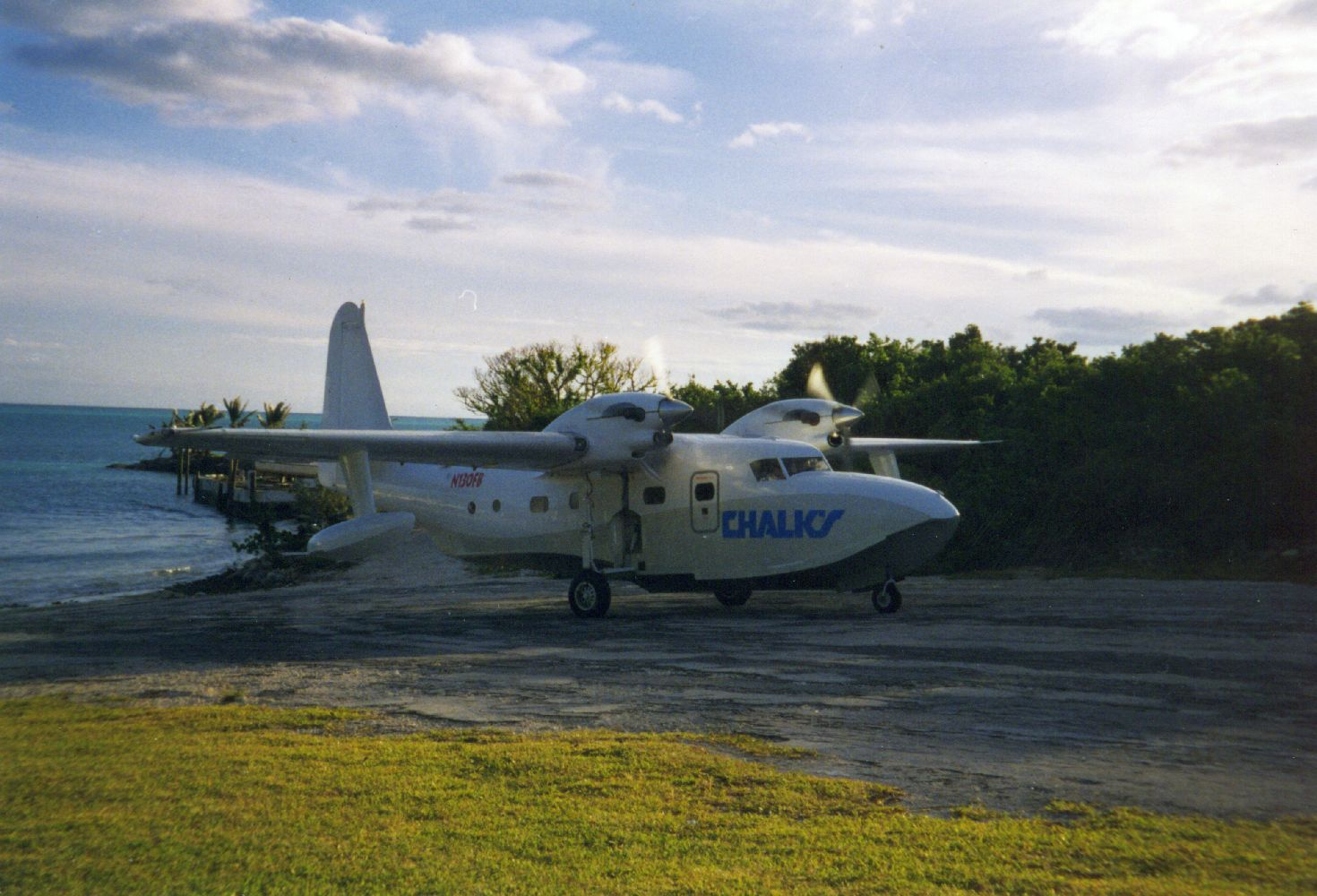
Grumman G-73T Turbo Mallard N130FB of Chalk's International Airlines taxies out of the water at Abaco, The Bahamas, November 1999.

During 2006 the airline leased conventional Beechcraft 1900D turboprop commuter land planes from Big Sky Airlines which were later replaced by Saab 340A and other wet leased aircraft while working with the Federal Aviation Administration to rebuild its fleet of Grumman G-73T Turbine Mallards.

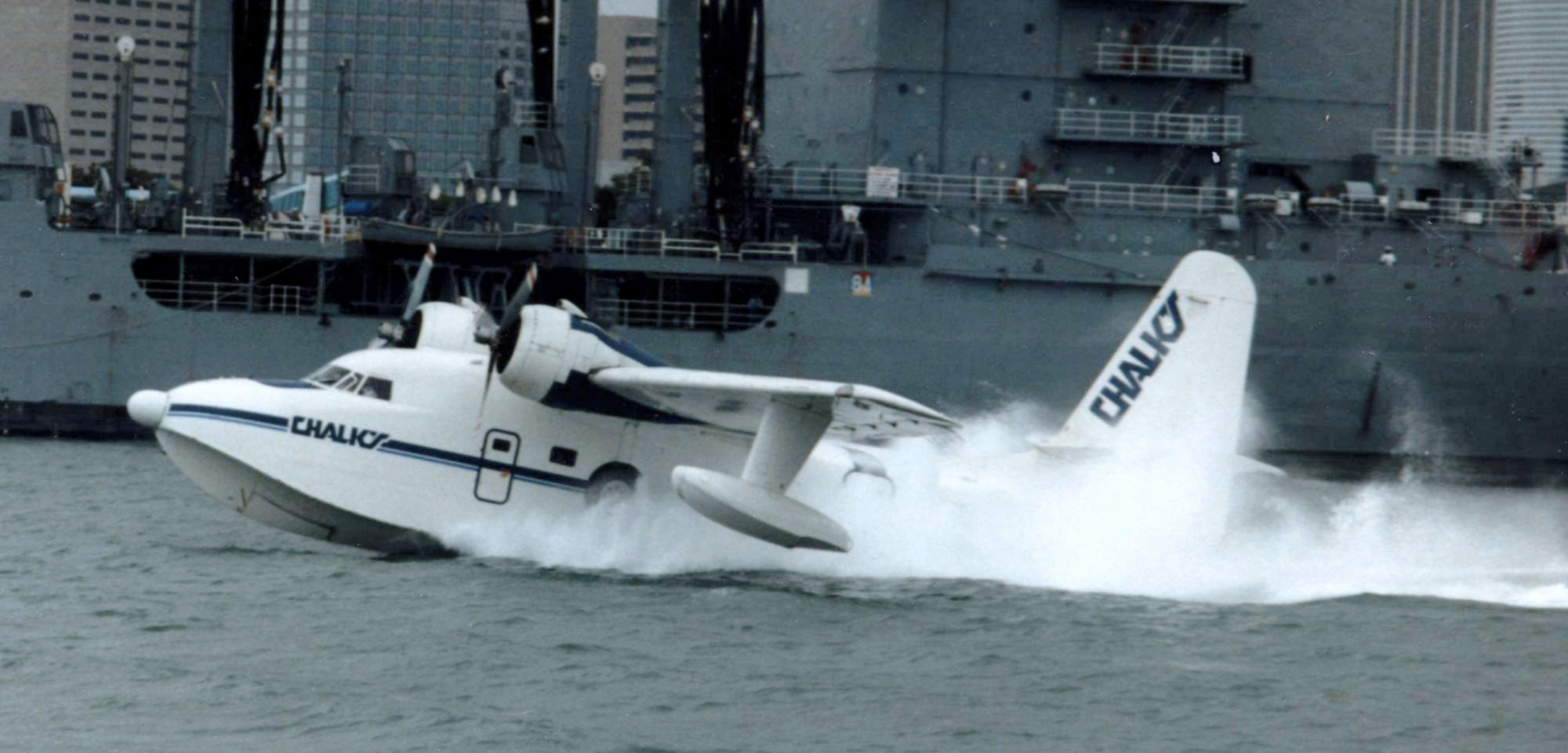
Chalk's Grumman Albatross arriving in Miami Harbor from Nassau, Bahamas, in March 1987

As of March 2007 the Chalk's International Airlines fleet comprised:

- 4 Mallards (5 originally delivered but one crashed)
- 2 Saab 340A The Saabs were chartered by Chalks from Bimini Island Air.

Chalk's also formerly operated the Grumman Albatross. These were the only Albatross sea planes ever converted into a full passenger configuration.

== Destinations ==
Chalk's International Airlines operated the following services (as of 2007):

Bahamas

- Bimini (South Bimini Airport)
- Freeport (Grand Bahama International Airport)
- Marsh Harbour (Leonard M. Thompson International Airport)
- Nassau (Lynden Pindling International Airport)
- Treasure Cay (Treasure Cay Airport)

United States

- Fort Lauderdale (Fort Lauderdale–Hollywood International Airport) Hub
- Key West (Key West International Airport)

== Incidents and accidents ==
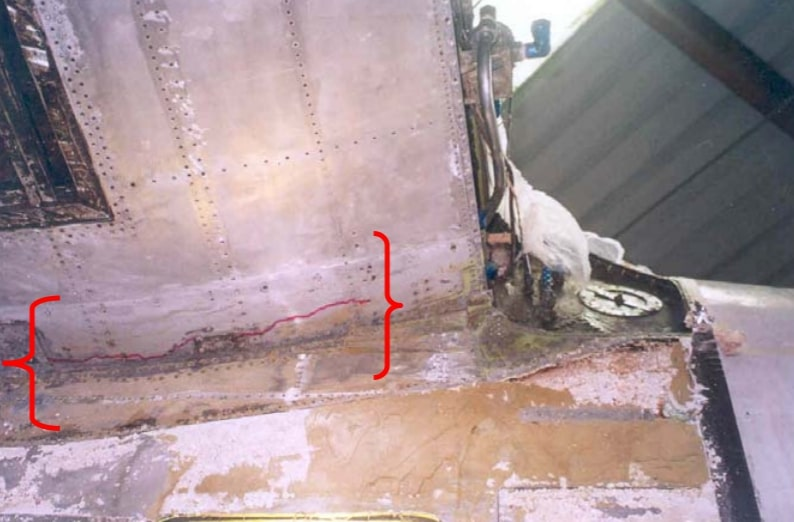
The crack on N142PA wings

- On March 18, 1994, Captain John Alberto and co-pilot Alan Turner drowned after their aircraft sank due to the failure of the airplane's bilge pump while they were taxiing at Key West. Captain Alberto left behind a wife and two children. Jimmy Buffett dedicated a chapter to Captain Alberto in his book A Pirate Looks At Fifty.
- On 11 June 2000, a Grumman G-73T Turbo Mallard, registration N142PA, struck a dock while taxiing at Watson Island, Miami. The aircraft sustained only minor damage, and all two crew members and 15 passengers survived without injuries.
- On December 19, 2005, Chalk's Ocean Airways Flight 101 from Fort Lauderdale to Bimini made an unscheduled stop at Watson Island, Miami. Within a minute of taking-off again, it fell into the sea near Miami Beach. Witnesses said they saw smoke billowing from the plane and the separation of its right wing as it plunged into the ocean. None of the twenty people on board – eighteen passengers and two pilots – survived. At first, only nineteen of the twenty bodies were found (by the Coast Guard and Miami Beach Ocean Rescue); on December 23, 2005, the twentieth was found by two Miami-Dade firefighters while fishing on their day off. Investigators later identified cracks in the main support beam connecting the wing to the fuselage. The plane was a Grumman G-73T Turbo Mallard, registration N2969, manufactured in 1947. It was the second fatal accident for Chalk's Ocean Airways. A few months after the NTSB released its report on the crash, the airline shut down.

== See also ==
- List of defunct airlines of the United States
- List of seaplane operators
