= Chalk's Ocean Airways Flight 101 =

2005 aviation accident in Florida

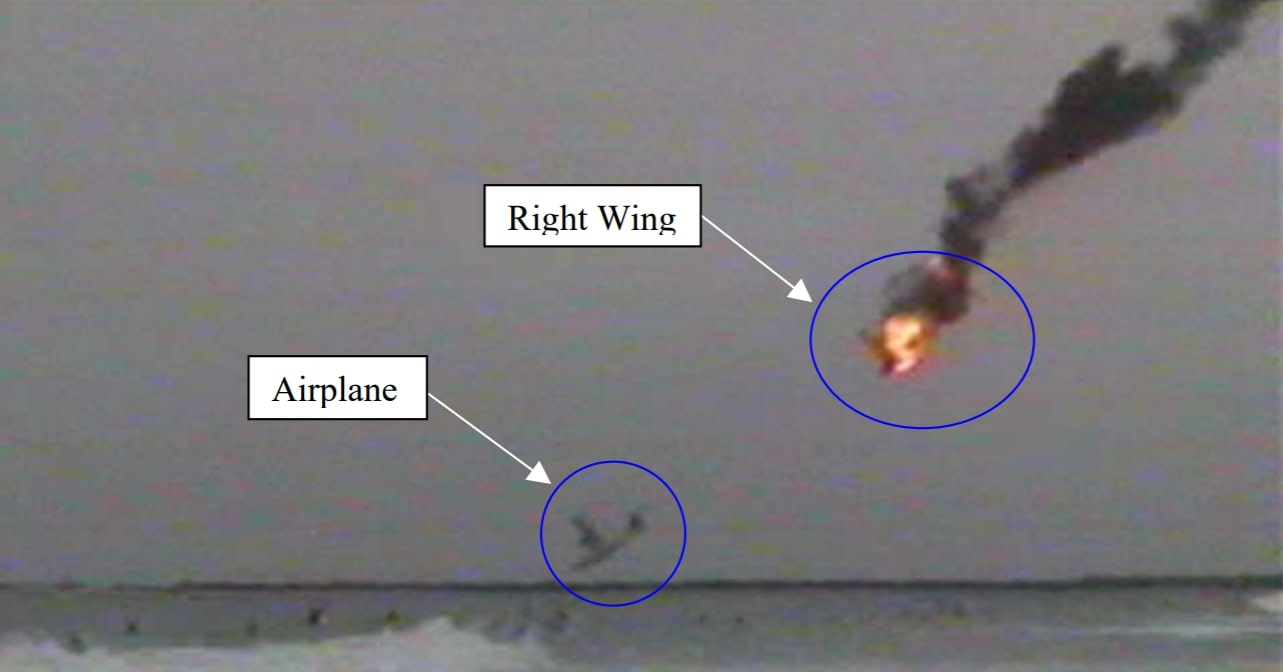
- The aircraft plunging into Government Cut after the in-flight breakup

Accident
- Date: December 19, 2005
- Summary: In-flight breakup due to metal fatigue cracking and poor maintenance
- Site: Government Cut, Port of Miami, Florida, United States; 25°45′38″N 80°07′26″W

Aircraft
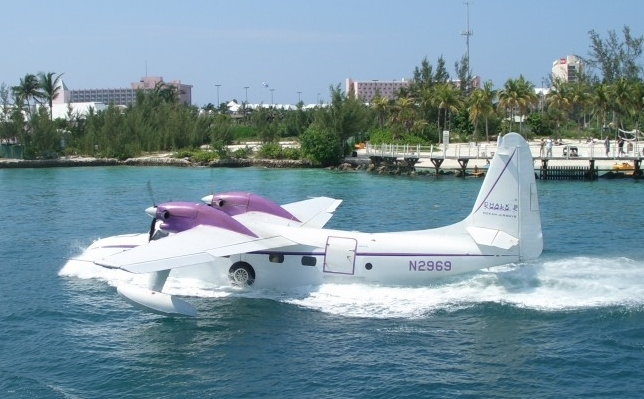
- N2969, the aircraft involved in the accident, pictured in July 2005
- Aircraft type: Grumman G-73T Turbo Mallard
- Aircraft name: Sunset Express
- Operator: Chalk's Ocean Airways
- Registration: N2969
- Flight origin: Fort Lauderdale–Hollywood International Airport, Florida, United States
- Stopover: Miami Seaplane Base, Florida, United States
- Destination: North Bimini Airport, The Bahamas
- Occupants: 20
- Passengers: 18
- Crew: 2
- Fatalities: 20
- Survivors: 0

Chalk's Ocean Airways Flight 101 was an aircraft that crashed off Miami Beach, Florida, in the United States on December 19, 2005. All 18 passengers and both of the crew members on board the 1947 Grumman G-73T Turbo Mallard died in the crash, which was attributed to metal fatigue on the starboard wing resulting in separation of the wing from the fuselage.

It was the only fatal passenger incident in Chalk's Ocean Airways history.

== Accident details ==
On December 19, 2005, Chalk's Ocean Airways Flight 101 from Fort Lauderdale, Florida, United States to Bimini, The Bahamas, crashed off Miami Beach, Florida, shortly after takeoff from an unscheduled stop at the Miami Seaplane Base. Witnesses saw white smoke billowing from the aircraft before the right wing ripped off and the aircraft plunged into the ocean.

The aircraft crashed and sank in Government Cut channel, a waterway that connects the Port of Miami with the Atlantic Ocean. Government Cut was closed to shipping until 6:30 p.m. on December 20, stranding at least three cruise ships.

The aircraft was a 58-year-old Grumman G-73T Turbo Mallard manufactured in 1947. The captain was Michele Marks, 37, of Boynton Beach, Florida. Marks had been promoted to captain a year prior to the accident. First Officer Paul DeSanctis, 34, of Wyomissing, Pennsylvania, had joined the airline eight months before the accident. Marks had 2,820 flight hours and DeSanctis had accumulated 1,420 flight hours. Both pilots died in the crash.

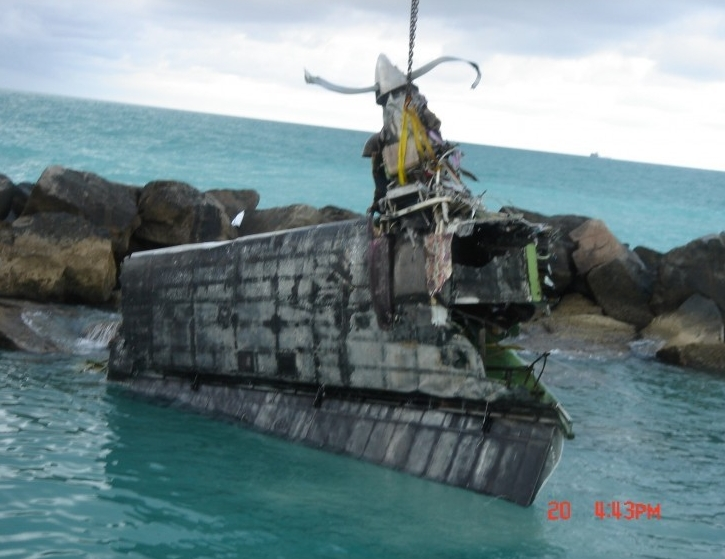
Flight 101's recovered right wing

On December 22, 2005, the NTSB issued a press release that included pictures showing metal fatigue on the wing that broke off. The discovery of the metal fatigue in the wing led to Chalk's Ocean Airways voluntarily grounding of the rest of its fleet for further inspection.

On May 30, 2007, Reuters reported that "The National Transportation Safety Board asserted Chalk Ocean Airways failed to identify and properly repair fatigue cracks on the 1947 Grumman Turbo Mallard. The plane lost its right wing a few minutes after take-off for the Bahamas at 500 feet (150 m) and plunged into the shipping channel adjacent to the Port of Miami on December 19, 2005." The safety board, in its final report on the probable cause of the crash, noted numerous maintenance-related problems on the aircraft and another owned by the company, raising questions about Chalk's Ocean Airways' aircraft maintenance practices. "The signs of structural problems were there but not addressed," safety board chairman Mark Rosenker said. The safety board also said the Federal Aviation Administration (FAA) failed to detect and correct the airline's maintenance shortfalls. Regulations exempt older seaplanes from rigorous structural oversight. Chalk's had no comment on the safety board's findings. The FAA said it had no indication that the airline's maintenance program was in question. "The regulations are crystal clear that the carrier has primary responsibility for the airworthiness of (its) fleet and that includes making appropriate structural repairs," the agency said in a statement.

== Probable cause ==
The NTSB determined that the probable cause of the accident was a fatigue failure in the right-wing initiated by a crack in a span-wise stringer close to the wing root. The crack had been detected running through a slosh hole (an aperture in the wall of the stringer that allows fuel to flow from one side of the stringer to the other) and seemingly repaired earlier, but the repair was ineffective. Chalk's Ocean Airways conducted several repairs to the area which did not restore "the load-carrying capability of the wing structure." The company failed to identify the repairs as ineffective. The NTSB found the maintenance programme of Chalk's Ocean Airways to be ineffective at addressing the longstanding structural problems which led to the accident.

The Mallard was designed in the 1940s with a so-called 'wet wing' where the fuel tanks, instead of being separate items within the wing, are constructed from sealed-off portions of the wing structure itself. This eliminates the additional weight of the tanks and also allows more fuel to be contained within a given wing size. The drawback of this form of construction is that all the joints around the tank seams must be sealed in order to ensure the tank is fuel-tight. In addition, the normal flexing of the wing in flight tends to open seams over extended periods, leading to fuel leaks. Grumman, the manufacturer, had issued warnings as early as 1963 about fuel leaks from the Mallard's wing being indicative of possible structural problems.

The accident aircraft had, for several months, suffered repeated fuel leaks from both wings that had been remedied by the operator by repeatedly applying a sealant to the inside seams of the fuel tanks. In applying the sealant inside the right wing tank the operator inadvertently applied the material over a damaged lower stringer (an important, load-bearing structural member of the wing) in such a way as to conceal a fatigue crack. The crack was discovered during previous maintenance, and an attempt was made to repair the crack by grinding it out. In applying the sealant, the operator was required to access the inside of the fuel tank using small removable inspection hatches on the top surface of the wing. This resulted in poor visibility and awkward conditions for working inside the tank. The sealant concealed the previous repair to the stringer and made subsequent checking for further damage to this component (i.e., any crack growth) impossible.

The first outward sign of possible significant problems with the accident aircraft was when a chord-wise crack (running from the front of the wing towards the rear) was noticed in the skin of the lower surface of the right-wing at the root. After several failed attempts at stopping the crack by drilling stop-holes, the crack was repeatedly repaired by affixing doublers (metal patches intended to take over the load from the damaged part, a normal repair procedure for minor skin damage), which were riveted over the cracked skin. However, the crack continued to grow, requiring longer and longer doublers to be fitted. Although the skin crack was slowly getting longer it was not thought to be anything other than a skin problem, which could be dealt with by affixing a doubler.

Like most aircraft of the period, the Mallard was built using an aluminum stressed skin construction. Unlike earlier fabric covered aircraft where the fabric covering is merely for aerodynamic purposes and contributes little to the overall strength of the airframe, the metal skin itself carries part of the flight loads and is stressed during flight. Many such aircraft develop minor skin cracks over time; provided appropriate action is taken to repair any cracking, the safety of the aircraft is not compromised.

The unseen cracked stringer on the accident aircraft allowed the right wing to flex more during flight which increased the bending forces at the root such that the visible skin crack slowly increased in length with each subsequent flight.

The crack in the underside of the wing grew in length until the wing was so weakened it was unable to support the flight loads during the accident flight, and the wing separated. This caused the fuel contained within the wing to be released and ignited, resulting in the fire seen by witnesses. By sheer chance, a tourist from New York was able to capture video of Flight 101's final moments on his cell phone as the plane went plunging towards the ocean. The footage clearly showed the airplane and the right burning wing falling on two separate spots as they hit the water.

On examination of the wreckage, investigators discovered that, in addition to the external doublers, internal doublers had also been affixed to the root area of both wings. However, maintenance records for these repairs were not available. Investigators also concluded that the cracked stringer that initiated the wing loss had probably failed completely some considerable amount of time prior to the accident, leading to a substantial weakening of the wing structure.

== Age of fleet ==
The accident aircraft had been built in 1947 and the manufacturer, Grumman (now Northrop Grumman), had produced only 60 examples of this type. Grumman ceased production of the aircraft in 1951, leaving operators with no source of new spare parts. Chalk's Ocean Airways had to resort to acquiring several un-airworthy Mallards to cannibalize for spares. In addition, the sort of aircraft used for Chalk's operations, a passenger-carrying flying boat, is of a type no longer manufactured by aircraft companies, so the option of replacing the aging Mallard fleet with newer designs was not available. At the time of the accident, the accident aircraft was 58 years old, had accumulated more than 31,000 total flight hours, and had completed over 40,000 take-off/landing cycles.

When certified in 1944, the Mallard design was required to satisfy a static strength analysis. However, no fatigue requirement was yet in force, as no satisfactory fatigue analysis method had been developed at that time. The Mallard therefore had not been designed with any 'safe life' figure, unlike most civil transport aircraft today, which have designed fatigue lives of around 65,000–70,000 hours, or twenty years. In addition, no authorized repair manual for the aircraft type had been issued by the manufacturer, and responsibility for authorizing repair techniques was acquired by an outside company after Grumman discontinued support for the type.

The accident aircraft had been acquired by Chalk's in 1980 and had been upgraded to a G-73T Turbo Mallard in July 1981 when its original Pratt & Whitney Wasp H piston engines had been replaced with Pratt & Whitney Canada PT6 turboprops.

== Pilots' concerns ==
As a result of several incidents involving Chalk's aircraft, concern had arisen among Chalk's pilots about the state of repair of the aircraft. Pilots had experienced several engine failures, and in one incident an elevator control cable snapped in flight, although fortunately the pilot was able to land that aircraft safely. This led to several of Chalk's pilots reconsidering their position in the company, and one, having suffered two engine failures during his period there, resigned his position over what he perceived as persistent maintenance issues with the fleet.

After the accident, all remaining Mallards in the Chalk's fleet were grounded. Subsequently, all were discovered to be suffering from severe corrosion with many showing signs of sub-standard repair during maintenance. Two years later, Chalk's, one of the world's oldest airlines, went out of business.

== Passengers and crew ==
Nationality	Passengers	Crew	Total
The Bahamas	11	0	11
United States	7	2	9
Total	18	2	20

Twenty people — 18 passengers and 2 crew members — were on board. There were no survivors. Just over half of the passengers were Bimini locals returning from Christmas shopping. Three of the passengers were infants who were situated on the laps of their parents and guardians.

The last body found was recovered by a fisherman near Key Biscayne, 9 miles (14 km) from the crash site. The bodies of all the other passengers were found still strapped in their seats. A notable passenger was Sergio Danguillecourt, a board member of Bacardi, who was travelling to Bimini with his wife Jacqueline to purchase a yacht.

== Dramatization ==
The story of the disaster was featured on the ninth season of the Canadian National Geographic Channel show Mayday (known as Air Disasters in the US, Mayday in Ireland and Air Crash Investigation in the UK and the rest of world). The episode is entitled "Cracks In The System".

Chalks Plane N2969 was used in the pilot episode Brother's Keeper of the television series Miami Vice, in which a drug dealer used the seaplane to evade Ricardo "Rico" Tubbs & James "Sonny" Crockett.

N2969 was also used in seasons 1 and 4 of Miami Vice, (Season 1) Heart of Darkness and (Season 4) Baseballs of Death.
