= Arthur Burns "Pappy" Chalk =

American aviation pioneer

Arthur Burns "Pappy" Chalk (September 3, 1888 – May 26, 1977) was an American aviation pioneer and the founder of Chalk's Ocean Airways, once the world's oldest continuously operating airline. Born on a farm in Unionville, Illinois, Chalk was an enrolled Choctaw Freedman. At 11, Chalk left home and moved to Paducah, Kentucky, where he worked as a bicycle mechanic. In 1911, he received flying lessons from the famed pilot Tony Jannus in exchange for repairing Jannus's aircraft. Chalk then purchased his own plane, barnstormed for several years, and relocated to Miami in 1917.

Chalk relocated to Miami in 1917 and established the "Red Arrow Flying Service" at the dock of the Royal Palm Hotel. He initially operated using a small table under a beach umbrella as his office. His early flights included routes to the Bahamian islands, with his aircraft equipped with floats to facilitate water landings. In 1919, Chalk's operation was renamed Chalk's Flying Service, and he inaugurated regular flights between Miami and the island of Bimini in The Bahamas using a pair of Curtiss Model F and Curtiss Model H floatplanes.

Chalk sold the airline in 1966 but remained actively involved until his death in 1977. He died following a fall while pruning a tree at his home in Miami.
