= Grumman HU-16 Albatross =

American seaplane

HU-16 Albatross
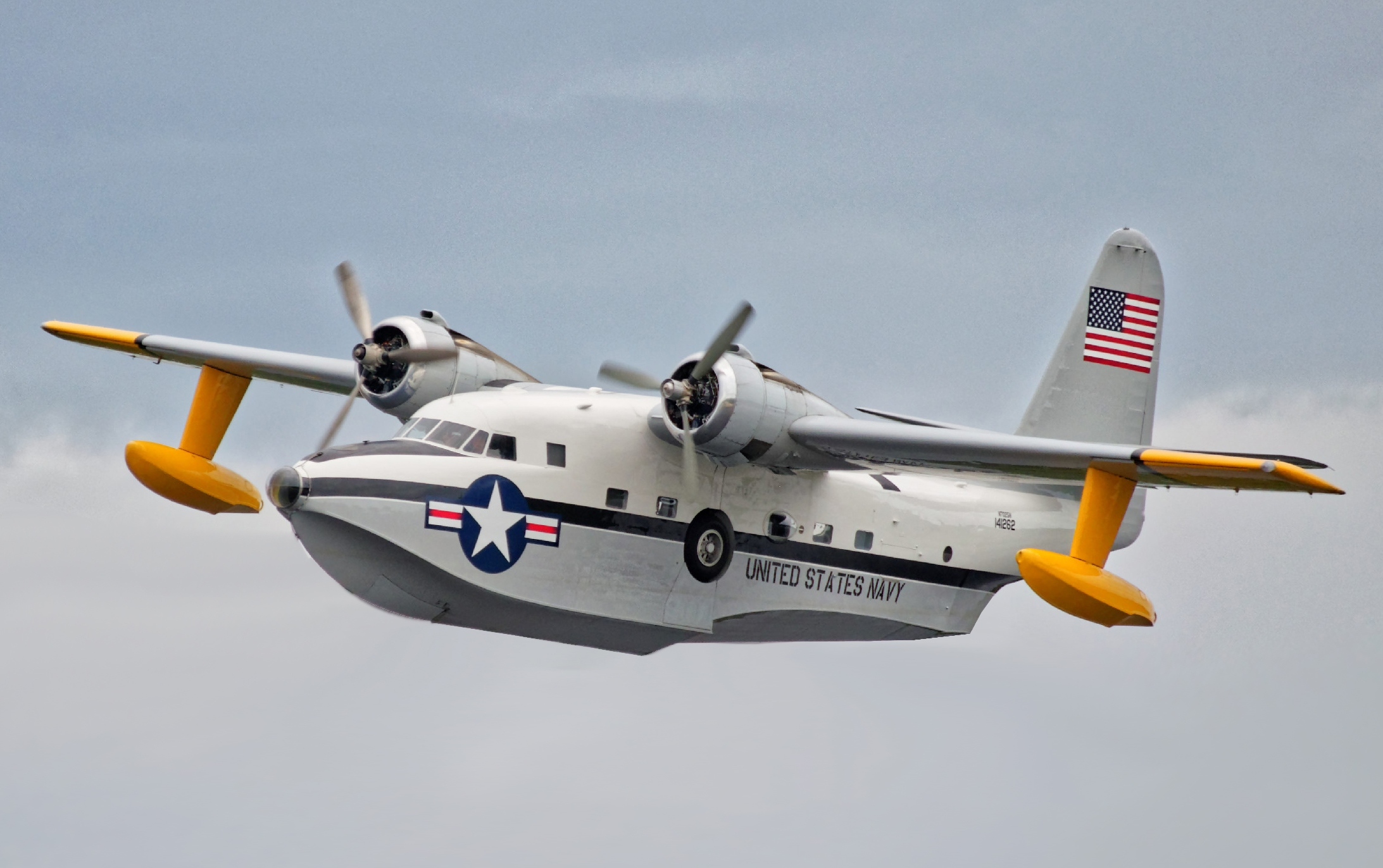
- A United States Navy Grumman UF-1 Albatross

General information
- Type: Air-sea rescue flying boat
- Manufacturer: Grumman
- Status: In limited use
- Primary users: United States Air Force United States Coast Guard; United States Navy; Royal Canadian Air Force; Hellenic Navy
- Number built: 466

History
- Manufactured: 1949–1961
- Introduction date: 1949
- First flight: 24 October 1947
- Retired: 1995 (Hellenic Navy)
- Developed from: Grumman Mallard

The Grumman HU-16 Albatross is a twin-radial-engined, amphibious flying boat that was designed and produced by American aircraft manufacturer Grumman. Originally designated as the SA-16 in USAF service and the JR2F-1 and UF-1 in USN and USCG service, respectively, it was redesignated as the HU-16 in 1962.

It was operated by a wide range of air services, including the United States Air Force (USAF), United States Navy (USN), United States Coast Guard (USCG), and Royal Canadian Air Force (RCAF). It was most commonly operated as a search-and-rescue (SAR) aircraft. Even after its retirement by multiple US-based military services, the Albatross continued to be operated by the military services of several other countries. The last military operator of the type was the Hellenic Navy of Greece, which withdrew its last examples in 1995.

== Design and development ==
The Hu-16 Albatross has its origins in a requirement issued by the USN for a new amphibious utility aircraft. Among the performance criteria stipulated was the need for it operate from snow and ice by the use of removable skis. The Hu-16, which was an improvement of the preceding Grumman Mallard, was designed in response; it was capable of landing in the open ocean if operationally required. Its deep-V hull cross-section and keel length enable it to land in the open sea. The Albatross was designed for optimal 4-foot (1.2 m) seas, and could land in more severe conditions, but required jet-assisted takeoff (JATO or simply booster rockets) for takeoff in 8–10-foot (2.4–3.0 m) seas or greater. The Albatross initially carried an APS-31A radar in a pod on the left wing, but this position meant the fuselage obstructed the radar's ability to search to the right of the flying boat, thus it was repositioned to the nose on later SA-16As.

The HU-16 Albatross is a high-wing, amphibious, flying boat. For land operations, retractable landing gear was installed; the main gear retracted into a well in the side of the hull, which would flood during water operations. Most of this water would be forced out through a hole in the rear bulkhead by the acceleration forces generated during the takeoff run. The nose gear was twin-wheeled and free-castering, thus no nose-wheel steering was possible. The nose gear compartment was sealed from the hull and would also partially flood during water operations; this compartment could be visually inspected from the flight deck via a compact window. For lateral stability during water operations, the Hu-16 was provisioned with tip floats. The underside of the flying boat was constructed using round-head rivets, while the remainder of the hull used flush rivets, instead.

The original model of the HU-16 was powered by a pair of Wright R-1820-76 nine-cylinder, two-speed supercharged, radial engines, capable of producing up to 1,450 hp, that drove a three-bladed constant-speed propeller. These propellers were electrically controlled and hydraulically actuated, and had an integrated oil cooler within the hub dome. One advantage of this arrangement was that propeller control was available on engine start without needing to wait for engine oil to warm. Both to improve manoeuvrability while on the water and to shorten its landing run, the propellers with reversible; JATO apparatus was also optionally fitted, enabling the type to conduct a relatively rapid takeoff run. Differential engine power was needed to achieve directional control on the water, as the air rudder was not effective at slow speeds with no water rudder present. Differential braking was relatively troublesome to accomplish. The majority of fuel was contained in wing tanks, while additional fuel could be stored within the tip floats, although the latter could not hold much fuel without rendering the HU-16 unable to operate from the water due to decreased buoyancy. Wing racks were commonly fitted for the carriage of bombs or drop tanks. When fully fueled (including the use of drop tanks), the HU-16 could cover 3,000 miles, enabling nonstop flights between Alaska and Japan.

The HU-16 was furnished with a fully reversible flight-control system, which comprised a combination of cables, pulleys, and pushrods. The rudder could be hydraulically boosted, although this was not required for normal flight and was typically only active while performing takeoffs and landings; it could also relieve pedal forces during single-engine flight. Electrically actuated trim tabs were present on the elevators, rudder, and left aileron, while the right aileron was furnished with a fixed tab, instead. The elevator trim tabs were controlled and actuated independently for redundancy. The flaps were electrically controlled, hydraulically actuated, and hydraulically balanced.

Any Hu-16 could be outfitted with the Triphibian conversion kit, which involved the fitting of a hydraulically actuated skid below the keel of the hull, along with compact outrigger skids onto purpose-built mounting tubes fitted to the floats and reinforcement of the keel. When fitted, the flying boat could directly land on ice and snow in addition to runways and bodies of water. This kit was not the only means of preparing the Hu-16 for winter operations; several of the USN's fleet were structurally reinforced for such purpose.

On 24 October 1947, the first prototype performed its maiden flight; shortly thereafter, the USAF placed its own order for the type, initially designated SA-16A, to perform air-sea rescue operations. The type was originally intended solely for military service, hence civil certification for the original model was not pursued. During the mid-1950s, the improved SA-16B, which featured increased wingspan, larger ailerons, and bigger tail surfaces, was developed. In 1957, the first early-build model was converted to this configuration. Despite these improvements, the flying boat's speed and altitude limitations were viewed as limiting its usefulness by the late 1960s.

=== Proposed new build ===
Amphibian Aerospace Industries in Darwin, Australia, acquired the type certificate for the Hu-16. In December 2021, the firm announced that it planned to commence manufacture of a new version of the HU-16, which was scheduled to commence in 2025. Designated the G-111T, it is planned to be fitted with modern avionics and powered by a pair of Pratt & Whitney PT6A-67F turboprop engines; several configurations would be developed for different roles, including passenger transport, cargo haulage, SAR, coastal surveillance, and aeromedical evacuation.

== Operational history ==
=== United States services ===
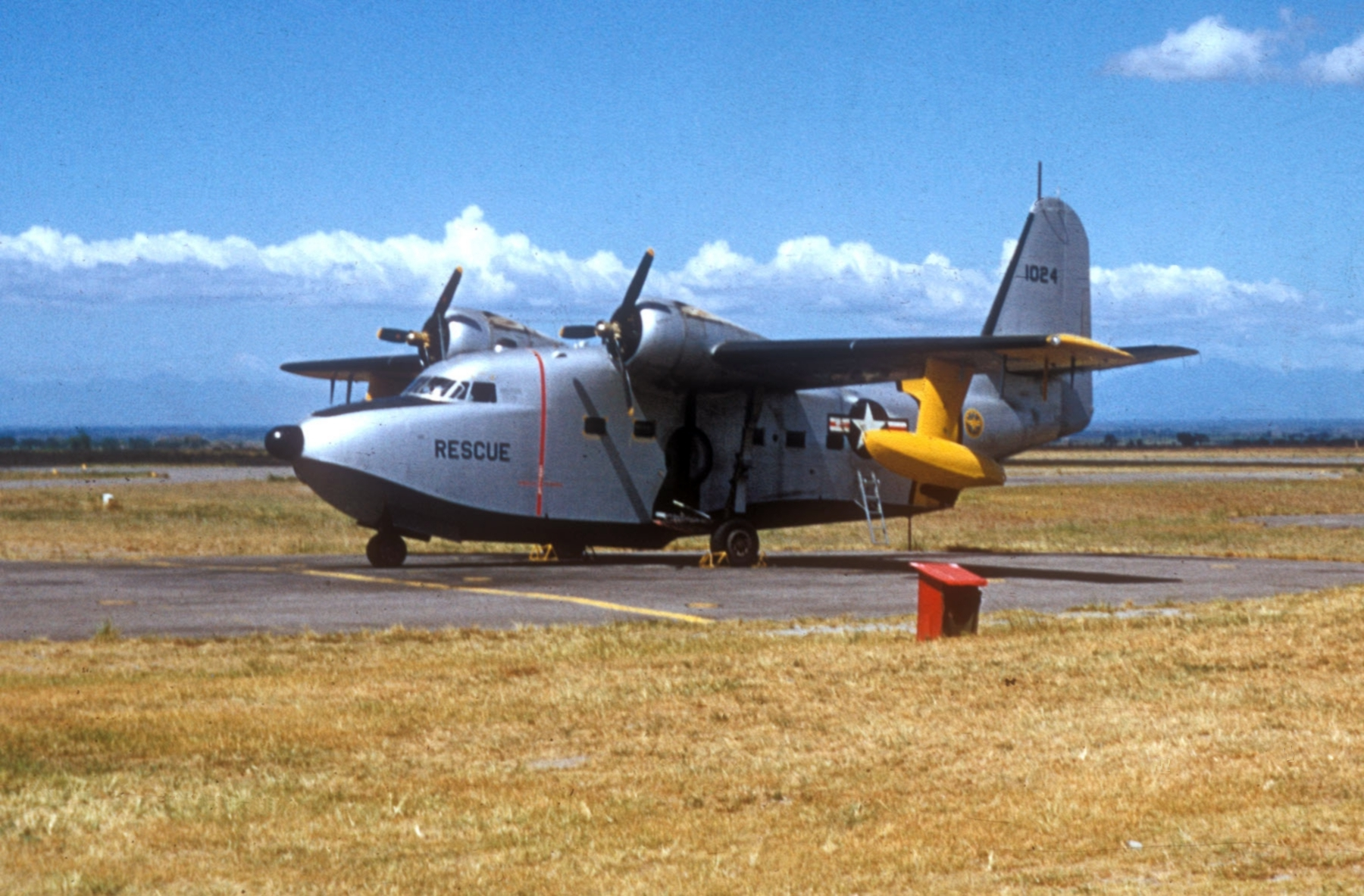
A USAF SA-16A during the Korean War

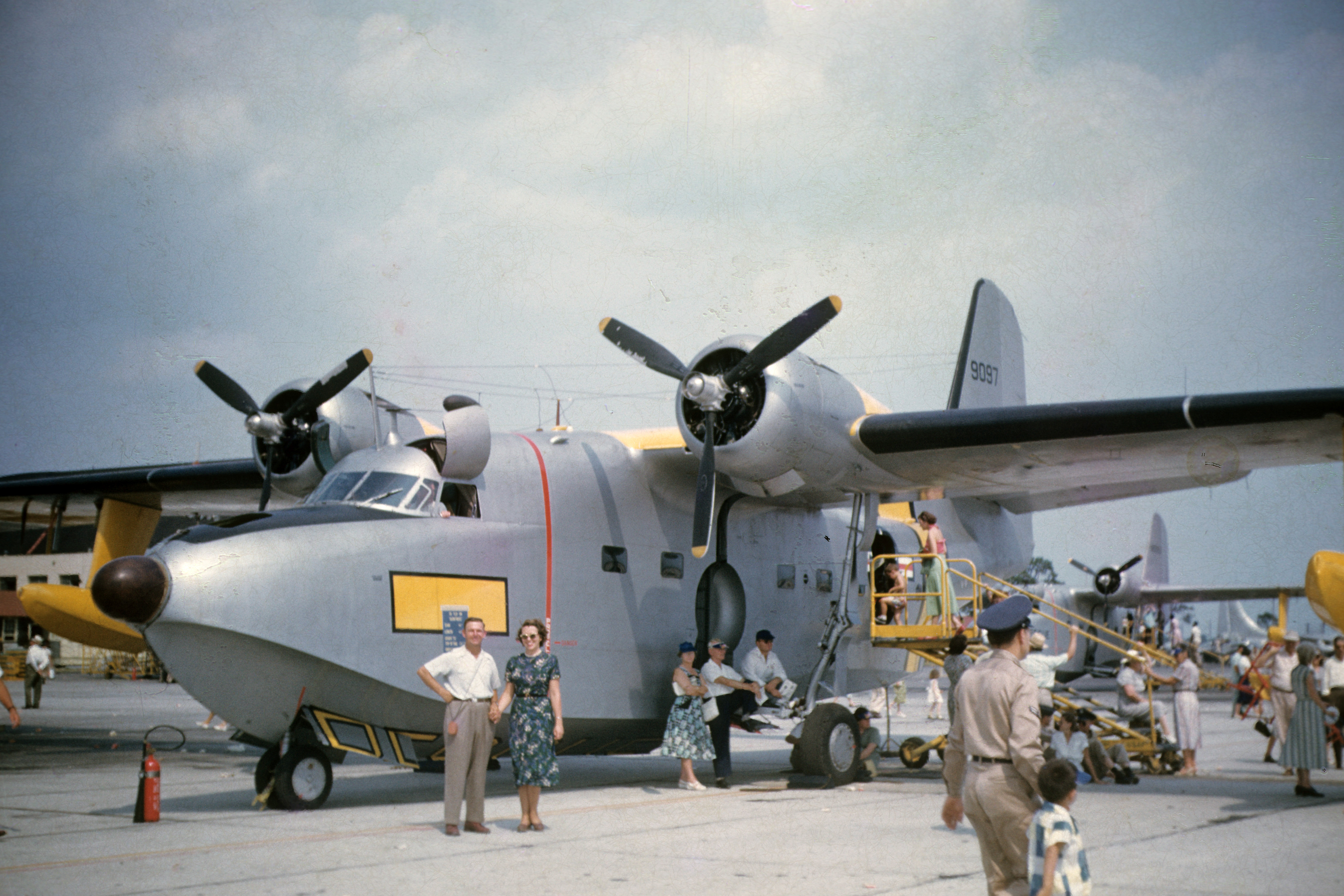
Grumman HU-16 Albatross at MacDill AFB Florida 1951 or early 1952

Most Albatrosses were used by the USAF, primarily in the SAR mission role and initially designated as SA-16. The USAF used the SA-16 extensively in Korea for combat rescue, earning a reputation as a rugged and seaworthy craft. Later, the redesignated HU-16B (long-wing variant) Albatross was used by the USAF Aerospace Rescue and Recovery Service and saw extensive combat service during the Vietnam War. In addition, a small number of Air National Guard air commando groups were equipped with HU-16s for covert infiltration and extraction of special forces from 1956 to 1971. Other examples of the HU-16 made their way into Air Force Reserve rescue and recovery units prior to its retirement from USAF service.

The USN also employed the HU-16C/D Albatross as an SAR aircraft from coastal naval air stations, both stateside and overseas. It was also employed as an operational support aircraft worldwide and for missions from the former Naval Air Station Agana, Guam, during the Vietnam War. Goodwill flights were also common to the surrounding Trust Territory of the Pacific Islands in the early 1970s. Open-water landings and water takeoff training using JATO was also conducted frequently by USN HU-16s from locations such as NAS Agana, Guam; Naval Station Guantanamo Bay, Cuba; NAS Barbers Point, Hawaii; NAS North Island, California, NAS Key West, Florida; NAS Jacksonville, Florida; and NAS Pensacola, Florida, among other locations.

In July 1952, an SA-16 from the 58th Air Rescue Squadron rescued 32 survivors of a British Douglas DC-3 that had crashed in the Mediterranean Sea. The pilot, Capt. Kendrick U. Reeves, later received the Cheney Award for his actions.

In October 1957, an SA-16B flew to a position 120 nautical miles south-southeast from Sardinia to pick up a F-100 pilot. After recovering the pilot, takeoff was determined to be impossible due to damage from the landing, and the aircraft taxied 45 nautical miles towards Bizerte, Tunisia, before being taken in tow by a French Navy corvette for the remainder of the trip. This incident set the USAF's record for the longest taxi time from water to dry land.

As part of the International Ice Patrol in 1958 and 1959, USCG UF-2Gs dropped Mk 35 and Mk 36 incendiary bombs on icebergs.

On 24 May 1962, a USAF SA-16 was launched to assist in the recovery of the Aurora 7 space capsule and astronaut Scott Carpenter. Despite arriving on scene ahead of two USN Sikorsky SH-3 Sea King helicopters, the Albatross was instructed not to land by the recovery force commander due to concerns over its ability to take off again in heavy seas. (Note: An Air Force pararescue team that attended to the capsule and astronaut were dropped from a SC-54 that had arrived earlier.) A minor controversy later arose over whether the decision was motivated by interservice rivalry.

In February 1964, a USAF HU-16B sent to retrieve the nose cone of a missile fired from Cape Kennedy Air Force Station ran out of fuel after rough seas forced it to attempt to taxi back to land. As no nearby ships carried aviation gasoline, a fuel truck was lashed to the deck of the USCGC Hollyhock, the aircraft was refueled, and it was finally able to take off after five days on the ocean.

On 14 March 1966, an HU-16B, serial number 51-071, attempted a rescue of the crew of an F-4C that had ejected over the Gulf of Tonkin. After landing to pick up the pilot, the aircraft was struck by a mortar round fired from the nearby shore, killing the radio operator and seriously injuring the flight mechanic. The aircraft then sank, drowning the pararescueman, who was tethered to it. The pilot, copilot, flight mechanic, navigator, and both F-4 crew were later rescued by H-3 helicopters. The navigator, Captain Donald Price, was later awarded the Air Force Cross for his actions.

Three days later, on 17 March 1966, an HU-16 was involved in the recovery of Gemini 8.

The HU-16 was also operated by the USCG as both a coastal and long-range, open-ocean SAR aircraft for many years until it was supplanted by the HU-25 Guardian and HC-130 Hercules.

The final USAF HU-16 flight was the delivery of AF Serial No. 51-5282 to the National Museum of the United States Air Force at Wright-Patterson Air Force Base, Ohio, in July 1973 after setting an altitude record of 32,883 feet (10,023 m) earlier in the month.

The final US Navy HU-16 flight was made 13 August 1976, when an Albatross was delivered to the National Naval Aviation Museum at NAS Pensacola, Florida.

The final USCG HU-16 flight was at Otis Air National Guard Base in Cape Cod in March 1983, when the aircraft type was retired by the USCG.

=== Other operators ===
The Pakistan Air Force operated four SA-16As from 1958 to 1968, which it received under the Mutual Defense Assistance Act. No. 4 Squadron was equipped with them while based at Drigh Road Air Base. The SA-16s were used for maritime reconnaissance and coastal patrol during the 1965 War with India. At least one SA-16 was on patrol during the 17-day war, flying 14 missions in support of the Pakistan Navy. They were stored on 19 August 1968.

The Indonesian Air Force operated eight UF-1s acquired in 1958 and four ex-West German Navy UF-2Ss acquired in 1977, all were assigned to the 5th Air Squadron and were retired in the 1980s. The Indonesian Navy also operated two ex-USN UF-2 received in 1960. Five UF-1s of the 5th Air Squadron were deployed in the frontline airfields during the Operation Trikora in 1962. They were used for various roles, including maritime patrol, SAR, weather observation, and forward air control. One of them went missing and was presumed to have crashed into the sea after entering cumulonimbus clouds during a SAR mission on 17 May 1962. Two Indonesian Navy's UF-2s were also deployed to Maluku Islands during Operation Trikora. Three Grumman Albatrosses from the Indonesian Air Force took part in the 1975 invasion of East Timor for maritime patrol role. Due to shortage of ground-attack aircraft in the initial stage of the invasion, the Albatross was modified so it could be armed with 12.7 mm M2 Browning machine guns, bombs, and rockets. The Albatross was only used once for a ground-attack mission.

The Royal Canadian Air Force (RCAF) operated the Albatross, which was locally designated as CSR-110, which replaced the service's WW2-era Consolidated PBY Catalina fleet to conduct search and rescue (SAR) duties. It was replaced by a combination of rotorcraft and the de Havilland Canada DHC-5 Buffalo aircraft.

=== Civil operations ===
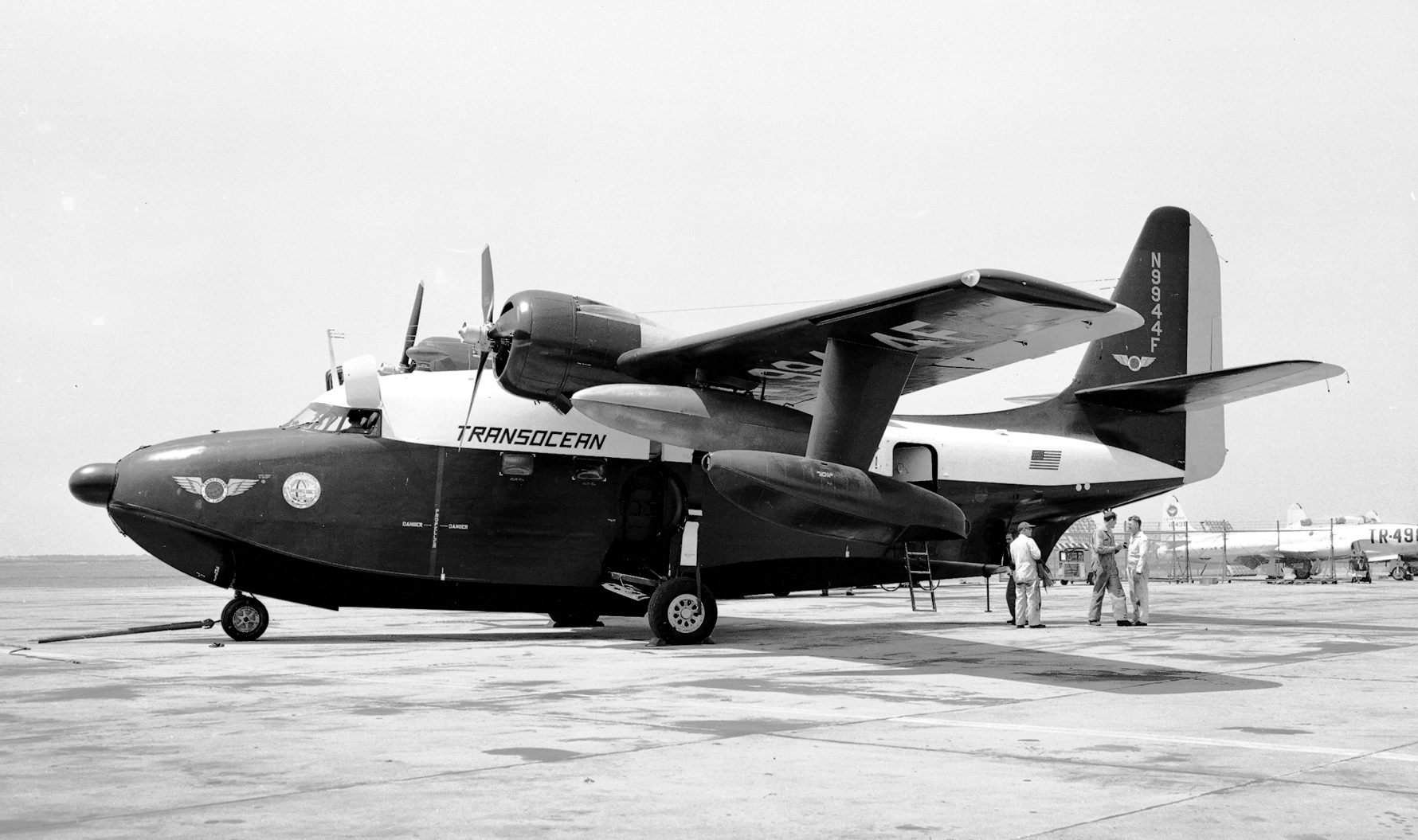
Transocean Air Lines SA-16 used for Trust Territory service, Oakland 1954

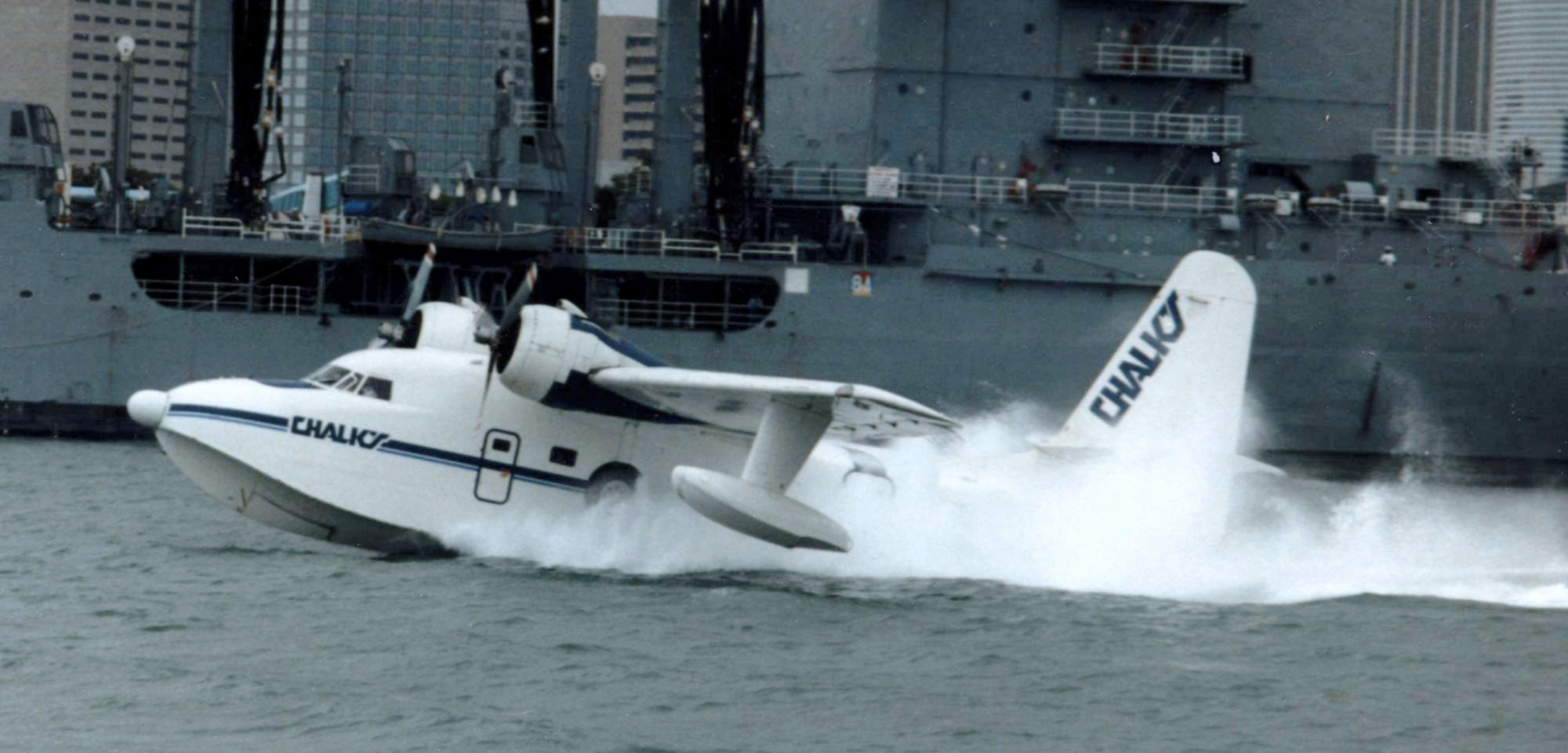
Chalk's International Airlines Albatross arriving in Miami Harbor from Nassau, Bahamas, in 1987

In the 1950s, Transocean Air Lines flew SA-16s under contract to the United States Department of the Interior between the islands of Micronesia. After Transocean's 1960 bankruptcy, Pan American World Airways and finally Continental Airlines' Air Micronesia operated the Albatrosses serving Yap, Palau, Chuuk (Truk), and Pohnpei from Guam until 1970, when adequate island runways were built, allowing land operations.

Many surplus Albatrosses were sold to civilian operators, mostly to private owners. These aircraft are operated under either experimental-exhibition or restricted category and cannot be used for commercial operations, except under very limited conditions.

In the early 1980s, Chalk's International Airlines, owned by Merv Griffin's Resorts International, had 13 Albatrosses converted to standard category as G-111s. This made them eligible for use in scheduled airline operations. These aircraft underwent extensive modifications from the standard military configuration, including rebuilt wings with titanium wing-spar caps, additional doors, and modifications to existing doors and hatches, stainless steel engine oil tanks, dual engine fire-extinguishing systems on each engine, and propeller auto-feather systems installed. The G-111s were operated for only a few years and then put in storage in Arizona. Most are still parked there, but some have been returned to regular flight operations with private operators.

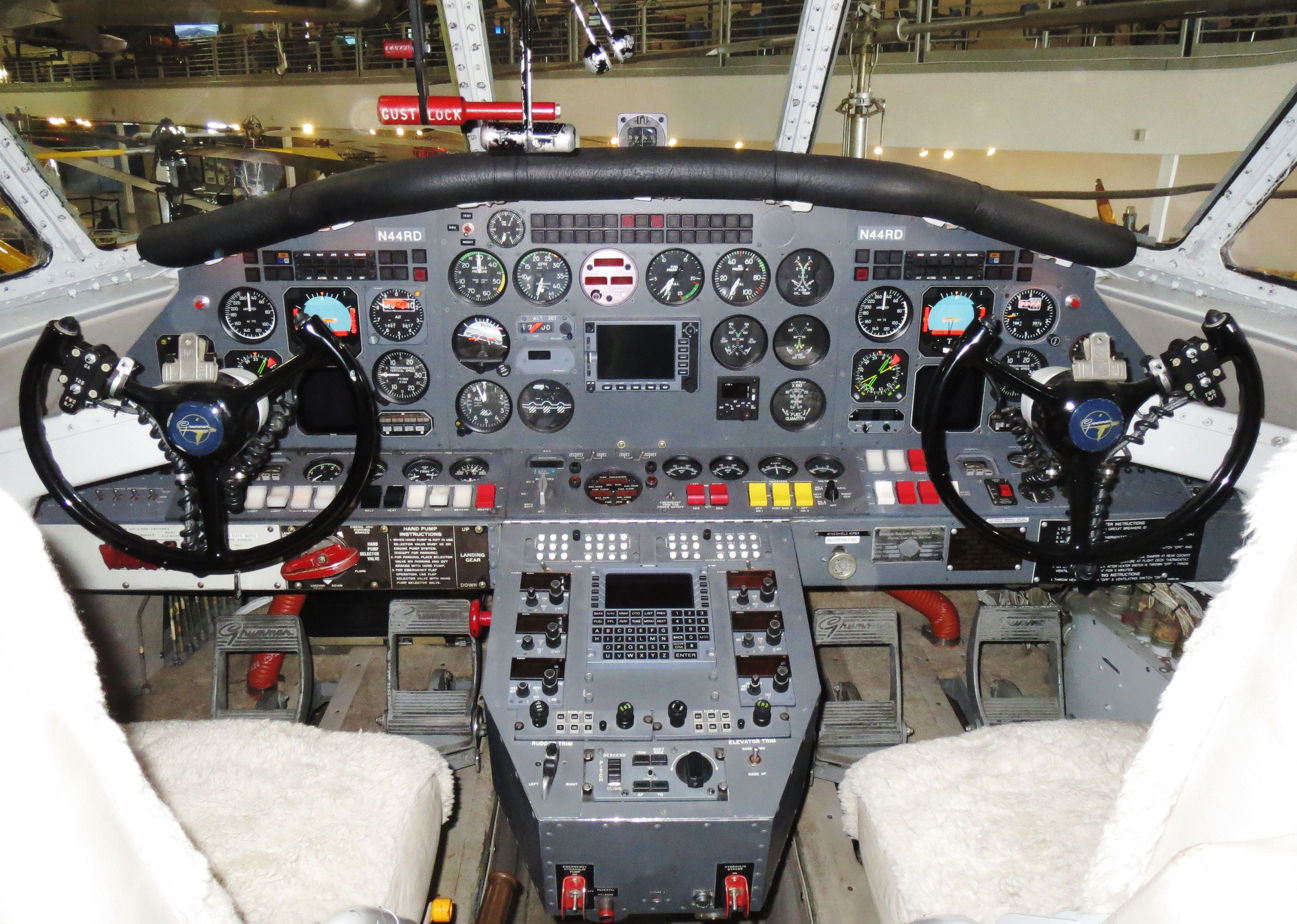
Cockpit of Grumman Albatross N44RD, which flew around the world in 1997

Satellite technology company Row 44, now known as Anuvu, bought an HU-16B Albatross (registration N44HQ) in 2008 to test its in-flight satellite broadband internet service. Named Albatross One, the company selected the aircraft for its operations because it has the same curvature atop its fuselage as the Boeing 737 aircraft for which the company manufactures its equipment. The plane purchased by Row 44 was used at one time as a training aircraft for space shuttle astronauts by NASA. It features the autographs of the astronauts who trained aboard the plane on one of the cabin walls.

In 1997, a Grumman Albatross (N44RD), piloted by Reid Dennis and Andy Macfie, became the first Albatross to circumnavigate the globe. The 26,347 adj=on flight around the world lasted 73 days, included 38 stops in 21 countries, and was completed with 190 hours of flight time. In 2013 Reid Dennis donated N44RD to the Hiller Aviation Museum.

Since the aircraft weighs over 12,500 pounds, pilots of civilian US-registered Albatross aircraft must have a type rating. A yearly Albatross fly-in is held at Boulder City, Nevada, where Albatross pilots can become type rated.

== Variants ==
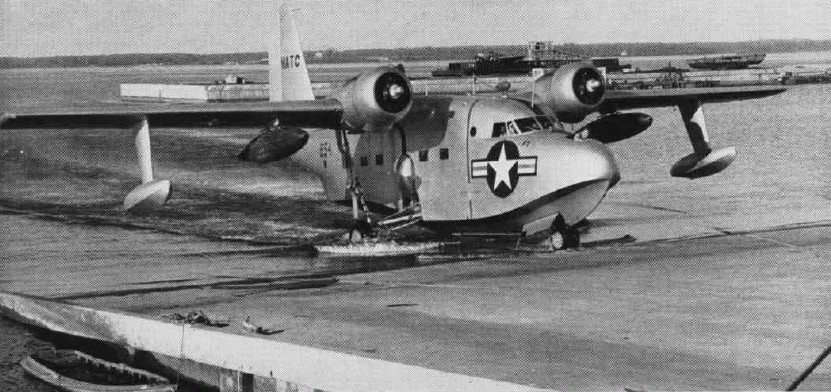
An XJR2F-1 prototype at NAS Patuxent River in the 1940s

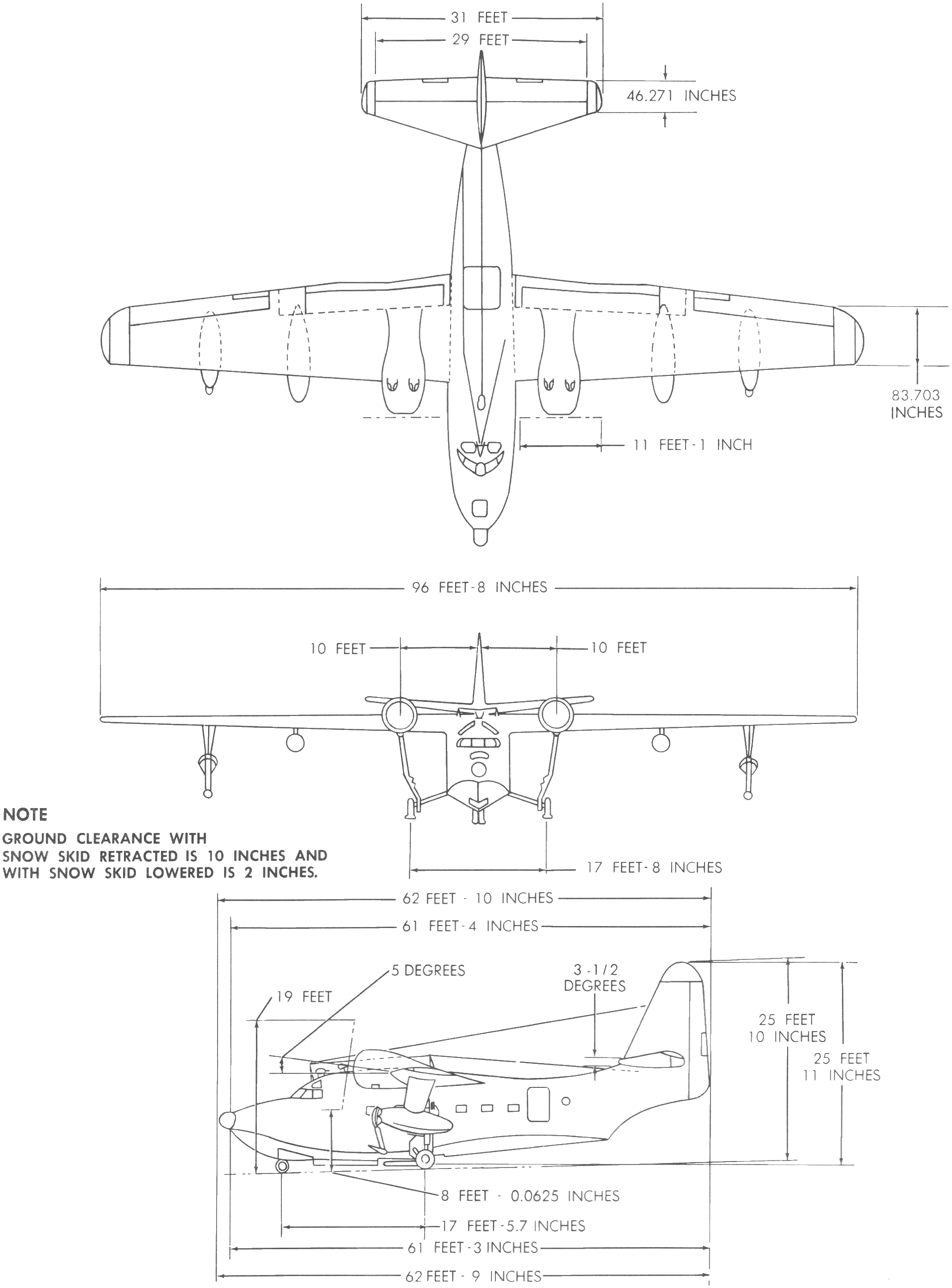
Some SA-16s were equipped with skis on the pontoons and a retractable keel in the hull as part of a "triphibian" system that allowed them to operate off of land, water or snow

=== Company ===
G-64
Company designation for UF-1/SA-16A
G-88
Proposed anti-submarine warfare development of UF-2
G-106
Proposed development of UF-2
G-111
Company designation for UF-2/SA-16B
G-191
Aircraft for Germany
G-231
CSR-110 aircraft for Germany
G-234
UF-2G for U.S. Coast Guard and Argentina
G-251
Anti-submarine warfare aircraft
G-262
Aircraft for Japan
G-270
UF-2G for U.S. Coast Guard
G-288
UF-2G for U.S. Coast Guard
G-315
SHU-16B for Chile
G-333
UF-2 for Argentina
G-340
SHU-16B for Peru
G-341
SHU-16B for Spain

=== Military ===
XJR2F-1
Prototype designation, two built. Initially known as the "Pelican".
HU-16A
USAF version. Originally designated SA-16A.
HU-16A
Indonesian version. Originally designated UF-1.
HU-16B
USAF version modified with long wing. Originally designated SA-16B.
SHU-16B
Export version, modified HU-16B for Anti-Submarine Warfare. Featured an AN/APS-88 in the nose and MAD boom in the tail
HU-16C
US Navy version. Originally designated UF-1.
LU-16C
US Navy version equipped with skis. Originally designated UF-1L.
TU-16C
US Navy version used as navigation trainers. Originally designated UF-1T.
HU-16D
US Navy version modified with long wing. Originally designated UF-1.
HU-16D
German version built with long wing. Originally designated UF-2.
HU-16E
US Coast Guard version modified with long wing. Originally designated UF-2G.
HU-16E
USAF version modified with long wing. Originally designated SA-16A.
G-111
Civil airline version derived from USAF, JASDF, and German originals
PF-1
Maritime patrol version
CSR-110
RCAF version
G-111T
Proposed new builds with modern avionics and turboprop engines.
S-16
Brazilian Air Force designation of the HU-16A. Originally designated A-16, U-16, and later M-16.
AD.1
Spanish Air Force designation for the HU-16.

== Operators ==
Argentina

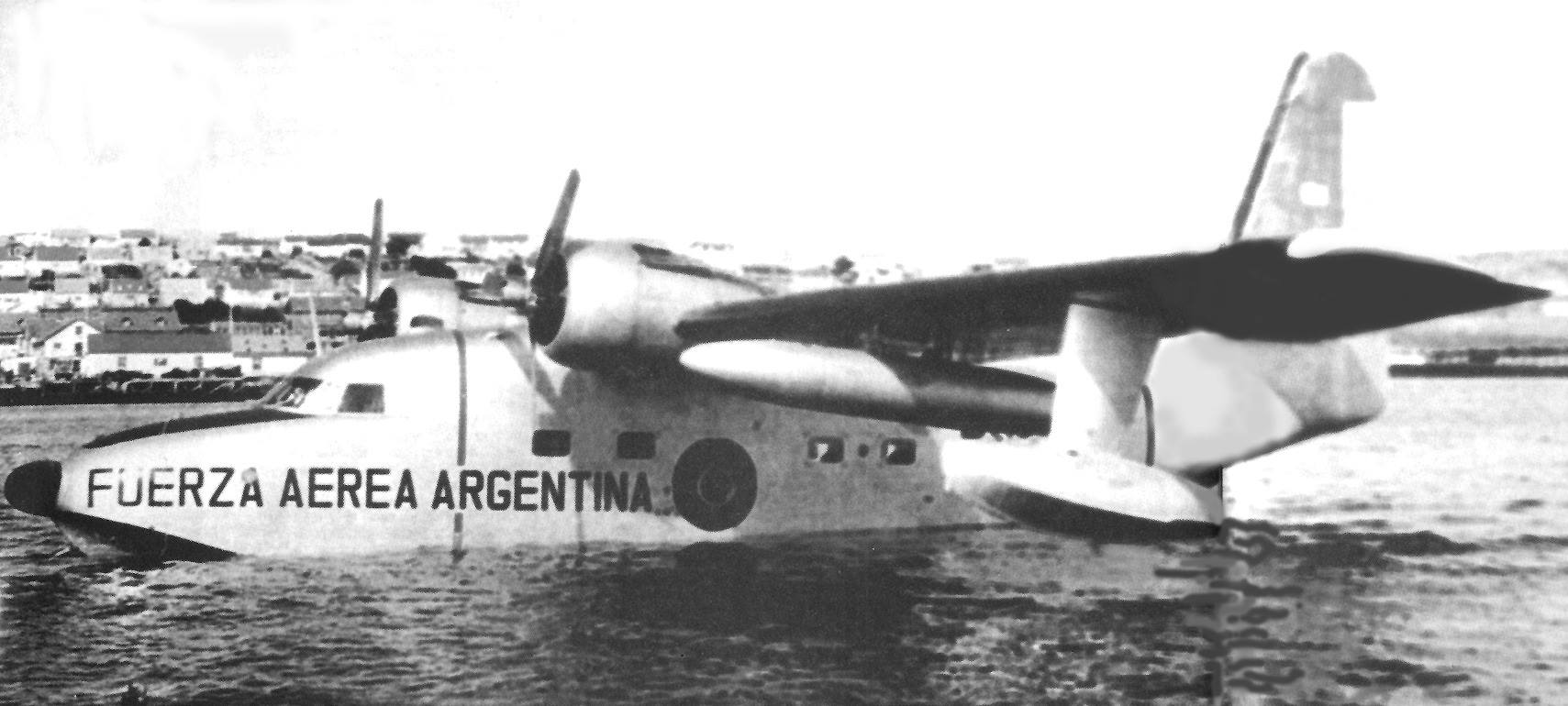
HU-16B of the Argentine Air Force, LADE 1st flight to Port Stanley, 1972

- Argentine Air Force - 3 aircraft.
- Argentine Naval Aviation - 4 aircraft.
  - 2nd Propositos Generales Squadron
  - Escuadrilla Aeronaval de Busqueda y Salvamento

Brazil

- Brazilian Air Force

Canada

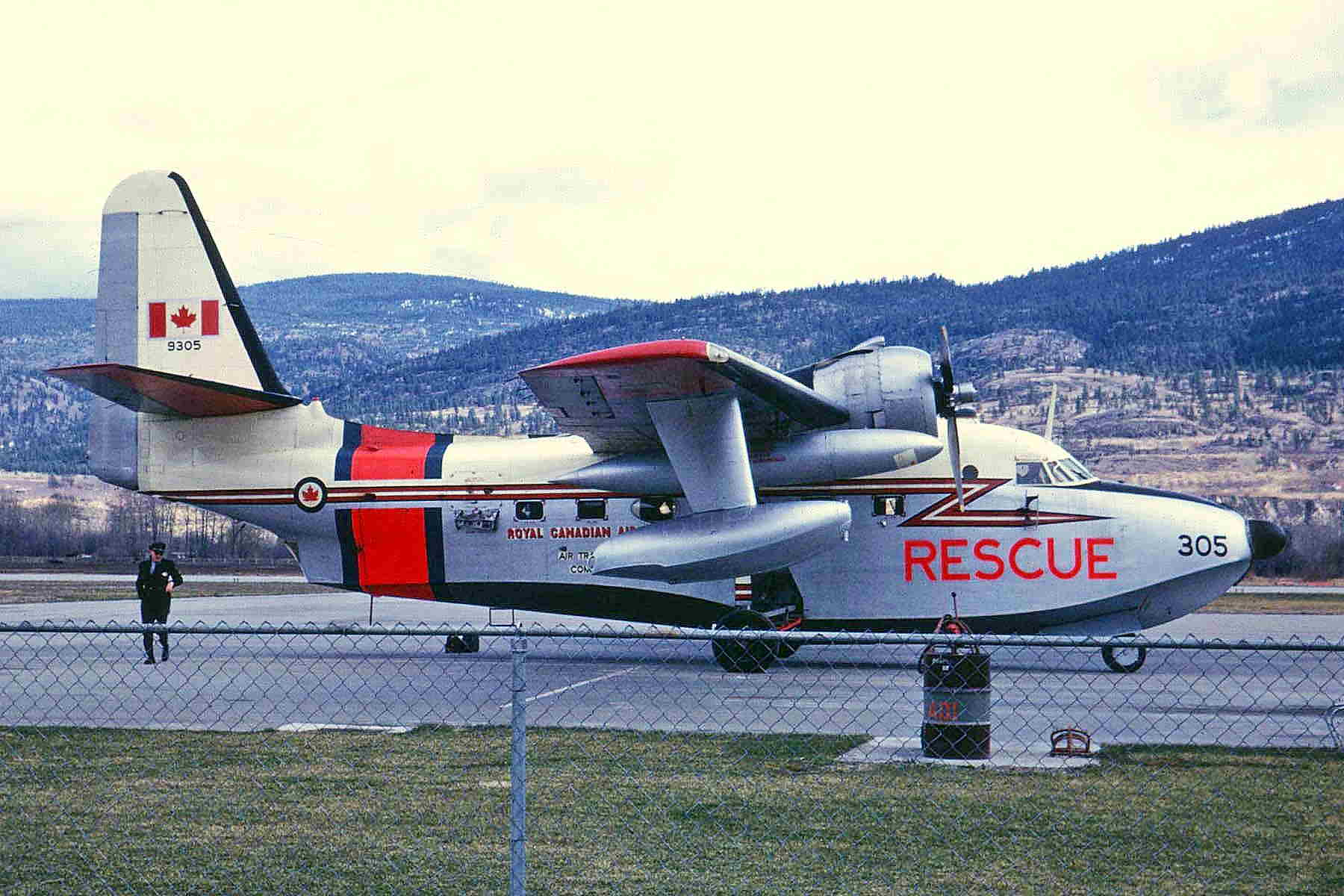
A Grumman Albatross of the RCAF

- International Test Pilots School
- Royal Canadian Air Force
  - 442 Transport and Rescue Squadron

Chile

- Chilean Air Force
  - 2nd Group

Republic of China

- Republic of China Air Force

Germany

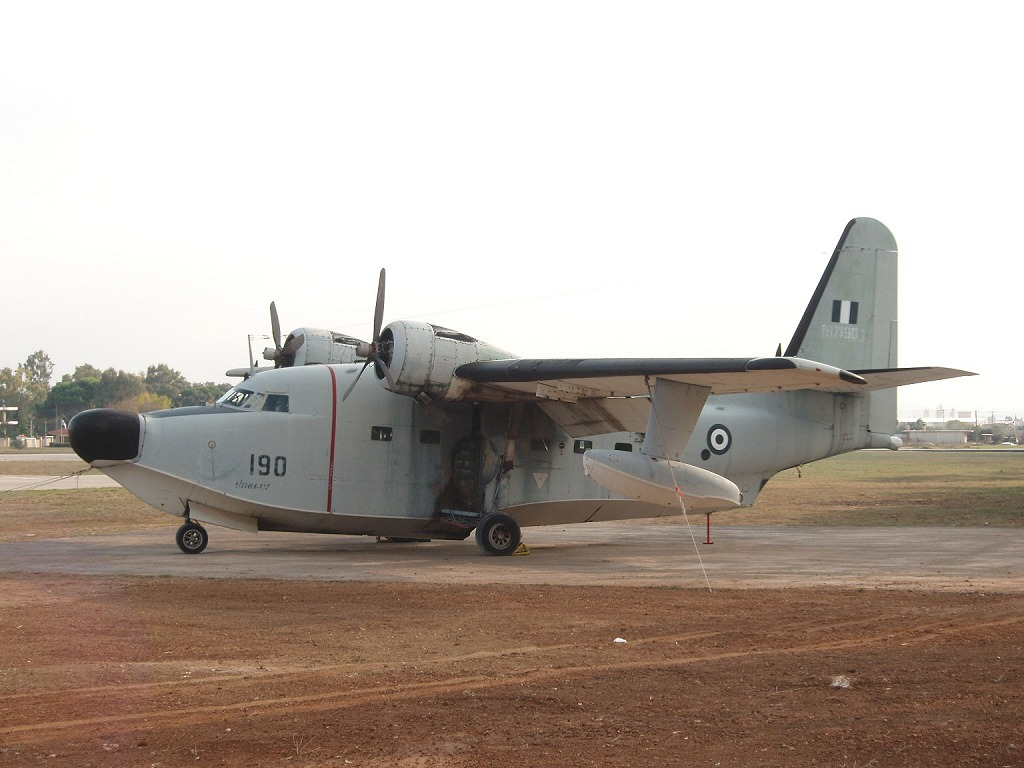
Preserved Hellenic AF aircraft at Dekelia AB.

- German Navy
  - Marinefliegergeschwader 5

Greece

- Hellenic Air Force
  - 353 Naval Cooperation Squadron

Indonesia

- Indonesian Navy
- Indonesian Air Force
- Airfast Indonesia
- Dirgantara Air Service
- Pelita Air

Italy

- Italian Air Force
  - 140th Squadron

Japan

- Japan Maritime Self-Defense Force

Malaysia

- Royal Malaysian Air Force

Mexico

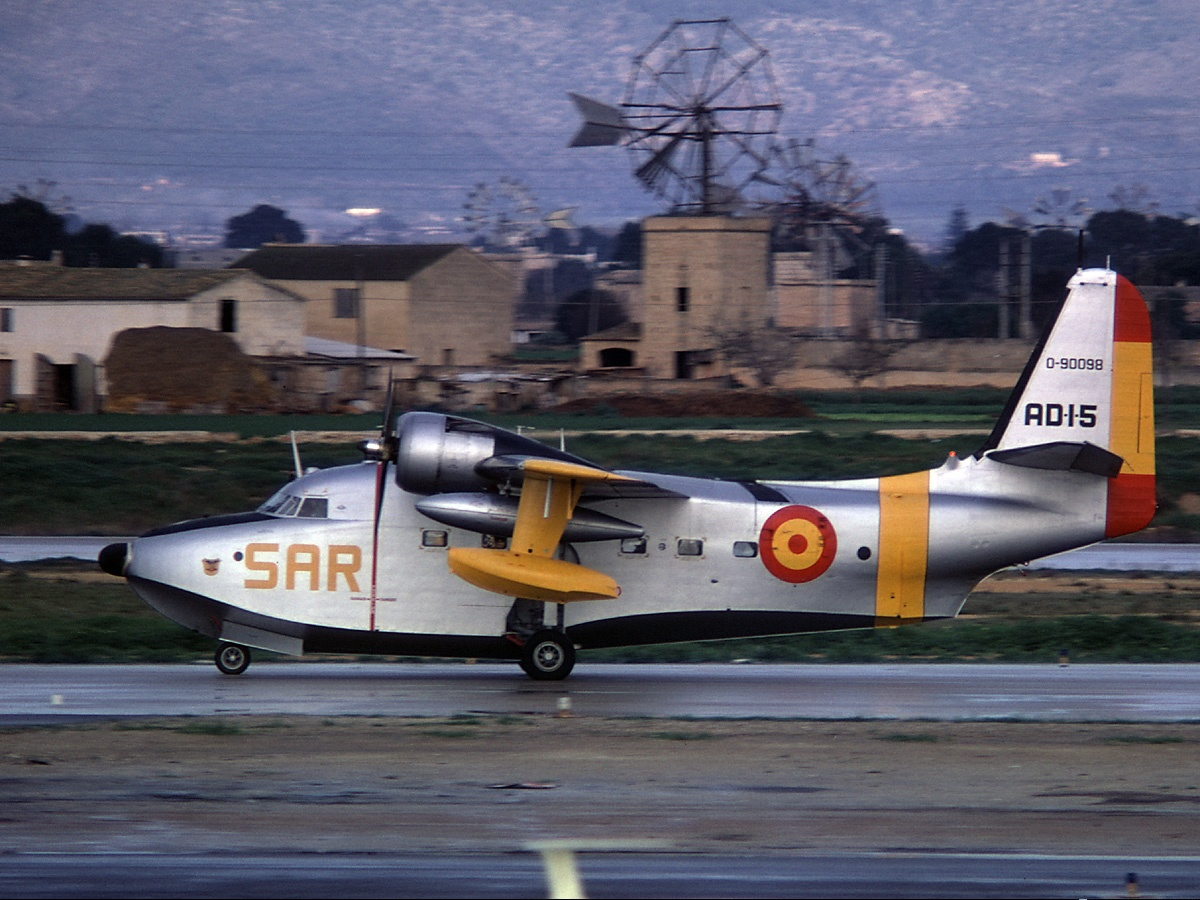
A Spanish HU-16

- Mexican Navy
  - 3rd Naval Air Squadron

Norway

- Royal Norwegian Air Force
  - No. 330 Squadron
  - No. 333 Squadron

Pakistan

- Pakistan Air Force
  - No. 4 Squadron
  - No. 12 Squadron

Peru

- Peruvian Air Force
  - 31st Group

Philippines

- Philippine Air Force
  - 27th SAR and Reconnaissance Squadron

Portugal

- Portuguese Air Force
  - 4th Squadron

Spain

- Spanish Air Force
  - 206 Squadron
  - 801 Squadron
  - 802 Squadron

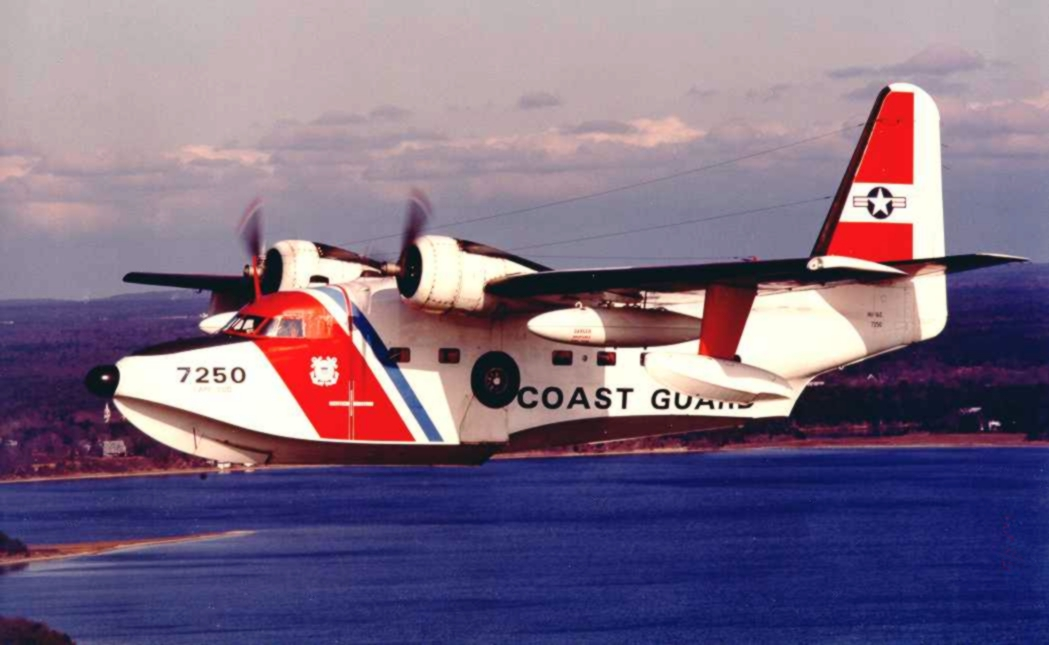
U.S. Coast Guard HU-16E from CGAS Cape Cod in the 1970s.

Thailand

- Royal Thai Navy

United States

- United States Air Force
  - 2nd Air Rescue Squadron
  - 3rd Air Rescue Squadron
  - 7th Air Rescue Squadron
  - 12th Air Rescue Squadron
  - 53rd Air Rescue Squadron
  - 57th Air Rescue Squadron
  - 58th Air Rescue Squadron
  - 66th Air Rescue Squadron
  - 67th Air Rescue Squadron
  - 68th Air Rescue Squadron
  - 81st Air Rescue Squadron
  - 82nd Air Rescue Squadron
  - 83rd Air Rescue Squadron
  - 84th Air Rescue Squadron
  - 580th Air Resupply and Communications Wing
  - 581st Air Resupply and Communications Wing
  - 582nd Air Resupply and Communications Wing
- United States Coast Guard
- United States Navy
  - Antarctic Development Squadron Six

== Accidents and incidents ==
- On 24 January 1952, SA-16A Albatross, 51-001, c/n G-74, of the 580th Wing of the Air Resupply And Communications Service (described as a Central Intelligence Agency air unit), on cross-country flight from Mountain Home AFB, Idaho, to San Diego, California, suffered failure of the port engine over Death Valley. The crew of six successfully bailed out around 18:30. Two were injured upon landing and stayed where they were, while the other four walked south some 14 miles (23 km) to Furnace Creek, California. An SAR team returned to the landing spot and retrieved the injured two and all six were picked up the following day by an SA-16 from the 42nd Air Rescue Squadron, March AFB, California. The abandoned SA-16 crashed into Towne Summit mountain ridge of the Panamint Range west of Stovepipe Wells with the starboard engine still running. The wreckage is still there.
- On 16 May 1952, a USN Grumman Albatross attached to the Iceland Defense Force crashed on Eyjafjallajökull in Iceland. Due to bad weather conditions, rescuers did not make it to the crash site until two-and-a-half days later. One crew member was found dead in the wreckage, but the other four were not found despite extensive search. Evidence on scene suggested that they had tried to deploy the emergency radio, but most likely failed due to very poor weather conditions, and then tried to walk down the glacier. In 1964, partial remains of one of the crewmembers along with an engraved wedding ring were found at the rim of the glacier. On 20 August 1966, the remains of the three remaining crew members were found at a similar location.
- On 18 May 1957, USCG HU-16E Albatross, Coast Guard 1278, stalled and crashed during a JATO demonstration during the Armed Forces Day display at Coast Guard Air Station Salem. The pilot and another crewman were killed. The stall was caused by pilot error.
- On 22 August 1957, U.SCG HU-16E Albatross, Coast Guard 1259, crashed during takeoff at Floyd Bennett Field, killing four of the six crew on board. The aircraft had just completed an inspection in which the control columns were removed and inspected for fatigue cracks. Although not proven, poor maintenance during the reinstallation of the control columns is believed to have led to the crash.
- On 3 July 1964, USCG HU-16E Albatross, Coast Guard 7233, was lost along with all five crew members as it returned from a search for a missing fishing boat. Two days later, the wreckage was found on a mountainside, 3 miles (4.8 km) from its base at Air Station Annette, Alaska.
- On 18 June 1965, on the first Operation Arc Light mission flown by B-52 Stratofortresses of Strategic Air Command to hit a target in South Vietnam, two aircraft collided in the darkness. Eight crew were killed, but four survivors were located and picked up by an HU-16A-GR Albatross amphibian, AF serial number 51-5287. The Albatross was damaged on take-off by a heavy sea state, and those on board had to transfer to a Norwegian freighter and a Navy vessel, the aircraft sinking thereafter.
- On 9 January 1966, a Republic of China Air Force HU-16 carrying three mainland Chinese naval defectors, two officers of the Defense Ministry, and four officers of the Matsu Defense Command, was shot down by communist MiGs over the Taiwan Straits, just hours after they had surrendered their landing ship and asked for asylum. The Albatross was attacked just 15 minutes after departing the island of Matsu on a 135-mile (217 km) flight to Taipei. According to a U.S. Defense Department announcement, the attack was a swift—and perhaps intentional—retribution for the communist sailors who killed seven fellow crew members during their predawn escape to freedom.
- On 23 April 1966, a RCAF Grumman CSR-110 Albatross (9302) serving with No. 121 Composite Unit (KU) at RCAF Station Comox, BC, crashed on the Hope Slide near Hope, BC. It was the only RCAF Albatross loss. Five of the six crew members died (Squadron Leader J. Braiden, Flying Officer Christopher J. Cormier, Leading Aircraftsman Robert L. McNaughton, Flight Lieutenant Phillip L. Montgomery, and Flight Lieutenant Peter Semak). Flying Officer Bob Reid was the sole survivor. A portion of the wreckage is still visible and can be hiked to.
- On 18 January 1967, a Grumman HU-16A Albatross operated by the Air Force of the Republic of Indonesia (AURI), military registration 302, en route to Malang-Abdul Rachman Saleh Airport (MLG/WARA), was reported as missing with the loss of all 19 occupants onboard.
- On 5 March 1967, USCG HU-16E Albatross, Coast Guard 1240, c/n G-61, out of Coast Guard Air Station St. Petersburg, Florida, deployed to drop a dewatering pump to a sinking 40-foot (12 m) yacht, Flying Fish, in the Gulf of Mexico off of Carrabelle, Florida. Shortly after making a low pass behind the sinking vessel to drop the pump, the flying boat crashed a short distance away, with loss of all six crew. The vessel's crew heard a loud crash, but could see nothing owing to fog. The submerged wreck was not identified until 2006.
- On 15 June 1967, USCG HU-16E Albatross, Coast Guard 7237, was based at Coast Guard Air Station Annette Island, in Alaska. The crew was searching near Sloko Lake, British Columbia, Canada, for a missing light plane. The pilot began following the river up to Sloko Lake, intending to turn around at the lake and fly back out of the valley. The co-pilot called for a right turn, but for some reason, the plane went left. According to reports, the co-pilot shouted, “Come right! Come right!” The plane hit the mountain and burst into flames. The three observers in the back were able to get clear of the wreckage, and reported seeing an intense fire engulf the front half of the aircraft. Pilot Lt. Robert Brown, co-pilot Lt. David Bain, and radio operator AT2 Robert Striff, Jr., however, were killed. The wreckage can still be seen on the side of the mountain in Atlin Provincial Park.
- On 7 August 1967, USCG HU-16E Albatross, Coast Guard 2128, c/n G-355, (ex-USAF SA-16A, 52-128), out of CGAS San Francisco, returning from a search mission for an overdue private cabin cruiser Misty (which had run out of fuel) in the Pacific Ocean off of San Luis Obispo, struck a slope of Mount Mars near the Monterey-San Luis Obispo County line, about 0.5 miles (0.80 km) east of Highway 1. The airframe broke in two, killing two crew immediately and injuring four others, with one dying in the hospital several days later.
- On 21 September 1973, U.S. Coast Guard HU-16E Albatross, Coast Guard 2123, was lost over the Gulf of Mexico. The crew was dropping flares over a search area when one flare ignited inside the aircraft, incapacitating the pilots, which led the aircraft to enter an uncontrollable spin. All seven on board were killed.
- On 23 January 1986, Indonesian Air Force HU-16A Albatross number IR-0222 crashed into the water at Makassar harbor during an attempted emergency landing. Five out of 8 crew were killed in the accident. The wreckage also blocked the harbor and delaying a Pelni liner from docking.
- On 5 November 2009, Albatross N120FB of Albatross Adventures crashed shortly after take-off from St. Lucie County International Airport, Fort Pierce, Florida. An engine failed shortly after take-off; the aircraft was damaged beyond economic repair.

== Aircraft on display ==
=== Argentina ===
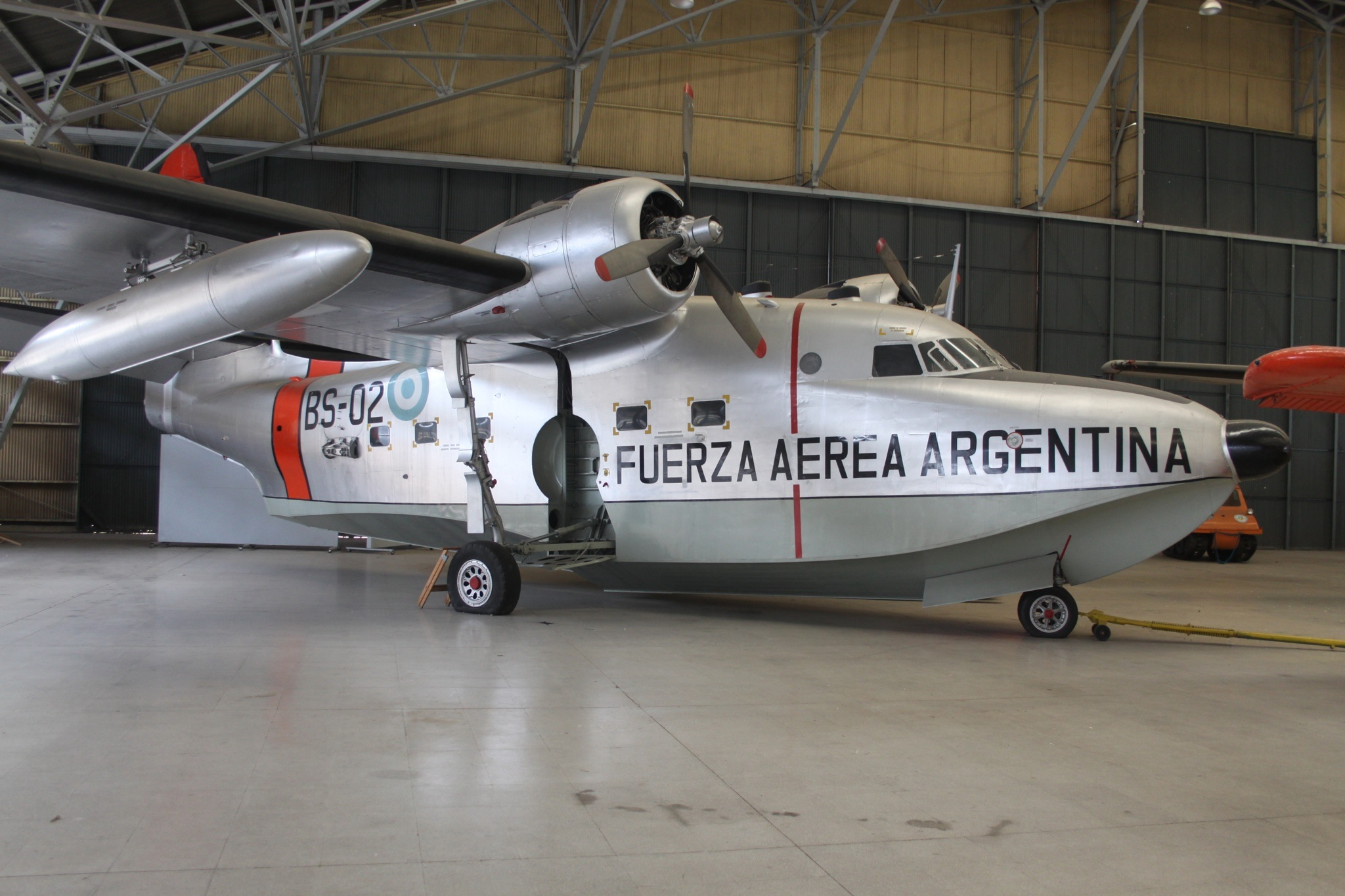
BS-02, Museo Nacional de Aeronáutica de Argentina

- BS-02 – HU-16B on static display at the Museo Nacional de Aeronáutica at Moron, Buenos Aires.
- BS-03 – HU-16B on static display at the Museo Aviación Naval in Buenos Aires. Displayed as Argentine Naval Aviation 4-BS-3.

=== Indonesia ===
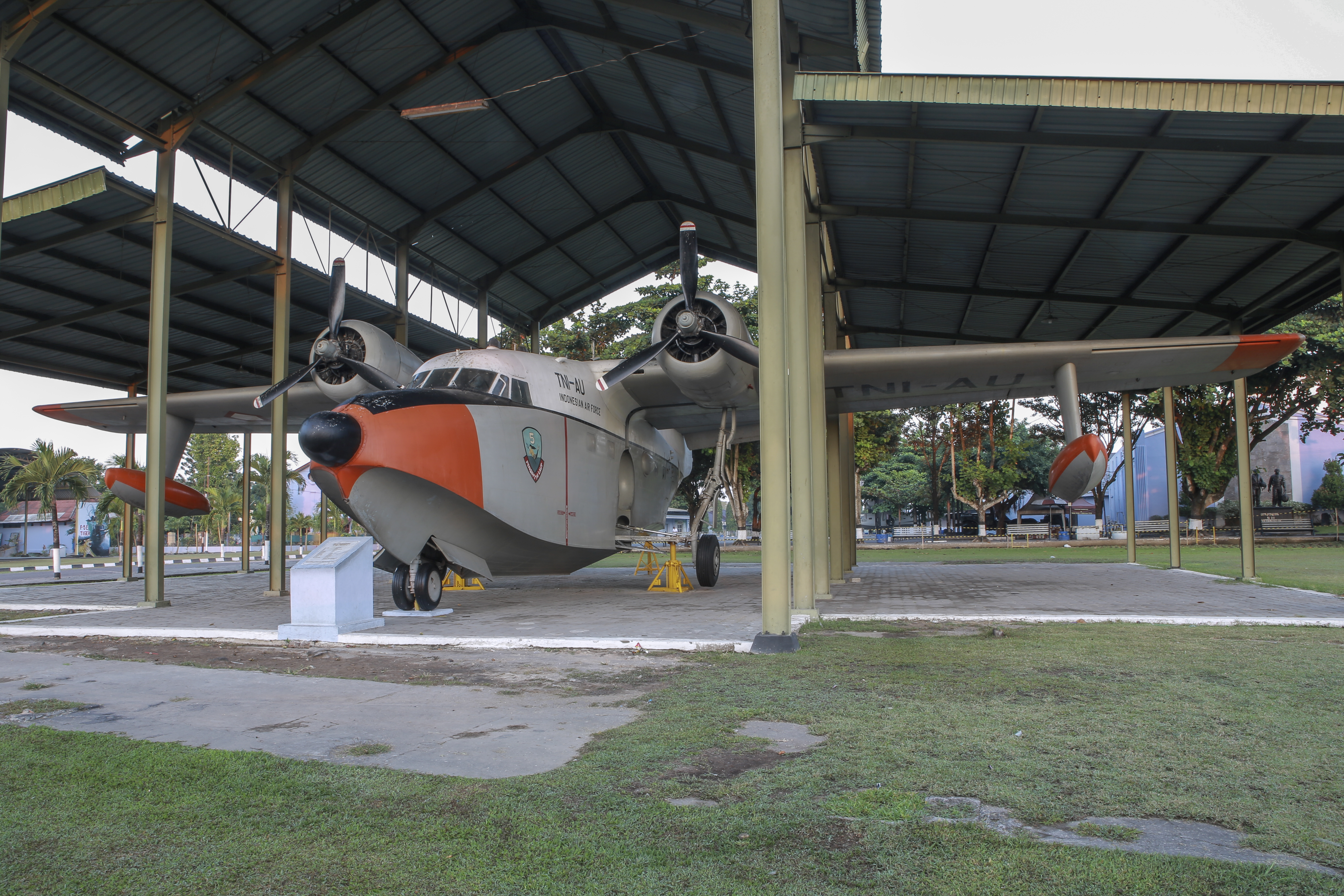
UF-1 Albatross of the Indonesian Air Force at Dirgantara Mandala Museum

- IR-0117 – HU-16A on static display at the Dirgantara Mandala Museum in Sleman Regency, Yogyakarta.
- IR-0220 – HU-16A in storage at Husein Sastranegara International Airport in Bandung, West Java, Indonesia. It was displayed during Bandung Airshow 2017.
- Unknown – HU-16A on static display at Abdul Rachman Saleh Air Force Base in Malang, East Java, Indonesia.

=== Greece ===
- One HU-16B preserved at the Hellenic Air Force Museum, Dekelia Air Base No 190 (51-7190), formerly of the Hellenic AF 353 Maritime Patrol Squadron

=== Italy ===
- MM50-174 – HU-16A on static display at Cameri Airport in Cameri, Piedmont.
- MM50-179 – HU-16A on static display at the Italian Air Force Museum in Vigna di Valle, Lazio.
- MM51-035 – HU-16A on static display at Rome Ciampino Airport in Rome, Lazio.

=== Philippines ===
- 48607 – HU-16A on static display at the Philippine Air Force Aerospace Museum in Pasay, Philippines.

=== Thailand ===
- BuNo 151265 – HU-16B on static display at U-Tapao Royal Thai Navy Airfield in Sattahip, Chonburi.

=== United States ===
- USAF 51-0006 – HU-16B on static display at the Strategic Air Command & Aerospace Museum in Ashland, Nebraska.
- USAF 51-0022 – HU-16A on static display at the Pima Air and Space Museum in Tucson, Arizona.
- USAF 51-7144 – HU-16B on static display at the Museum of Aviation in Warner Robins, Georgia.
- USAF 51-7163 – HU-16B on static display at the Castle Air Museum in Atwater, California.
- USAF 51-7176 – HU-16B on static display at Coast Guard Air Station Clearwater in Clearwater, Florida. It was previously at the Pate Museum of Transportation, until its disassembly and relocation to CGAS Clearwater for restoration. It is marked as USCG 1023.
- USAF 51-7193 – HU-16B on static display at Warfield Air National Guard Base in Baltimore, Maryland.
- USAF 51-7195 – HU-16B on static display at the Yanks Air Museum in Chino, California.
- USAF 51-5282 – HU-16B on static display at the National Museum of the United States Air Force in Dayton, Ohio. This was USAF's last operational HU-16. On 4 July 1973, it established a world record for twin-engined amphibians when it reached 32,883 feet and was transferred to the Air Force Museum two weeks later.
- USAF 51-5291 – HU-16B on static display at the Pima Air & Space Museum in Tucson, Arizona.
- BuNo 137928 Hemisphere Dancer – HU-16C on static display at Universal Studios in Orlando, Florida. It was previously owned by musician and pilot Jimmy Buffett.
- BuNo 137932 – HU-16C on static display at the Hiller Aviation Museum in San Carlos, California. It was flown around the world by Reid W. Dennis in 1997.
- USCG 7209 – HU-16E on static display at the Aerospace Museum of California in Sacramento, California.
- USCG 7216 – HU-16E on static display with the Historic Aircraft Restoration Project at Floyd Bennett Field in New York, New York.
- USCG 7228 – HU-16E on static display at the New England Air Museum in Windsor Locks, Connecticut.
- USCG 7236 – HU-16E on static display at the National Naval Aviation Museum in Pensacola, Florida.
- USCG 7245 – HU-16E on static display at the Pacific Coast Air Museum in Santa Rosa, California.
- USCG 7247 – HU-16E on static display at Coast Guard Air Station Elizabeth City in Elizabeth City, North Carolina.
- USCG 7250 – HU-16E on static display at Coast Guard Air Station Cape Cod in Mashpee, Massachusetts.
- USCG 7251 – HU-16E on static display at the Dyess Linear Air Park at Dyess Air Force Base in Abilene, Texas.
- USCG 7254 – HU-16E on static display at the Travis Air Force Base Aviation Museum at Travis Air Force Base in Fairfield, California.
- USCG 1280 – HU-16E on static display at Kirtland Air Force Base in Albuquerque, New Mexico.
- USCG 1293 – HU-16E on static display at the March Field Air Museum in Riverside, California.
- USCG 2129 – HU-16E on static display at Battleship Memorial Park in Mobile, Alabama.

== Specifications (HU-16B) ==
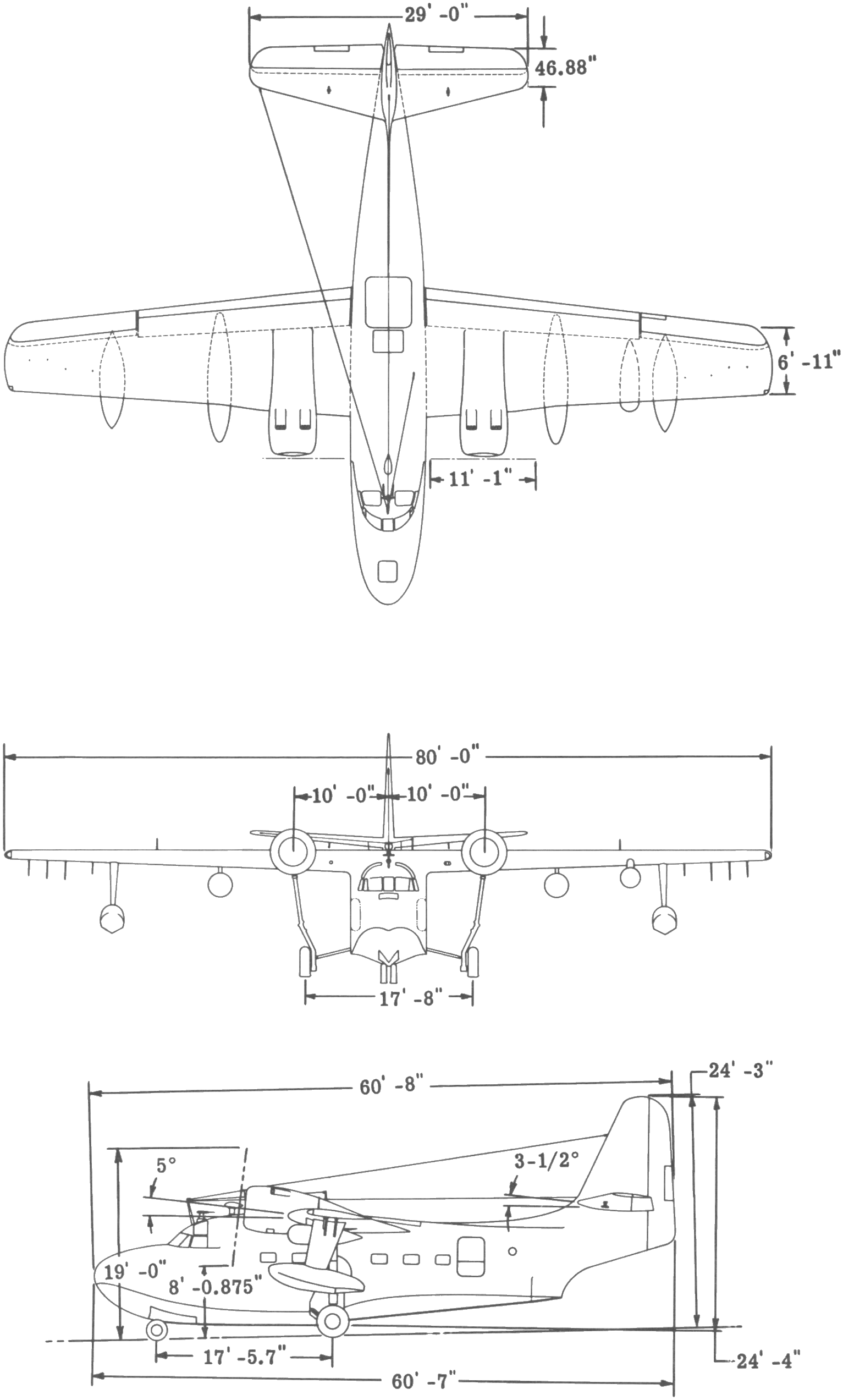
3-view line drawing of the Grumman SA-16A Albatross

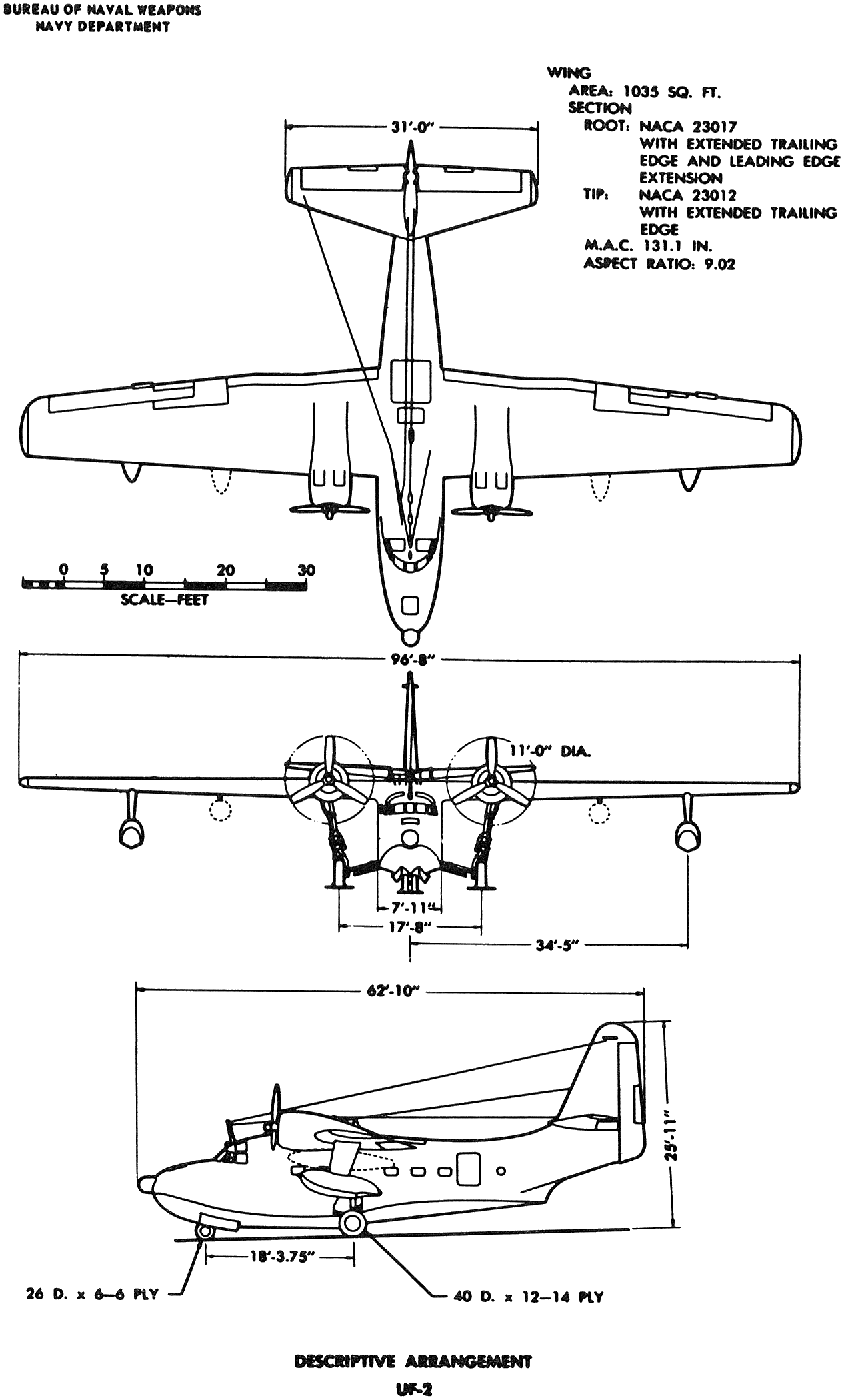
3-view line drawing of the Grumman UF-2 Albatross

Data from Albatross: Amphibious Airborne Angel, United States Navy Aircraft since 1911, Jane's All the World's Aircraft 1958-59 Grumman Albatross: A History of the Legendary Seaplane

General characteristics

- Crew: 4-6
- Capacity: 10 passengers
- Length: 62 ft 10 in (19.15 m)
- Wingspan: 96 ft 8 in (29.46 m)
- Height: 25 ft 10 in (7.87 m)
- Wing area: 1,035 sq ft (96.2 m^{2})
- Airfoil: NACA 23017
- Empty weight: 22,883 lb (10,380 kg)
- Gross weight: 30,353 lb (13,768 kg)
- Max takeoff weight: 37,500 lb (17,010 kg)
- Fuel capacity: 675 US gal (562.1 imp gal; 2,555.2 L) internal fuel + 400 US gal (333.1 imp gal; 1,514.2 L) in wingtip floats + two 300 US gal (249.8 imp gal; 1,135.6 L) drop tanks
- Powerplant: 2 × Wright R-1820-76A Cyclone 9 nine-cylinder air-cooled radial piston engines, 1,425 hp (1,063 kW) each for take-off

1,275 hp (951 kW) normal rating from sea level to 3,000 ft (914 m)

- Propellers: 3-bladed Hamilton Standard constant-speed fully-feathering reversible-pitch propellers

Performance

- Maximum speed: 236 mph (380 km/h, 205 kn)
- Cruise speed: 124 mph (200 km/h, 108 kn)
- Stall speed: 74 mph (119 km/h, 64 kn)
- Range: 2,850 mi (4,590 km, 2,480 nmi)
- Service ceiling: 21,500 ft (6,600 m)
- Rate of climb: 1,450 ft/min (7.4 m/s)

Avionics

- Communication:
  - AN/ARC-27 UHF command set
  - AN/ARC-38 HF liaison set
  - AN/ARR-41 HF receiver
  - AN/ART-33 LF transmitter
- Identification:
  - AN/APA-89 coder group (selective identification feature)
  - AN/APX-6, -6B IFF
  - AN/APX-28 IFF interrogator set
- Navigation:
  - AN/ARA-25 UHF direction finder
  - AN/APN-22 radar altimeter
  - AN/APN-59 radio compass
  - AN/APN-70 LORAN
  - AN/ARN-12 marker beacon
  - AN/ARN-14 VOR receiver
  - AN/ARN-18 glide slope
  - AN/ARN-21A TACAN
- Search:
  - AN/APS-31A radar
- Other:
  - AN/AIC-5B intercommunication set
  - AS-401/A trailing antenna

== See also ==
- Aircraft in fiction#Grumman HU-16 Albatross

Related development

- Grumman G-21 Goose
- Grumman G-73 Mallard

Aircraft of comparable role, configuration, and era

- Canadair CL-215
- Consolidated PBY Catalina
