= Grumman G-73 Mallard =

Amphibious airliner in the US

G-73 Mallard
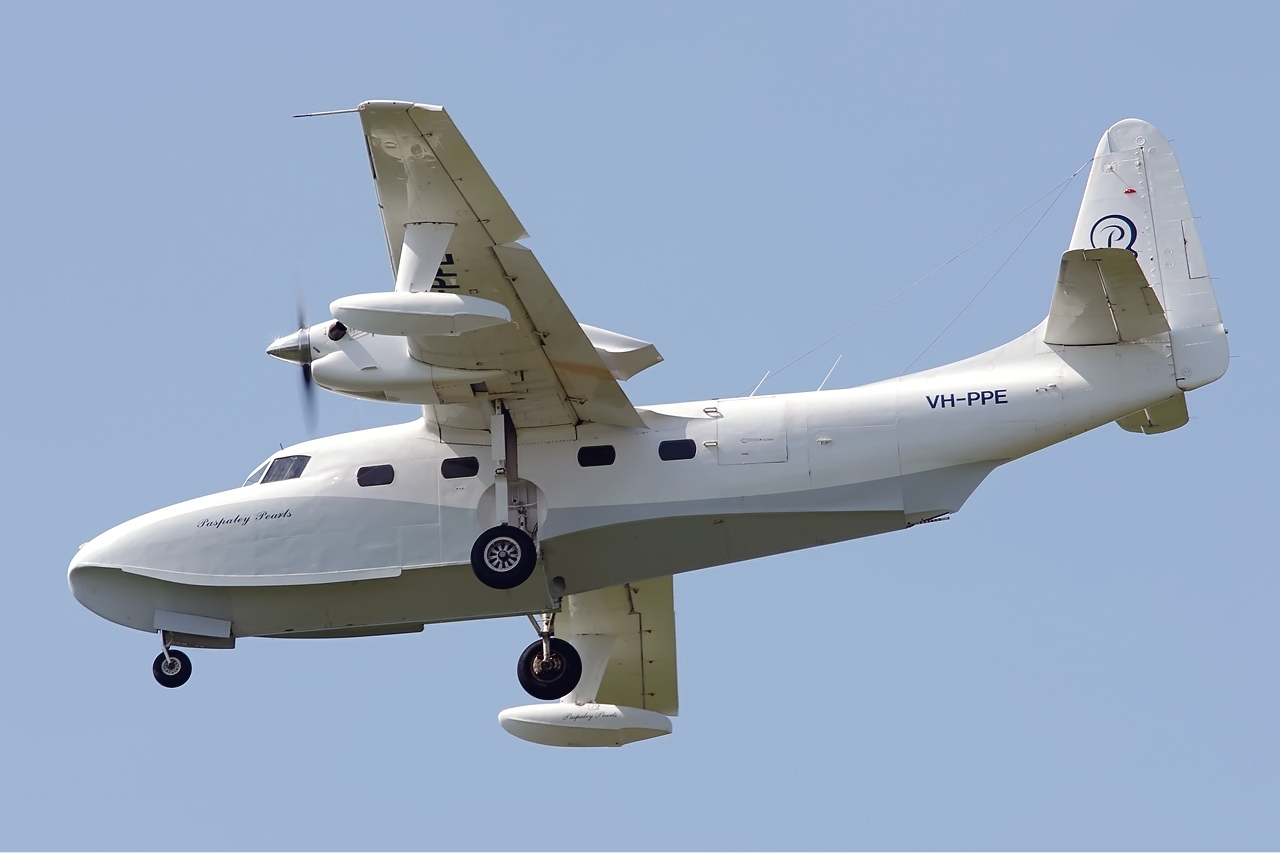
- Grumman G-73T Turbo Mallard of Pearl Aviation landing at Darwin Airport (2010)

General information
- Type: Amphibious airliner
- Manufacturer: Grumman
- Status: In service, mainly private and 3 with Paspaley Pearling Company
- Primary user: Chalk's Ocean Airways (historic)
- Number built: 59

History
- Manufactured: 1946–1951
- First flight: 30 April 1946
- Retired: 19 December 2005 (passenger service)
- Developed into: Grumman HU-16 Albatross

The Grumman G-73 Mallard is a medium, twin-engined amphibious aircraft. Many have been modified by replacing the original Pratt & Whitney Wasp H radial engines with modern turboprop engines. Manufactured from 1946 to 1951, production ended when Grumman's larger SA-16 Albatross was introduced.

== Design and development ==
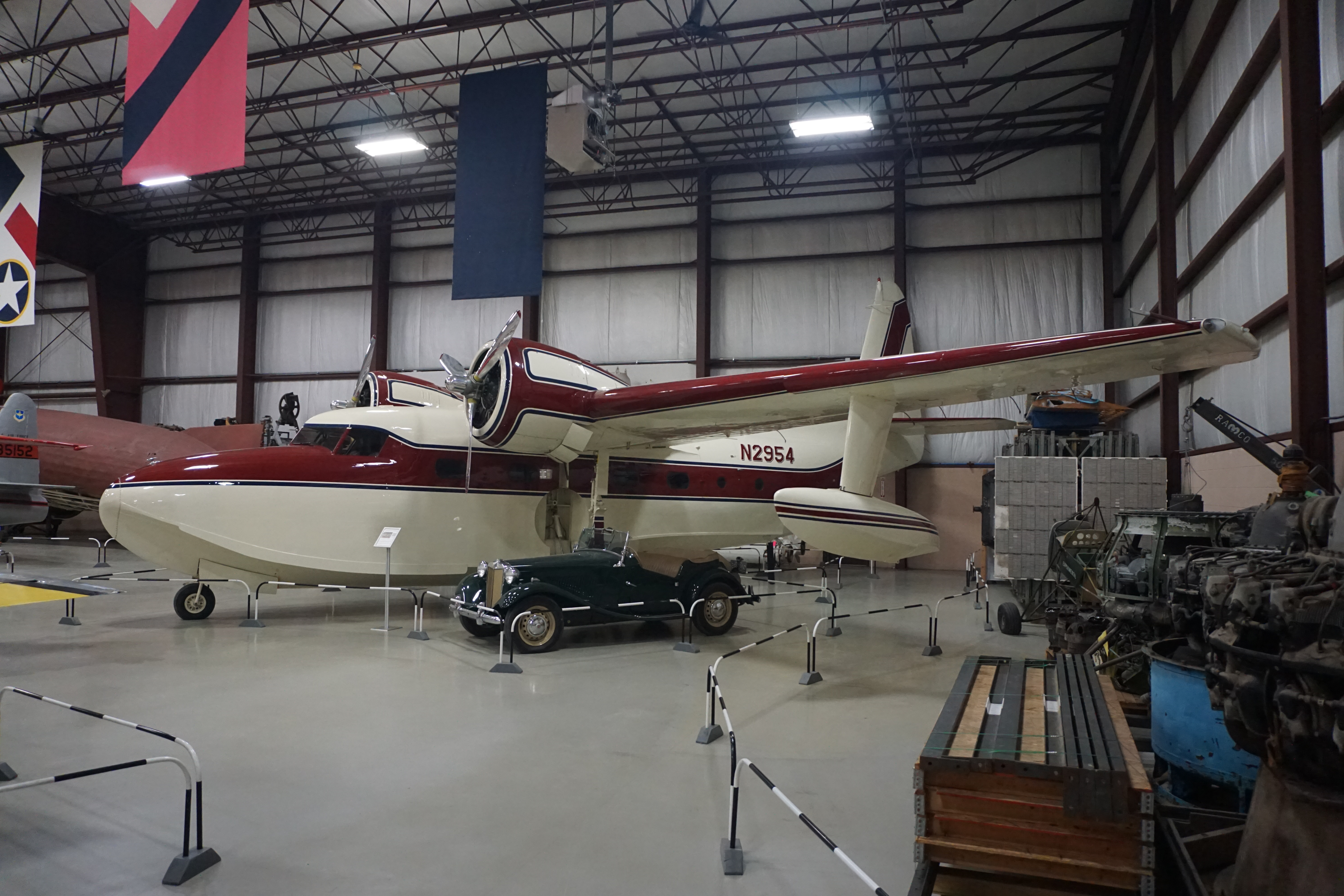
G-73 Mallard at the Air Zoo

Building on the success of the Goose and Widgeon, Grumman Aircraft developed larger G-73 Mallard for commercial use. Retaining many of the features of the smaller aircraft, such as twin radial engines, high wings with underwing floats, retractable landing gear,, and a large, straight tail, the company built 59 Mallards between 1946 and 1951. Unlike the smaller aircraft, the Mallard featured tricycle gear, stressed skin, a two-step hull, and wingtip fuel tanks.

== Operational history ==
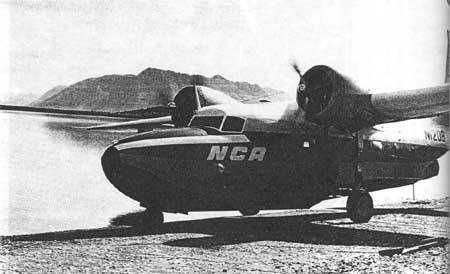
Northern Consolidated Air G-73 Mallard (Katmai National Park & Preserve)

The Mallard prototype first flew on 30 April 1946, with the first production aircraft entering service in September of that year. While the Mallard was designed for regional airline operations with two pilots and 10 passengers, especially aimed at harbor-based, city-to-city hops on the Eastern Seaboard, postwar surplus aircraft sales and the availability of smaller airports limited market potential. A number of smaller air carriers did use the Mallard in its intended role, notably Tahiti-Hawaii Airlines and Pacific Western Airlines (Canada), but most of the 59 Mallards delivered were for corporate use. A prominent user in the United States was Roy Fruehauf and the Fruehauf Trailer Corporation. Fruehauf owned and operated a fishing camp, Killarney Lodge at Georgian Bay, Canada, and ferried customers there from Detroit. Another Detroiter, William Packer of General Motors, also owned a Mallard, which he often flew to Killarney. Another Mallard was purchased in the early 1950s by the Aga Khan.

The Toronto Globe and Mail newspaper owned one for use as a "flying newsroom".

The Royal Egyptian Air Force used a Mallard as part of its Royal Flight; it was reportedly King Farouk's favourite aircraft.

The Mallard received a new lease on life in the 1970s, when a number of airframes were refitted by Frakes Aviation with Pratt & Whitney Canada PT6A turbines and upgraded for 17 passengers, to become "Turbo Mallards". Today, through attrition, only 30 Mallards remain registered in the United States. Many of the rest are in use around the globe.

A similar program has been undertaken by Paspaley Pearling in combination with Aeronautical Engineers Australia to fit new engines and modernize its Mallard fleet, which is used to support its pearling operations in Northern Australia. The fleet has been extensively rebuilt and also refitted with PT6A turbines, and it is currently undergoing a life-extension program.

== Incidents ==
=== Chalk's flight 101 in 2005 ===
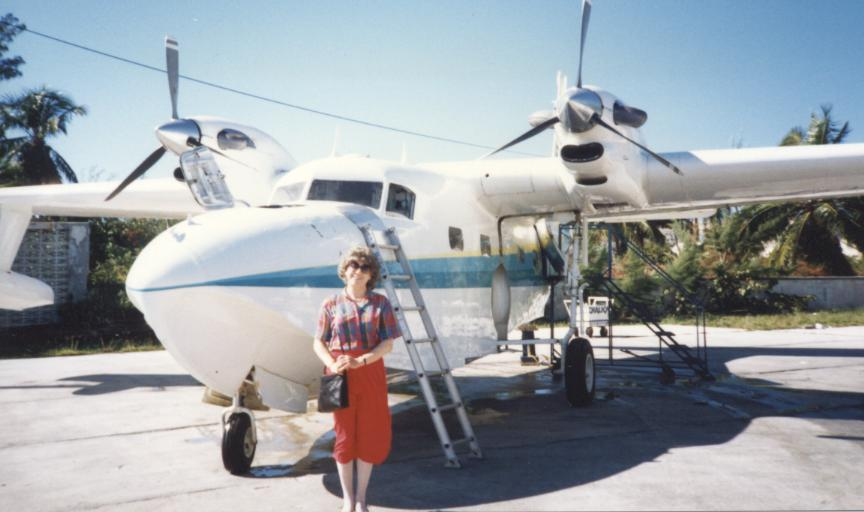
Turbo Mallard of Chalk's International Airline on a scheduled service at Bimini, Bahamas, in November 1989 after arriving from Miami Harbor: This aircraft crashed as Flight 101 in 2005.

Chalk's Ocean Airways purchased Mallard N1208 from the Fruehauf Corporation and later acquired several other examples of the aircraft. The type received much attention after a Turbo Mallard, operating as Chalk's Ocean Airways Flight 101, crashed after takeoff from Miami Harbor on December 19, 2005, bound for Bimini, Bahamas. Eighteen passengers and two crew perished when the right wing separated from the fuselage of the 58-year-old aircraft. The cause of the accident was determined by the subsequent NTSB investigation to be undetected cracks and/or corrosion in the wing spar.

Prior to 2005, Chalk's Ocean Airways had an exemplary safety record operating Mallards for many years between Florida and the Bahamas, having never had a passenger fatality since the company began operations in 1917.

=== Australia Day 2017 at Perth ===
An original radial-engined Mallard, registration VH-CQA, crashed into the Swan River in Perth, Western Australia, on 26 January, 2017, during Australia Day celebrations, killing both the pilot, Peter Lynch, and his passenger. The cause of the accident was listed as pilot error and poor procedures on the part of the CASA and the City of Perth.

== Operators ==
=== Civil operators ===
Australia

- Air Whitsunday (operated both the piston- and turboprop-engined variants)
- Pearl Aviation (Paspaley Pearling Co.)
- Trans Australia Airlines

Canada

- Nordair (Turbo Mallard)
- Pacific Western Airlines

Indonesia

- Indonesian National Police

Netherlands New Guinea

- Nederlandsche Nieuw Guinee Petroleum Maatschappij

United States

- Antilles Air Boats
- Chalk's Ocean Airways (operated both the piston- and turboprop-engined variants)
- Virgin Islands Seaplane Shuttle (operated both the piston- and turboprop-engined variants)

=== Military operators ===
Egypt

- Royal Egyptian Air Force

== Specifications (G-73) ==
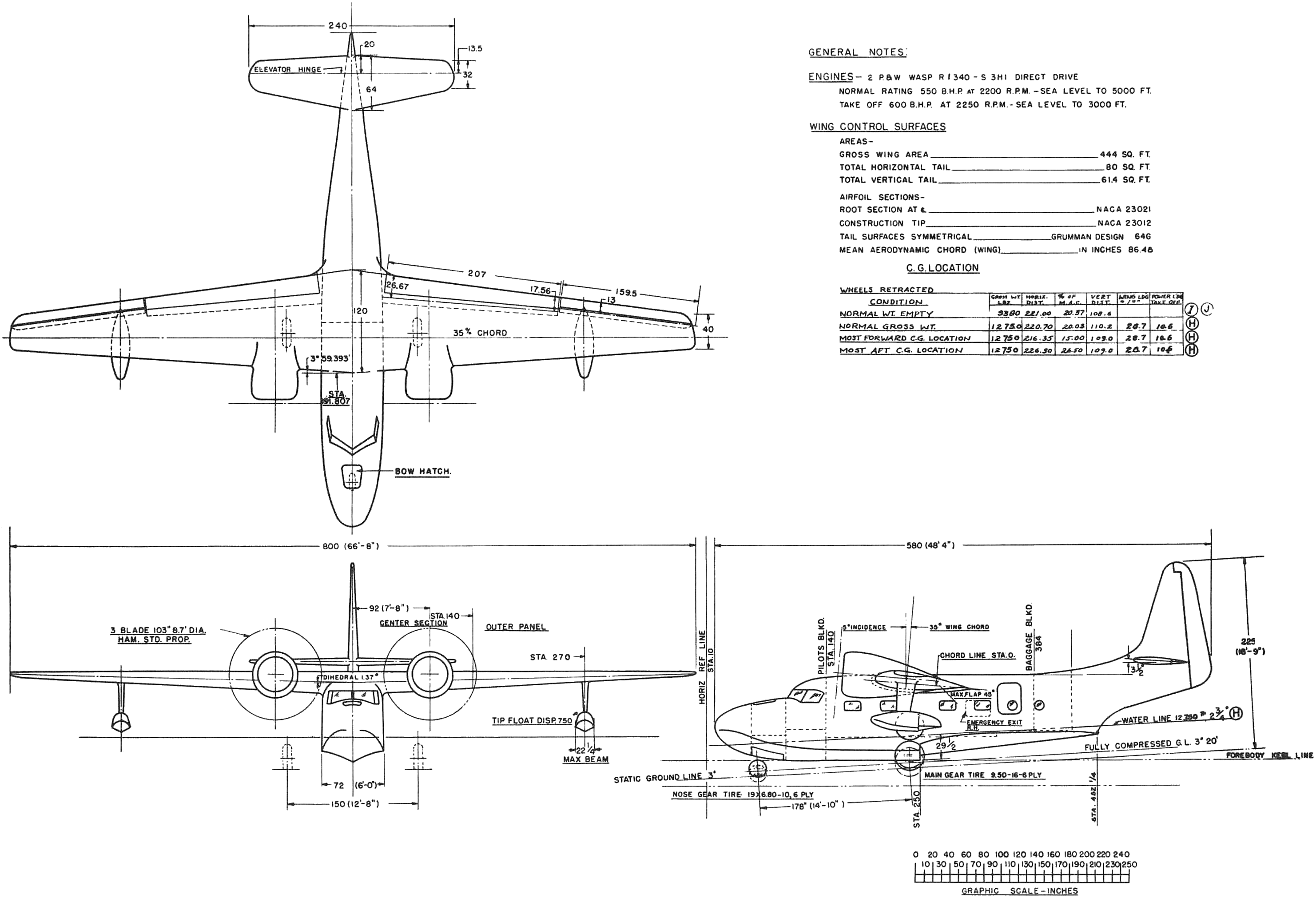
3-view line drawing of the Grumman G-73 Mallard

Data from Jane's All the World's Aircraft 1948

General characteristics

- Crew: two
- Capacity: 10 passengers
- Length: 48 ft 4 in (14.73 m)
- Wingspan: 66 ft 8 in (20.32 m)
- Height: 18 ft 9 in (5.72 m) (on landing gear)
- Wing area: 444 sq ft (41.2 m^{2})
- Empty weight: 9,350 lb (4,241 kg)
- Gross weight: 12,750 lb (5,783 kg)
- Fuel capacity: 380 US gal (320 imp gal; 1,400 L)
- Powerplant: 2 × Pratt & Whitney R-1340-S3H1 9-cylinder air-cooled radial engine, 600 hp (450 kW) each (takeoff power)

Performance

- Maximum speed: 187 kn (215 mph, 346 km/h) at 6,000 ft (1,800 m)
- Cruise speed: 160 kn (180 mph, 290 km/h) at 8,000 ft (2,400 m) (55% power)
- Stall speed: 62 kn (71 mph, 114 km/h)
- Range: 1,200 nmi (1,380 mi, 2,220 km) with 810 lb (370 kg) payload
- Service ceiling: 23,000 ft (7,000 m)
- Rate of climb: 1,290 ft/min (6.6 m/s)

== See also ==
Related development

- Grumman G-21 Goose
- HU-16 Albatross

Aircraft of comparable role, configuration, and era

- PBY Catalina
- Short Sealand

Related lists

- List of flying boats
