= Frakes Aviation =

Frakes Aviation was founded by J. Fred Frakes in the late 1960s, and is located in Cleburne, Texas, United States. When founded, the company's main activity was converting radial engine powered airplanes to gas turbine engines. The company continued operations in this area of aviation into the mid-1980s, converting various airplanes.

Frakes' most significant projects were the re-engineering of two Grumman products, the Ag-Cat and the Mallard, in both cases replacing the original radial piston engines with the Pratt & Whitney Canada PT6A.

The company also converted a number of Aerospatiale Nord 262 airplanes for Mohawk Airlines (later used by Ransome Airlines, an Allegheny Commuter subsidiary airline) in the late 1970s. After long usage by Ransome Airlines at least two of these airplanes were exported to Australia where they were used for a short time before being retired.

In the mid-1980s Frakes Aviation saw a need to diversify their business and ventured into aftermarket exhaust systems for PT6 powered aircraft. As the modification business dwindled the exhaust business began to take hold. Frakes Aviation now holds various supplemental type certificates for exhaust systems on several different airframes.

Further diversifying of their business brought them into the OEM market. Frakes Aviation is now the OEM for exhaust stacks on various newly built aircraft, including the Quest Kodiak and the Epic Dynasty.
