= A Pirate Looks at Fifty =

Book by Jimmy Buffett

- Author: Jimmy Buffett
- Subject: Biography
- Published: 1998 (Random House)
- Publication place: United States
- Media type: Print
- Pages: 458
- ISBN: 0679435271
- Dewey Decimal: 782.42164092
- LC Class: ML420.B874

A Pirate Looks at Fifty is the autobiography of the singer and songwriter Jimmy Buffett, revolving around the singer's fiftieth birthday. The book was released on June 3, 1998. The title alludes to Buffett's 1975 song "A Pirate Looks at Forty".

Buffett chronicles important happenings up to his fiftieth (the beginnings of his career, his plane crash, etc.) and his birthday celebrations - plane hopping in South America and the Caribbean.

The book headed the New York Times Bestseller List for non-fiction in June 1998, making him the sixth author in that list's history to have reached No. 1 on both the fiction and non-fiction lists, along with Ernest Hemingway, Dr. Seuss, John Steinbeck, William Styron and Irving Wallace.
