= Stephen Tyng Mather Home =

Historic house in Connecticut, United States

- U.S. National Register of Historic Places
- U.S. National Historic Landmark
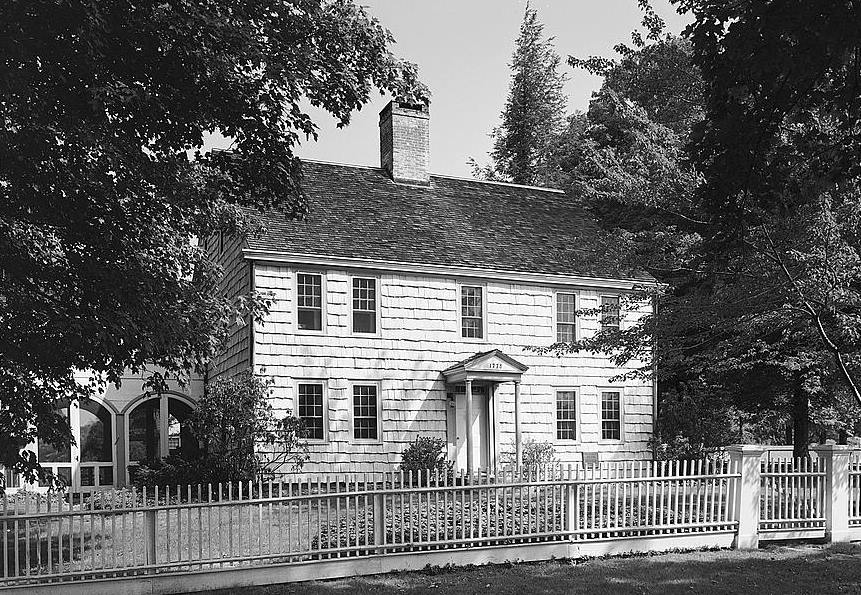

- Location within Connecticut Location within the United States
- Location: 19 Stephen Mather Road, Darien, Connecticut
- Coordinates: 41°6′45″N 73°28′27″W
- Area: 28.5 acres (11.5 ha)
- Built: 1778
- Architect: Deacon Joseph Moses Mather
- NRHP reference No.: 66000877

Significant dates
- Added to NRHP: October 15, 1966
- Designated NHL: November 27, 1963

The Stephen Tyng Mather Home (also referred to as the Mather Homestead) is a historic house and National Historic Landmark at 19 Stephen Mather Road in Darien, Connecticut. It is significant as the longtime family home Stephen Tyng Mather (1867–1930), an industrialist and conservationist who championed the creation of the National Park Service in 1916 and served as its first director. The main house was built in 1778 by his great grandfather, Deacon Mather. Stephen Mather often lived elsewhere, but regarded this house as his true home.

== Description and building history ==
The Mather homestead was built in 1778 by Deacon Joseph Moses Mather. The house he built was a 2 1/2-story wood-frame structure, five bays wide, with a side-gable roof and a central chimney. The interior layout includes a dining room and parlor beside the chimney, and a kitchen behind, flanked by two smaller rooms in the rear corners. The upstairs had a similar layout, with two rooms in front and a large unfinished space in the rear. This unfinished space was converted into bedrooms and a bathroom at an unknown date before its ownership passed to Stephen Tyng Mather in 1906.

Mather made a number of alterations, giving the house a more Colonial Revival appearance. In 1927, based on designs by architect Thomas Harlan Ellett, he added a porch on the side and a two-story addition to the rear, and added the portico over the main entrance. The interior of the main block retained its original character through these changes, but the old kitchen space was converted into a living room. Mather also had a sunken garden built, along with a caretaker's cottage (replaced later by a guest house) and a carriage barn.

The house was declared a National Historic Landmark in 1963, and was listed on the National Register of Historic Places in 1966. The landmark includes three adjacent land parcels owned by Mather, plus a the family cemetery in which Mather is buried.

== Significance ==
Stephen Tyng Mather was born in California, educated at the University of California, and was a successful industrialist in the manufacture and processing of borax. He became interested in the condition of the nation's parks and public lands in 1904, expressing his concern in a letter to his friend Franklin Lane, the United States Secretary of the Interior. Lane responded by offering him a government post overseeing the parks, which Mather accepted in 1915. His lobbying of legislators and the press was instrumental in raising the profile of the park system, and resulted in the formal establishment of the National Park Service in 1916 with Mather as its director. Mather oversaw the establishment of the services policies and practices, as well as the addition of numerous parks into the system. He retired in 1929 and died the following year.

== See also ==
- List of National Historic Landmarks in Connecticut
- National Register of Historic Places listings in Fairfield County, Connecticut
