= Bronx General Post Office =

Historic post office in the Bronx, New York

- Bronx Central Annex-U.S. Post Office
- U.S. National Register of Historic Places
- New York State Register of Historic Places
- New York City Landmark
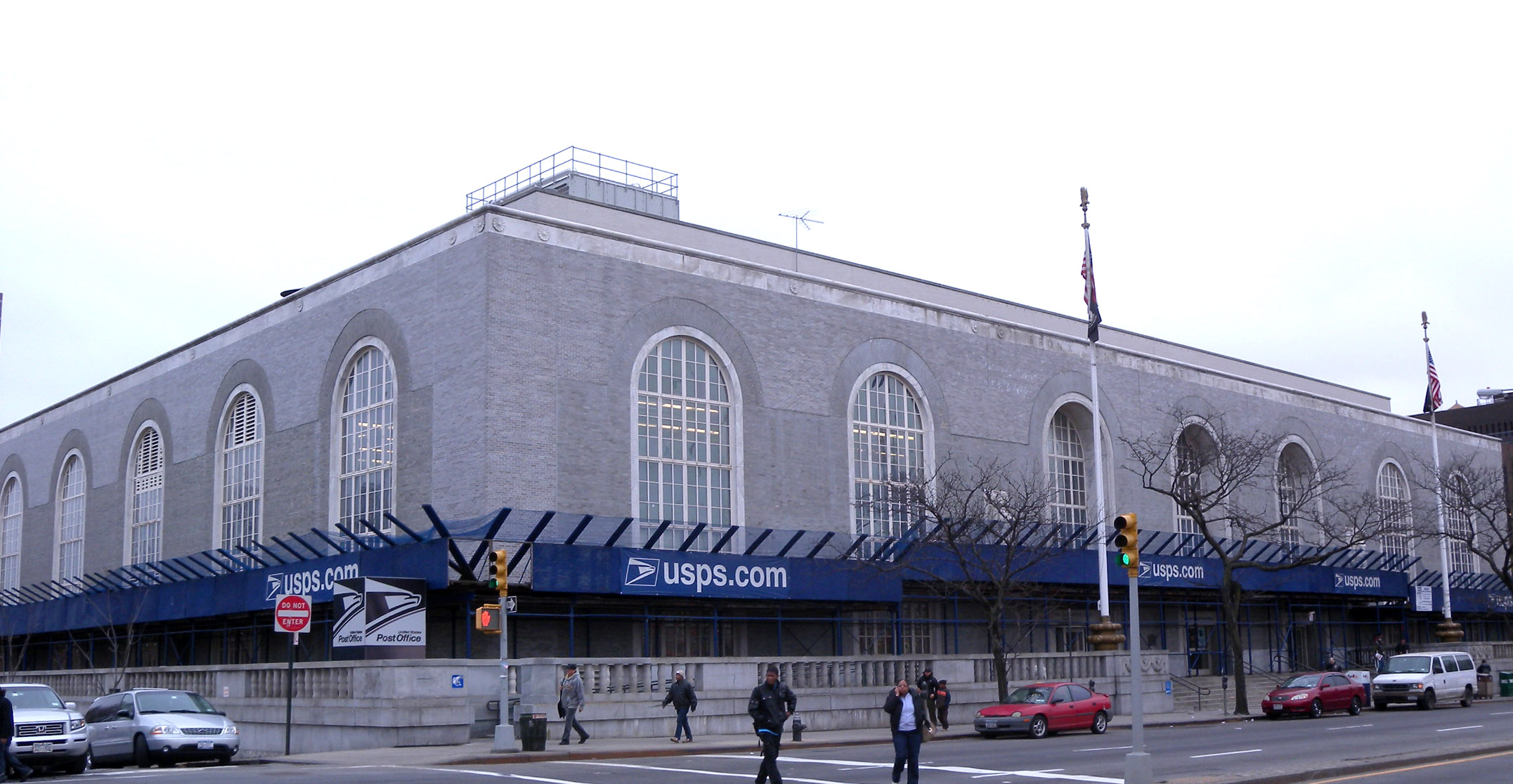
- Bronx Post Office, March 2010

- Location within New York City Location within New York Location within the United States
- Location: 558 Grand Concourse; Bronx, New York 10451
- Coordinates: 40°49′08″N 73°55′36″W
- Area: 1.5 acres (0.61 ha)
- Built: 1935
- Architect: Thomas Harlan Ellett; Ben Shahn and Bernarda Bryson (interior murals)
- NRHP reference No.: 80002584
- NYSRHP No.: 00501.000727
- NYCL No.: 0837, 2552

Significant dates
- Added to NRHP: May 6, 1980
- Designated NYSRHP: June 23, 1980
- Designated NYCL: November 25, 1975 (exterior); December 17, 2013 (interior)

The Bronx General Post Office (also known as the Bronx Central Post Office or Bronx Central Annex) is a historic post office building at 558 Grand Concourse in the South Bronx in New York City, New York, U.S. Designed by Thomas Harlan Ellett, the four-story structure was completed in 1937 for the United States Post Office Department and later served as a United States Postal Service (USPS) branch. The interior includes a series of 13 murals created by Ben Shahn and Bernarda Bryson for the U.S. Treasury Department's Section of Fine Arts. The building's facade and interior are New York City designated landmarks, and the structure is on the National Register of Historic Places.

The building is three stories high. It occupies an entire city block and is surrounded on all sides by a granite terrace. The facade of the basement is made of granite, while the rest of the facade is made of gray brick with marble arches. On the facade, flanking the main entrance on the Grand Concourse, are two sculptures: The Letter by Henry Kreis and Noah by Charles Rudy. The building has about 170,000 square feet (16,000 m^{2}) of interior space, spread across a basement and three above-ground stories. The murals are in the lobby, the only part of the building that is customarily accessible to the public, while the rest of the building included offices, equipment, and employee rooms.

Efforts to develop a central post office for the Bronx date to 1902, and the site was acquired between 1910 and 1913. There were various attempts to provide funding for the building in the 1910s and 1920s. U.S. Postmaster General James A. Farley and Treasury Secretary Henry Morgenthau Jr. announced plans for the building in 1934. A groundbreaking ceremony took place on June 13, 1936, and the building formally opened on May 15, 1937, as the Bronx Central Annex. Shahn and Bryson were hired in 1938 to paint the murals, which were finished the next year. The building became the Bronx General Post Office in 1963, when the sectional center facilities for Manhattan and the Bronx were split. The murals were renovated in the 1970s and 1990s. The USPS sold the building in 2014 to Youngwoo & Associates, which began redeveloping the building. Subsequently, Youngwoo tried to sell the structure in 2019 and again in 2024.

== Site ==
The Bronx General Post Office is located at 552–582 Grand Concourse in the South Bronx in New York City, New York, U.S. The site occupies an entire city block, with an area of about 53,800 square feet (5,000 m^{2}; 1.24 acres). It has a frontage of about 196 feet (60 m) on 149th Street to the south, 276 feet (84 m) on Anthony J. Griffin Place to the east, 191 feet (58 m) on 150th Street to the north, and 279 feet (85 m) on the Grand Concourse to the west. Anthony J. Griffin Place, a short street at the rear of the building, was originally known as Spencer Place, but it was renamed after the death of U.S. Representative Anthony J. Griffin in 1936. Hostos Community College and the entrances to the New York City Subway's 149th Street–Grand Concourse station are directly to the south, while Lincoln Hospital is to the southeast. Prior to the construction of the post office building, the site had been divided into 22 land lots.

== Architecture ==
The Bronx General Post Office was designed by consulting architect Thomas Harlan Ellett for the Office of the Supervising Architect. When the building opened, Architectural Forum wrote that "the building subtly suggests a Georgian precedent without the use of traditional detail", while The New York Times described the architectural style as a "modern style with modified classical ornament". Ellett regarded the building as being designed in a "contemporary Georgian" style. As built, the building is three stories high with a penthouse.

=== Facade ===
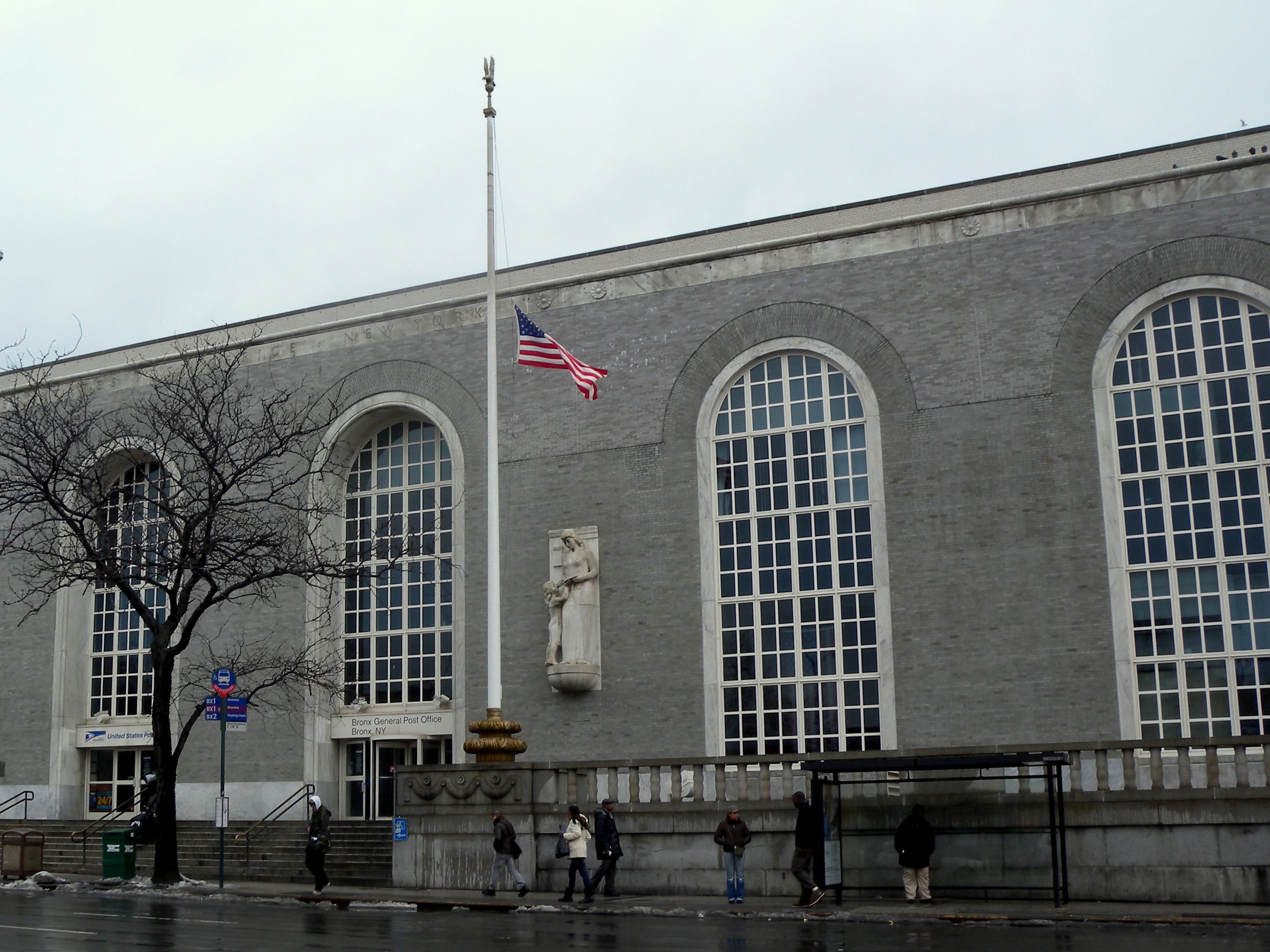
The flagpole south of the main entrance

The building is surrounded on all sides by a granite terrace, which has a classical-style balustrade. Because the site slopes down to the east, the basement is exposed on the building's eastern facade. To the west, a set of steps leads up to the main entrances on the Grand Concourse. The entrance steps are flanked by pedestals with swag and rosette motifs, which form the ends of the balustrade on either side. Atop the pedestals are bronze flagpole bases with foliate decorations.

The facade of the basement is made of granite. The rest of the facade is made of gray brick, with round-arched Vermont-marble frames around the windows and doors. Above the imposts of each arch are additional round arches made of brick, which encircle the marble frames of each window and door. There is a band course running across the facade above the Grand Concourse entrance, which bears the inscription "Bronx – United States Post Office – New York". The inscription is flanked by rosettes.

On the facade, flanking the Grand Concourse entrance, are two sculptures: The Letter by Henry Kreis and Noah by Charles Rudy. Both are carved out of white marble and measure 4 feet (1.2 m) wide by 14 feet (4.3 m) tall. Kreis's sculpture depicts someone giving a letter to a mother and child in their family. Rudy's sculpture depicts a dove giving a message to the biblical figure Noah after a great flood, an allusion to the USPS's unofficial motto "Neither snow nor rain nor heat nor gloom of night stays these couriers from the swift completion of their appointed rounds". Rudy was nominated for the Architectural League of New York's Henry O. Avery Prize for his work, receiving an honorable mention.

=== Interior ===
Sources disagree on the building's precise area, though it has about 170,000 square feet (16,000 m^{2}). (Note: Different sources cite the interior area as 169,000 square feet (15,700 m^{2}), 170,000 square feet (16,000 m^{2}), or 175,000 square feet (16,300 m^{2}). The New York City Department of City Planning cites the building as having a gross floor area of 175,316 square feet (16,287.4 m^{2}).) The floor slabs of the superstructure are composed of cinder concrete arches, while the floors themselves were covered in wood. The building's exterior walls are generally made of brick, with a plaster finish on the interior, while the interior walls are made of plaster with metal wainscoting. The workspaces generally have exposed ceilings, and the lobby, corridors, and certain special rooms have plaster ceilings. The restrooms have glass wainscoting.

Originally, the main floor had about 43,000 square feet (4,000 m^{2}) of usable space. On the first floor was the main lobby. The Internal Revenue Bureau also had a sub-office on the first floor, and mail carriers working the South Bronx worked on the same level. Mail collected from the South Bronx and Washington Heights, Manhattan, during afternoons and evenings were delivered to the first floor and then further distributed to recipients. The second floor had about 44,000 square feet (4,100 m^{2}) of usable space. The second floor handled mail that was headed to the South Bronx and Washington Heights, and it had sorting and distributing equipment. There were also work areas and lockers on the second floor. As built, the structure had a penthouse with 17,500 square feet (1,630 m^{2}) of storage rooms and offices. The basement had a garage with room for over 100 vehicles, and the sub-basement had a power plant and engine room. There was also a shooting range for security guards, which was located on the roof. Throughout the building were a series of hidden passageways and ladders.

==== Main lobby ====
The main lobby is the only part of the building that is customarily accessible to the public. As originally envisioned, the main lobby had postal windows. The main lobby is a double-height room designed in a modern classical style. The space is split into five bays. The center three bays are aligned with the three entrances from the Grand Concourse, on the lobby's western wall, while the northernmost and southernmost bays correspond to the windows on either side of the entrance.

The floor is made of patterned dark-gray terrazzo and light-gray marble. The walls are wainscoted in marble, and there are murals atop the wainscoting on each of the walls. The ceiling is supported by full-height marble columns in the Ionic order, and there are marble Ionic pilasters along the walls. The ceilings themselves are made of plaster and are divided into coffers, with four globe-shaped lamps hanging from the ceiling. On the west wall, the three center bays contain exit doors (which replaced the original glass vestibules), and the outer bays have windows. The south wall has two marble pilasters, which flank a bronze gate topped by a marble plaque. Two engaged columns separate the east wall into three portions; the northern section of the east wall has customer-service counters, while the central and southern sections have niches. Pilasters also divide the north wall into three sections, with a doorway in the western section and customer-service counters in the other two sections. Polished brass was used for hardware and furniture, and there were also painted metal screens. The original furniture has been removed and replaced with equipment such as kiosks.

The Bronx General Post Office is one of several 1930s post offices in New York City with murals that were painted through the Works Progress Administration program. The lobby has thirteen mural panels inspired by the words of Walt Whitman. The series has variously been called The Industrial and Agricultural Resources of America, America at Work, Resources of America, or just America. They were completed in 1939 by Ben Shahn and his partner (and later wife) Bernarda Bryson, who had been selected through an architectural design competition. The murals, made of egg tempera applied onto plaster, celebrate American industry and the products of labor. Twelve panels depict various workers in industry and agriculture. They are derived from photographs that Shahn took between 1935 and 1938, while he was employed by the Farm Security Administration. The largest panel, on the northern wall, depicts Whitman addressing American workers and their families; the panel includes depictions of farmhands, factory workers, and engineers. The Whitman panel originally contained a quote from one of Whitman's poems, which was swapped out after a Jesuit professor objected to it.

Some of the lobby murals

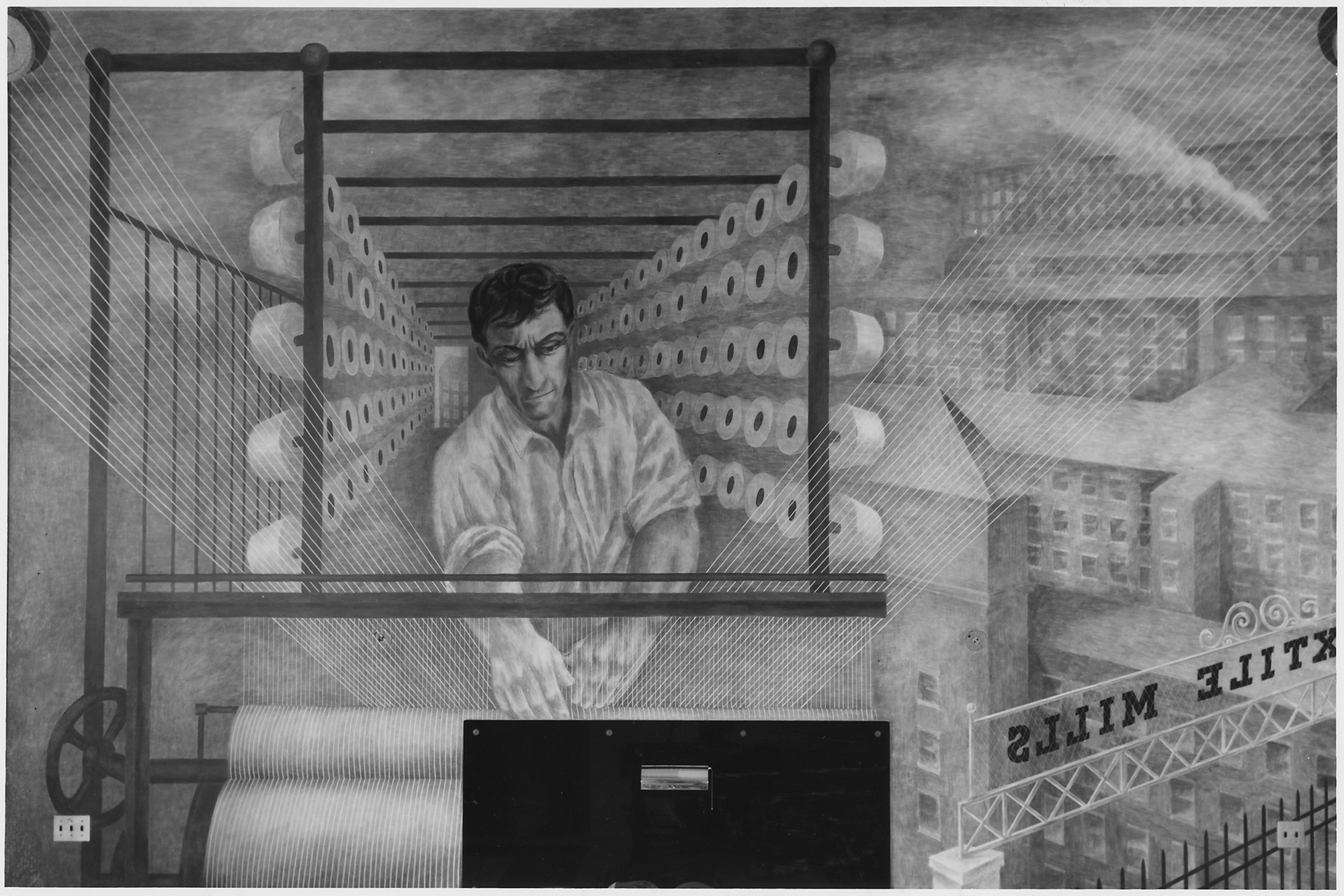
Celebrating the American textile industry

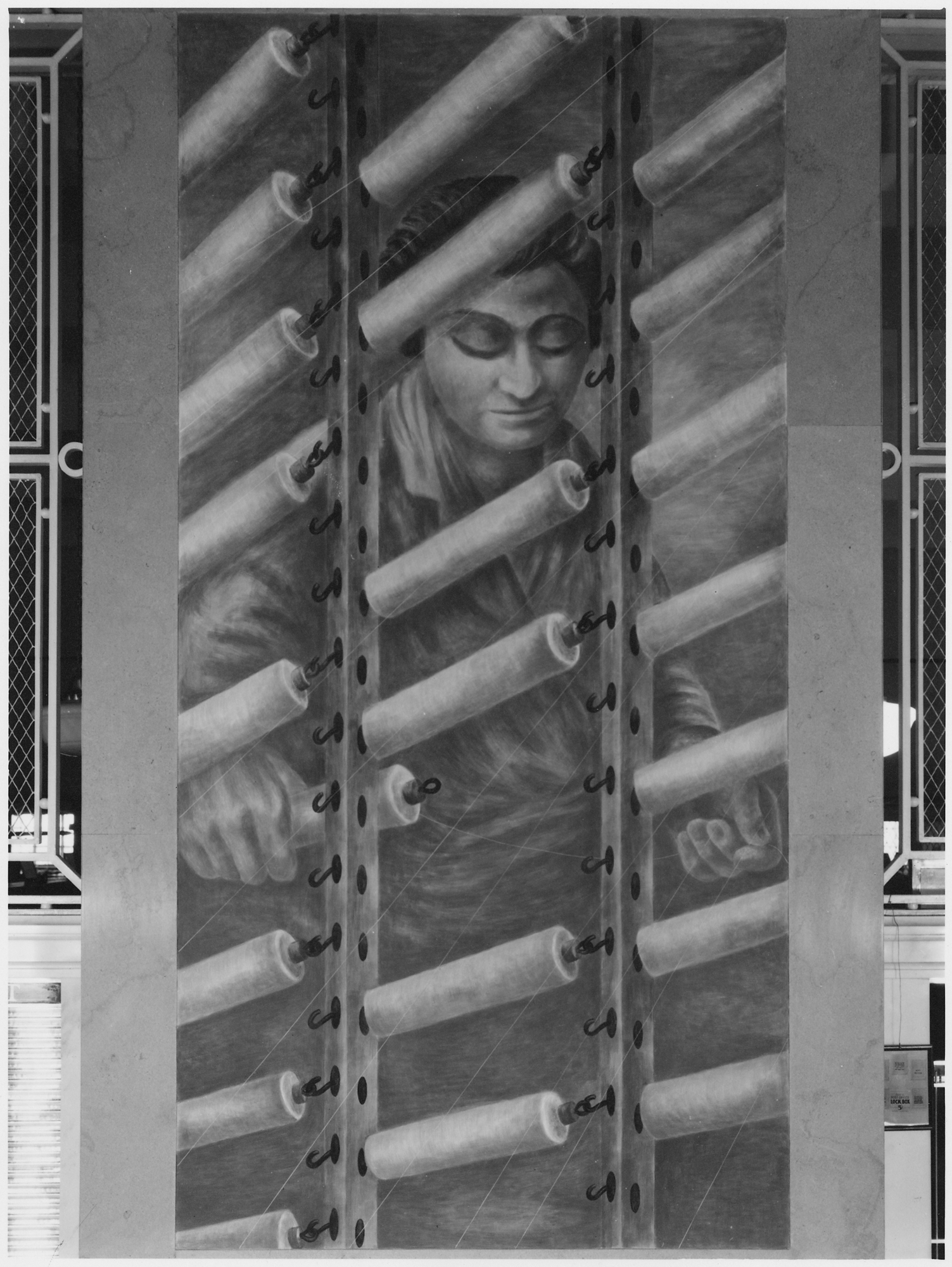
Woman working on a large loom

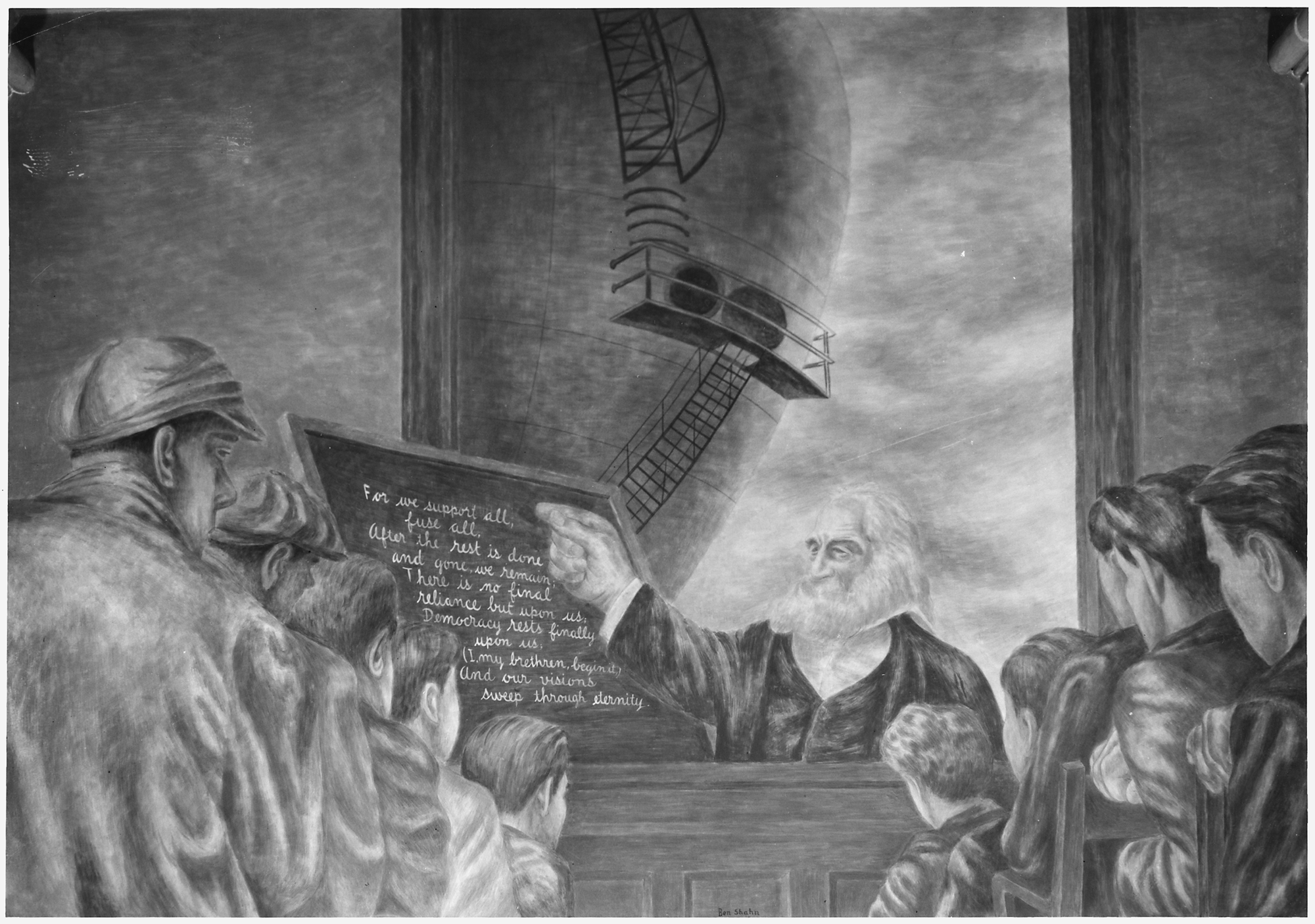
Walt Whitman addressing American workers and their families

== Development ==
The Bronx's population increased significantly in the early 20th century, as the development of the New York City Subway enabled residents to move out of overcrowded Manhattan neighborhoods such as the Lower East Side and East Harlem. By 1930, the Bronx had a million residents. The volume of mail sent to and from the Bronx was also increasing greatly; however, the borough did not have a central post office well into the 1930s. From 1907 to 1915 alone, the volume of mail in the Bronx nearly doubled, from 27 to 50 million pieces of mail annually.

=== Site acquisition ===
Government officials began clamoring for the development of a Bronx central post office in 1902, when Cornelius A. Pugsley introduced a bill in the United States House of Representatives, which proposed allocating $250,000 (Note: Equivalent to $7.3 million in 2024 (Note: Johnston, Louis; Williamson, Samuel H. (2023). "What Was the U.S. GDP Then?". MeasuringWorth. United States Gross Domestic Product deflator figures follow the MeasuringWorth series.)) for the construction of a post office in the Bronx. Pugsley's bill failed after the money was diverted to other appropriations. No further progress was made for eight years, though civic associations were also advocating for a Bronx central post office by 1907.

In January 1910, the United States Department of the Treasury acquired a 276-by-100-foot (84 by 30 m) site on Spencer Place (now Anthony J. Griffin Place), between 149th and 150th streets, from Henry L. Morris for $100,000. (Note: Equivalent to $2.4 million in 2024) The New York Times wrote that the construction of the post office building would help spur development along 149th Street, which was located near the Mott Avenue subway station and several businesses. The federal government subsequently moved to acquire the rest of the block, extending west to Mott Avenue (now the Grand Concourse), by eminent domain. Two commissioners were tasked with determining the value of the land. In 1912, the United States District Court for the Southern District of New York affirmed the commissioners' report, which valued the land at $180,000. (Note: Equivalent to $4.2 million in 2024) The United States Congress allocated a total of $285,000 (Note: Equivalent to $6.7 million in 2024) for a post office on the site. The final portion of the allocation was secured in September 1913, and the U.S. government bought 13 buildings at 554–582 Mott Avenue that November, thereby obtaining full ownership of the block. The U.S. government continued to rent out the buildings to tenants.

=== Funding attempts ===
There were several unsuccessful attempts to secure funding for the building in the 1910s and 1920s. A $750,000 congressional appropriation for a new post office was proposed in 1916 as part of a wider-ranging bill, which called for $35 million worth of improvements to federal buildings. (Note: The appropriation for the post office is equivalent to $14.9 million, and the total appropriation is equivalent to $694.9 million, in 2024.) A delegation of businessmen from the Bronx asked Congress to approve the appropriation. The U.S. House of Representatives approved an $850,000 (Note: Equivalent to $13.7 million in 2024) appropriation in January 1917, and U.S. Senator James W. Wadsworth Jr. introduced the appropriation bill in the Senate that February. Another such attempt occurred in 1919, when $1 million (Note: Equivalent to $13.5 million in 2024) for a central post office in the Bronx was proposed in the U.S. House's Public Buildings Appropriation Bill.

The Bronx Board of Trade advocated for a Bronx central post office in 1925, and U.S. Representative Benjamin L. Fairchild proposed allocating $1.5 million (Note: Equivalent to $21.3 million in 2024) for the purpose that December. The Board of Trade called on U.S. Postmaster General Harry New to begin constructing the post office building, an idea that New supported. The Real Estate Board of New York, which also endorsed the building's construction, asked senator Wadsworth for help in getting the edifice constructed. In 1929, the Board of Trade and the Bronx Chamber of Commerce again requested that a central post office be constructed at Mott Avenue and 149th Street. Later that year, the U.S. government finally committed to erecting a post office on the Mott Avenue site.

Postmaster General Walter F. Brown told the Bronx Board of Trade in 1930 that the United States Post Office Department was seriously considering the idea of a general mail-distribution facility at Mott Avenue and 149th Street, similar to the General Post Office in Manhattan. After the Board of Trade invited Post Office Department officials to tour the Mott Avenue site in March 1931, assistant postmaster general John W. Philp said that he would recommend that Congress provide money for the post office building. Subsequently, a $1.42 million (Note: Equivalent to $26.5 million in 2024) appropriation for the building was included in a bill presented to Congress in early 1932. However, Philp stated that July that the federal government could not immediately provide funding for the building. Subsequently, the Chamber of Commerce wrote directly to President Herbert Hoover, objecting to the lack of funding. There were also disputes over where exactly the Bronx general post office should be located, but the Bronx Board of Trade refused to consider any site other than the Mott Avenue plot.

=== Construction ===
Postmaster General James A. Farley said in February 1934 that the Post Office Department was considering a "concentration and distribution" building at the Grand Concourse and 149th Street. That June, Farley and U.S. Treasury Secretary Henry Morgenthau Jr. announced that a post office would be built on the site. The federal government provided an appropriation for the building the same month, which was variously cited as $1.575 million or $1.750 million. (Note: Equivalent to between $28.8 million and $32 million in 2024) This funding was made available through the Public Works Administration (PWA) program, which also included the development of 28 other buildings in New York City and several thousand more such projects nationwide. That August, the Treasury Department notified the Bronx Board of Trade that it was conducting a study of the Grand Concourse site. Before work on the building itself began, the Department of the Treasury informed the city government that the surrounding area had to be graded and that some utilities had to be relocated. The city had to pay for the grading work, since it was ineligible for federal funding.

Louis A. Simon—the Supervising Architect for the U.S. Treasury—and his staff were responsible for the design of many PWA projects. However, the large number of new PWA buildings prompted Simon to hire 21 architects and 300 draftsmen on a temporary basis; among these architects was Thomas Harlan Ellett, who was tasked with designing the Bronx General Post Office. Ellett finished his plans for the building in December 1934, and these plans were submitted to the New York City Department of Buildings early the next year. The plans called for a two-story building with a basement. The post office was to have a garage in the rear and employee rooms on the second story, and it would be sturdy enough to support the future construction of additional floors. By June 1935, the city government had not allocated any money for grading the site. A U.S. Treasury official warned that, if the city could not re-grade Spencer Place, the building would have to be redesigned to eliminate a proposed driveway that led from Spencer Place. There were also delays in excavating the site.

The Cauldwell-Wingate Company received a $1.032 million (Note: Equivalent to $18.5 million in 2024) construction contract for the building in September 1935. Philip C. Smith Jr. was hired as the construction engineer. At the time, the building was expected to be completed by October 1936. A groundbreaking ceremony for the building took place on June 13, 1936; to mark the occasion, Bronx borough president James J. Lyons decreed that day a borough holiday. The same month, Charles Rudy and Henry Kreis were each hired to create a sculpture for the building's facade. Rudy and Kreis, who received $7,500 each for their work, (Note: Equivalent to $176,982 in 2025 (Note: 1634–1699: McCusker, J. J. (1997). How Much Is That in Real Money? A Historical Price Index for Use as a Deflator of Money Values in the Economy of the United States: Addenda et Corrigenda (PDF). American Antiquarian Society. 1700–1799: McCusker, J. J. (1992). How Much Is That in Real Money? A Historical Price Index for Use as a Deflator of Money Values in the Economy of the United States (PDF). American Antiquarian Society. 1800–present: Federal Reserve Bank of Minneapolis. "Consumer Price Index (estimate) 1800–".)) had beat out nearly 400 other sculptors who had submitted designs to the Treasury Department. Both men were hired through the Treasury's Section of Painting and Sculpture. The project employed 180 workers. Construction was halted temporarily in September 1936 after stonecutters on the site went on strike, alleging that non-union laborers had been employed to cut the Vermont marble; at the time, the building had been erected to the first floor. The strike was settled after a week. The building was completed by April 1937, having cost either $1.03 million or $1.25 million to erect. (Note: Equivalent to between $17.6 million and $21.4 million in 2024)

== Post office use ==
=== 1930s and 1940s ===
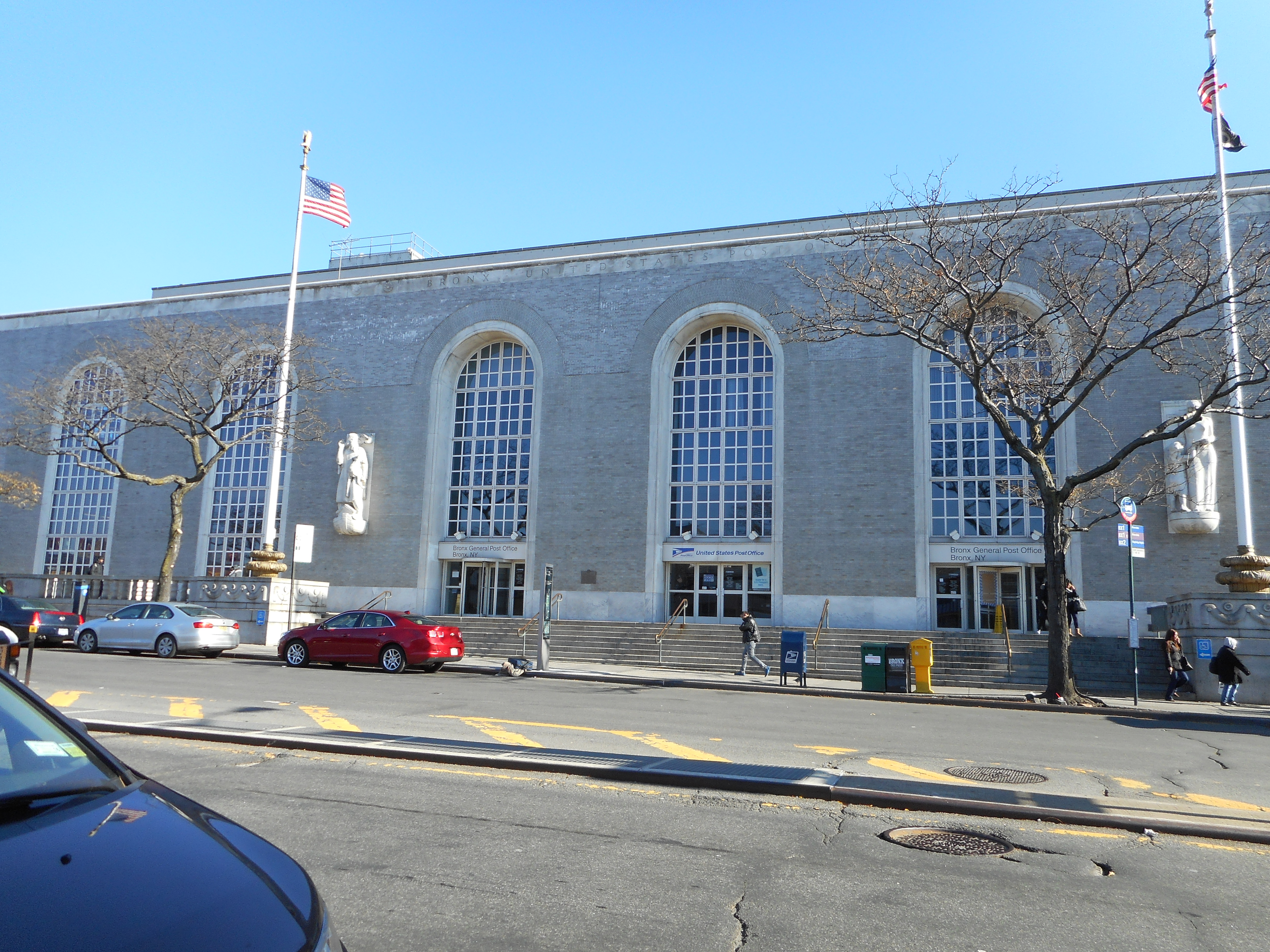
Main entrance on Grand Concourse

The building opened on May 15, 1937, when postmaster general Farley dedicated the building in front of 3,000 people. At the time, the building was expected to handle 500,000 pieces of mail every day. The structure also contained space for the Internal Revenue Bureau, the U.S. Customs Service, and the Treasury. Because it supplemented the Central Post Office in Manhattan, the new post office was officially known as the Bronx Central Annex. The post office's first superintendent was William H. Farrell Jr., a Bronx resident who had worked for the Post Office Department since 1891; he worked there until 1943. Several longtime Post Office Department employees from the Bronx were also hired as the post office building's assistant superintendents, assistant cashier, and foremen. Simultaneously with the completion of the Bronx Central Annex, local businesspeople and Bronx borough president James J. Lyons asked the New York Central Railroad, whose tracks ran next to the building, to construct a commuter rail station there. The railroad had promised to build the station for several decades, but it was never constructed.

Shortly after the Bronx Central Annex's completion, the Treasury asked artists to submit designs for 13 murals that were being planned for the building's lobby; the winner was to receive $7,000. (Note: Equivalent to $129,990 million in 2025) The Treasury appointed Ellett and Henry Varnum Poor to review the designs. Ellett and Poor received 198 designs from artists in the northeastern United States. That May, Ellett and Poor selected the artists Ben Shahn and Bernarda Bryson to design the murals. Seventeen runners-up were invited to design murals for other post offices around the country; for example, after Amy Jones submitted a proposal for the Bronx Post Office, she was invited to design a mural for the Painted Post, New York, post office. Shahn and Bryson hung mockups of the murals in the Bronx Central Annex's lobby in December 1938. The same month, Ignatius W. Cox, a priest on the faculty at Fordham University in the Bronx, objected to the inclusion of a quotation by Walt Whitman, which Cox claimed was an endorsement of religious skepticism. As such, work on the panels was temporarily halted in December 1938, and the Whitman quotation was swapped out with another quote. In addition, a reference to the Deering company had to be removed from another panel owing to concerns over commercial promotion. The murals were finished in August 1939.

The building remained in use as a post office for the rest of the 20th century. In its early years, the building hosted events such as Christmas tree lighting parties and traveling stamp displays. In 1943, the Bronx Central Annex was designated as the post office for New York postal district 51. The postal district, a predecessor to the modern ZIP Code, was bounded by the Harlem River to the southwest, Jerome Avenue and 161st Street to the north, and Third Avenue and Courtland Avenue to the east. An automatic mail-sorting machine known as the Mailomat was installed at the Bronx Central Annex in 1947, allowing patrons to send mail when the building was closed. An automatic stamp vending machine was added to the building the next year.

=== 1950s to 1970s ===
The Post Office Department installed a curbside mailbox outside the building in 1951, allowing patrons to send mail from their cars; it was one of the first such mailboxes installed in New York City. The following year, the Bronx Central Annex was designated as the distribution hub for mail to and from the Highbridge, the Hub, Mott Haven, Morrisania, Melrose, and Morris Heights neighborhoods in the southwestern Bronx. Previously, mail to and from these neighborhoods had been handled at other post offices. In addition, to encourage patrons and mail carriers to have themselves tested for tuberculosis, the New York City Department of Health temporarily installed an X-ray machine in the building's lobby in 1955.

By the early 1960s, about 427 million pieces of mail were being sent to the Bronx annually, and about 189 million pieces of mail were being sent from the borough every year. However, the Bronx still shared a sectional center facility (SCF) with Manhattan, which caused mail deliveries in both boroughs to be delayed; by contrast, the boroughs of Brooklyn and Staten Island each had their own SCFs, and the borough of Queens had four SCFs. As such, the Post Office Department agreed to establish a separate SCF for the Bronx in 1962, and the Central Annex became the Bronx General Post Office when the SCF was created the following January. Letters to and from the Bronx, which formerly went to Manhattan's General Post Office first, were instead processed directly at the Bronx General Post Office. To mark the upcoming implementation of ZIP Codes, a wooden mascot called Mr. Zip was dedicated at the Bronx General Post Office that May.

The United States Congress received plans in July 1963 for $2.3 million (Note: Equivalent to $18 million in 2024) in modifications to the Bronx General Post Office, which was to be renovated after other federal agencies had moved out of the building. The U.S. House approved the modifications at the end of the month, as did the U.S. Senate that August. In 1967, the General Services Administration (GSA) announced plans for a new central post office at Fordham Road and Third Avenue. The new building was to take over the functions of the existing post office building on the Grand Concourse, as well as a garage on Gerard Avenue. By then, the existing building had been deemed obsolete, and its murals were also in very poor condition. An information center for federal government jobs opened at the Bronx General Post Office in 1968. President Richard Nixon ultimately canceled funding for the new building on Fordham Road.

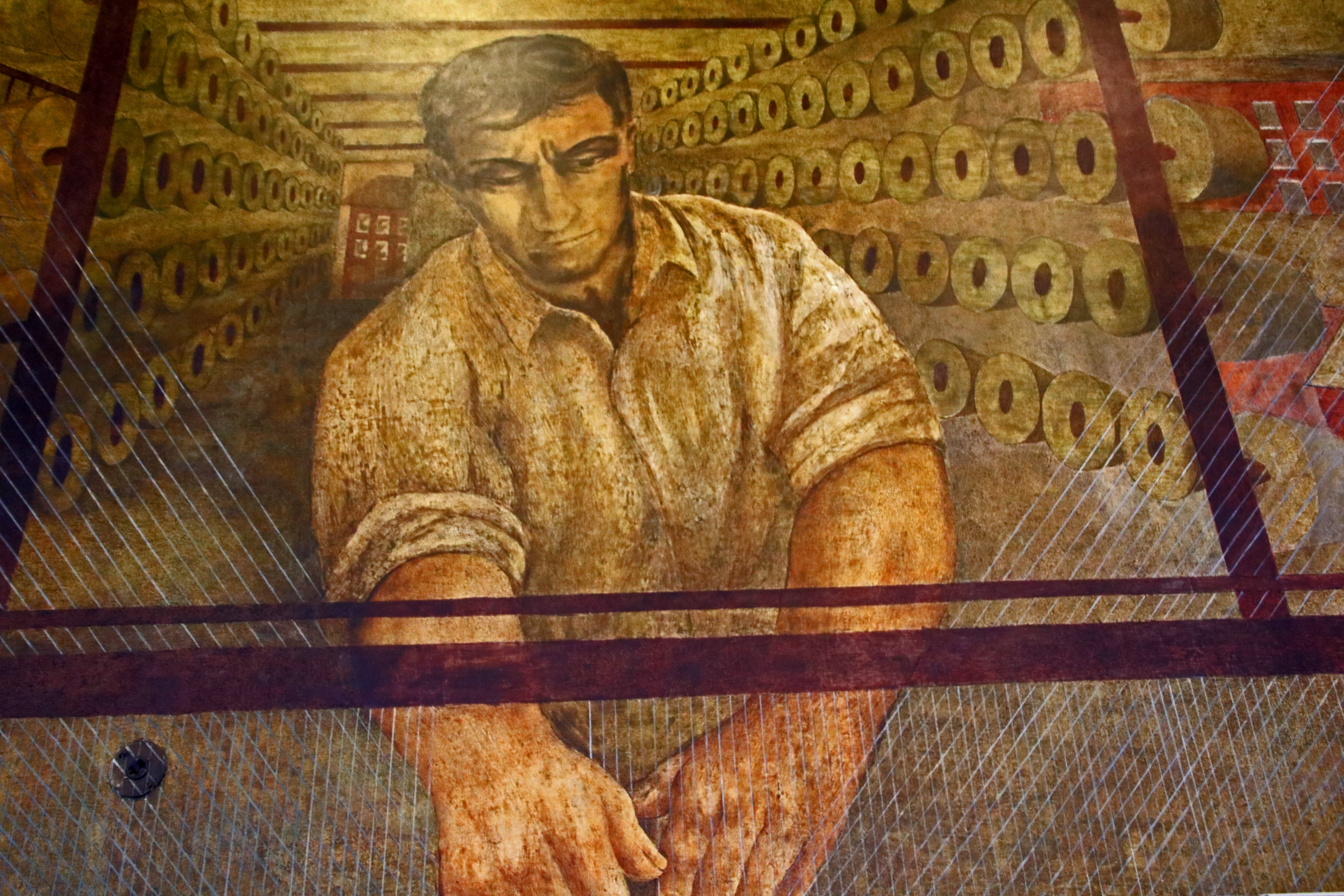
The lobby murals were restored in 1970–1971 and again in 1975–1977.

By 1970, the Post Office Department sought to rent 2,300 square feet (210 m^{2}) of office space nearby because of a lack of space in the existing structure. The same year, Hiram H. Hoelzer began restoring the interior murals the same year on behalf of the GSA. This project cost $9,000 (Note: Equivalent to $74,614 in 2025) and was completed in 1971. Bulletin boards and telephones were installed afterward, overlapping parts of the murals. The New York City Landmarks Preservation Commission (LPC) began considering designating the General Post Office as a city landmark in 1975. However, two other city agencies asked the LPC to defer the designation, as the Post Office Department's successor, the United States Postal Service (USPS), was considering expanding the building. The LPC ultimately designated the building's exterior as a city landmark in September 1976. (Note: A Staten Island Advance article from November 1975 reported on the designation, but the LPC's own designation report dates from September 1976.) A two-year-long renovation of the lobby began in 1975, which included modifications to the lobby's east wall and the removal of decorations such as grilles, desks, and screens. The murals were restored, and the telephone booths and bulletin boards on the murals were removed.

=== 1980s to early 2010s ===
The Bronx General Post Office was added to the National Register of Historic Places in 1980. Additional modifications were made to the lobby in the late 20th and early 21st centuries, including the addition of more furniture and the replacement of doors. The New York Daily News wrote in 1984 that "the building has not received the attention it deserves" and that customers and passersby alike largely ignored its architecture. The building's manager, Anthony Kienle, conversely said that graduate students visited the post office to write dissertations about the murals. By then, the Bronx General Post Office processed not only mail from the Bronx, but also mail deposited in mailboxes and post offices in Upper Manhattan north of 80th Street. By 1989, there were plans to move the USPS's borough headquarters to a larger facility on the Hutchinson River Parkway. The relocation was delayed in the early 1990s after the USPS sought to eliminate unnecessary expenses nationwide.

By the mid-1990s, the Bronx General Post Office was near capacity; the USPS was unable to install new sorting equipment because of a lack of space, and the agency also could not easily expand the building because it was a protected landmark. The landmark designations even prevented the USPS from installing bulletproof plastic shields at the customer-service counters, a feature that had been installed at every other post office in the Bronx. To alleviate congestion at the Bronx General Post Office, the USPS began sorting some Bronx mail in Manhattan, Queens, and Westchester County in 1993. However, this move caused Bronx mail to be delayed, sometimes by several weeks, so the USPS promised in 1994 to upgrade the Bronx General Post Office's sorting equipment instead. By then, New York Times reporter Grace Glueck wrote that the building's murals had again become dilapidated. Upon reading a Times article about the murals, American Postal Workers Union president Moe Biller hired the conservator Alan Farancz to restore the murals. Farancz and an assistant completed their restoration in 1996.

In the 2000s, a professor at the City University of New York's Lehman College created a website documenting the building's murals. Postal workers and local community groups established the Bronx Coalition to Save Our Post Offices in late 2005, amid reports that the USPS was considering moving the Bronx General Post Office's processing facilities to Manhattan. At the time, the USPS was conducting a feasibility study on whether to consolidate mail-processing facilities, though it denied that such a change would delay mail deliveries in the Bronx. After U.S. Representative José E. Serrano raised concerns, the USPS Inspector General's office agreed to reconsider plans to relocate the building's mail-processing facility. Ultimately, the USPS Inspector General recommended in late 2007 that the processing and distributing functions be moved to the Morgan General Mail Facility in Manhattan. The processing and distributing facilities were ultimately relocated in 2011, though the building continued to be used as a neighborhood post office.

== Redevelopment ==
=== Sale ===
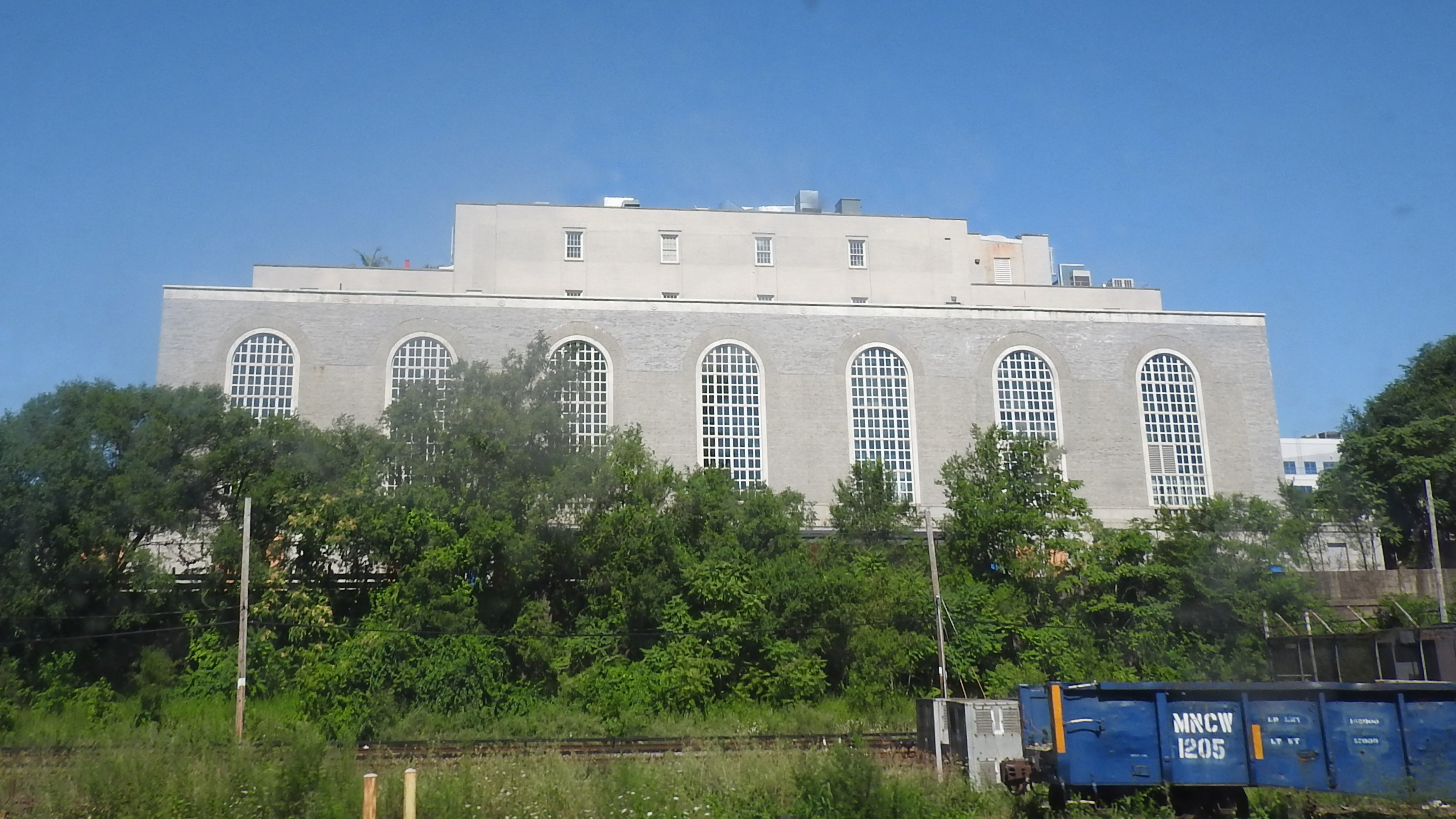
The building seen from the east

In a letter dated December 31, 2012, the USPS announced that it was considering selling the Bronx General Post Office. Most of the operations had already been relocated from the building, and the USPS estimated that it needed only 7,300 square feet (680 m^{2}) for a post office in the neighborhood. At the time, the USPS was selling some 200 buildings in light of declining mail volume and the growth of online services. Only 20 to 25 percent of the building's interior was in use, and its staff had been reduced to 30 or 40 people. Since the building occupied a large site at the intersection of two major streets, it was a prime site for redevelopment. The USPS estimated that the building was worth $14 million. The USPS began hosting public meetings about the proposed sale in February 2013, but few residents attended these hearings, reportedly because they were poorly publicized.

Residents and politicians organized in opposition to the proposed sale. Nearly every elected official representing the Bronx asked the USPS not to sell the building. Serrano claimed that the sale disregarded many Bronx residents' desires for the building to not be sold. Borough president Rubén Díaz Jr. expressed concerns that the General Post Office might be turned into self-storage space. Though Díaz's office supported the sale, Díaz himself wanted to wait for the "right kind of business" to buy the structure and contribute to the South Bronx's economy. Following a month-long public meeting process, the USPS decided in March 2013 to sell the building, prompting further objections. That June, the USPS determined that the objections to the sale were insufficient to prevent it from moving forward. Opponents appealed the decision, saying it was rushed, though the USPS moved to have the appeals dismissed. Opponents also protested outside the building and filed a lawsuit to halt the sale. Serrano proposed a clause in the congressional spending bill, which would prevent historic post office buildings from being sold until they were reviewed. Though the clause was included in the final bill, Serrano expressed doubt that the USPS would follow through with such a review.

At the time the sale was announced, only the building's exterior was formally protected as a city landmark, leaving the building's interior vulnerable to modifications, though the USPS was considering enforcing a covenant that forced potential buyers to preserve the murals. Community members and preservationists sought city-landmark designation for the interior as well; the supporters of the designation included Shahn's son Jonathan, in addition to Serrano. The LPC eventually agreed to host a public hearing on designating the interiors, and the agency granted the building's interior landmark status on December 17, 2013. The USPS received initial bids for the property the next month. Local elected officials favored the proposal submitted by one bidder, Youngwoo & Associates, who had suggested turning the building into a marketplace or shopping center. Youngwoo purchased the building in September 2014 for $19 million.

=== Renovation and further sale attempts ===
Youngwoo submitted plans for the building to the New York City Department of Buildings in December 2014. Under Youngwoo's plan, the building would retain a small post office. Because the building was a city landmark, the LPC had to approve any changes made to the building, so Youngwoo presented its plans to the LPC in January 2015. The next month, the LPC approved the redevelopment, which included retail space and postal services on the two lower floors, office space on the two upper floors, and a rooftop restaurant. The plan included restoration of the exterior and lobby, particularly the murals.

Youngwoo & Associates and its development partner Bristol Group hired Hollister Construction Services to renovate the Bronx General Post Office. In addition, Studio V Architecture was hired as the architect. During the renovation, workers removed many pieces of postal equipment and interior finishes. Once the renovation was completed, Youngwoo planned to rebrand the building as Bronx Post Place. The redevelopment project encountered difficulties; the reopening date was postponed to 2017, then to 2018. According to the urban planner Sam Goodman, the area's low median household income and the presence of the Bronx Terminal Market mall nearby meant that there was not much demand for the redevelopment to begin with.

By 2018, Youngwoo was looking to sell the building. MHP Real Estate Services and Banyan Street Capital tentatively agreed to purchase the General Post Office Building in January 2019 for more than $70 million, but the sale was canceled that July. A rooftop restaurant called Zona de Cuba opened atop the building that year, and there were also plans to lease space in the building to educational or retail tenants. In May 2024, the building was placed for sale again for about $70 million. By then, Zona de Cuba was the building's largest tenant with about 15,000 square feet (1,400 m^{2}) of space, while the USPS had only 10,000 square feet (930 m^{2}) of space. The murals, while hidden from public view, were still in good condition, since the building could not be sold unless the murals had been restored. In July 2025, Youngwoo & Associates sold the building to a residential developer, Maddd Equities, for $44 million. The City University of New York (CUNY) signed a 35-year lease for part of the building that September, intending to use it as a life-science facility for Hostos Community College, and paid $201 million for the building the next year.

== Reception ==
Both the Bronx General Post Office and its murals have been the subject of commentary over the years. When the structure was completed, Architectural Forum wrote that the building had successfully combined "a distinct modern influence and the continuing tradition of 'government classic'". In 1968, a writer from Artforum said that Shahn and Bryson had managed to create "outstanding murals" in the building, despite the Section of Painting and Sculpture's exacting requirements, but regarded the Whitman mural on the north wall as "the weakest of the panels compositionally". The New York Times wrote in 1995 that Shahn and Bryson's murals were "possibly the greatest publicly displayed art in the Bronx", having managed to survive at a time when the Bronx, government-funded artwork, and 1930s–era social realism had all fallen out of favor. Tablet magazine described the murals in 2013 as "a prominent example of federal support for the arts" in the 1930s.

== See also ==
- List of New York City Designated Landmarks in the Bronx
- National Register of Historic Places listings in the Bronx
