= Cosmopolitan Club (New York City) =

Social club in New York City

Coordinates: 40.7667°N 73.9656°W

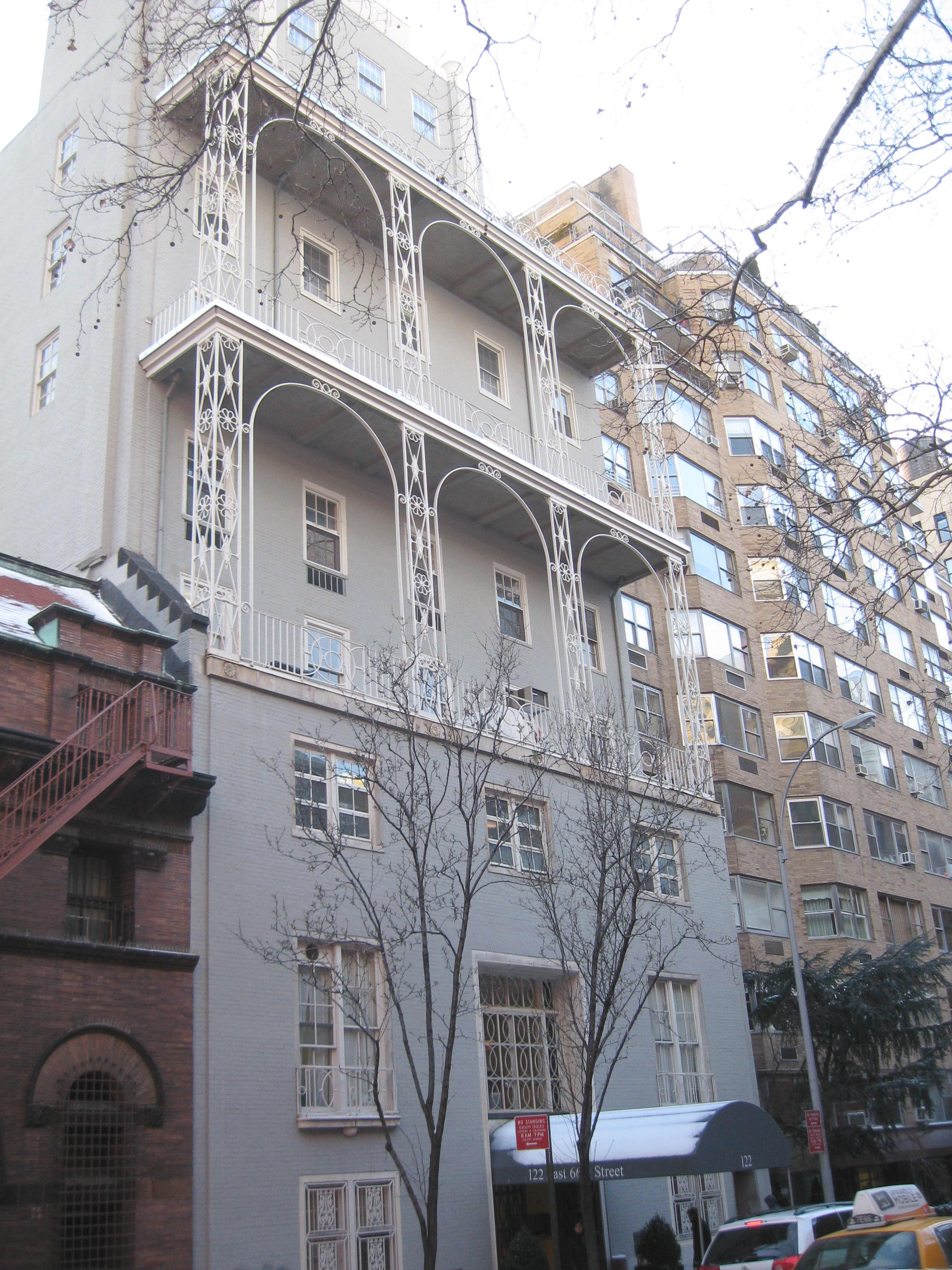
- The Cosmopolitan Club at 122 East 66th, New York City
- Abbreviation: Cos Club
- Formation: 1909; 117 years ago
- Founder: Helen Gilman Brown (President), Abby Aldrich Rockefeller, Edith Carpenter Macy, Adele Herter, Mrs. John Sherman Hoyt, Mrs. E. R. Hewitt, Mrs. Ellwood Hendrick
- Type: Nonprofit
- Purpose: "Where women of accomplishment enjoy each other's company and pursue their interest in arts and letters, and current events.."
- Headquarters: 122 East 66th Street; New York, NY
- Region served: New York metropolitan area (United States)
- Website: CosClub.com

The Cosmopolitan Club is a private members' club on the Upper East Side of Manhattan in New York City, New York, United States. Located at 122 East 66th Street, east of Park Avenue, it has been since its founding a women's club. Members have included Willa Cather, Ellen Glasgow, Eleanor Roosevelt, Jean Stafford, Helen Hayes, Pearl Buck, Marian Anderson, Margaret Mead, Margaret Barker, and Abby Aldrich Rockefeller.

The Cosmopolitan Club has EIN 13-0603250 under 501(c)(7) Social and Recreation Clubs; in 2024 it claimed total revenue of $11,434,225 and total assets of $28,352,899.

== History ==
In 1909, the Cosmos Club formed as a club for governesses, leasing space in the Gibson Building on East 33rd Street. The following year, the club became the Women's Cosmopolitan Club, "organized," according to The New York Times, "for the benefit of New York women interested in the arts, sciences, education, literature, and philanthropy or in sympathy with those interested." The club incorporated on March 22, 1911, with Helen Gilman Brown as its president. The other founding members were Abby Aldrich Rockefeller, Edith Carpenter Macy (Mrs. V. Everit Macy), Adele Herter (Mrs. Albert Herter), Mrs. E. R. Hewitt, Mrs. John Sherman Hoyt, and Mrs. Ellwood Hendrick. Dues were $20 a year.

Early notable members included novelists Willa Cather and Ellen Glasgow, violinist Kathleen Parlow, sculptor Anna Hyatt, dancer Adeline Genée, philanthropist Grace Dodge, and Elizabeth Clift Bacon Custer, the widow of General George Armstrong Custer,, as well as suffragists. In 1913, club members put on "An Evening in a Persian Garden," with snake dancers and readings of Persian verse. The success of the fête led to an increase in membership, and in 1914 the club moved to larger quarters at 44th Street and Lexington Avenue, shortening its name to the Cosmopolitan Club.

In December 1917, the club held an exhibition of paintings by Pablo Picasso. Guest speakers in that era included poets Amy Lowell, Vachel Lindsay, and Siegfried Sassoon, educator Maria Montessori, and First Lady Lou Henry Hoover.

In 1932, the club moved to its current home, a ten-story brick building with white marble trim and wrought-iron balconies, situated at 122 East 66th Street, across the street from the Seventh Regiment Armory. The architect Thomas Harlan Ellett designed the new clubhouse, for which the Architectural League gave him its 1933 gold medal, calling his design "a fresh and personal interpretation, beautiful in its simplicity of form and material." In the years following its construction, the club invited numerous musicians to perform, such as Sergei Prokofiev, Nadia Boulanger, Count Basie and Lotte Lenya, and invited numerous luminaries to speak, such as poet Robert Frost and journalists Dorothy Thompson and Edward R. Murrow.

== Membership ==
By 1917, the club had 600 members, with another 400 on its waiting list.

According to its current (2018) website, "for over a century" the club has been "a gathering place where women of accomplishment enjoy each other's company and pursue their interest in arts and letters, and current events." The club has a dress code; among other strictures, the wearing of blue jeans and running shoes is prohibited.

== Historical gallery ==
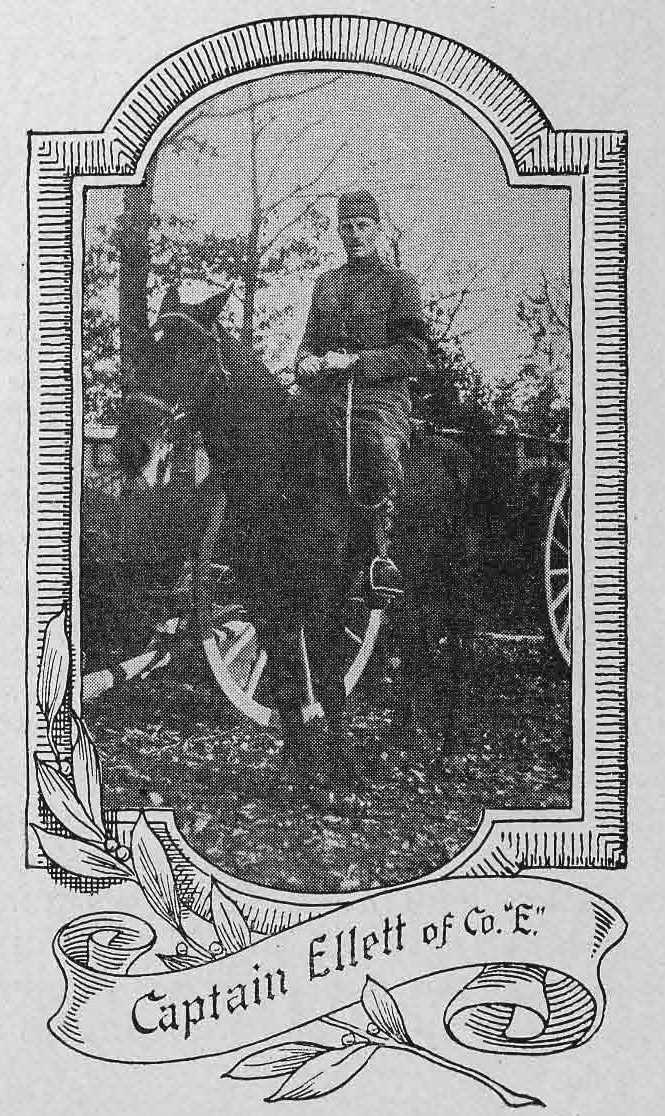
Thomas Harlan Ellett, architect of the Cosmopolitan Club, in France during the First World War.

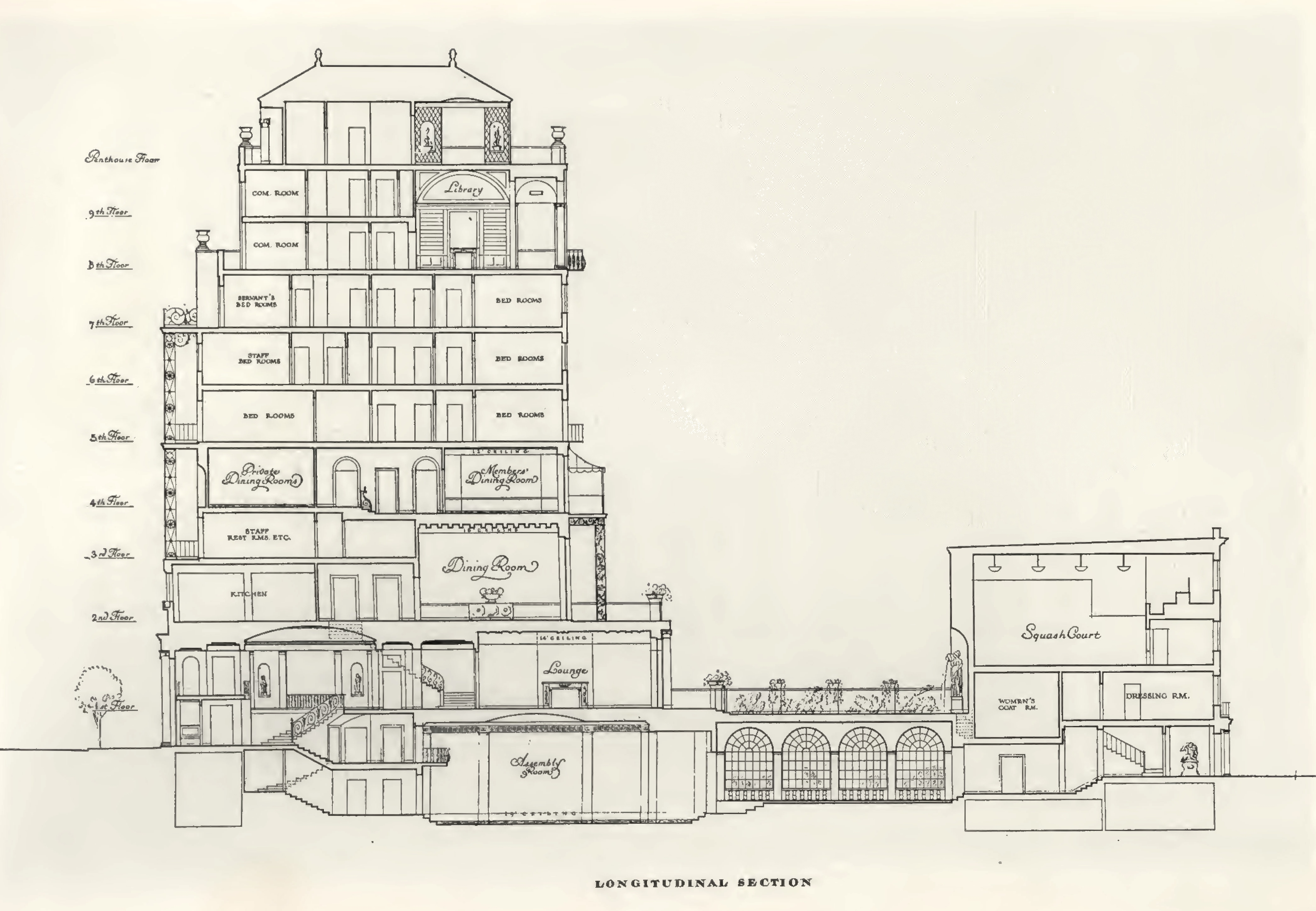
An architectural drawing of the Cosmopolitan Club, New York City, built 1932.

Floor plans of the Cosmopolitan Club, New York City, drawn by T.H. Ellett, architect.

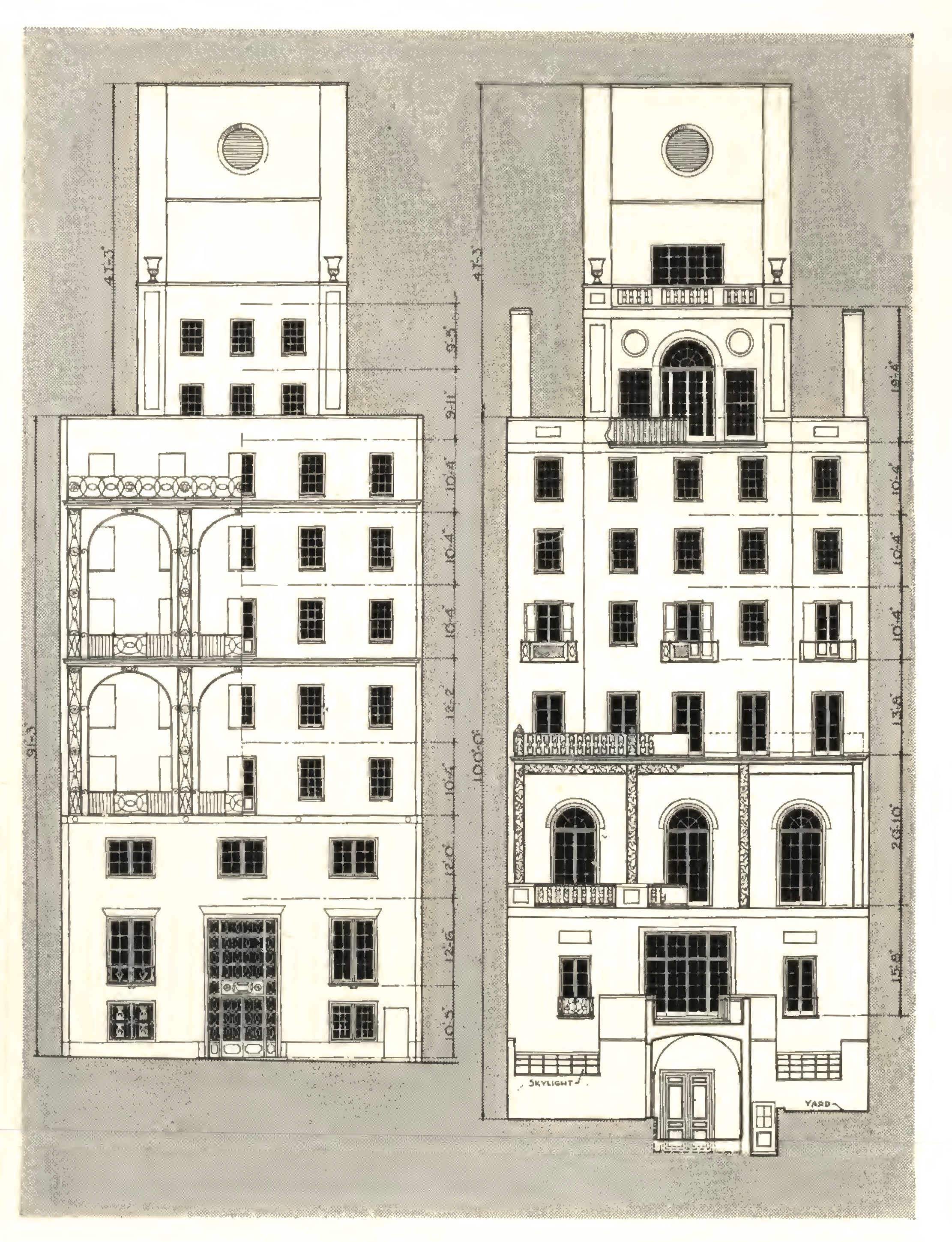
The architect T.H. Ellett's design for the Cosmopolitan Club street facade (left) and garden facade (right).

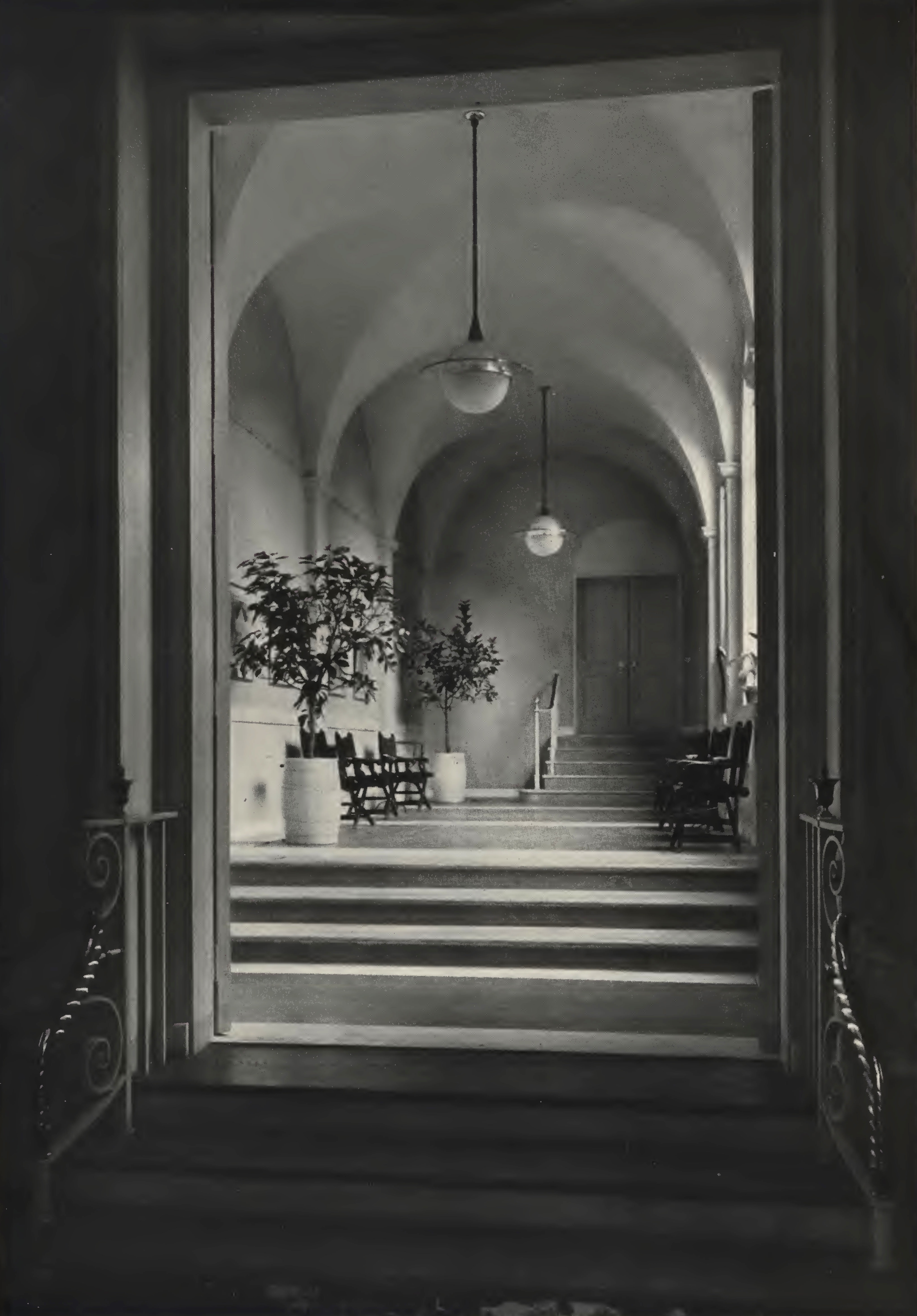
A 1933 view of the Gallery connecting the 65th and 66th Street wings.

== See also ==
- Thomas Harlan Ellett
- List of American gentlemen's clubs
