= Thomas Harlan Ellett =

American architect (1890–1951)

- Born: September 2, 1880; Red Oak, Iowa
- Died: November 24, 1951 (aged 71); Garrison, New York
- Education: Armour Institute of Technology; University of Pennsylvania; Pennsylvania Academy of the Fine Arts
- Occupation: Architect
- Spouse: Jane Poultney Bigelow
- Buildings: Cosmopolitan Club; Bronx Post Office

Thomas Harlan Ellett (September 2, 1880 – November 24, 1951) was an American architect who practiced in New York City.

== Early life and education ==
Harlan Ellett, as he was known in his youth, was born in 1880 and grew up in Sherman Township, Iowa, the son of Thomas Ely Ellett, a farmer, and his wife, Caroline Elizabeth Bake. According to one historian, the Ellett farm was in Sherman, Section 18, P.O. Red Oak, Iowa, "... a splendid farm of 250 acres, all in cultivation; good house, and a fine orchard of six acres." The father died in 1895, by which time the family had moved into town, to a house in Red Oak's third ward.

In the fall of 1899, Ellett traveled to Chicago where his uncle Edwin H. Ellett was a cattle broker. Ellett enrolled in the Armour Institute of Technology, became a member of the swim team, captain of the water polo team, and in 1902, a recipient of a Certificate in Architecture. (A cousin, Edwin H. Ellett Jr., was a graduate of the class of 1907).

Ellett then enrolled at the University of Pennsylvania where he studied with the architect Paul Cret. He was valedictorian of the class of 1906, won the Arthur Spayd Brooke Memorial Prize (gold medal) and got a Bachelor of Science in Architecture. The following year, he studied at the Pennsylvania Academy of the Fine Arts where in May 1907 he won a Cresson Traveling Scholarship of $1,500 for two years' study abroad. In August that year, Ellett boarded the steamship Merion, leaving Philadelphia for Europe where he stayed until 1909, mostly at the American Academy in Rome.

By 1910, Ellett was in New York working as an architect, living in Mrs. Ackerson's boarding house at 17 Madison Avenue, next door to architect Stanford White's Madison Square Presbyterian Church. Ellett worked for several years at the firms of McKim, Mead & White and Benjamin Wistar Morris before establishing his own practice. The 1915 New York City Directory includes the entry: "Thos H. Ellett, archt, 51 Mad av."

== World War I ==
In August 1917, Ellett was stationed at the reserve officers' training camp at Fort Myer, when he married Jane Poultney Bigelow, the daughter of John Bigelow, Jr., a retired Lieutenant Colonel in the U.S. Army. Her brother, Captain Braxton Bigelow of the British Royal Engineers, had been killed in action in France just a few weeks earlier, on July 23, 1917.

During the war, Ellett served with the rank of lieutenant, then as captain in the 302nd U.S. Engineers, 77th Division. In March 1918, the regiment left Camp Upton, traveled to Manhattan and departed on the R.M.S. Carmania, arriving at Liverpool on April 12. From Liverpool, the regiment traveled by train to Dover and on April 14 crossed the English Channel to Calais. According to one account, in the summer of 1918, "...Lieut. T.H. Ellett had a very narrow escape. A mustard-gas shell exploded in the room where he was sleeping. By the greatest good fortune, Lieutenant Ellett was wearing his gas mask at the time; otherwise, he would most certainly have been killed."

On November 11, 1918, at the war's end, Ellett was cited for bravery, and in February 1919 an Iowa newspaper reported: "Captain Harlan Ellett, formerly of Red Oak...who has been serving in the army in France has been called to Paris to act in the capacity of architect on the peace committee." In April 1919, the regiment returned home and later that year Ellett co-authored a volume of the 302nd Engineer's activities during the war.

== Between the wars ==
In 1922, Ellett won an honorable mention in the Chicago Tribune Building Competition, won by his fellow New York architects John Mead Howells and Raymond Hood.

In 1926, he completed Merriewold, a grand house on River Road, Highland Park, New Jersey, built for J. Seward Johnson. According to one newspaper report: "The roofs of the residence contain 500 tons of slate imported from the Cotswold district of England. The slate is the same as is used in many of the Oxford colleges of England, and is not to be found in this country," and "The main stairway, of spiral design, is copied after one in the old Philadelphia City Hall," and "The key to the house weighs two pounds."

In the late 1920s, in collaboration with the sculptor Paul Manship, Ellett designed a memorial peristyle with a flanking chapel and museum, as well as other architectural features at the St. Mihiel American Cemetery and Memorial, Thiaucourt, Meurthe-et-Moselle, France. The project was approved by the National Commission of Fine Arts by 1930, and completed by 1934.

In 1928, Ellett won the Architectural League of New York's Silver Medal for Merriewold, and in 1933, he won the League's Gold Medal for his largest project, the ten-story Cosmopolitan Club at 122 East 66th Street in New York City.

In the 1930s, when opportunities for architects were scarce, Ellett worked as a consultant to the Office of the Supervising Architect for the U.S. Treasury, where he designed several distinguished government buildings, including post offices in the Bronx, New York, in Huntington, New York, and in Vidalia, Georgia, as well as a courthouse building in Anderson, South Carolina and a combined post office and courthouse in Covington, Kentucky.

== World War II ==
Ellett retired from practice in 1941. In July 1942, he was appointed assistant to Brig. Gen. Arthur S. Conklin, deputy state director of civilian protection in Rochester, New York. In 1942, Ellett was elected to the National Academy of Design as an Associate member (he became a full Academician in 1945). In 1943, Ellett was made a member of the National Institute of Arts and Letters.

Ellett died on November 24, 1951, at Garrison, New York, where he was buried in St. Philip's Cemetery.

== Architectural works ==
- Minot Monument, Goshen, New York, with sculptor Charles Keck, dedicated May 1912.
- Clarence T. Barrett Memorial, Staten Island, New York, with Sherry Edmundson Fry, sculptor, dedicated November 20, 1915.
- "Red Oak," the Henry W. Hardon Residence, Ridgefield Road, Wilton, Connecticut, alterations and additions about 1917.
- Wilton Public Library, Wilton, Connecticut, dedicated on July 4, 1918, while Ellett was stationed in France.
- Garage and Farm Building for E. Mortimer Barnes, Glen Head, New York, built 1919.
- "Mañana," later known as “Normandy Farms,” the E. Mortimer Barnes Residence, Glen Head, New York, built 1914–1920; gardens designed by Annette Hoyt Flanders in 1924.
- "Ca Va," the Carroll B. Alker Residence, Cedar Swamp Road, Old Brookville, New York, completed in 1924.
- Donald H. Cowl Residence, Port Washington, New York, completed about 1924.
- D.C. Prince Residence, Schenectady, New York, completed 1926.
- "Merriewold," the J. Seward Johnson Residence, Highland Park, New Jersey, completed in 1926.
- The Mather Homestead, Darien, Connecticut, restored in 1927.
- "Mouse's Hall," the Frederic & Minere (Mary Blair Wardwell) Cunningham Jr. Residence, Springfield Centre, New York, completed in 1927.
- "Brookwood," the Henry M. Minton Residence, Manhasset, New York, completed 1929.
- Cosmopolitan Club, East 66th Street, New York City, completed in 1932.
- Memorial peristyle with flanking chapel and map room, and other architectural features at the St. Mihiel American Cemetery and Memorial, Thiaucourt, Meurthe-et-Moselle, France, in collaboration with Paul Manship, sculptor, completed 1934.
- Vidalia Post Office, Vidalia, Georgia, completed 1935 (now Municipal Building).
- Bronx General Post Office, 558 Grand Concourse, New York City, cornerstone 1935, completed 1937; murals by Ben Shahn and Bernarda Bryson.
- U.S. Post Office, South Norwalk, Connecticut, completed 1937.
- Faculty House, Williams College, Williamstown, Massachusetts, completed 1938.
- Federal Courthouse Building, Anderson, South Carolina, completed 1938.
- Huntington Post Office, Huntington, New York, built in 1939, with a mural of Huntington Harbor by Paul Chapman; sold to a private owner in 1978.
- Covington Post Office and Courthouse, Covington, Kentucky, completed in 1941, designed in association with Louis A. Simon. The building is embellished with architectural sculpture by Carl L. Schmitz; the interior with a statue of "Justice" by Romuald Kraus (1891–1954).

== Gallery ==
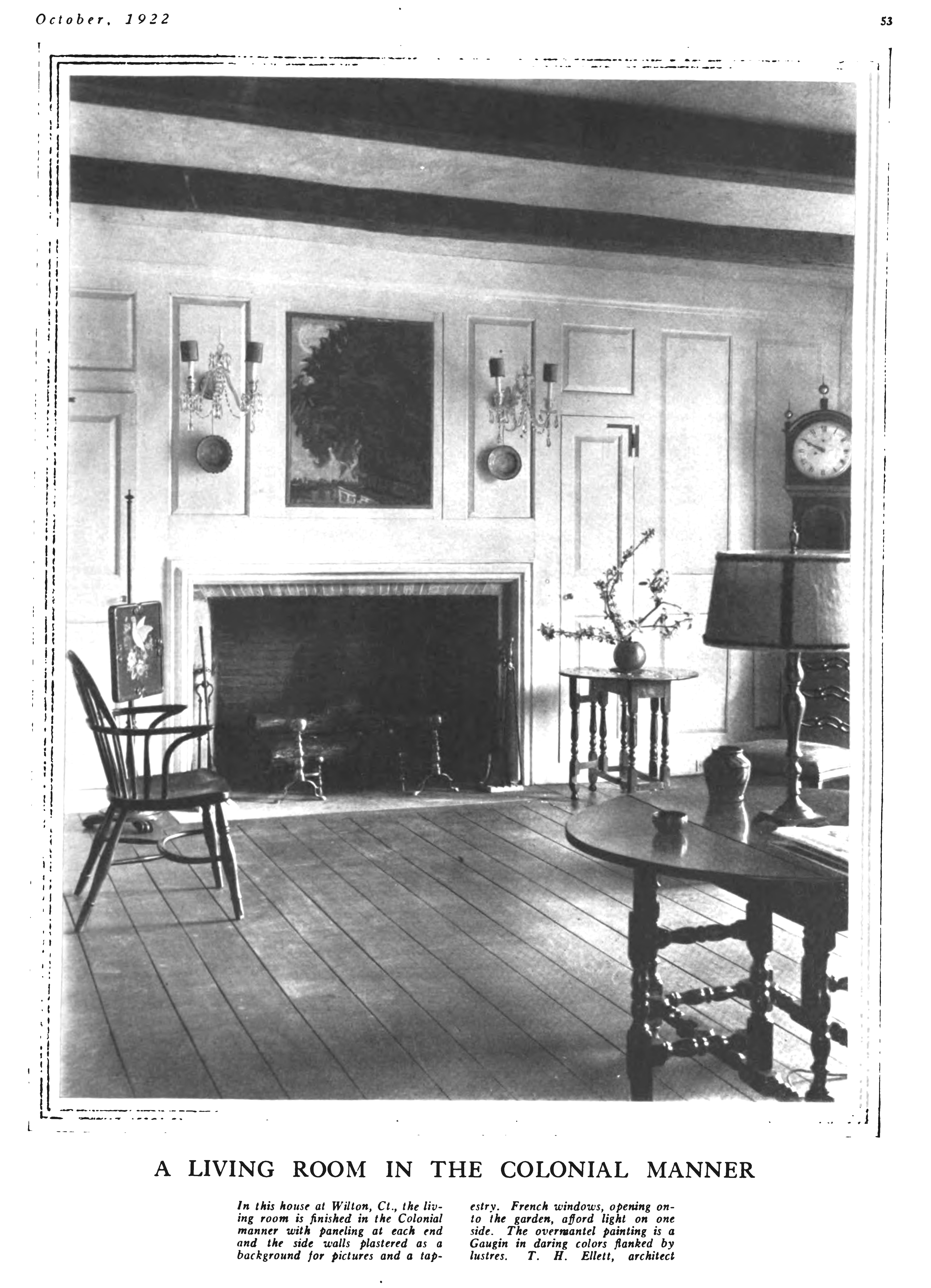
H.W. Hardon Residence, Wilton, Connecticut, Alterations and Additions, 1917.

A study model of a residence, published in 1918.

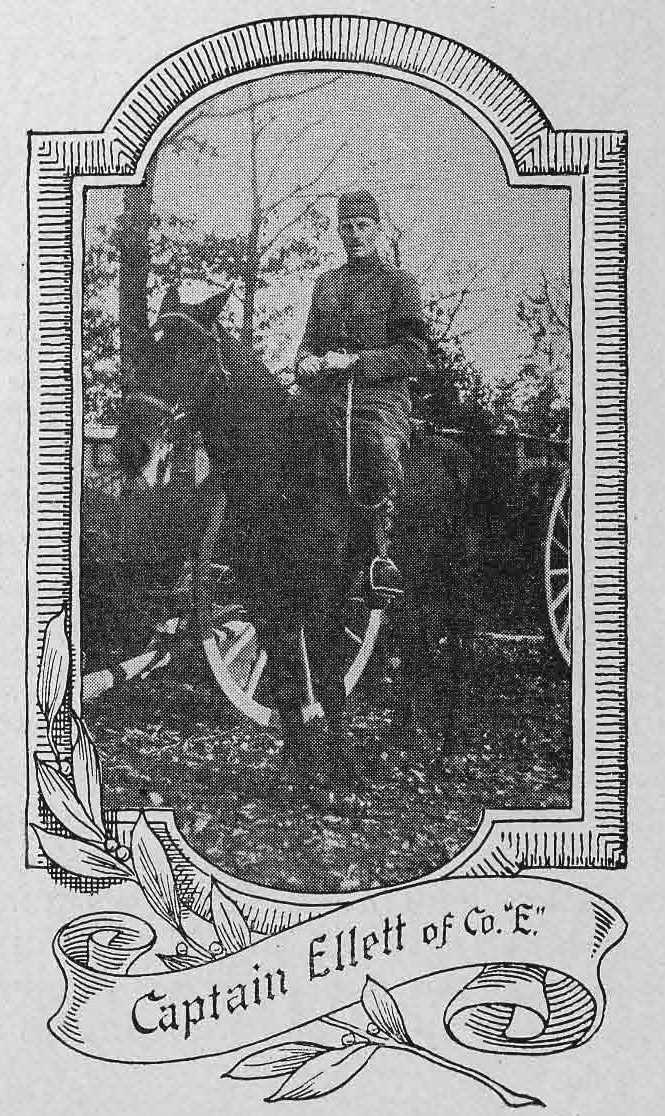
Thomas Harlan Ellett in France during the First World War.

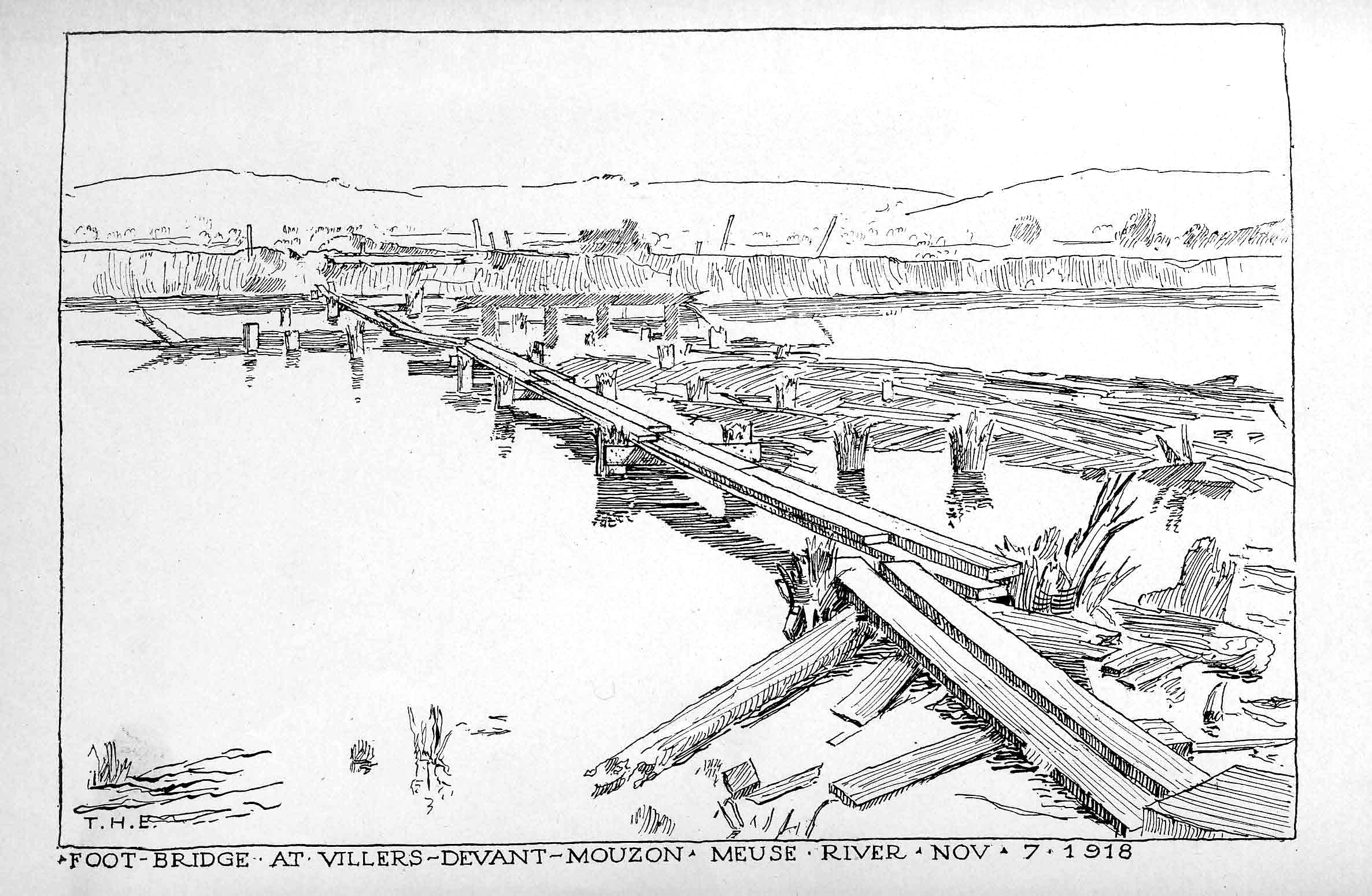
A drawing by T.H. Ellett in France, in November 1918.

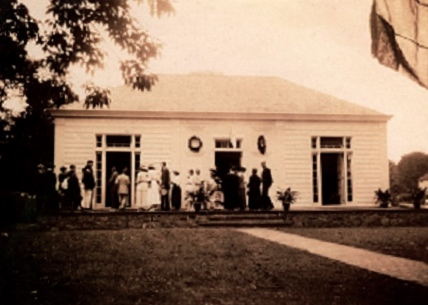
Wilton Public Library, Wilton, Connecticut, 1918 Dedication (Courtesy of Wilton Library History Room).

Garage and Farm Building for E. Mortimer Barnes, Glen Head, New York, built 1919.

Architectural Elevation of Garage and Farm Building at Glen Head, New York.

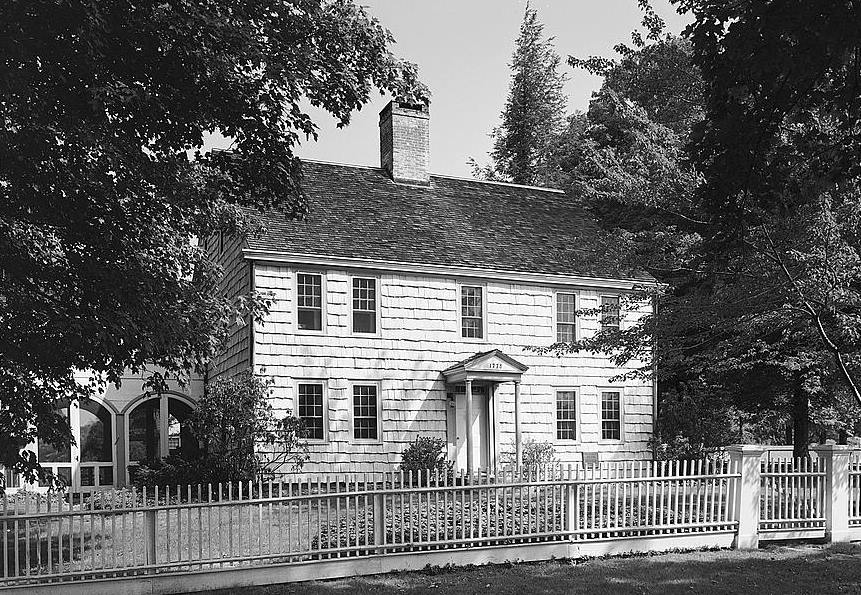
The Mather Homestead, Darien, Connecticut, restored 1927.

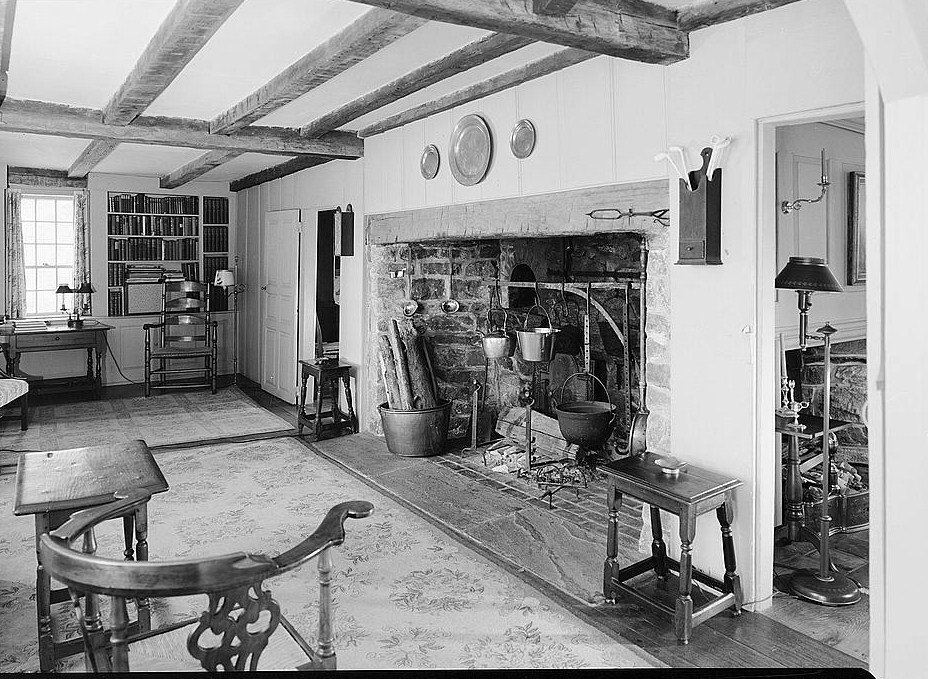
Living Room at the Mather Homestead, designed by Ellett in 1927.

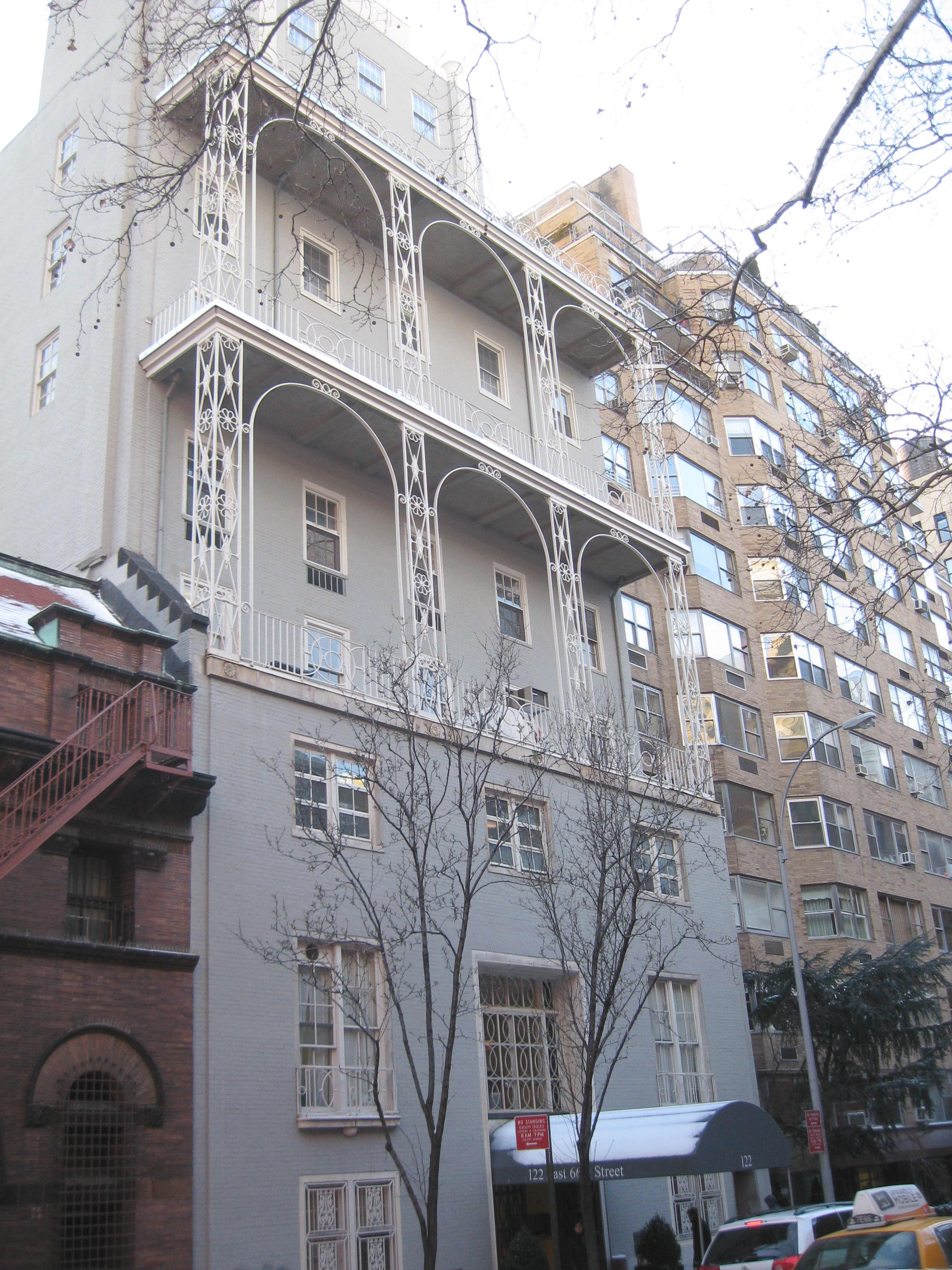
The Cosmopolitan Club, New York City, completed in 1932.

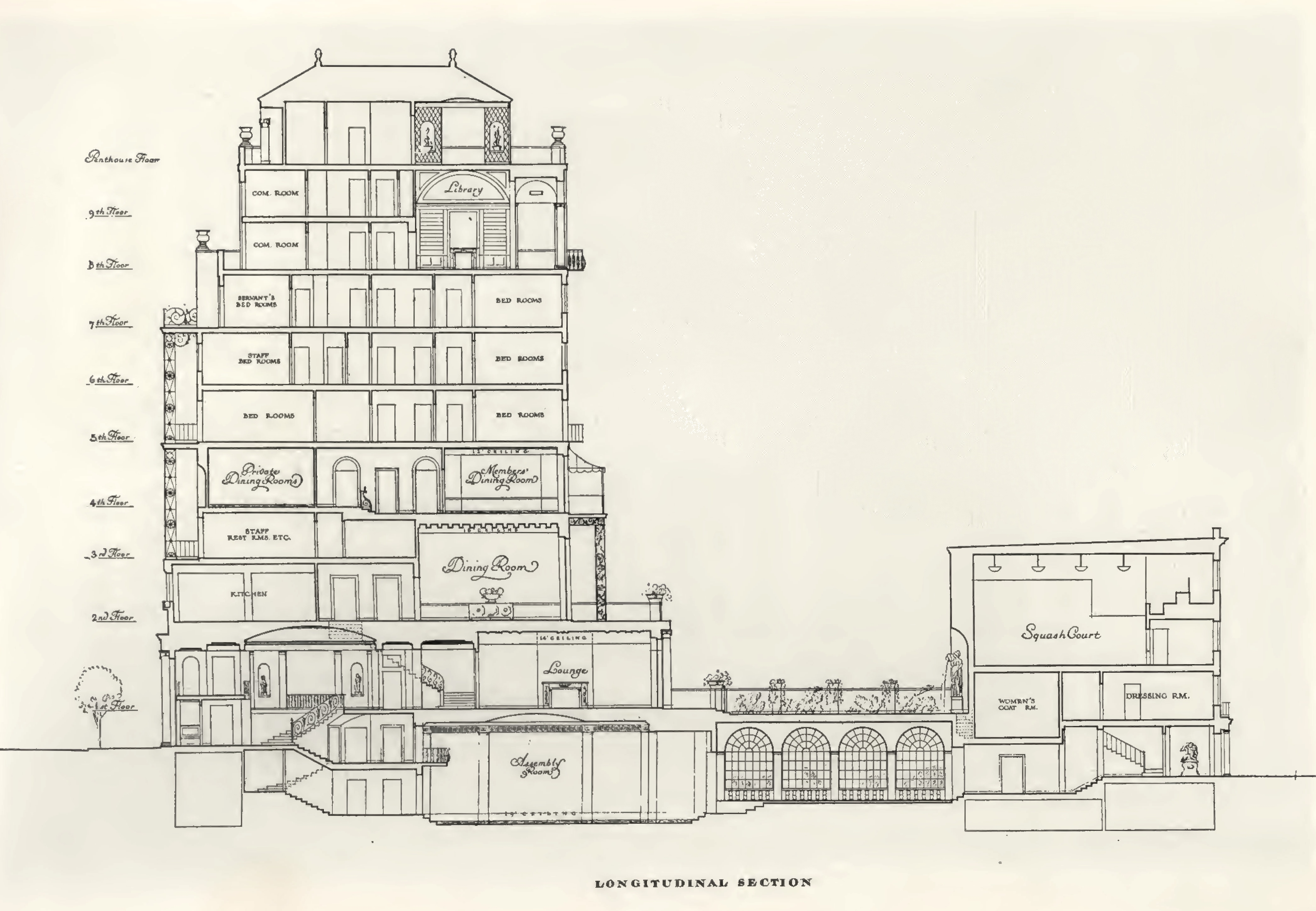
An architectural drawing of the Cosmopolitan Club, New York City.

Floor Plans of the Cosmopolitan Club, New York City.

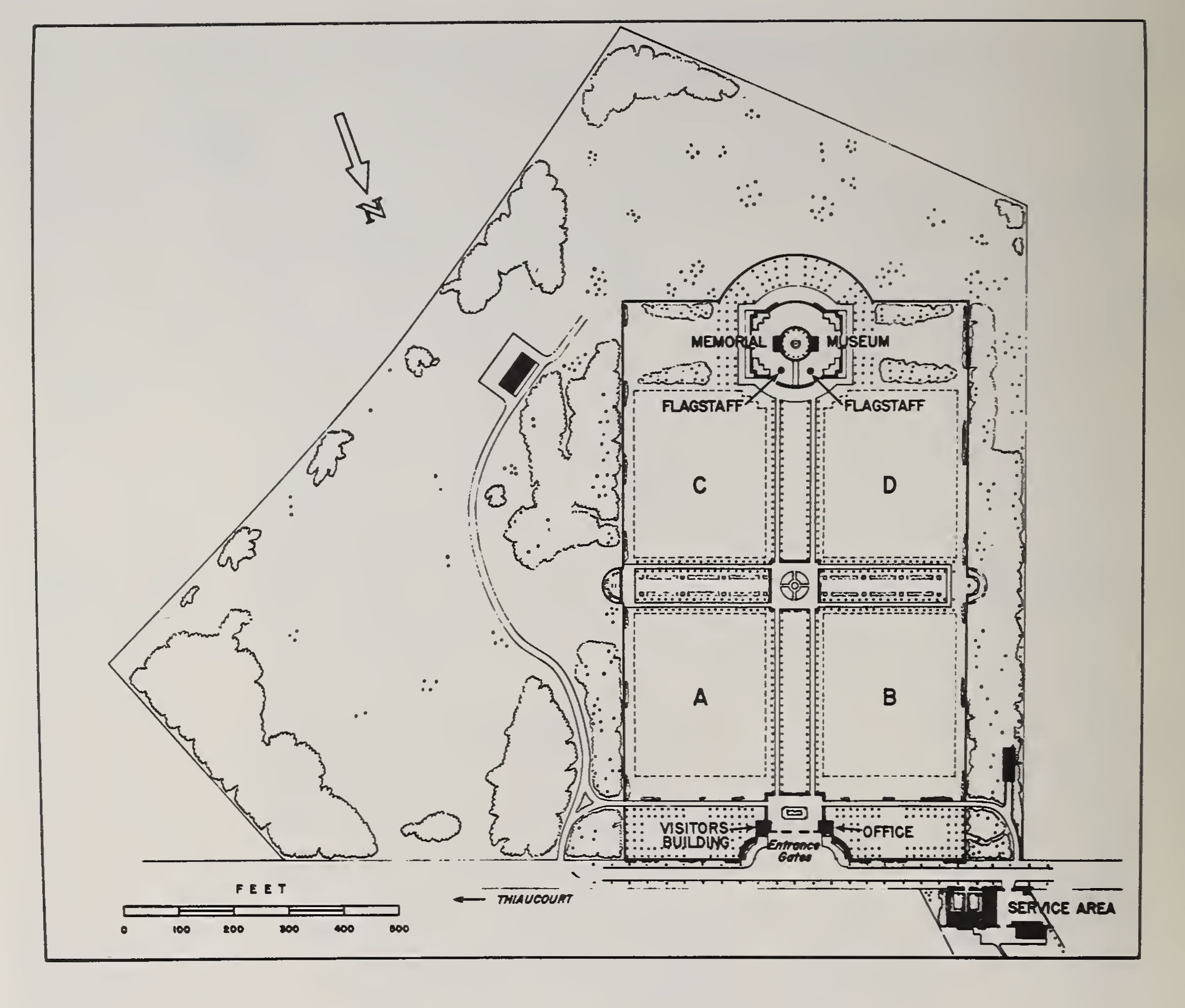
Site Plan of Saint Mihiel American Cemetery, Thiaucourt, France, completed 1934.

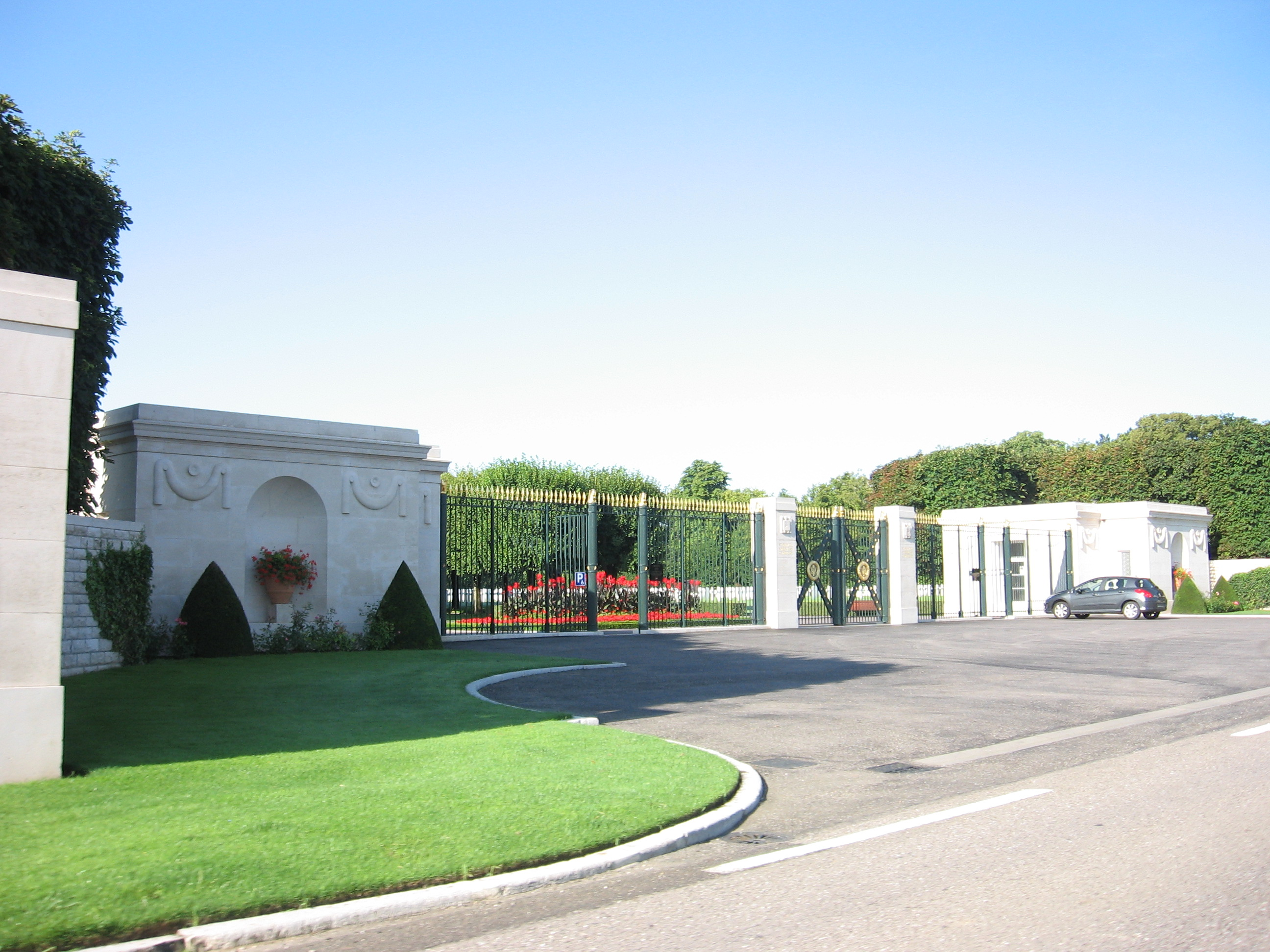
Entrance to the Saint Mihiel American Cemetery, Thiaucourt, France, completed 1934.

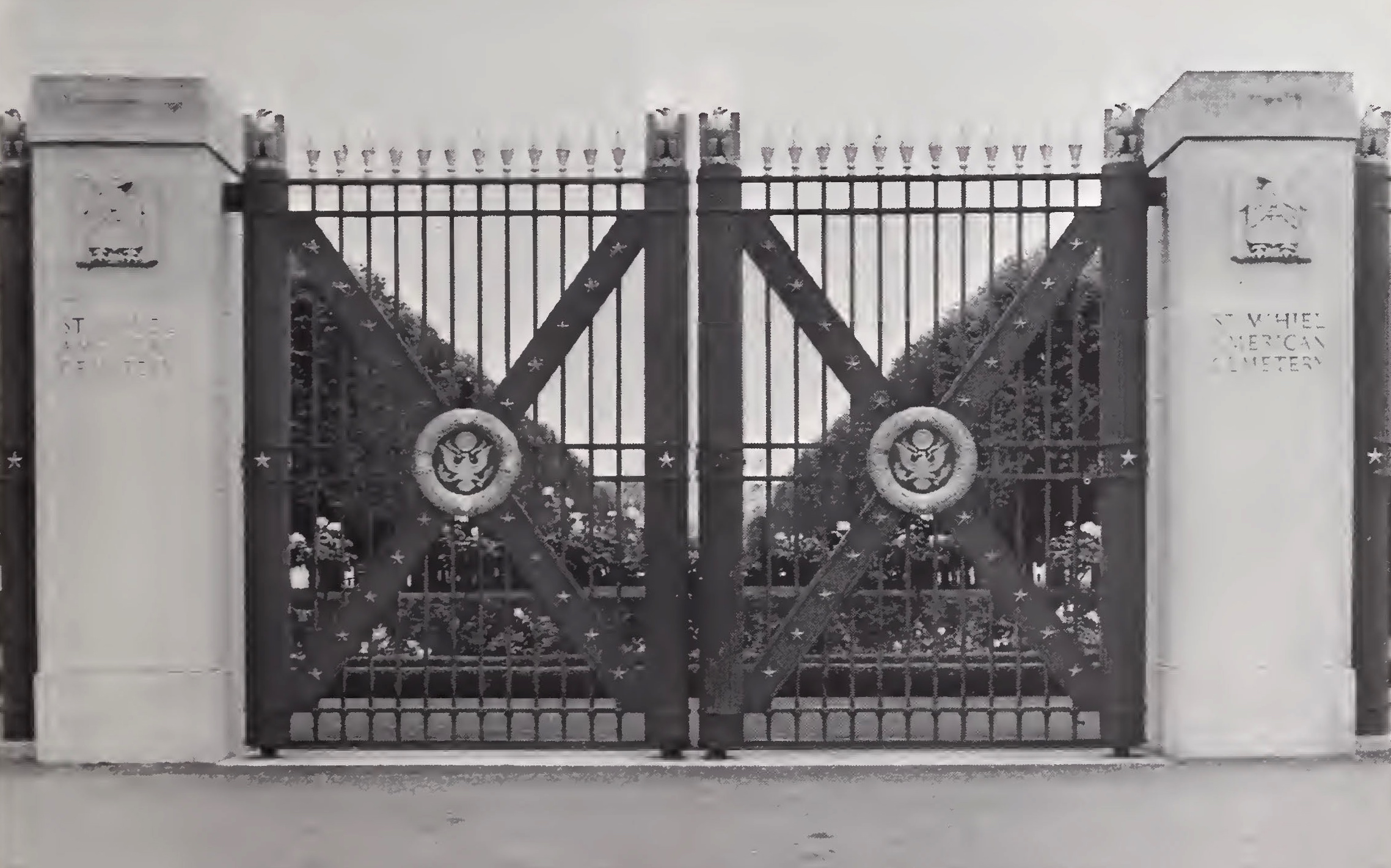
Entrance Gate to the Saint Mihiel American Cemetery, Thiaucourt, France, completed 1934.

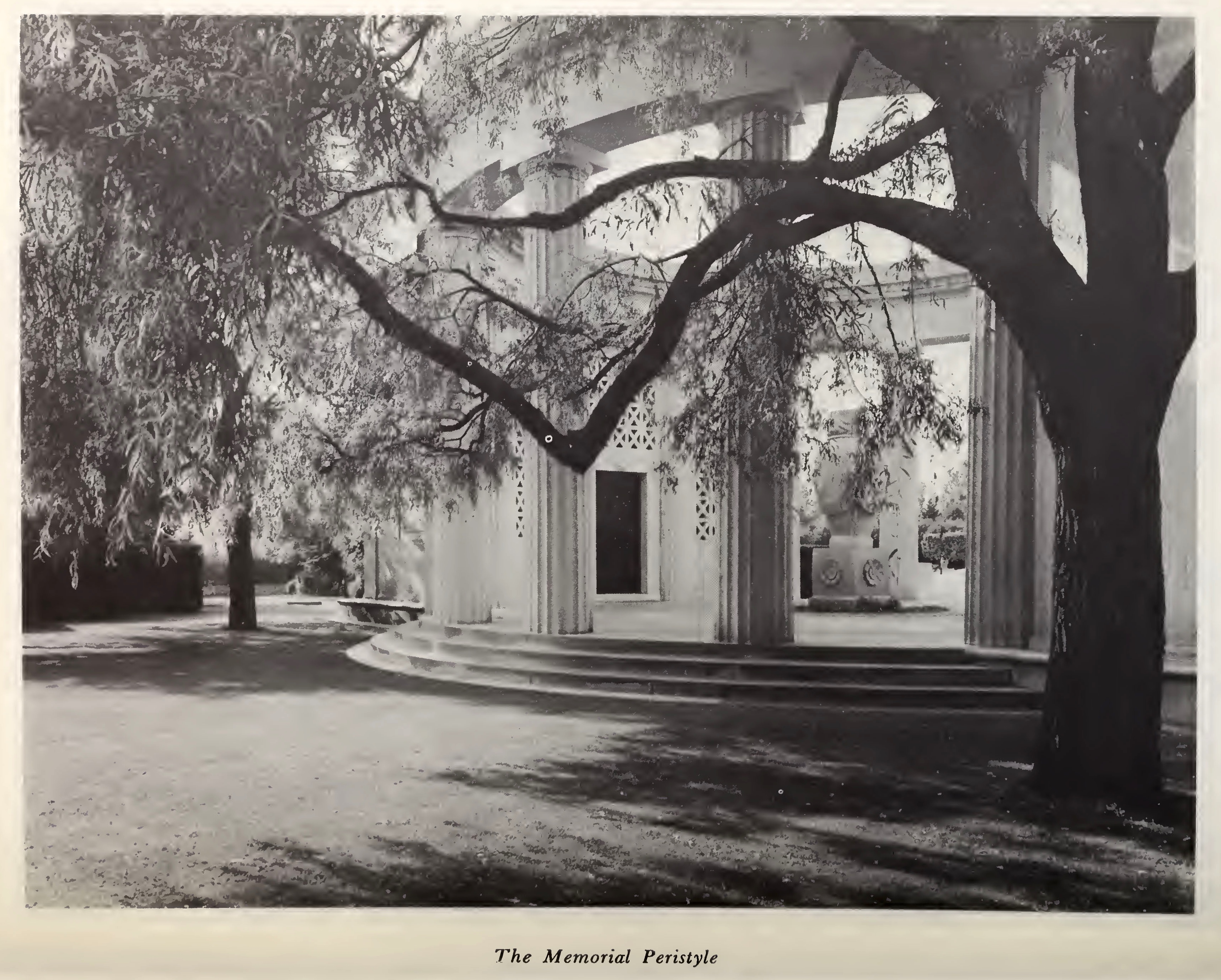
Peristyle at the Saint Mihiel American Cemetery, Thiaucourt, France, completed 1934.

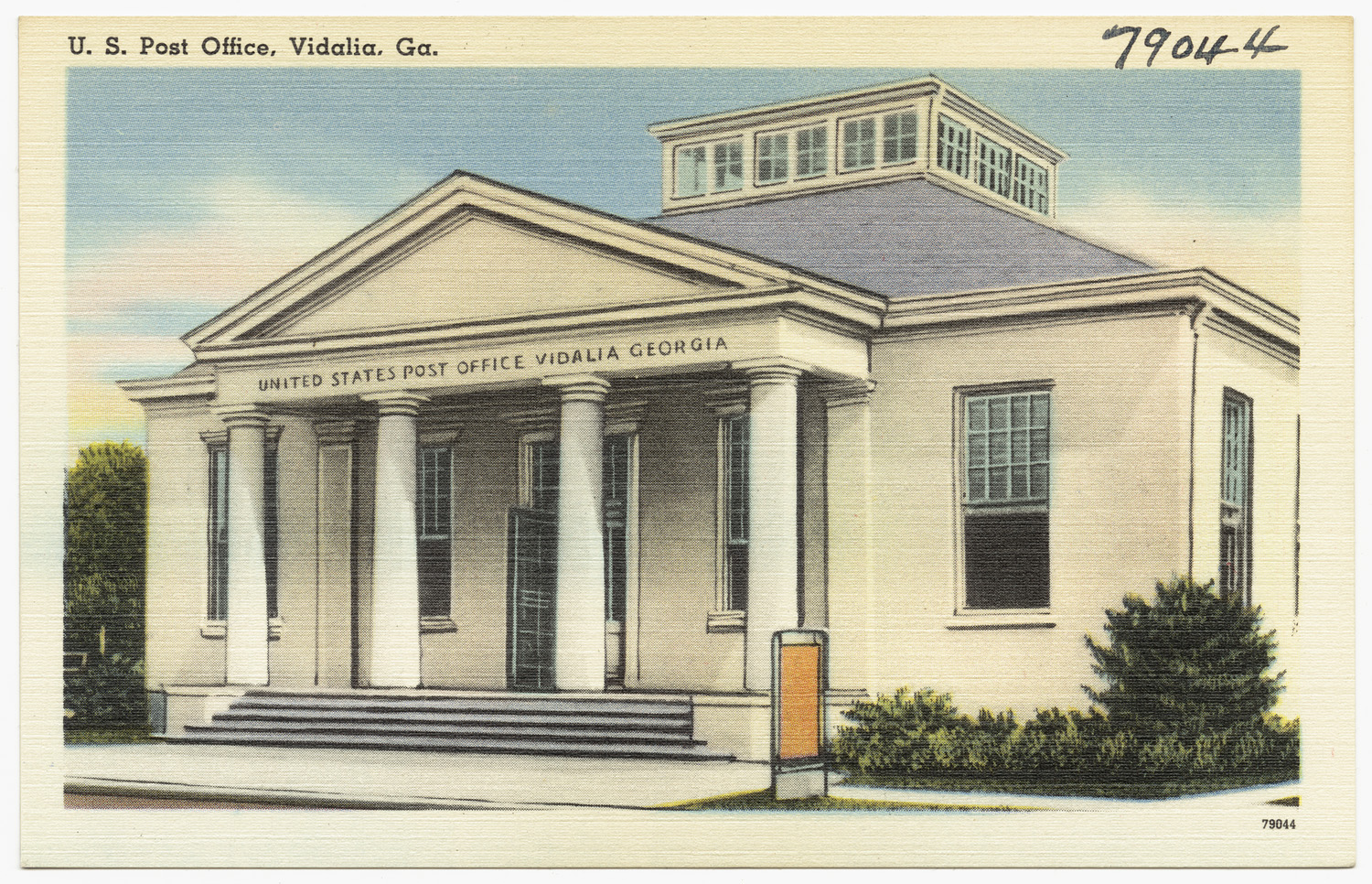
Post Office, Vidalia, Georgia, completed 1935 (now Municipal Building).

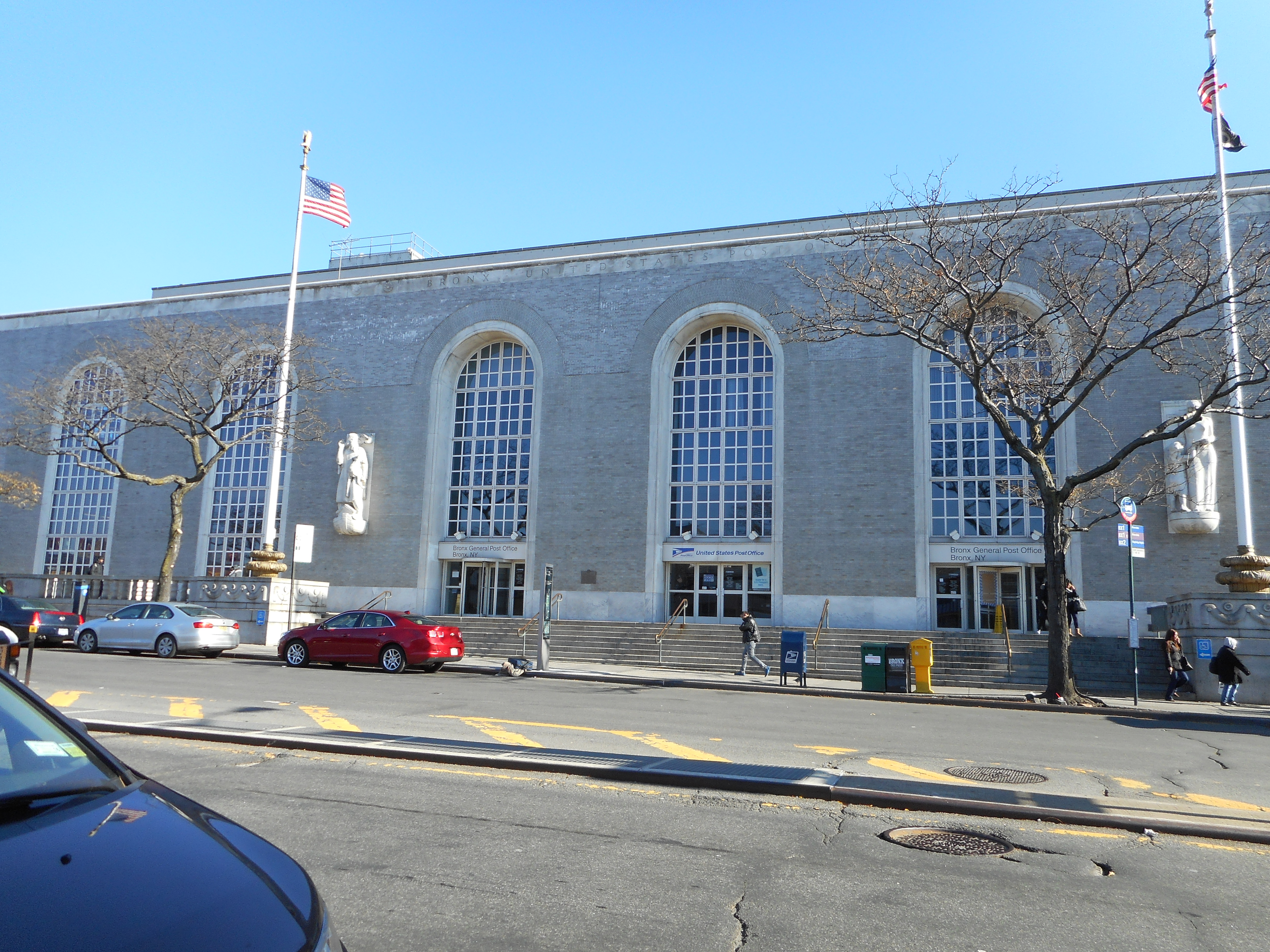
Bronx Post Office, New York City, completed 1937.

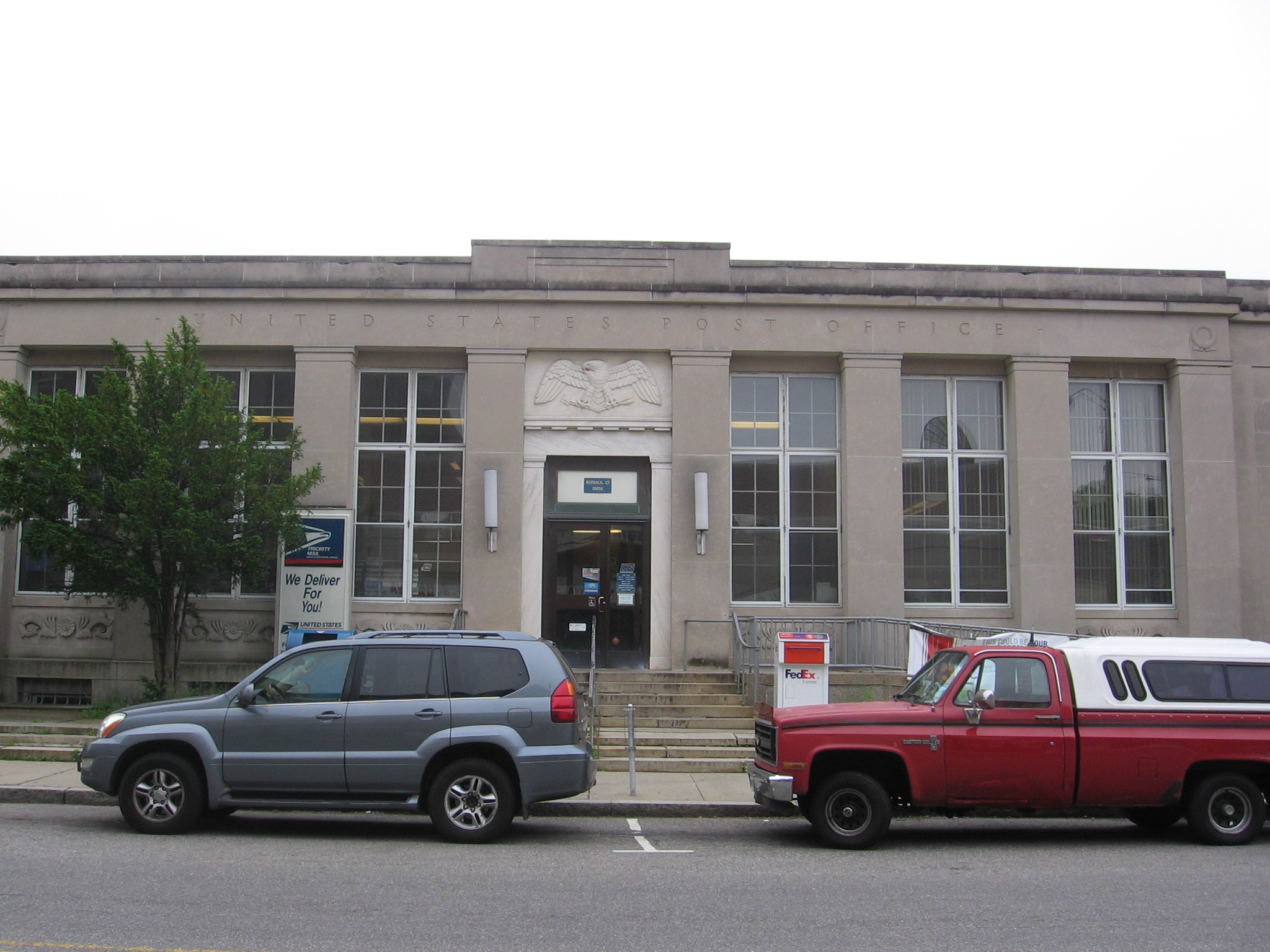
U.S. Post Office at South Norwalk, Connecticut, completed 1937.

Faculty Club, Williams College, Williamstown, Massachusetts, completed in 1938.

Faculty Club, Williams College, Williamstown, Massachusetts, completed in 1938.

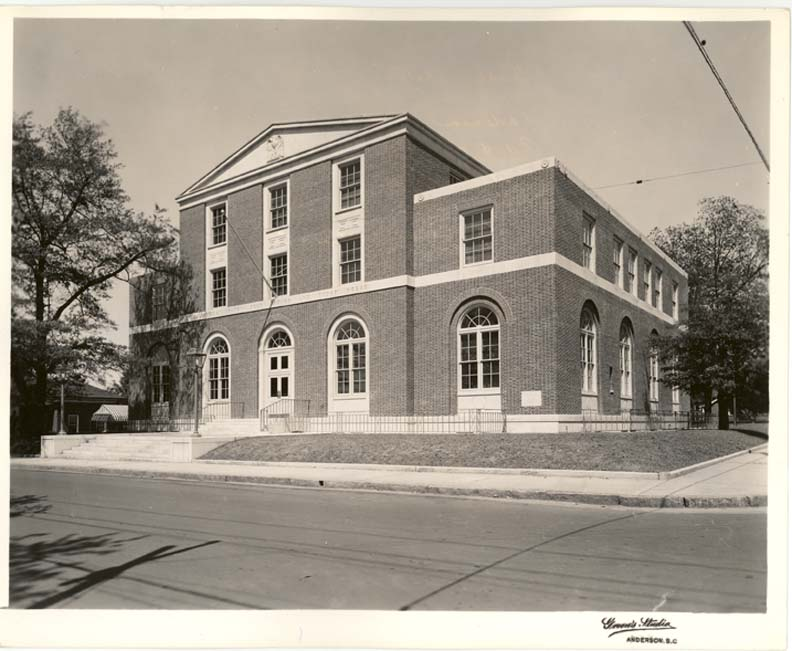
Federal Courthouse Building, Anderson, South Carolina, built 1938.

The Post Office, Huntington, New York, completed in 1939.

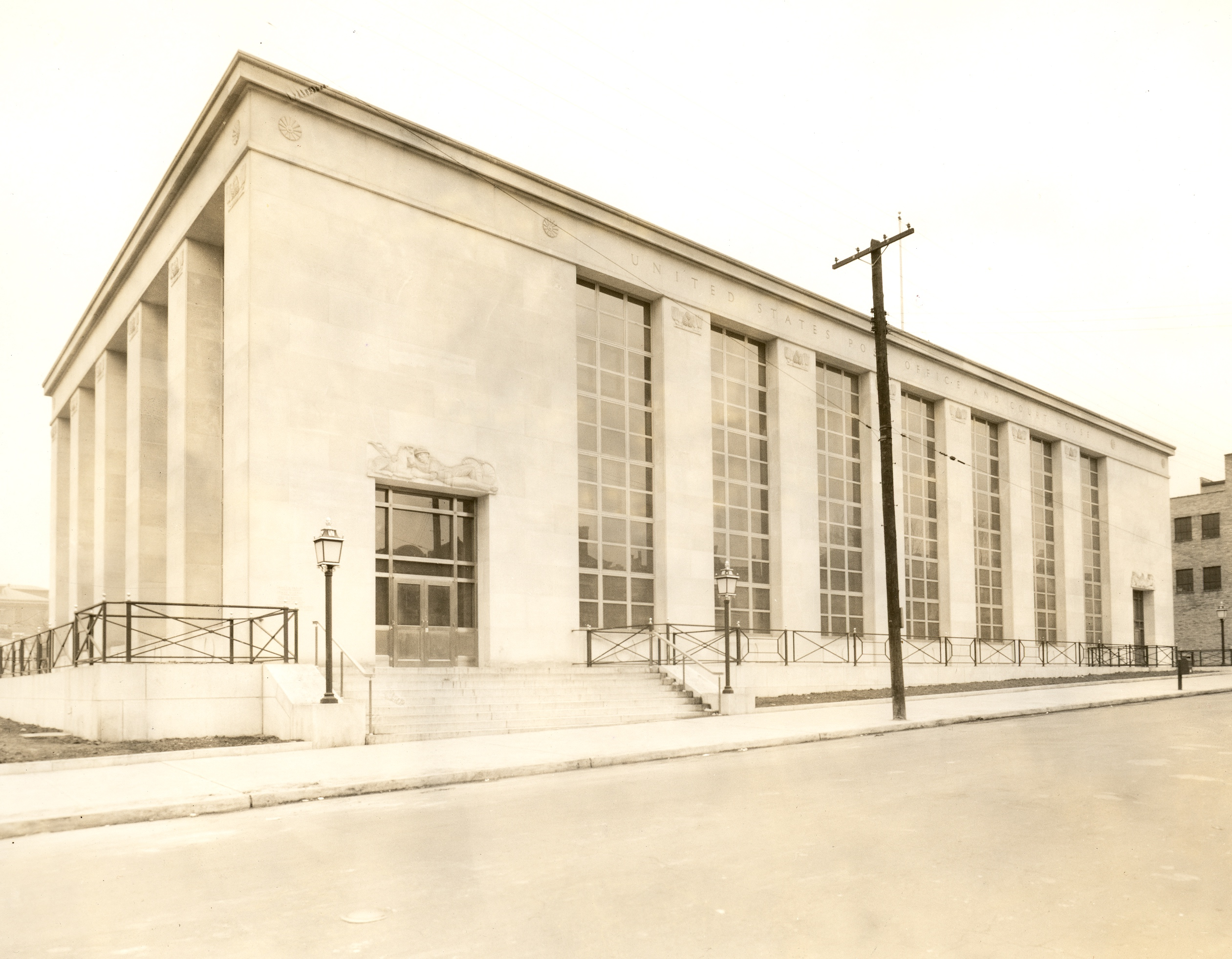
U.S. Post Office, Covington, Kentucky, completed 1941.
