= Dodge Island =

Island in Miami, Florida, United States

Coordinates: 25°46′20.56″N 80°9′58.34″W

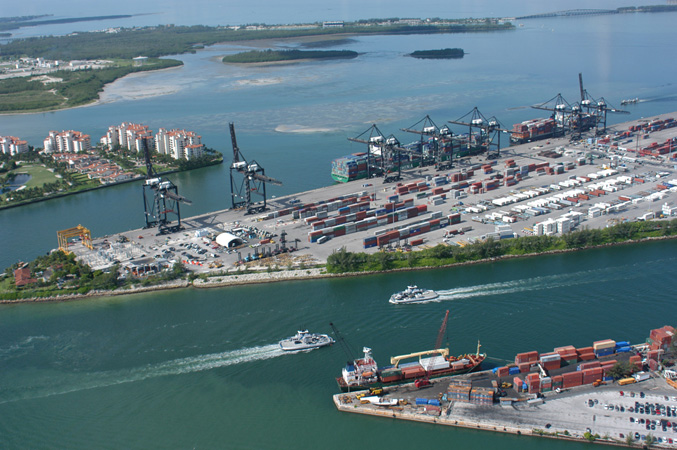
Eastern end of Dodge Island showing Port of Miami shipping containers.

Dodge Island is an artificial island near downtown Miami, Florida, United States. The Port of Miami is located on, what was, Dodge, Lummus and Sam Islands, and has berths for both cruise and cargo ships.

The original and much smaller Dodge Island was created during the dredging of Government Cut in the early 1900s. According to The Miami News, the island went unnamed until 1950 when Mr. and Mrs. Ray Dodge of Wisconsin, friends of Frank Stearns, director of the City of Miami Planning Board, were visiting and asked what the island was called and, "unable to come up with a name of the island ... Stearns gave the parcel of land its present name." The current island was formed by further filling which combined Dodge Island with two other man-made islands, Lummus Island and Sam's Island. Dodge, Lummus, and Sam's Island is now generally known as Port of Miami.

== Geography ==
It was located in Biscayne Bay between Miami and Miami Beach.

== See also ==
- Port of Miami
- Port Boulevard
- Port of Miami Tunnel
