= Port Tunnel =

Port Tunnel may refer to:

- Dublin Port Tunnel, in Ireland
- Port Miami Tunnel, in Florida, US
