= Florida State Road 886 =

Highway in Florida

State Road 886
- Port Boulevard

Route information
- Maintained by FDOT
- Length: 0.826 mi (1,329 m)
- Existed: 1980–present

Major junctions
- West end: US 1 in Miami
- East end: Port of Miami

Location
- Country: United States
- State: Florida
- Counties: Miami-Dade

Highway system
- Florida State Highway System; Interstate; US; State; Former; Pre‑1945; Toll; Scenic
← SR 884	→ SR 887

State Road 886 (SR 886), also known as Port Boulevard, is a causeway connecting the Port of Miami with downtown Miami, Florida. Its western terminus is an intersection with U.S. Route 1 (US 1 or Biscayne Boulevard) just north of Bayside Marketplace, and its eastern terminus is at the Port of Miami entrance. It received its FDOT designation in 1980.

== Route description ==
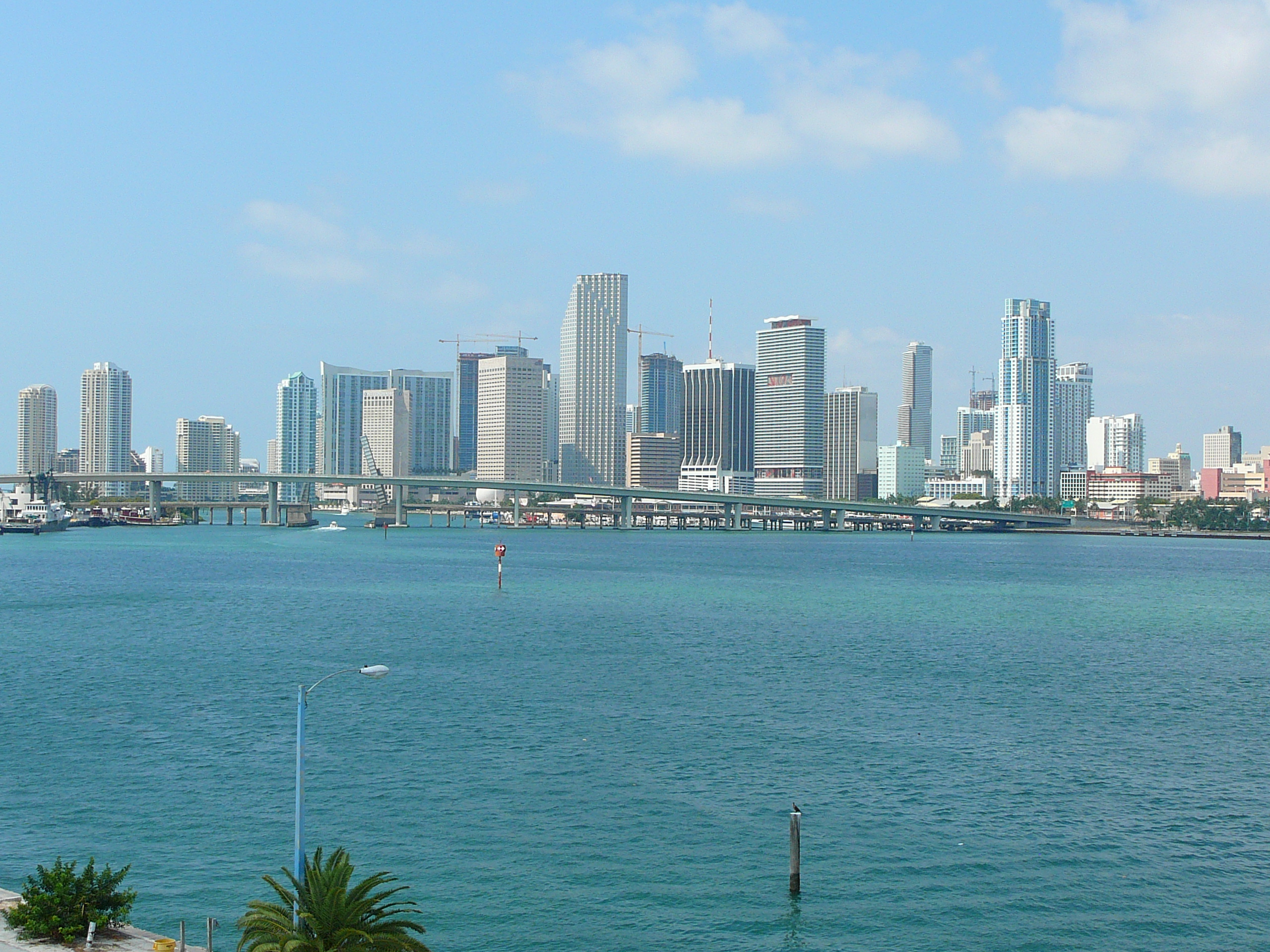
View of the Port Boulevard Bridge from the MacArthur Causeway Bridge; a partial view of the Downtown Miami skyline is in the background

State Road 886 begins where Port Boulevard and 6th Street intersect Biscayne Boulevard, which carries U.S. Route 1. Port and 6th are, for 400 feet (120 m), a couplet of one-way streets before they join as Port Boulevard. The road passes Kaseya Center and ascends the approach of the Port Boulevard Bridge over Biscayne Bay. On the other side of the bridge, SR 886 ends at the entrance to the Port of Miami.

== History ==
This road was signed as SR 886 in 1980.

Prior to the construction of the current high-level causeway, which replaced an older causeway with a drawbridge, a tunnel connecting the Port of Miami and Interstate 95 was contemplated as a replacement instead, but failed to attract support from the City of Miami commission.

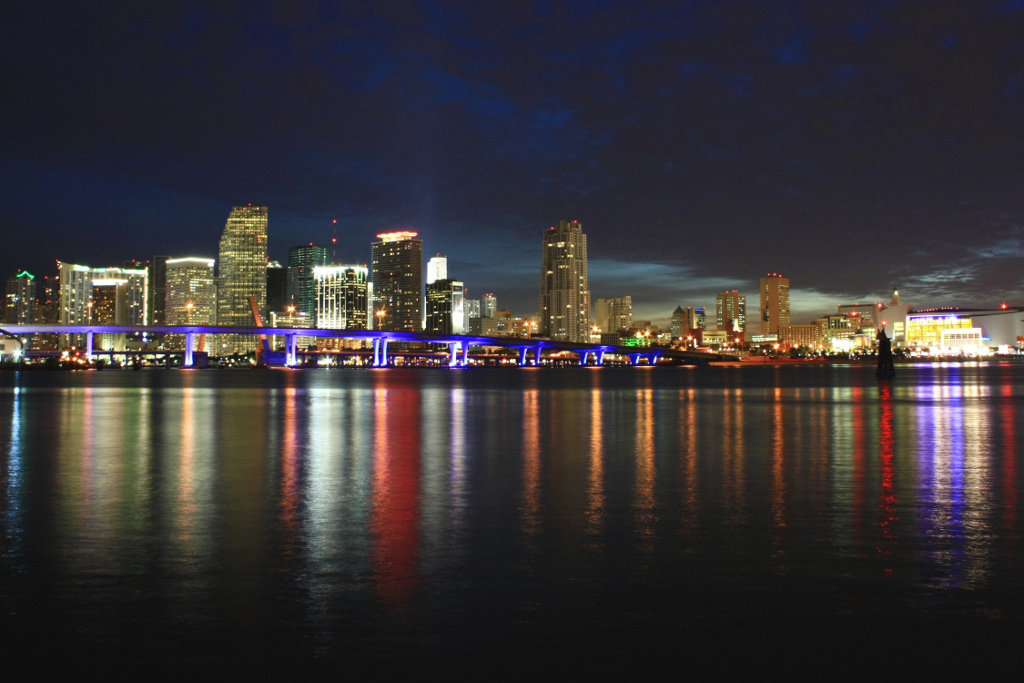
The Port Boulevard Bridge and downtown lights reflected on Biscayne Bay at twilight

A similar proposal for a tunnel connecting the port with SR A1A on nearby Watson Island was made in the 2000s and eventually approved and on May 24, 2010, construction began on the Miami Port Tunnel.

== Major intersections ==
The entire route is in Miami, Miami-Dade County.

mi	km	Destinations	Notes
0.000	0.000	US 1 (Biscayne Boulevard / US 41 / SR 5) – Miami Beach To Northeast 6th Street / I-95 / I-395 / SR 836 – Airport	
0.209– 0.683	0.336– 1.099	Port Boulevard Bridge over Biscayne Bay (Atlantic Intracoastal Waterway)	
0.826	1.329	Port of Miami	
1.000 mi = 1.609 km; 1.000 km = 0.621 mi
