= Port Miami Tunnel =

Tunnel in Miami, Florida

Port of Miami Tunnel
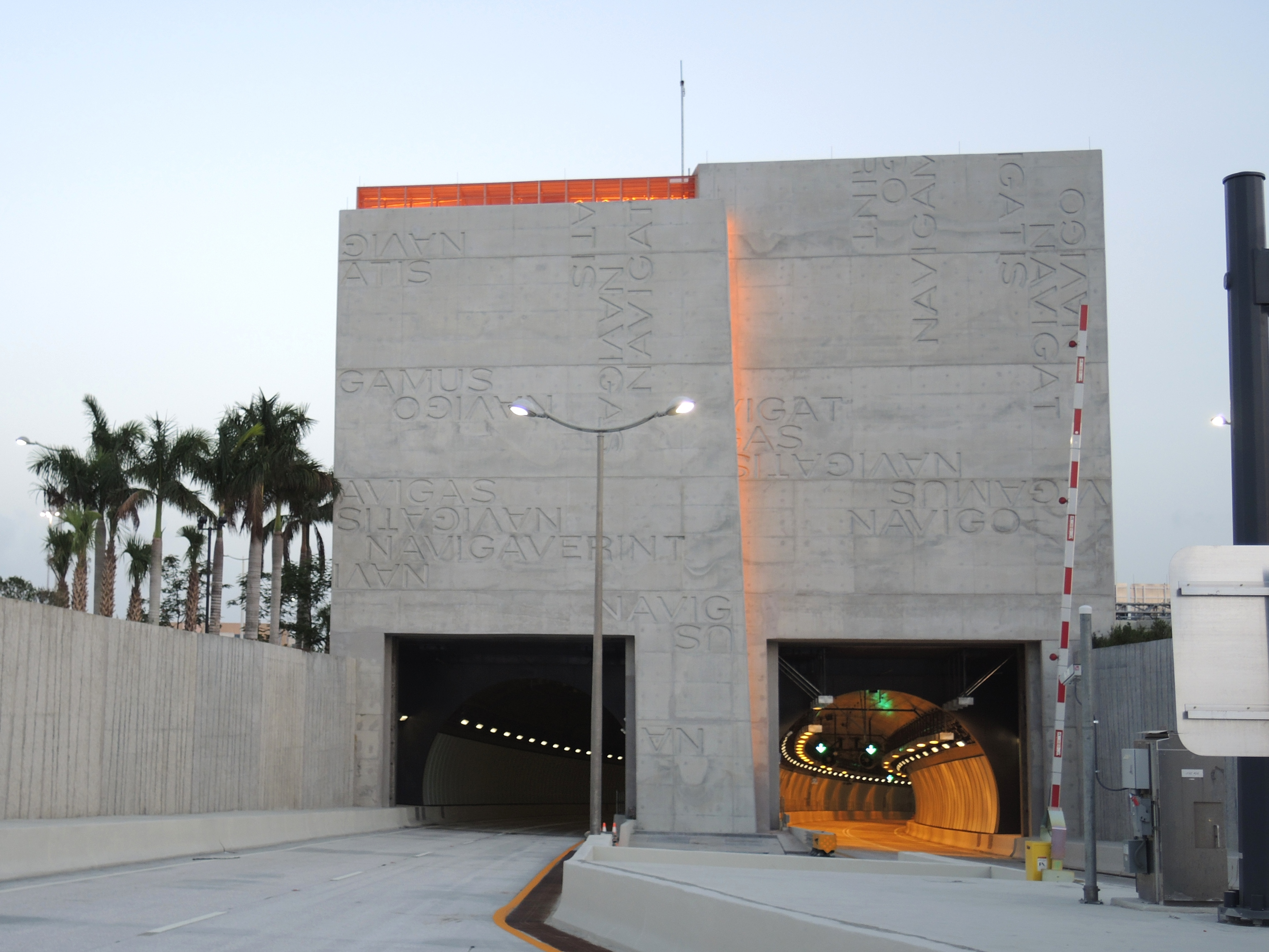
- Watson Island entrance
- Interactive map of Port of Miami Tunnel

Overview
- Location: Miami, Florida
- Route: SR 887
- Start: Watson Island
- End: Dodge Island

Operation
- Work began: May 24, 2010
- Constructed: Bouygues Construction
- Opened: August 3, 2014
- Owner: FDOT
- Operator: MAT Concessionaire, LLC
- Traffic: Automotive
- Toll: None
- Vehicles per day: 7000 (August 2014)

Technical
- Length: 4,200 feet (1,300 m)
- No. of lanes: 2 (per tunnel)
- Operating speed: 35 miles per hour
- Max elevation: Sea level
- Min elevation: −120 feet (−37 m)
- Tunnel clearance: 15 feet (4.6 m)
- Width: 43 feet (13 m) per tunnel
- Grade: 5%
- portofmiamitunnel.com

State Road 887
- SR 887 highlighted in black

Route information
- Maintained by FDOT
- Existed: 2014–present

Major junctions
- South end: Port Boulevard on Dodge Island
- North end: SR A1A (MacArthur Causeway) on Watson Island

Location
- Country: United States
- State: Florida

Highway system
- Florida State Highway System; Interstate; US; State; Former; Pre‑1945; Toll; Scenic
← SR 886	→ SR 907

The Port of Miami Tunnel (State Road 887) is a 4,200-foot (1,300 m) bored, undersea tunnel in Miami, Florida. It consists of two parallel tunnels (one in each direction) that travel beneath Biscayne Bay, connecting the MacArthur Causeway on Watson Island with PortMiami on Dodge Island. It was built in a public–private partnership between three government entities—the Florida Department of Transportation, Miami-Dade County, and the City of Miami—and the private entity MAT Concessionaire LLC, which was in charge of designing, building, and financing the project and holds a 30-year concession to operate the tunnel.

The project was approved after decades of planning and discussion in December 2007, but was temporarily cancelled a year later. Construction began in May 2010. The tunnel boring machine began work in November 2011 and completed the second tunnel in May 2013. The tunnel was opened to traffic on August 3, 2014. In the first month after opening, the tunnel averaged 7,000 vehicles per day traveling to the port on a typical weekday.

== History ==
The idea of a tunnel connecting the Port of Miami to Watson Island was first conceived in the 1980s to reduce traffic congestion in downtown Miami. Prior to the tunnel's opening, the only route for PortMiami traffic was a two-lane drawbridge that emptied into downtown Miami streets. Heavy traffic was considered detrimental to downtown's economic growth, and a planned port expansion threatened to increase the volume of trucks passing through. These problems were alleviated, but not solved, by the construction of a six-lane elevated bridge in the early 1990s. The issues would be remedied by the construction of the tunnel, allowing traffic to move between PortMiami and the MacArthur Causeway (which connects to Interstate 95 via I-395) without traveling through downtown.

Federal funding for a preliminary study into the tunnel proposal was included in the controversial 1987 highway bill, which was vetoed by President Ronald Reagan, who complained that the bill was a "pork-barrel" project. Although the veto was overridden, the tunnel proposal fell by the wayside. It was not until 2006 that the tender for the tunnel project was ready to be launched, and in December 2007 the project was approved by the City Commission. However, the economic crisis resulted in a cancellation of the project in December 2008 by one of the sponsors, Babcock & Brown, and the State of Florida. Despite this, in April 2009, following intense lobbying by Miami-Dade Mayor Carlos Alvarez, to avoid a new tender that would delay even further the start of construction, the project was reinstated. Port director Bill Johnson has also played a key role in supporting the Port of Miami infrastructure projects, as well as developing a free-trade pact with Colombia. The port infrastructure projects had an estimated cost of around $2 billion.

Prior to 2008, the project had been estimated at a total cost of $3.1 billion, however the revised project has an estimated cost of $1 billion (The difference in estimates partially due to differences in previous tunnel designs). Financial closing on the project was reached in October 2009. Miami-Dade County was reported to have contributed $402 million, the city of Miami $50 million, and the state $650 million to build, operate and maintain it. Those contributions are spread during the construction and operation of the tunnel project. During construction, 90% of the funds are provided by the private sector. Of the estimated $1 billion total project cost, $607 million would go to design and construction, $195.1 million to financing, $59.6 million to insurance and maintenance during construction, $41.2 million to reserves, and $209.8 million for state development cost.

== Overview ==
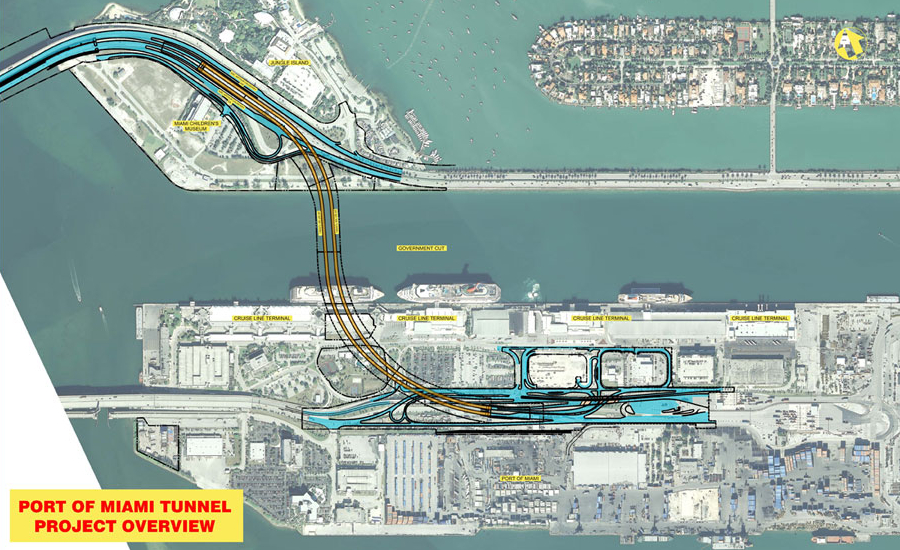
An overview of the Port Miami Tunnel project. In this map, the areas marked in orange signify the route of the tunnel, while areas marked in blue signify associated ramps and infrastructure.

The Port of Miami Tunnel project involved the design and widening of the MacArthur Causeway by one lane in each direction leading up to the tunnel entrance, the relocation of Parrot Jungle Trail, and the reconstruction of roadways on Dodge Island. The tunnel itself has two side-by-side tubes carrying traffic underneath the cruise ship channel of the Government Cut shipping lane. Jacobs Engineering Group was responsible for the design of the roadways, Langan Engineering & Environmental Services was the geotechnical engineer, and Bouygues was the prime contractor for the tunnel project itself. Chosen due to their key involvement in the construction of the Channel Tunnel, a major tunnel in Europe, the selection of Bouygues was also met with controversy and protested by the Cuban exile community in Miami, due to the company's involvement with locally opposed construction projects in Cuba.

The project connects the east/west Interstate 395 (I-395)/State Road 836, which terminates into State Route A1A at the Miami city limit on the MacArthur Causeway, as well as Interstate 95, directly to PortMiami. The port was previously only connected to the mainland by Port Boulevard, which is accessed by crossing U.S. Route 1 (Biscayne Boulevard) and traveling through downtown. The project also includes roadway improvements to the connection between I-395 and State Road 836, also known as the Dolphin Expressway, at Interstate 95. The tunnel will allow heavy trucks to bypass the congested Downtown Miami area, which is considered to be especially crucial with the large increase in trade traffic expected to be created by the Deep Dredge Project and the enlargement of the Panama Canal. Projected to eventually carry 26,000 vehicles a day under Government Cut through its twin two-lane tunnels, the top of the tunnels lie over 60 feet (18.3 m) below the seabed. The project created nearly 1,000 jobs as of 2011, with 70% reported as local; project executives promised that many of the construction jobs would go to local contractors. Along with the related Deep Dredge and Panama Canal Expansion, over 30,000 jobs are expected to be created in the long run.

Before the completion of the tunnel in 2009, nearly 16,000 vehicles traveled to and from PortMiami through downtown streets each weekday. 28% of the traffic consisted of trucks. In 2010, it was estimated that around 19,000 vehicles traveled to the port daily, with trucks accounting for 16% of the traffic. Existing truck and bus routes restricted the port's ability to grow, driving up costs for port users and presenting safety hazards. They were also thought to congest and limit redevelopment of Miami's Central Business District in the northern portion.

The Port of Miami Tunnel includes providing a direct connection from the Port of Miami to highways via Watson Island to I-395 and, along with the deep dredge, keeping the Port of Miami, the county's second largest economic generator (after Miami International Airport), supporting over 11,000 jobs directly with an average salary of $50,000, a competitive player in international trade. The Port of Miami provides 176,000 jobs, $6.4 billion in wages and $17 billion in economic output.

=== Public-private partnership (PPP) ===

The tunnel project is a public-private partnership (PPP or P3), designed to transfer the responsibility to design, build, finance, operate, and maintain the project to the private sector. Ten banks, BNP Paribas, Banco Bilbao Vizcaya Argentaria, RBS Citizens, N.A., Banco Santander, Bayerische Hypo, Calyon, Dexia, ING Capital, Societe Generale, and WestLB, will provide the senior debt financing for the project, which totals $341.5 million. The project attracted three bidding consortia. Under the concession agreement, FDOT will make milestone payments to the concessionaire (Miami Access Tunnel) during the construction period, upon the achievement of contractual milestones. 90% of Miami Access Tunnel's equity is provided by Meridiam Infrastructure Miami LLC (Luxembourg based Meridiam SARL); the remaining 10% by France's Bouygues Travaux Publics SA, operating as Dragages Concession Florida Inc. The Port of Miami Tunnel Project was one of the first P3s in Florida, and the first availability-based P3 deal in the US, after the Interstate 595 (I-595) renovation project in Broward County.

When construction is completed, FDOT will make availability payments to the concessionaire. These payments will be contingent upon actual lane availability and service quality: if the tunnel is closed or the road is in bad condition, part or all of the payment for that period may be withheld. The tunnel will be turned over to FDOT in first-class condition at the end of the contract in October 2044, thirty years after its completion. Maintenance costs over this 30-year period are expected to total around $200 million. Unlike many similar public-private partnerships, the tunnels will not have a toll.

The originally scheduled June 2014 opening was delayed due to several mechanical problems, including leaky pipes, broken exhaust fans due to sudden vibrations, and failing bolts. The general contractor Bouygues was fined $115,000 for every day that the tunnel was not open, losing millions of dollars. The tunnel was officially opened to commercial and private traffic on August 3, 2014.

=== Criticism ===
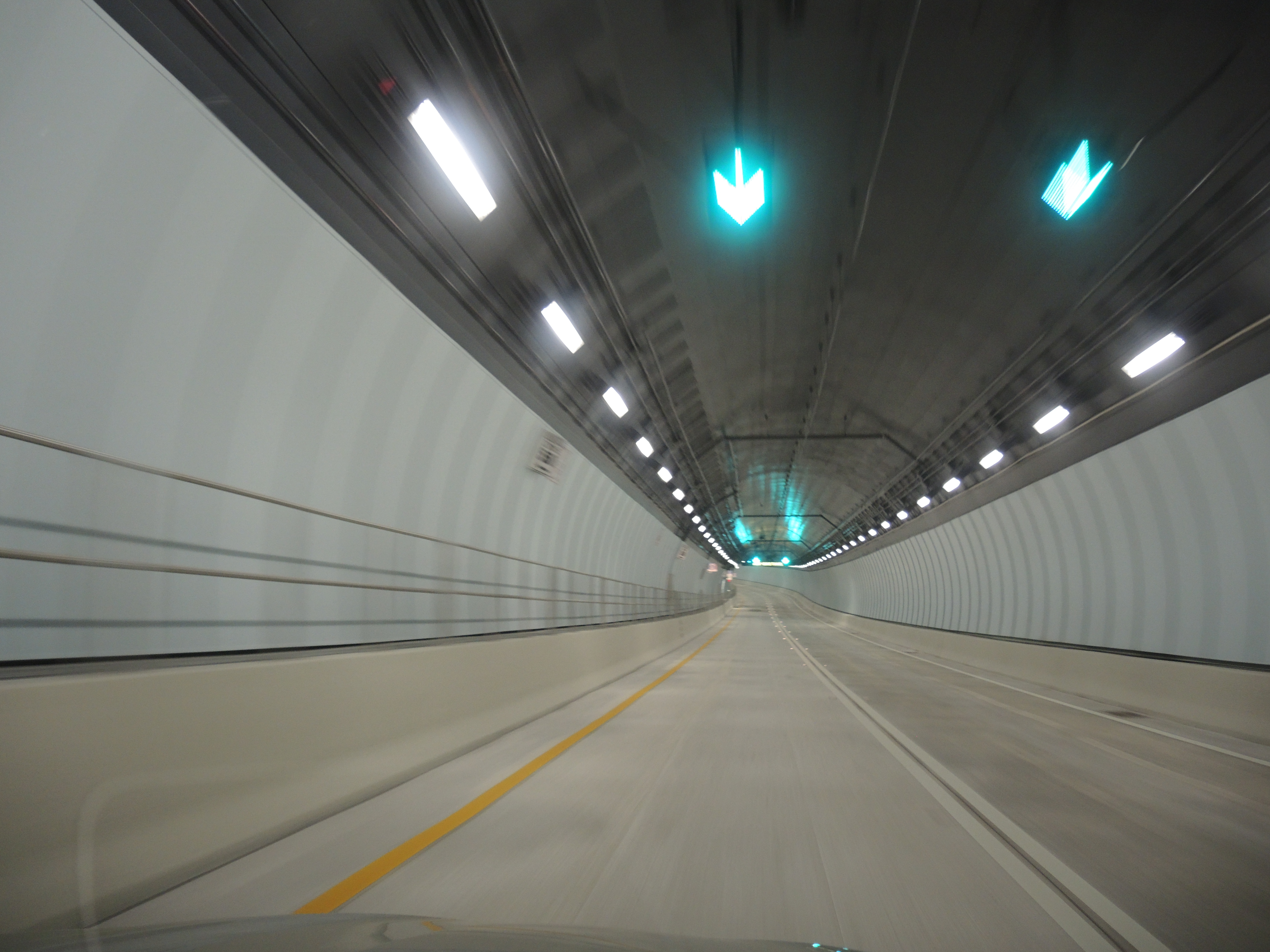
Center of the tunnel traveling from MacArthur Causeway to PortMiami

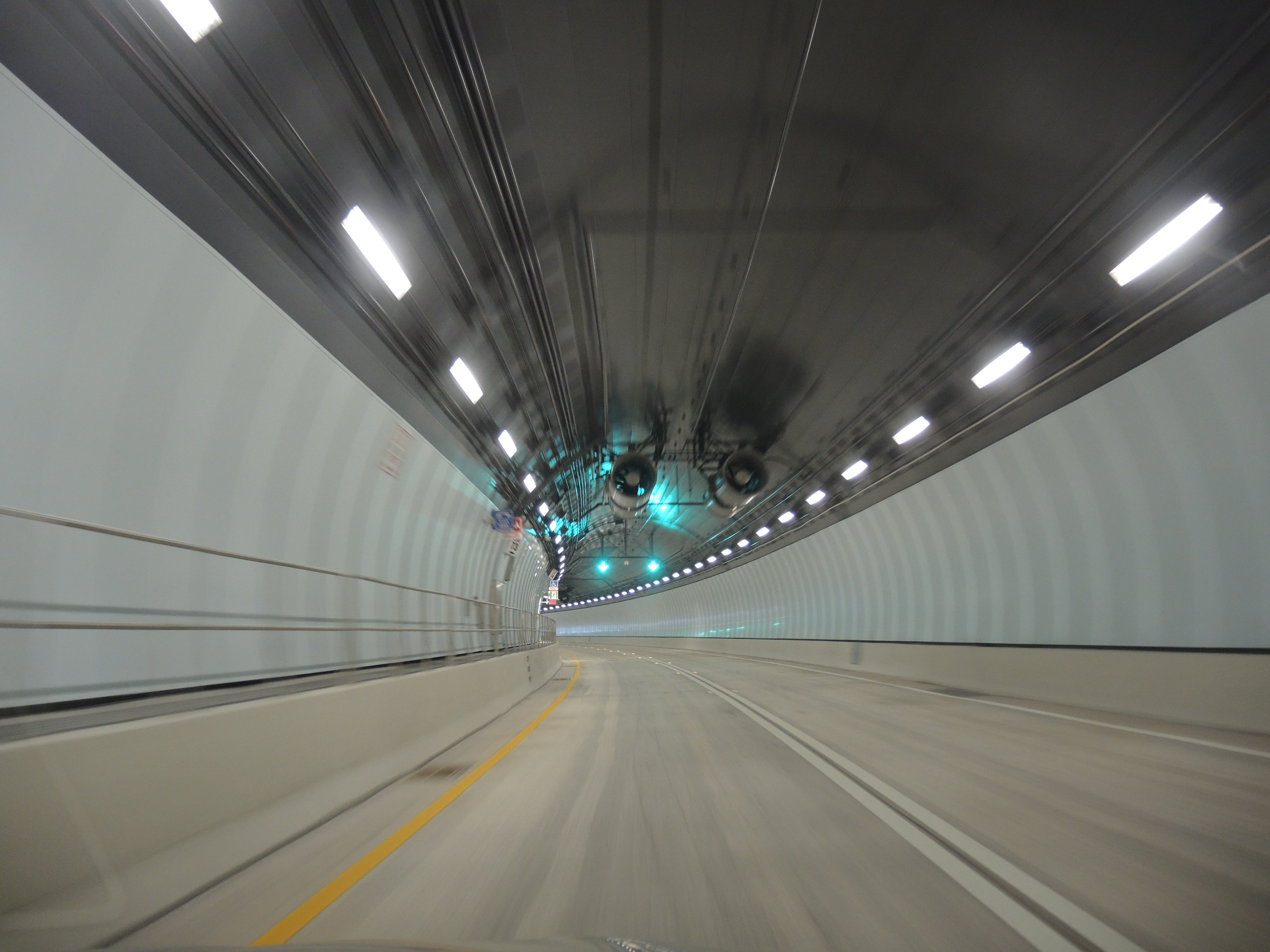
Traveling uphill towards the PortMiami portal from MacArthur Causeway

According to the Miami Herald the financing structure of the plan is notable for the amount of financial risk taken by the builders in return for the long term concession on the tunnel. Opposition to the project states that it is a waste of taxpayer money, and may become Miami's Big Dig, the nickname of a tunnel megaproject in Boston, which was a $4 billion project that ended up costing $22 billion in cost overruns. Many believe that the Port of Miami Tunnel Project will be likely to have similar cost overruns, even though the Secretary of the Florida Department of Transportation (FDOT) promised that the project would finish on time and without overruns. They also state that truck traffic is not a problem in Downtown, and that since 1991 car and truck traffic had reduced significantly.

Downtown business owners have referred to it as the "tunnel to no where," stating that no one will use it. In 1992, 32,000 vehicles entered the port daily, a number which later dropped to nearly half that, but had once again risen to around 19,000 by 2011. It has been regarded as a boondoggle project by those who oppose it, stating that the city can't afford it. In fact, the city did have difficulty providing its $50 million portion of the funding for the project. Some believe it may create traffic problems on the MacArthur Causeway; environmentalists worry about the potentially negative impact the construction could have on the Biscayne Bay. An ominous foreshadowing of cost overruns, Miami Access Tunnel requested money from a $150 million reserve fund in July 2011 for the unexpected need to grout the limestone beneath the surface so that the tunnel boring machine cuts more smoothly. This request alarmed new Miami-Dade Mayor Carlos A. Giménez when it was brought up at his first commissioners meeting as mayor on July 7.

The contractor stated that they will continue without the additional requested money if FDOT denies it, but it may end up as a court case as the contractor seeks it later. On July 19, the FDOT denied the request for more money to the contractor, stating that the geological issue cited was not as extensive as MAT claimed.

=== Cruise traffic ===
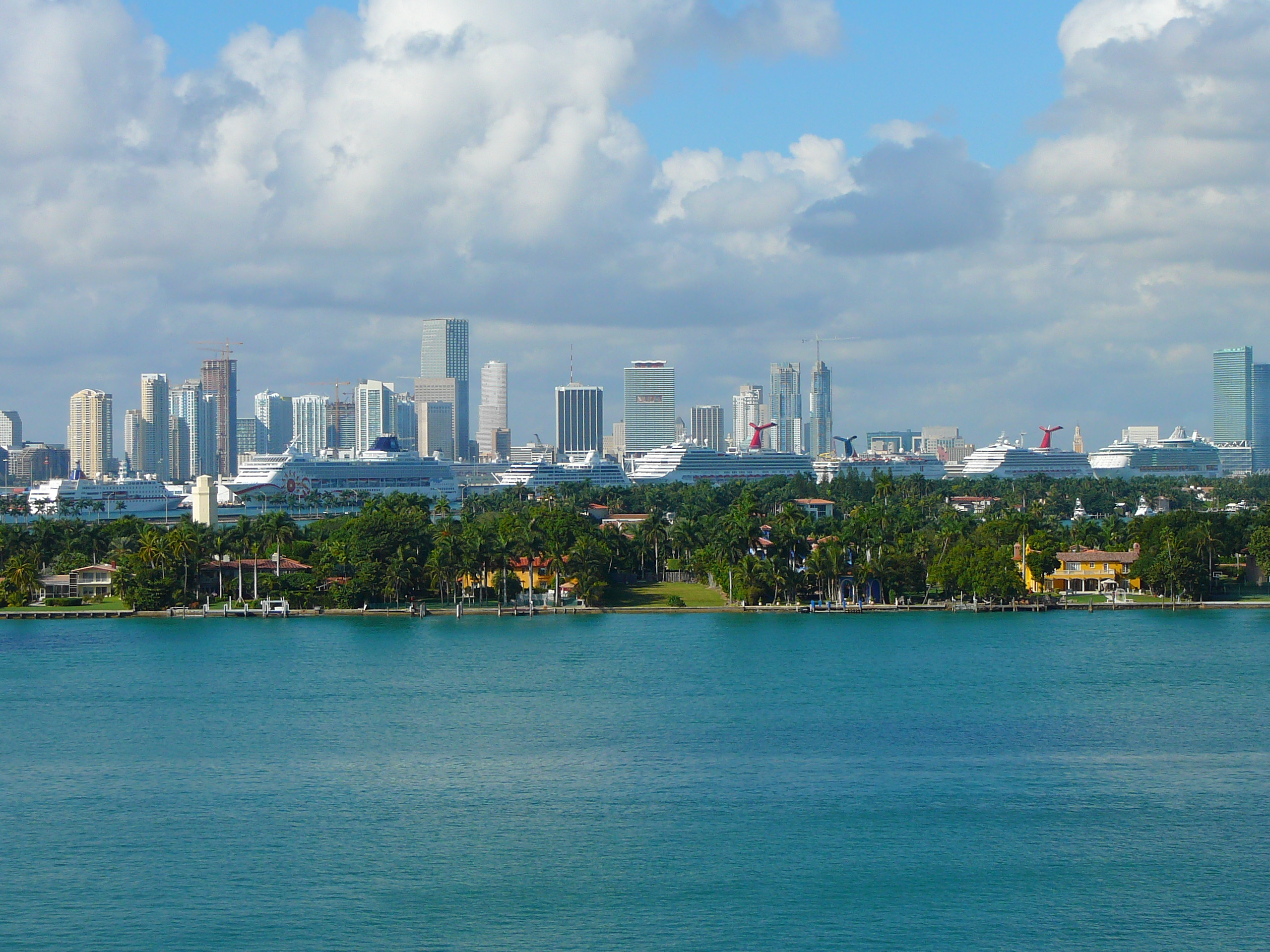
Seven cruise ships docked at the Port of Miami

In addition to the expected increase in cargo traffic, the Port of Miami stated that October 2010 was its busiest October ever for cruise vacations. The port had a record 346,513 cruise passengers that October, up 29% from October 2009. This follows a record year in cruise traffic, with 4.15 million cruise passengers in the 12 months that ended in September. This is partially due to the arrival of new cruise ships such as the Norwegian Epic, as well as the cruise line Costa Cruises. Despite this, the Port of Miami has recently been losing cruise and cargo traffic to nearby Port Everglades in Fort Lauderdale. In 2010, Royal Caribbean International, which is headquartered in Miami, chose Port Everglades as home for its new cruise ships, Oasis of the Seas and Allure of the Seas, at the time the largest cruise ships in the world.

As for cargo traffic, truckers state that despite the longer miles, they can make more trips per day at Port Everglades. Also, they blame the port itself for this, not the Downtown traffic. They state that at Port Everglades, they can make three to four runs a day, versus Port of Miami where "you're lucky if you get in two," states truck driver Alejandro Arrieta, due to waiting time at the port, which is often several hours. Port Everglades also has major redevelopment plans underway that includes its own deep dredging to a 50-foot (15 m) depth; they also claim to have surpassed the Port of Miami, which has long been known as the "Cruise Capital of the World" as well as the "Cargo Gateway to the Americas," in both cruise traffic and cargo tonnage handled.

=== Railroad access ===
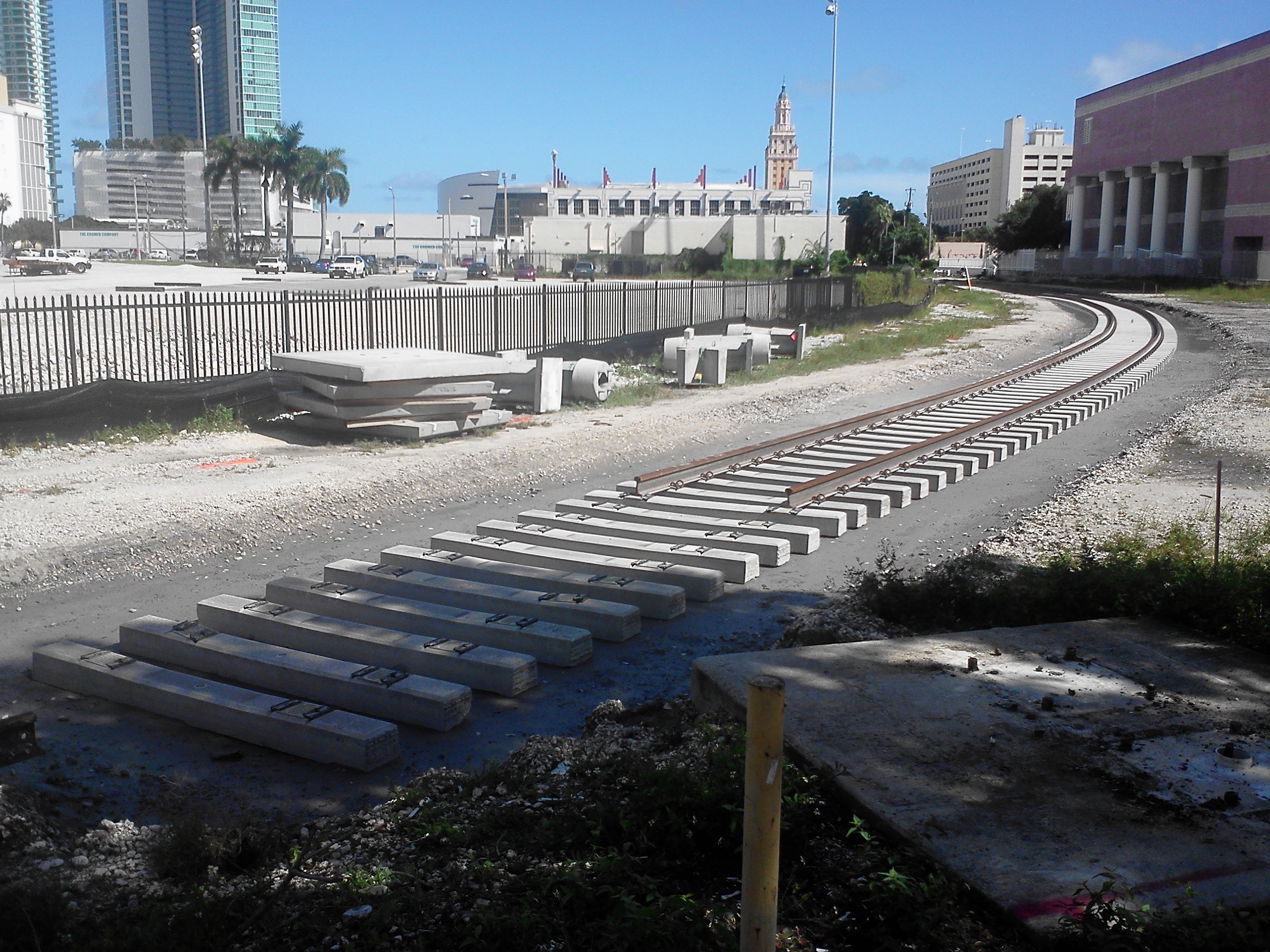
The rail line being redone in November 2011

The Port of Miami was awarded a federal grant as part of the Transportation Investment Generating Economic Recovery (TIGER) program to restore a connection between the Florida East Coast Railway's yard in Hialeah and the Port of Miami, directly connecting the port to rail networks across the United States, as well as re-establish the port's on-dock rail capability (loading and unloading directly between ships and trains). The railroad bridge connecting the Port of Miami to the mainland was damaged by Hurricane Wilma in 2005, at which time service was suspended, and the bridge remained closed for well over a decade. Rail service to the port was restored by 2014. The rail project is part of another element of increasing PortMiami's capacity; an inland intermodal center to be built near the airport known as Flagler Logistics Hub, which was planned to be built on 300 acres of land in Hialeah.

Opposition to the railroad line returning to service included that it would be as much of a problem to downtown traffic as the container trucks and that the noise would be a disturbance to nearby residents. As with before, however, trains are occasional and reserved for specialty loads, such as oversized loads and hazardous materials, which will be banned from the tunnel. It was also stated that the trains, which will be able to go up to 30 mph on the newly renovated line versus the old limit of 5 mph, will be able to cross Biscayne Boulevard in 90 seconds. The current plan is for the line to be strictly for intermodal services, with the project including a rail yard and station at the port, however, in the future a passenger station may be added.

=== Downtown congestion ===
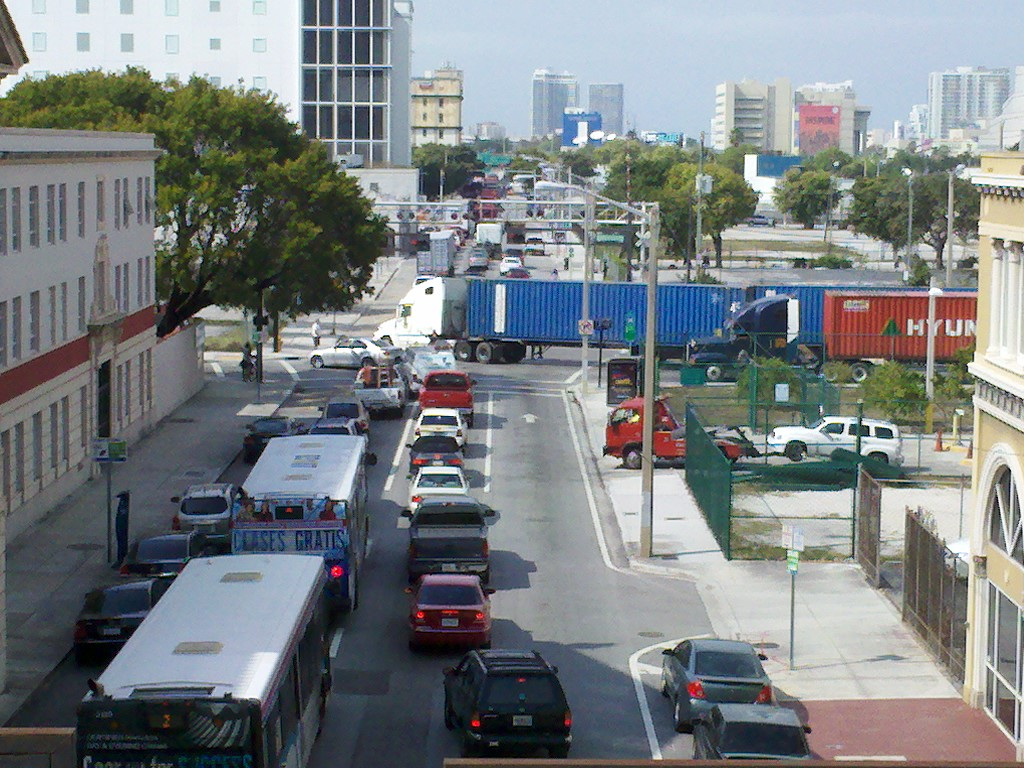
Container trucks leaving the port for Interstate 95 through downtown

Another major benefit of the tunnel will be the redirecting of the large number of vehicles (nearly 16,000 daily; 2009 estimate), many of them container trucks and cruise buses, that cross Biscayne Boulevard (US 1) at NW 5th Street (Port Boulevard), using level streets, such as Northeast 1st Avenue, which for years were the only way to access the port. Along with the capacity of the port, the amount of truck traffic could double after the completion of the numerous port projects. Additionally, the Port Boulevard entrance to the port is closed at night, concentrating all truck traffic during the day. This traffic creates congestion and presents a danger to pedestrians and bicyclists. Traffic is also considered to be a harm to Miami's northern central business district, reducing its ability to grow, including Miami's new Arts & Entertainment District, valued at over $12 billion.

The developers for a once planned project for the north side of downtown, known as Miami City Square, stated that the heavy truck traffic and congestion in that area was a "grave concern." The Omni Community Redevelopment Agency used a $50 million loan from Wachovia to donate towards financing the tunnel construction. Resorts World Miami by Genting Group and Miami World Center are two proposed major development planned for the area where congestion is a concern.

Additionally, the population of Downtown Miami nearly doubled from 2000 to 2010, and is expected to increase by several thousand more in the current decade, largely due to many new high rise condo developments in the downtown area adding thousands of housing units which will benefit from having the tunnel. Although traffic and port activity has declined since the early 1990s, losing some of it to the nearby Port Everglades, which overtook Port of Miami in 2007 as Florida's largest cargo port, the port is likely to see a large shift in the other direction after it becomes one of few deep water ports in the United States able to handle the New Panamax ships by 2016. Within the first month of opening, it was reported that congestion in the downtown area had eased.

It was estimated that 46% to 80% of the passenger vehicles, many of which are shuttle buses and taxis and make up nearly three quarters of the total port traffic will use the tunnel after it was completed.

=== Deep Dredge/Panama Canal expansion ===
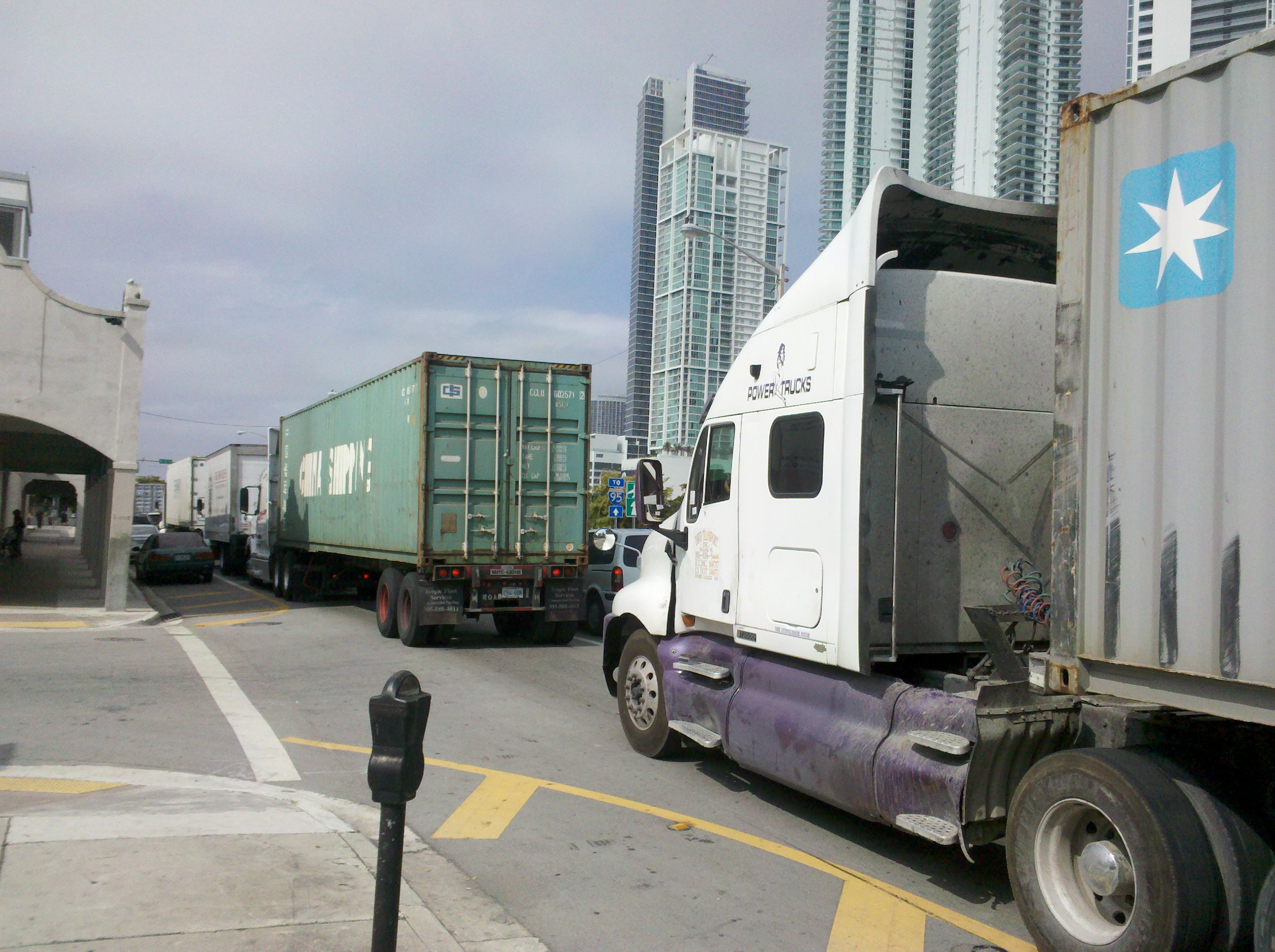
Container trucks from the Port of Miami traveling through downtown

The timing of the tunnel's construction and opening coincides with PortMiami Deep Dredge Project that will see the port dredged deeper to accommodate larger ships expected following the completion of the Panama Canal expansion, expected to be completed in 2016. This will allow much larger ships, known as New Panamax, which will have a capacity of more than double that of Panamax ships to traverse the canal. This is predicted to cause a major increase in the Port of Miami's cargo traffic, which would overwhelm the intersection of Port Boulevard and Biscayne Boulevard without the tunnel. In 2009, 870,000 trucks moved cargo in and out of the port; and port officials estimate that that number will increase to around 1.4 million when larger ships start arriving. In 2010, about 800,000 TEU's were moved through the port, and port director Bill Johnson said that with the right marketing to major shippers, that number should double by 2020. Currently, the largest cargo ships that dock at the port have a capacity of around 4,200 TEU's (Twenty-foot Equivalent Units). After the canal expansion and port dredging, ships as large as 7,500 to 8,500 TEU's will be able to dock there.

== Construction ==
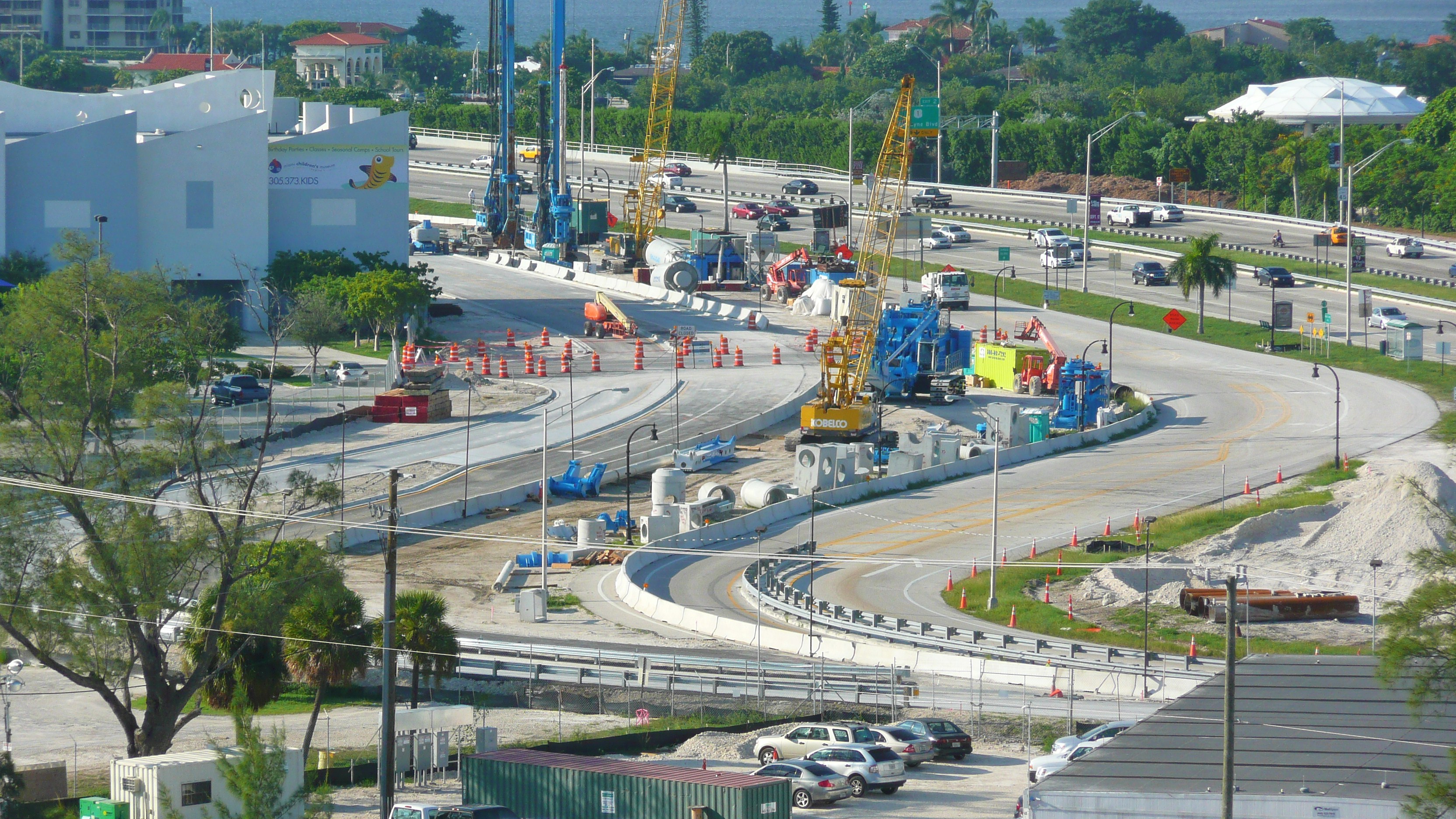
Preparing for construction on Watson Island (September 2010)

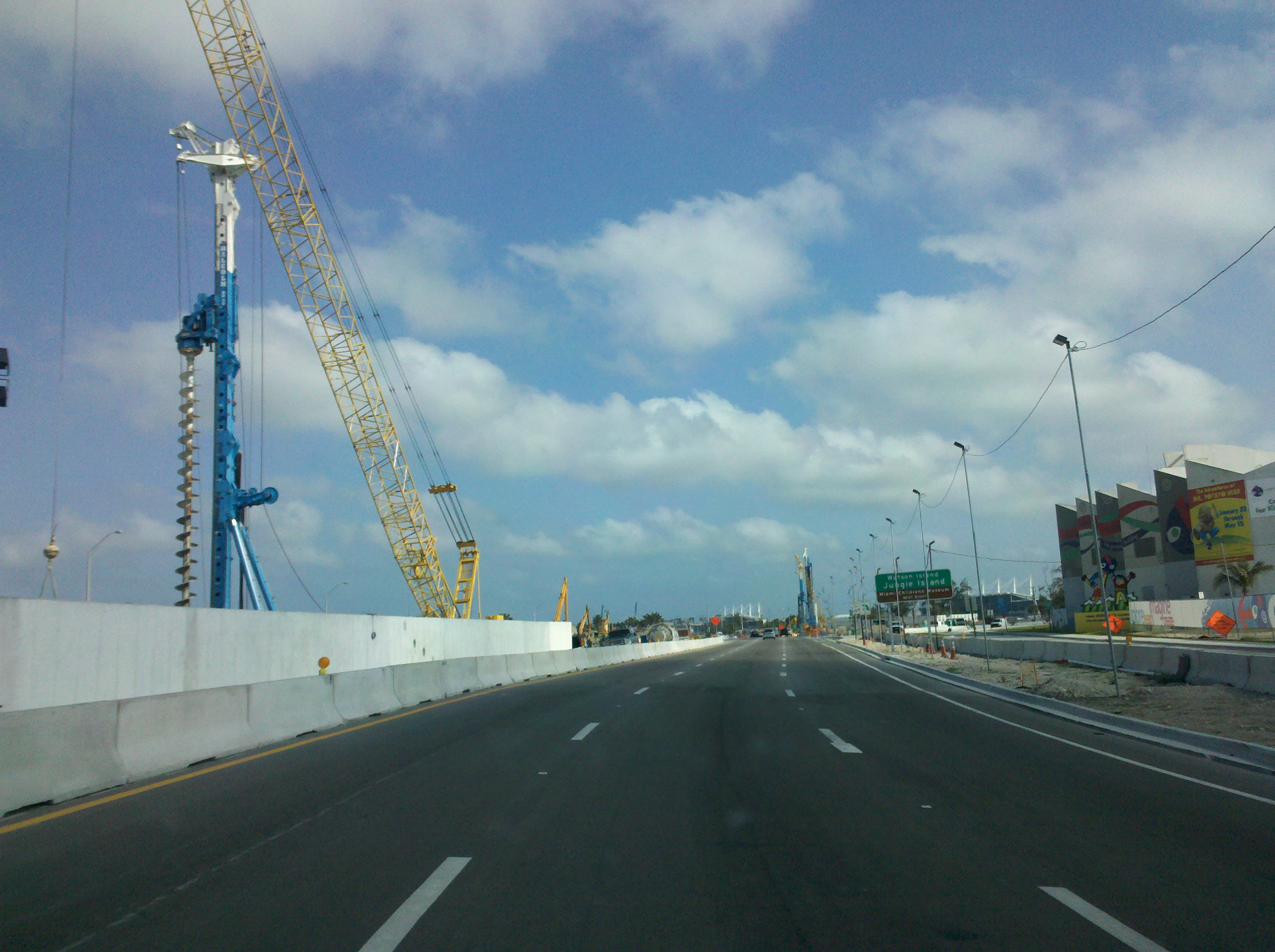
Construction on Watson Island (March 2011)

Work on the Port of Miami Tunnel project began on Watson Island and Dodge Island, including work on the MacArthur Causeway, in May 2010. Groundbreaking on the construction project was unannounced and considered secret, as the groundbreaking was scheduled for June 2010, but actually took place on May 24, 2010, without ceremony.

The tunnel boring machine was built in Germany and had to be re-assembled in Florida after arriving in crates on the 168 metres (551 ft) cargo ship Combi Dock 1 on Thursday, June 23, 2011, and being assembled in the median of the causeway where the construction is taking place. Both directions of the MacArthur Causeway have remained open during the assembly of the machine except for nighttime lane closures and delays on the westbound side.

The machine, which weighs more than 2,500 tons, was assembled in a 65-foot (20 m) deep pit known as the launching pad located in between two concrete walls in the median of the causeway, which only left a 42-foot (13 m) cutter visible from the road. According to NBC Miami, as of June 2011, 899 jobs had been created by the project, with over 70% being from the 305 area code (Miami-Dade County). The construction is projected to take 47 months, with the tunnel being finished in 2014. The French firm Bouygues Construction has been put in charge of operating the tunnel boring machine, which was nicknamed "Harriet" in July 2011 after a naming competition was sponsored by MAT and the FDOT, and carried out by the Girl Scout Council of Tropical Florida.

The tunnel boring machine was longer than a football field at 540 feet (160 m) long, and over 40 feet (12 m) in diameter. It was used to bore two side by side 43 feet (13 m) diameter tunnels, one for each direction, each 3,900 feet (1.1 km) long. The tunnel boring machine itself cost $45 million and was custom built for the Port of Miami Tunnel Project by the German firm Herrenknecht. No explosives are said to be used on the construction of the tunnel. Drilling of the tunnel itself commenced in mid-November 2011, with the drilling machine beginning work on the Watson Island tunnel entrance.

The first tunnel connecting Watson Island and the Port of Miami was completed in August 2012, and the second tunnel was completed on May 9, 2013, as "Harriet" emerged back on Watson Island, where digging had commenced in 2011. The roadway construction should finish for an opening on May 15, 2014. The MacArthur Causeway, which currently has three traffic lanes in each direction and a sidewalk on the eastbound side, will be widened to four 12-foot (3.7 m) wide traffic lanes with a ten-foot inner and outer shoulder, as well as a six-foot sidewalk.

The tunnel was officially opened to commercial and private traffic on August 3, 2014, after minor mechanical delays pushed back the originally scheduled June 2014 opening date. The general contractor Bouygues was fined $115,000 for every day that the tunnel was not open, losing millions of dollars.

=== Controversies ===
In March 2011, one of the sub contractors of Bouygues fell under criticism for the dumping of tunnel fill on sensitive wetlands on Virginia Key. They were supposed to be dumping the fill on Virginia Key on the degraded northwest side, but were found dumping it 80 to 100 yards (73.1 to 94.5 m) from the designated spot, where they damaged wetlands and killed about 40 mangrove trees with a piece of equipment that got stuck. The intention was that they would be allowed to put 55,000 cubic yards (42,050.5 m^{3}) of fill there provided that they use it to build a berm to block the view of Virginia Key's sewage water treatment plant. The fill that was dumped on Virginia Key was mainly rock and soil from road construction and site preparation on Watson Island and not from tunnel boring, which environmentalists object being put on Virginia Key as it may not be as clean. The north point of Virginia Key is one of the last remaining undeveloped areas near the Miami downtown area and has been recently restored as it was previously used as a dumping site for the infill from the Rickenbacker Causeway, Miami Marine Stadium, and Norris Cut.

One other potential infill site that was briefly suggested is an inlet located between Bicentennial Park and the American Airlines Arena on the mainland in downtown, where Miami-Dade County was conducting a study on the effects it would have. This proposal was quickly retracted after public outcry due to the fact that the currently closed off waterfront lot, known as "Parcel B," is slated to soon be a long anticipated public park. There has also been minor controversy over speculation that a yacht allegedly owned by Bouygues may have been bought with public money. A Bouygues spokesperson denied this claim. The owner of the seaplane base on Watson Island has accused the tunnel builders of trespassing for storing equipment on his property as well as for using the road that passes through his property. FDOT and city officials said the use of the land is permitted.

== See also ==
- Port of Miami Deep Dredge Project
- New Panamax
- Panama Canal expansion project
- Transportation in South Florida
