= PortMiami Deep Dredge Project =

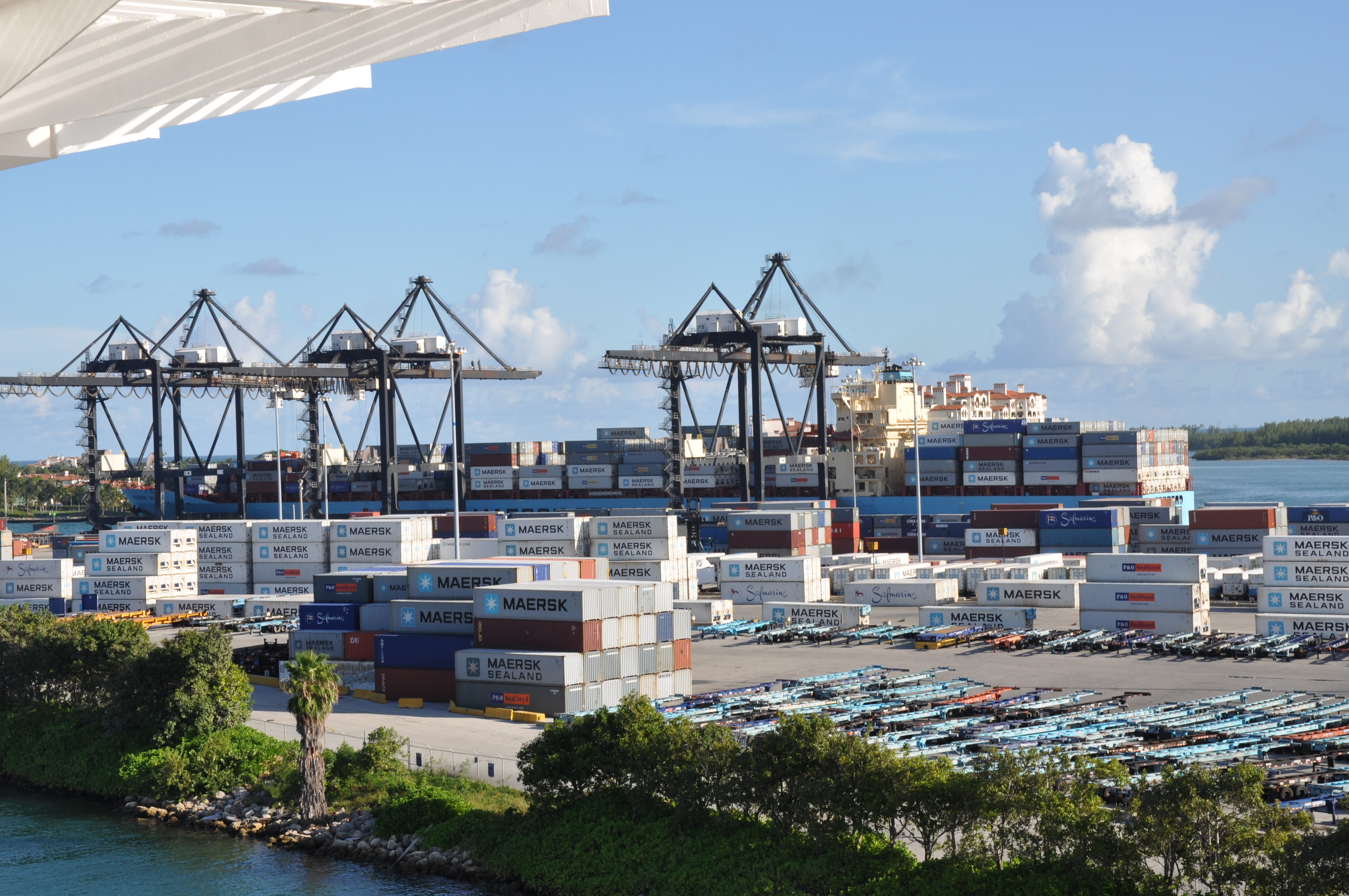
PortMiami is one of the busiest container ports in the US.

The PortMiami Deep Dredge Project was a project that expanded PortMiami by dredging the bay to allow new, larger cargo ships to enter the port. The project was related to the "New Panamax" project that was completed in 2016 that involved a major expansion of the Panama Canal. The port, which was 42 feet deep, was dredged to 50 feet in depth to allow the new Super Post Panamax megaships to enter. This project also coincided with the Port Miami Tunnel project, which was completed in 2014, that allows trucks to bypass Downtown Miami, resulting in twice the traffic capacity to the port. The ports of New York, Norfolk, and Baltimore have already undergone these projects. The Deep Dredge, along with port facility improvements such as the addition of two new large gantry cranes, made PortMiami capable of berthing even the next largest container vessels in the world, the Maersk Triple E Class, which has a draught of 48 feet (15 m) and is nearly 200 feet (61 m) wide, and was completed in 2015.

== Overview ==
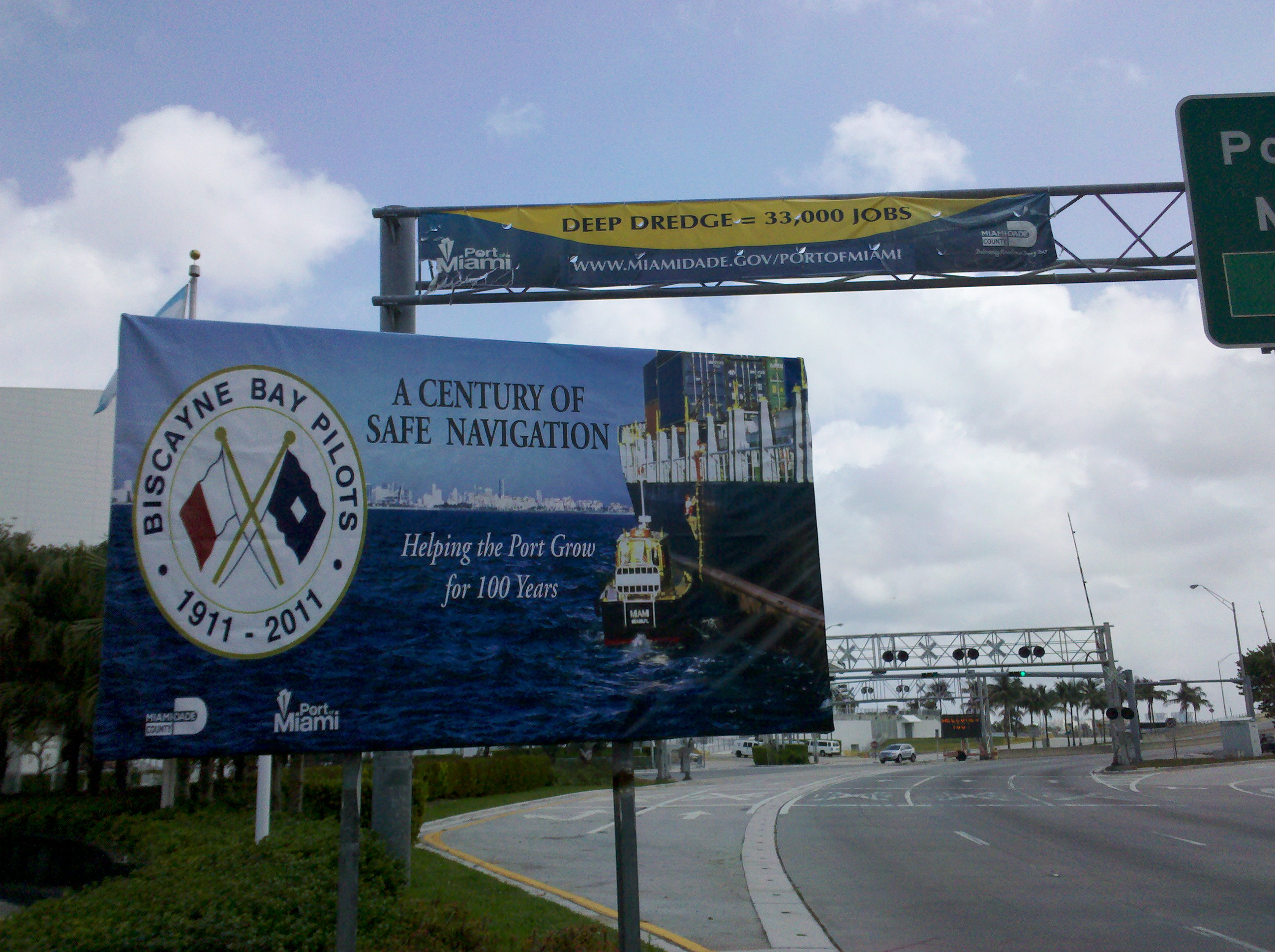
Deep Dredge banner at the PortMiami entrance

PortMiami is the closest US port to the Panama Canal, making it the most desired port for the new ships using the Panama Canal. Other ports competing for government funding in similar projects include Port Everglades in Fort Lauderdale, and ports in Tampa, Jacksonville, Savannah and Charleston. Aside from Miami being the only southeastern port that had given a nominal price for the project (180 million), the distance dredged was less than that of other ports, at 2.5 miles. As of December 2010, the port had already secured $17.5 million from the state and $120 million from the county for the project, which has been authorized by Congress. One notable issue is opposition to the use of state and federal earmarks, which the port had been seeking to use to get the funding. GOP leaders in Congress are attempting to ban earmarks; the amount of this federal money Bill Johnson is seeking to fund the Deep Dredge is 75 million. In Dec. 2010 then Governor elect Rick Scott, promised to reignite the state's economy and spur job growth, visited the port to learn about the project, but did not take a side. He said that "It appears to make all the sense in the world" but also said "I don't support any earmarks,". If Miami does not get the funding and the dredging is not done by 2014, South Florida may lose trade traffic to nearby ports such as Freeport, a foreign port in the Bahamas, which is already 50 feet. Four ports in Florida are being considered for expansion, Tampa, Miami, Jacksonville, and Port Everglades in Fort Lauderdale.

With the correct funding, PortMiami estimated that it would be capable of completing such a project by 2014, estimating that it will take 18 months to complete. It is also estimated that this project could double Miami's cargo business in the next 10 years as well as creating over 30,000 permanent jobs for Miami, which currently has a very high unemployment rate. In 2010 the port supported 176,000 jobs and $17 billion annually. This project had been advocated greatly by PortMiami Director Bill Johnson as well as Miami Mayor Tomas Regalado, and Miami-Dade Mayor Carlos Alvarez, as well as other elected officials. It is also supported by local media.

The World Trade Center Miami argued that the funding necessary to complete the project is only a small fraction of the $3 billion in federal aid rejected by New Jersey Governor Chris Christie to improve rail infrastructure between New York City and New Jersey.

== History ==
In March 2011, governor Rick Scott amended the $77 million loan needed to go ahead with the project. The funds were not included in the Obama Administration's new budget, they were instead taken out of a $7 billion Florida transportation fund. Rick Scott announced this at the same time he declined a $2.4 billion grant to fund the proposed Florida High Speed Rail system. In 2011, Obama cut the $75 million of funding that was supposed to pay for half the cost of the two mile dredging. Rick Scott flew to Panama in 2011 to witness the Panama Canal expansion. The completion date was July, 2015.
