= PortMiami =

Seaport in Miami-Dade County, Florida

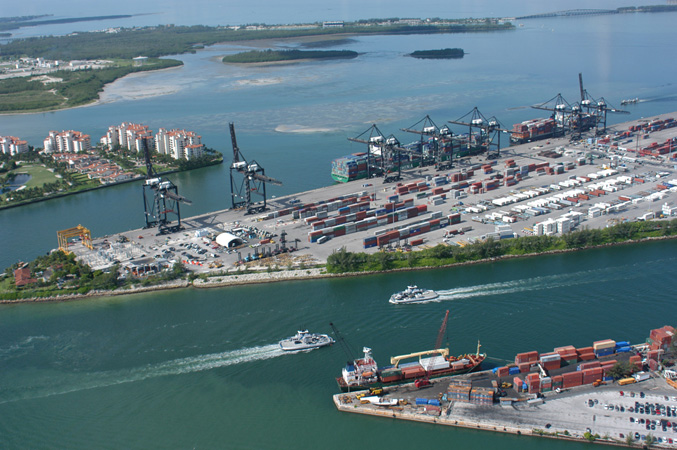
- A January 2008 aerial view of PortMiami in Miami, the world's largest passenger port and one of its busiest
- Interactive map of PortMiami
- Location within Florida Location within the United States

Location
- Country: United States
- Location: Miami, Florida
- Coordinates: 25°46′27″N 80°10′16″W
- UN/LOCODE: USMIA

Details
- Opened: October 4, 1964 (62 years ago)
- Type of Harbor: Natural/Artificial
- Draft depth: 43 feet (13 m)
- Employees: 176,000
- Port Director: Hydi Webb

Statistics
- Vessel arrivals: 2,489
- Annual cargo tonnage: 7.42 million
- Passenger traffic: 4.33 million
- Annual revenue: US$94.70 million
- Formerly: Port of Miami
- Website www.miamidade.gov/portmiami

The Port of Miami, styled as PortMiami and formally known as the Dante B. Fascell Port of Miami, is a major seaport located in Biscayne Bay at the mouth of the Miami River in Miami, Florida. It is the largest passenger port in the world and one of the largest cargo ports in the United States.

The port is located on Dodge, Lummus and Sam's Islands, which is the combination of three historic islands (Dodge, Lummus and Sam's Islands) that have since been combined into one. It is connected to Downtown Miami by Port Boulevard—a causeway over the Intracoastal Waterway—and to the neighboring Watson Island via the Port Miami Tunnel. It is named in honor of 19-term Florida Congressman Dante Fascell.

As of 2023, PortMiami accounts for approximately 334,500 jobs and has an annual economic revenue of $43 billion to the state of Florida.

== History ==
In the early 1900s, Government Cut was dredged along with a new channel to what now is known as Bicentennial Park in downtown Miami. This new access to the mainland created the Main Channel which greatly improved the shipping access to the new port. From these original dredging spoils which were disposed on the south side of the new Main Channel, new islands were inadvertently created which later became Dodge, Lummus and Sam's Island along with several other smaller islands.

PortMiami's improved shipping access and growth of the South Florida community led to an expansion of the port. On April 5, 1960, Resolution No. 4830, "Joint Resolution Providing for Construction of Modern Seaport Facilities at Dodge Island Site" was approved by the Dade County Board of Commissioners. On April 6, 1960, the City of Miami approved City Resolution No. 31837 to construct the new port. The new port on Dodge Island required expansion of the island by joining it together with the surrounding islands. After the seawalls, administrative buildings, and a vehicle and railroad bridge were completed, Port of Miami operations were moved to the new Dodge Island port. Additional fill material enlarged the connected Lummus and Sam's islands as well as the North, South and NOAO slips, creating a completely artificial island for PortMiami.

The port is officially named after Florida House of Representatives member Dante Fascell, who served for four decades from 1955 to 1993, and died in 1998.

In 1993, the first dredge of PortMiami occurred, deepening it to 43 feet (13 m). In 2006, a $40 million project to expand the South Harbor finished. In 2011, a project to reconnect PortMiami to the mainland via railroad began. In 2013, a dredging project began to deepen the harbors around PortMiami from 44 to 52 feet (13 to 16 m). In April 2019, the Miami-Dade Tourism and Ports Committee approved a deal for Royal Caribbean Cruises to build a new office and parking garage on Dodge Island.

== Today ==
=== Cruise ship operations ===
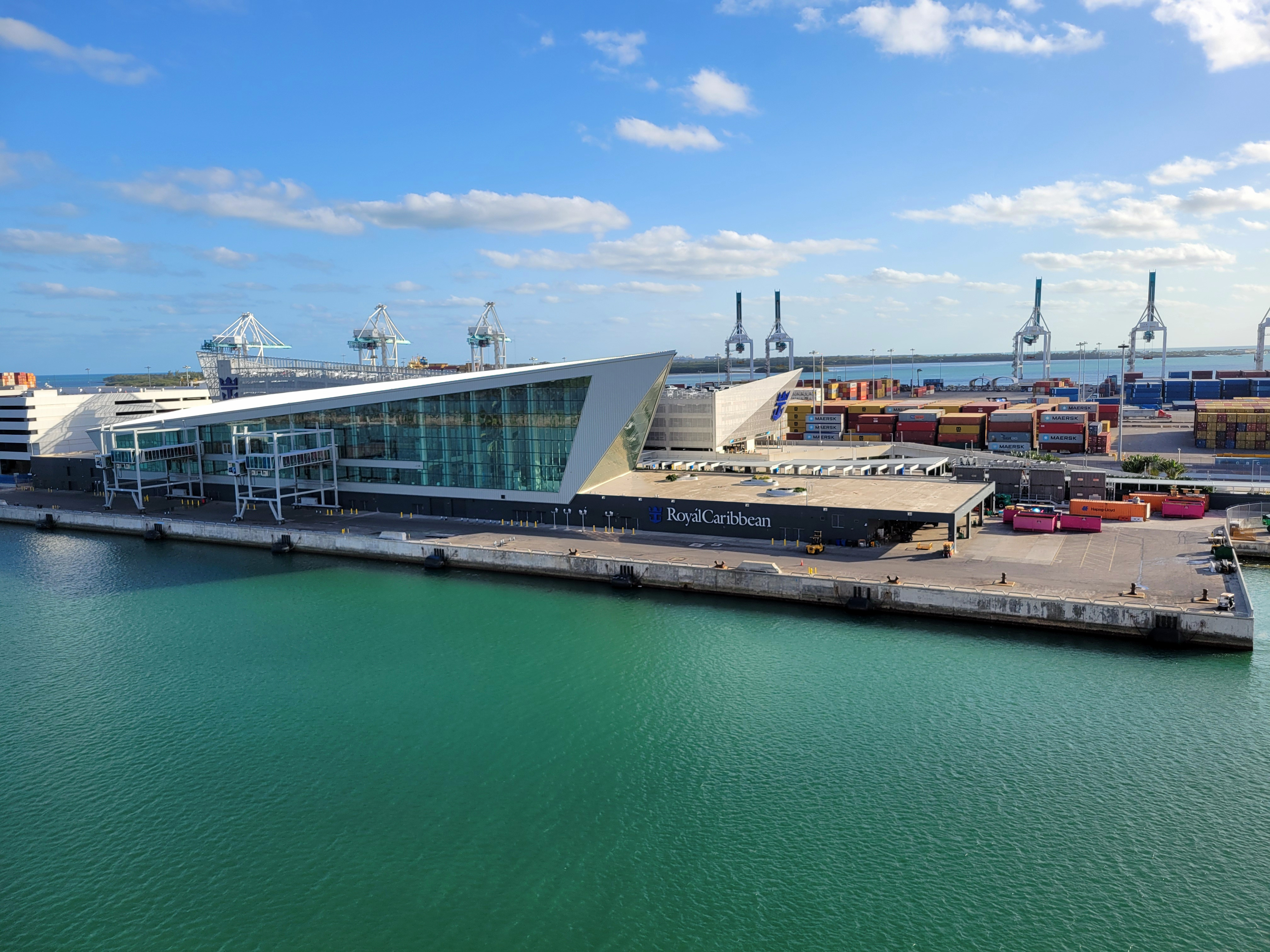
Royal caribbean Terminal A at PortMiami in March 2024

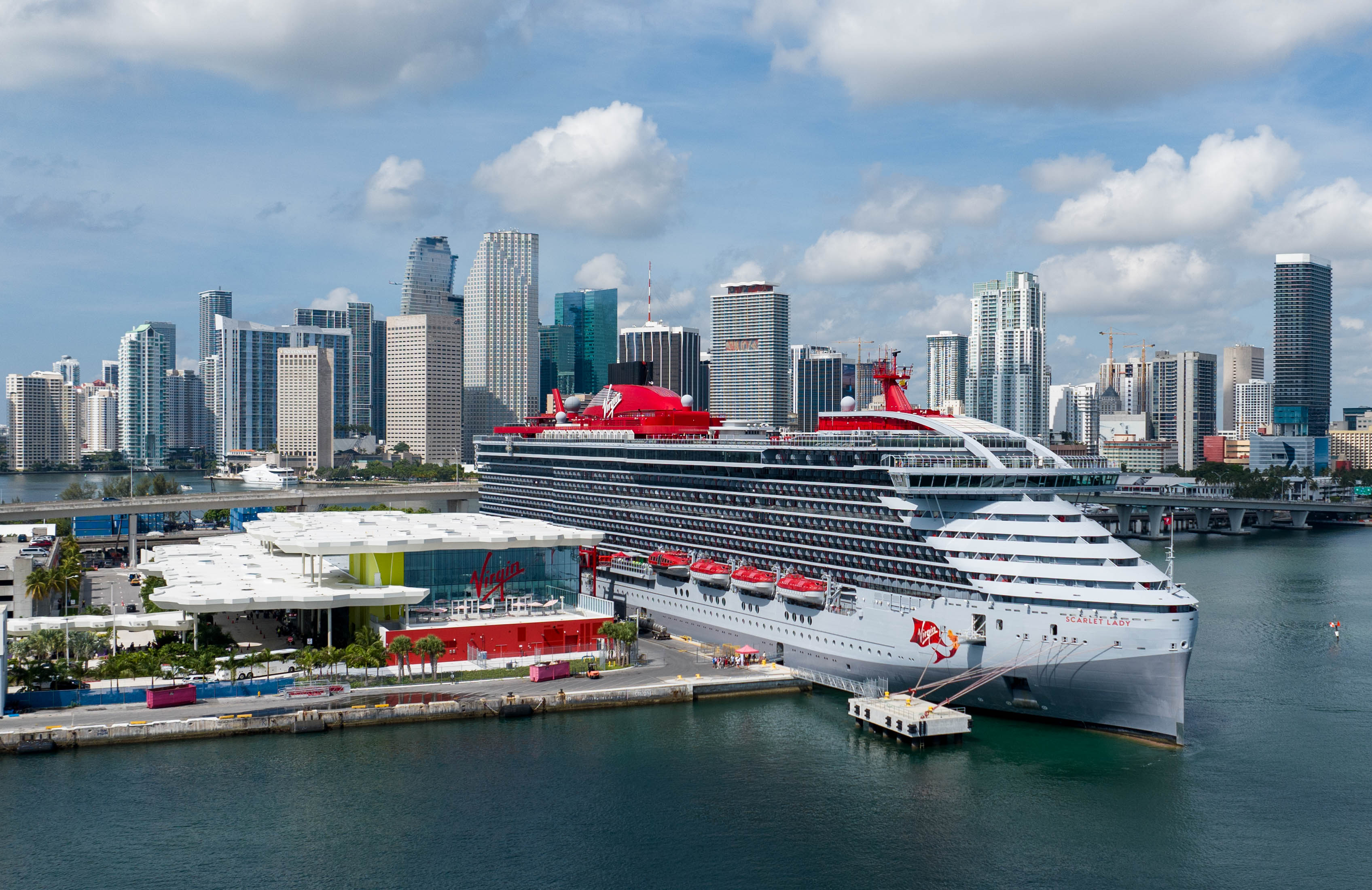
Virgin Voyages at Terminal V

PortMiami is the busiest cruise/passenger port in the world. It accommodates major cruise lines such as Carnival, Royal Caribbean, Norwegian, and MSC, among others, and also serves as the homeport of the largest cruise ship in the world by gross tonnage, Icon of the Seas. Over 7.2 million cruise passengers pass through the port each year (FY2023/2024).

As of January 2026, there are ten operating passenger terminal facilities at PortMiami: AA, A, B, C, D, E, F, G, J, and V. Of the nine, there are three facilities that are purpose-built for a specific company, while other companies share the other terminals. Other company-specific facilities are in their planning or construction stages.

==== Current passenger terminals ====
Terminal	Allocation
AA	This facility exclusively serves cruise lines that are part of Mediterranean Shipping Company.
A	This facility exclusively serves cruise lines that are part of Royal Caribbean Group, and handles the world's largest class of cruise ships, the Icon-class ships.
B	This facility exclusively serves cruise lines that are part of Norwegian Cruise Line Holdings.
C	This facility primarily serves cruise lines that are part of MSC Cruises.
D	This facility primarily serves cruise lines that are part of Carnival Corporation & plc.
E	This facility primarily serves cruise lines that are part of Carnival Corporation & plc.
F	This facility primarily serves Carnival Cruise Line.
G	This facility primarily serves cruise lines that are part of Royal Caribbean Group.
J	As PortMiami's boutique cruise terminal, it primarily serves smaller vessels and luxury cruise lines, such as Oceania Cruises and Regent Seven Seas Cruises.
V	This facility exclusively serves Virgin Voyages.

==== Terminals and projects ====
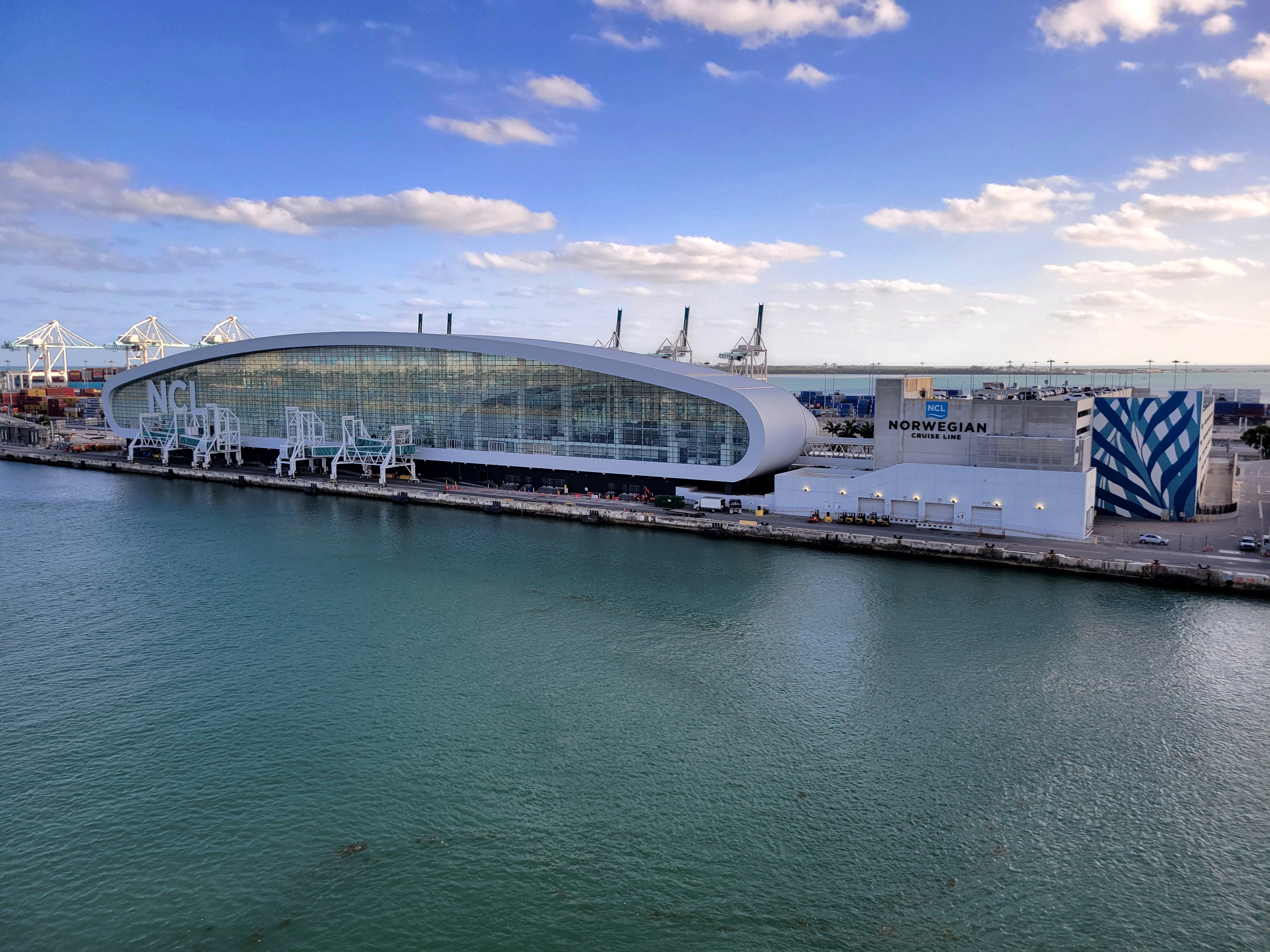
Norwegian Cruise Line (NCL) Terminal B at PortMiami in March 2024

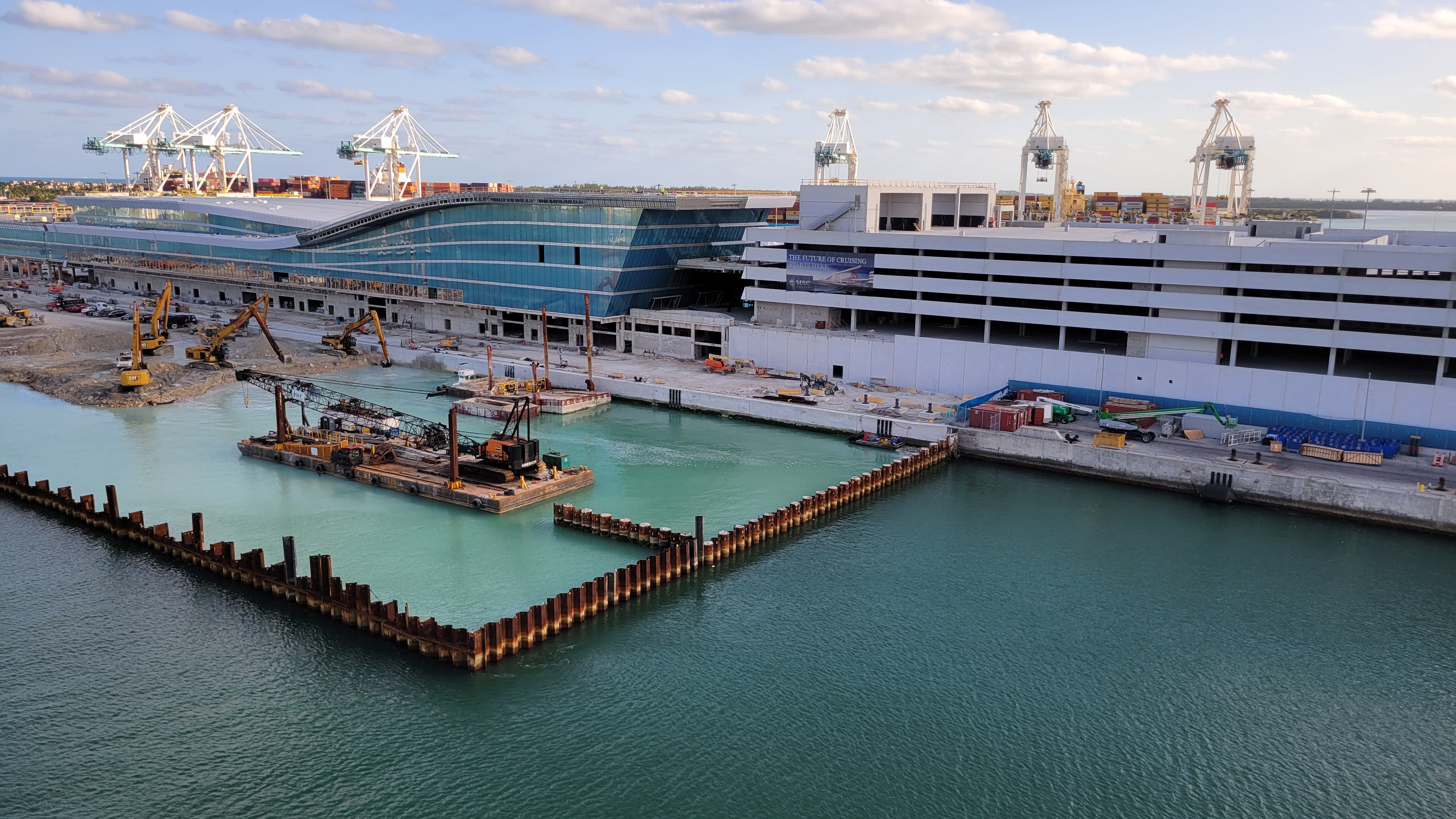
MSC-shared Terminal AA/AAA under construction in March 2024

On June 28, 2016, Royal Caribbean Group announced plans for a new 200,000-square-foot (19,000 m^{2}) facility that would redevelop "Terminal A" at PortMiami. It would be Royal Caribbean's homeport and be fully capable of serving larger Oasis-class ships. The terminal, dubbed the "Crown of Miami," was completed in November 2018.

On March 7, 2018, Norwegian Cruise Line Holdings announced plans for a new 166,000-square-foot (15,400 m^{2}) facility that would redevelop "Terminal B" at PortMiami. It would be fully capable of serving Norwegian's largest ships, the Breakaway Plus-class ships. Norwegian originally intended to open the terminal, dubbed the "Pearl of Miami," by fall 2019, but budgeting issues and the COVID-19 pandemic postponed its opening date until August 2021, when Terminal B officially serviced its first cruise ship.

On November 28, 2018, Virgin Voyages announced plans to build a new 100,000-square-foot (9,300 m^{2}) terminal located on the northwest side of PortMiami. On September 19, 2019, Virgin Voyages finalized the $150 million contract with Miami-Dade County to begin redeveloping the area currently occupied by "Terminal H", which would be renamed "Terminal V" upon completion. This facility effectively replaced "Terminal H". Prior to August 2019, "Terminal H" was primarily occupied by FRS Caribbean, which operated a ferry service between Miami and Bimini in The Bahamas. The new terminal is designed to be the homeport for Virgin Voyages' first two vessels, the Scarlet Lady and the Valiant Lady. "Terminal V" was completed in February 2022.

On September 19, 2019, Carnival Cruise Line announced that it had received approval from Miami-Dade County for an expansion of its company's facilities at PortMiami by renovating and expanding "Terminal F", making it the company's third passenger facility at the port and the company's largest terminal in North America, at 471,500 square feet (43,800 m^{2}). The terminal was completed on February 14, 2023 to coincide with the debut of Carnival's second Excellence-class vessel, Carnival Celebration, which is currently homeported in Miami. The terminal will be operated by Carnival under a 20-year lease.

In July 2018, MSC Cruises announced plans to build "Terminal AA/AAA" for its upcoming World-class cruise ships, a forthcoming class of cruise ship with an approximate gross tonnage of 215,800 tons. On September 19, 2019, MSC and Miami-Dade County finalized the contract to construct the new facility. The new $300 million building spans 16.7 acres (6.8 ha) and includes two berths capable of operating simultaneously, separately named as "AA" and "AAA," and is operated by MSC under a 62-year lease. Terminal AA was opened in 2025. In September 2018, it was announced that Disney Cruise Line had entered into an agreement with Miami-Dade County to plan for a brand-new terminal, "Terminal K", on the south side of PortMiami and east of Terminal J. The inauguration of the terminal was expected to coincide with Disney's expansion into Miami with two vessels homeported at the port in the mid-2020s. The construction of the terminal would have been dependent on improvements made to the port's infrastructure that could have enabled Disney's vessels to operate on the south side of the port. Dates for groundbreaking and completion were not announced at the time of announcement. However, in July 2020, in light of the COVID-19 pandemic and its economic repercussions, PortMiami issued a new proposal that accommodates MSC's difficulties in receiving financing for the project by amending the ground lease, while also granting the port additional time to prepare the site for the project prior to turning over the premises to MSC. Additionally, in an effort to reduce costs for its expansion projects, the port issued an accompanying resolution requiring the new MSC complex to share facilities with Disney Cruise Line, and will require Miami-Dade County to establish a new berthing rights agreement with Disney Cruise Line based on the proposal (Disney later announced that it would pursue a dedicated terminal at Port Everglades). Construction of "Terminal AA/AAA" began in March 2022, and MSC Cruises officially inaugurated the terminal as "Terminal AA" on April 5, 2025. In the future, a third birth will added to operate up to three cruise ships simultaneously.

Royal Caribbean Group also announced plans to redevelop "Terminal G" at PortMiami. A larger terminal would be constructed, and would be able to accommodate larger Oasis-class and Icon-class ships. Demolition of the old terminal began in July 2025. The new terminal is expected to be completed in winter of 2027.

=== Container ship operations ===
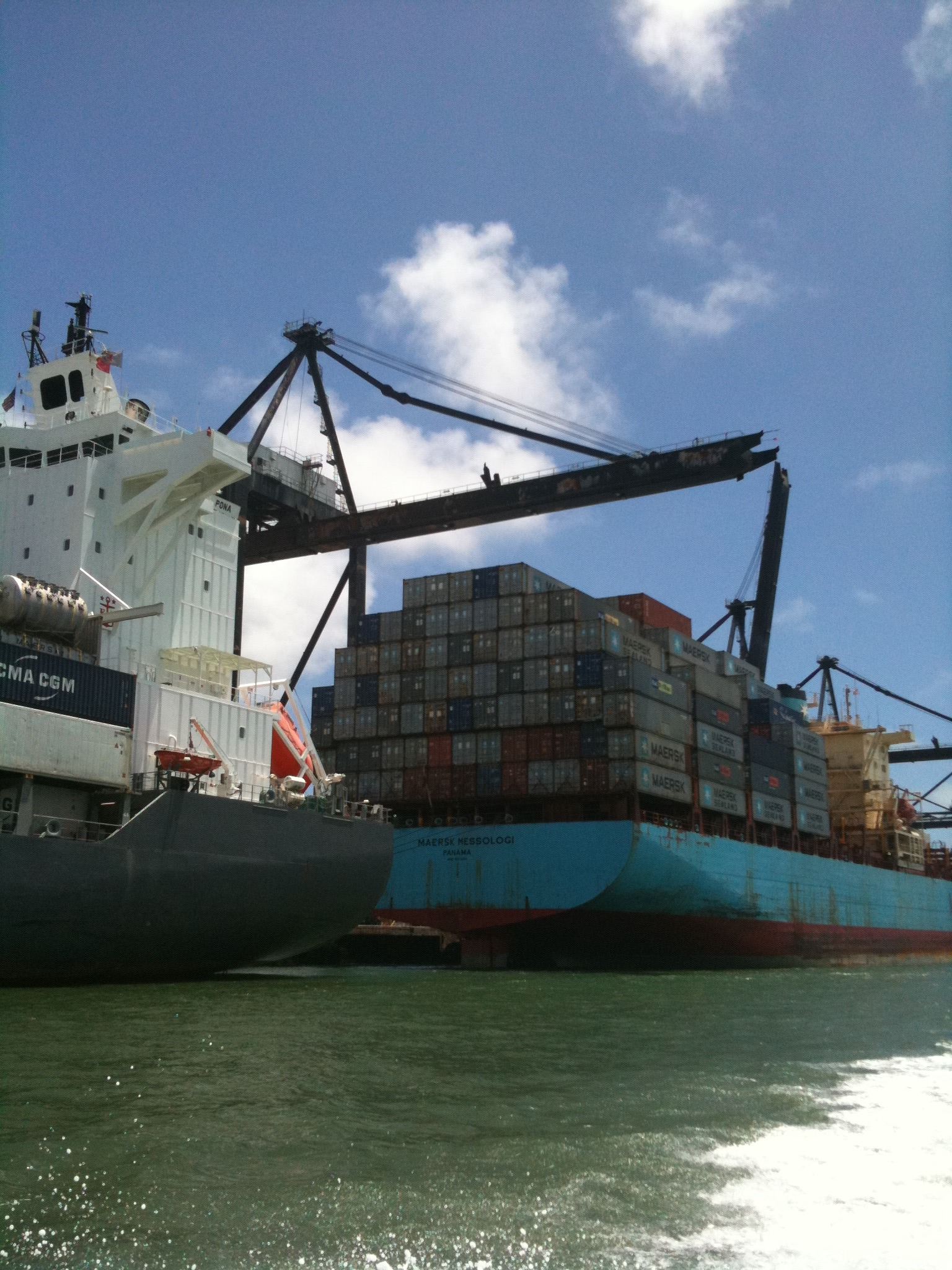
PortMiami, the world's largest passenger port and one of its busiest container ports

As the "Cargo Gateway of the Americas," the port primarily handles containerized cargo with small amounts of breakbulk, vehicles and industrial equipment. It is the largest container port in the state of Florida and ninth in the United States.

Over 9.6 million tons of cargo and over 1 million twenty-foot equivalent units (TEU) (FY 2018/2019) of intermodal container traffic move through the seaport per year. The economic impact from cargo operations at PortMiami to Florida amounts to $35 billion.

As of 2021, nearly 1,000 cargo ships docked at the port. In terms of TEU, China is PortMiami's largest trade partner, while Honduras is ranked first in terms of trade value. Computers represent the port's most valuable export, while insulated wire and cable are considered the most valuable import.

=== Design and infrastructure ===
The port currently operates eight passenger terminals, six gantry crane wharves, seven Ro-Ro (Roll-on-Roll-off) docks, four refrigerated yards for containers, break bulk cargo warehouses and nine gantry container handling cranes. In addition, the port tenants operate the cruise and cargo terminals which includes their cargo handling and support equipment.

To retain the port's competitive rank as a world-class port, in 1997 the port undertook a redevelopment program of over $250 million which is well underway to accommodate the changing demands of cruise vessel operators, passengers, shippers and carriers. To further resolve accessibility, the Port Miami Tunnel was constructed in 2010 and completed in 2014, providing direct vehicle access from the port to the interstate highway system via State Road 836, thereby bypassing congestion in downtown Miami.

As part of the massive PortMiami redevelopment program, new ultramodern cruise terminals, roadways and parking garages have been constructed. Additionally, a new gantry crane dock and container storage yards have been constructed along with the electrification of the gantry crane docks to include the conversion of several cranes has been completed. In addition, the Port acquired two state-of-the-art super post-panamax gantry cranes which are amongst the largest in the world; able to load and unload 22 container (8 foot wide each), or nearly 200 foot, wide mega container ships. This, along with the planned PortMiami Deep Dredge Project, would make it possible for PortMiami to facilitate even the future largest containerships in the world, the Maersk Triple E Class. The new and restructured roadway system with new lighting, landscaping and signage greets visitors to the 'Cruise Capital of the World and Cargo Gateway of the Americas'. The roadways will change again with the completion of the PortMiami Tunnel. And to enhance cargo port accessibility, the newly constructed Security Gates opened at the end of 2006 to increase the processing rate for container trucks and help eliminate the daily traffic backups.

== Tunnel and Deep Dredge ==
Four major projects directly and indirectly related to PortMiami are expected to increase both the capacity and efficiency of the port: the expansion of the Panama Canal, the PortMiami Deep Dredge Project, the Port Miami Tunnel, and the restoration and upgrade of the bridge and rail line connecting PortMiami to the mainland.

On May 24, 2010, construction began on the Port Miami Tunnel, a $1 billion project providing a much-needed direct connection from the port to I-395. Prior to the tunnel's completion, the only way to enter and exit the port was via surface streets through downtown Miami. Construction on the tunnel finished in 2014.

Another major development for the PortMiami was the PortMiami Deep Dredge Project, enabling Super Post Panamax Megaships to enter the United States after the completion of the Panama Canal expansion in 2014. The ports of Norfolk, New York and Baltimore have also deepened their ports to the required 50 feet. It is estimated that this project could double Miami's cargo business in the next 10 years as well as creating over 30,000 permanent jobs for Miami, which currently has a very high unemployment rate.

There were plans to build a soccer-specific stadium at PortMiami. The plans were proposed by a group, led by David Beckham, seeking to bring a Major League Soccer team to Miami. The group has stated that they would fund such a stadium privately, but there has been opposition on multiple grounds, including the added traffic to downtown Miami and the impact on wildlife. The stadium has now been relocated to a new site.

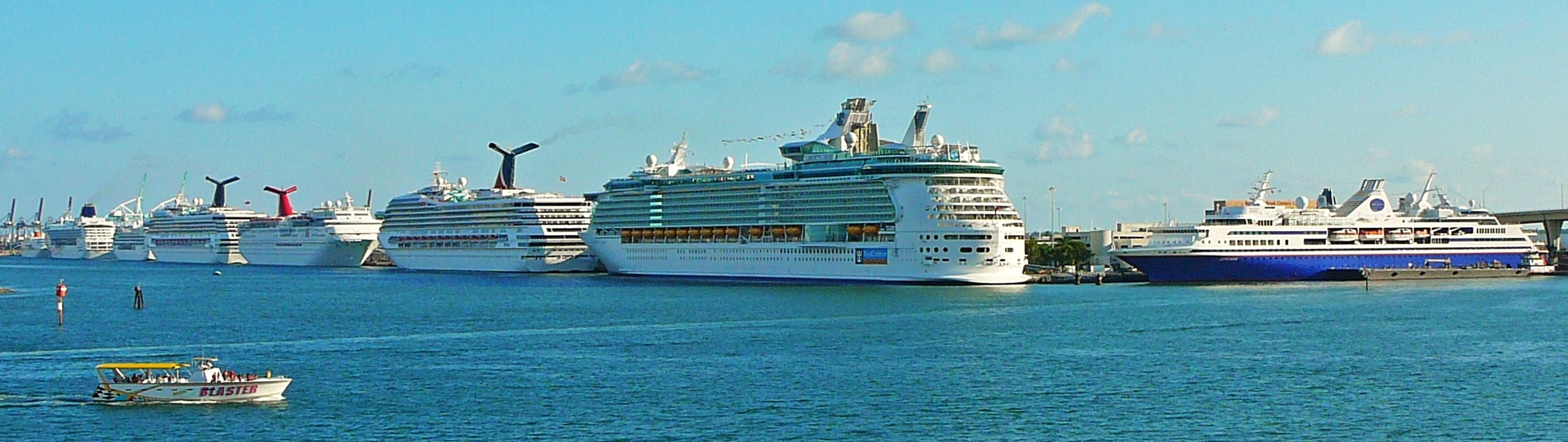
PortMiami is the world's busiest cruise ship port, and is headquarters to many of the world's largest cruise companies. From left to right: Hapag-Lloyd Europa, Norwegian Sky, Oceania Nautica, Carnival Valor, Carnival Imagination, Carnival Liberty, Liberty of the Seas, and MV Explorer

== Railroad access ==
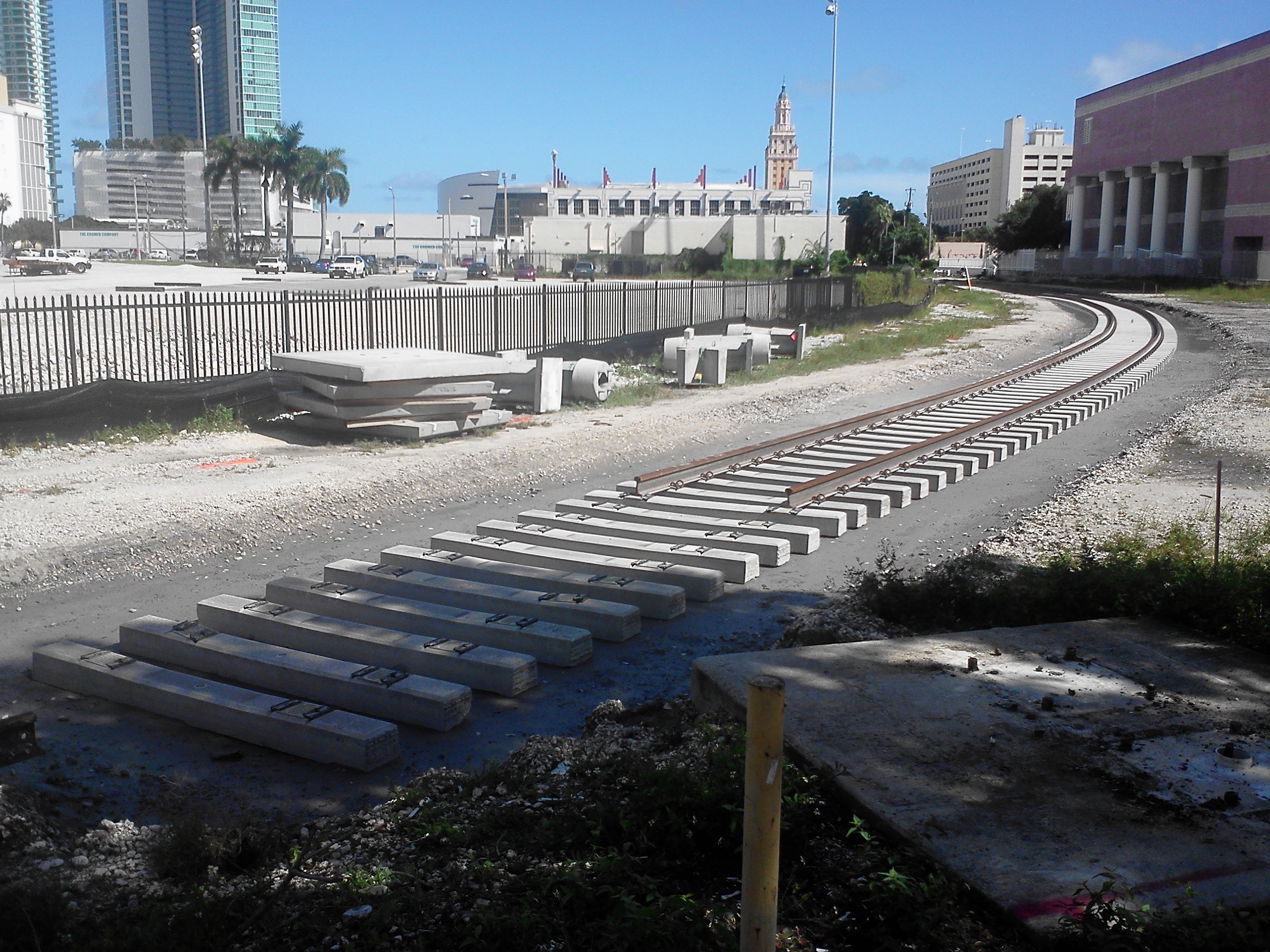
The rail line being renovated, November 2011

In 2011, PortMiami was awarded a federal grant, as part of the Transportation Investment Generating Economic Recovery (TIGER) program, to restore a connection between the Florida East Coast Railway's yard in Hialeah and PortMiami, directly connecting the port to rail networks across the United States, as well as re-establishing the port's on-dock rail capability (loading and unloading directly between ships and trains). The railroad bridge connecting the port to the mainland was damaged by Hurricane Wilma in 2005, at which time service was suspended. The project was scheduled to be finished in time for the completion of the other projects in 2014. The rail project is related to another scheme to increase PortMiami's capacity; an inland intermodal center, known as Flagler Logistics Hub, to be built near the airport on 300 acres of land in Hialeah.

There was some opposition to the railroad line being returned to service, with claims that it would be as much of a problem to downtown traffic as container trucks, and that the noise would be a disturbance to nearby residents. However, trains are occasional and will be reserved for specialty freight, such as oversized loads and hazardous materials, which will be banned from the tunnel. As well, trains will be able to travel at up to 30 mph (50 km/h) on the newly renovated line, in contrast to the old limit of 5 mph (8 km/h), and so will be able to cross Biscayne Boulevard in 90 seconds. The current plan is for the line to be strictly for intermodal services, with the project including a rail yard and station at the port. However, a passenger station may be added in the future.

The cost of restoring the rail link between the port and the Hialeah Railyard was estimated at $46.9 million, $28 million of which was applied for through a federal grant in 2010. Later that year, a grant of $22 million was awarded for this project, as well as to build an on site intermodal rail yard at the port. During the 2000s the percent of Florida East Coast Railway's business has increased from around 60% to around 80% intermodal freight. However, this was partially due to a decrease in other freight traffic caused by the 2008 recession, which reduced the number of trains, many carrying rock aggregate used in construction, from about 20 to 14 per day.

There was a plan to start a passenger service connecting Jacksonville to Miami using the FECR mainline, with stops at popular tourist attractions. The State of Florida had provided $116 million of the $268 million needed to fund that project. The remaining funding for the passenger line is expected to come from a federal grant, and the remaining funding to fix the local freight line from the Port to Hialeah is supposed to come from the Florida East Coast Railway (FEC) at $10.9 million, the Florida Department of Transportation (FDOT) at $10.9 million, with the PortMiami itself providing $4.8 million. (The passenger service never began; however, the plan was effectively replaced by Brightline.) In April 2011, Atlas Railroad Construction was chosen to rebuild the line, which was to be completed by 2012 and was estimated to remove 5% of the road traffic from the port. On July 15, 2011, a ground-breaking ceremony marking the beginning of the rail link project, which is expected to create over 800 jobs and generate $33.38 million in wages, was performed by US Senator Bill Nelson, Secretary of Transportation Ray LaHood, Miami-Dade Mayor Carlos A. Gimenez, and Miami city mayor Tomás Regalado. The project has been named the PortMiami Intermodal and Rail Reconnection Project.

== See also ==
- Florida tourism industry
- Transportation in South Florida
- United States container ports
- Port Canaveral and Port Everglades previously surpassed PortMiami cruise traffic
