= Watson Island =

Coordinates: 25°47′05.0″N 080°10′33.0″W

- Neighborhood of Miami
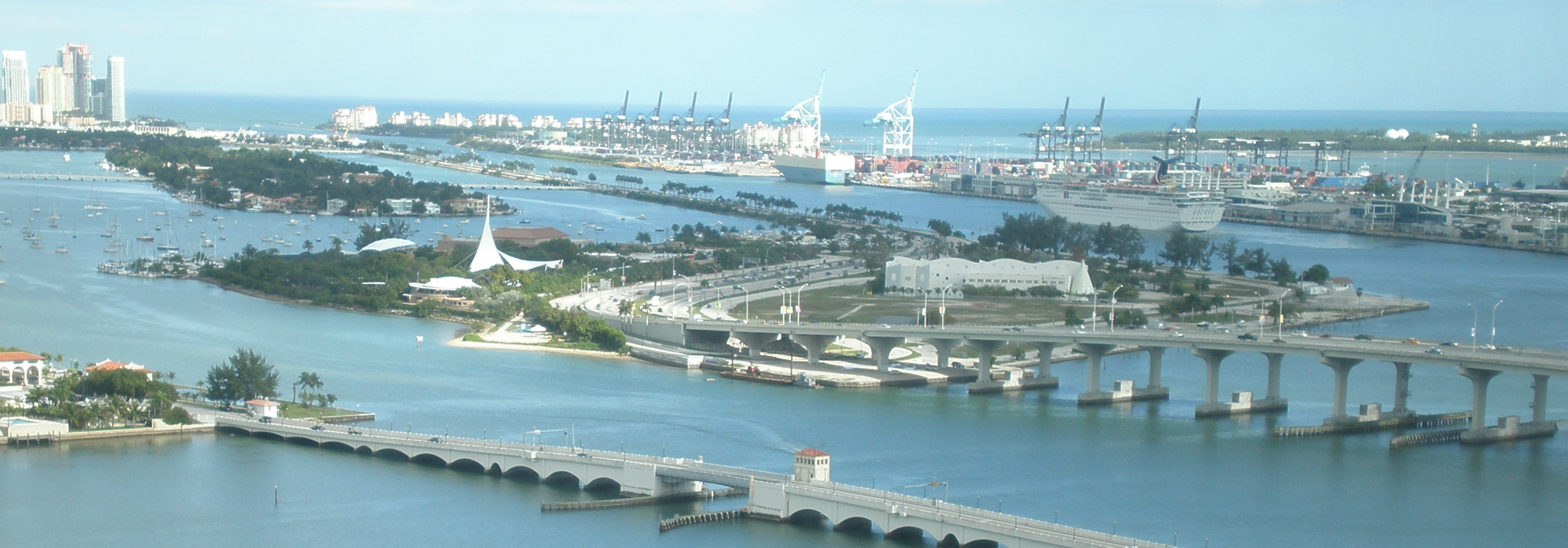
- Watson Island and the MacArthur Causeway, with the Venetian Causeway in the foreground

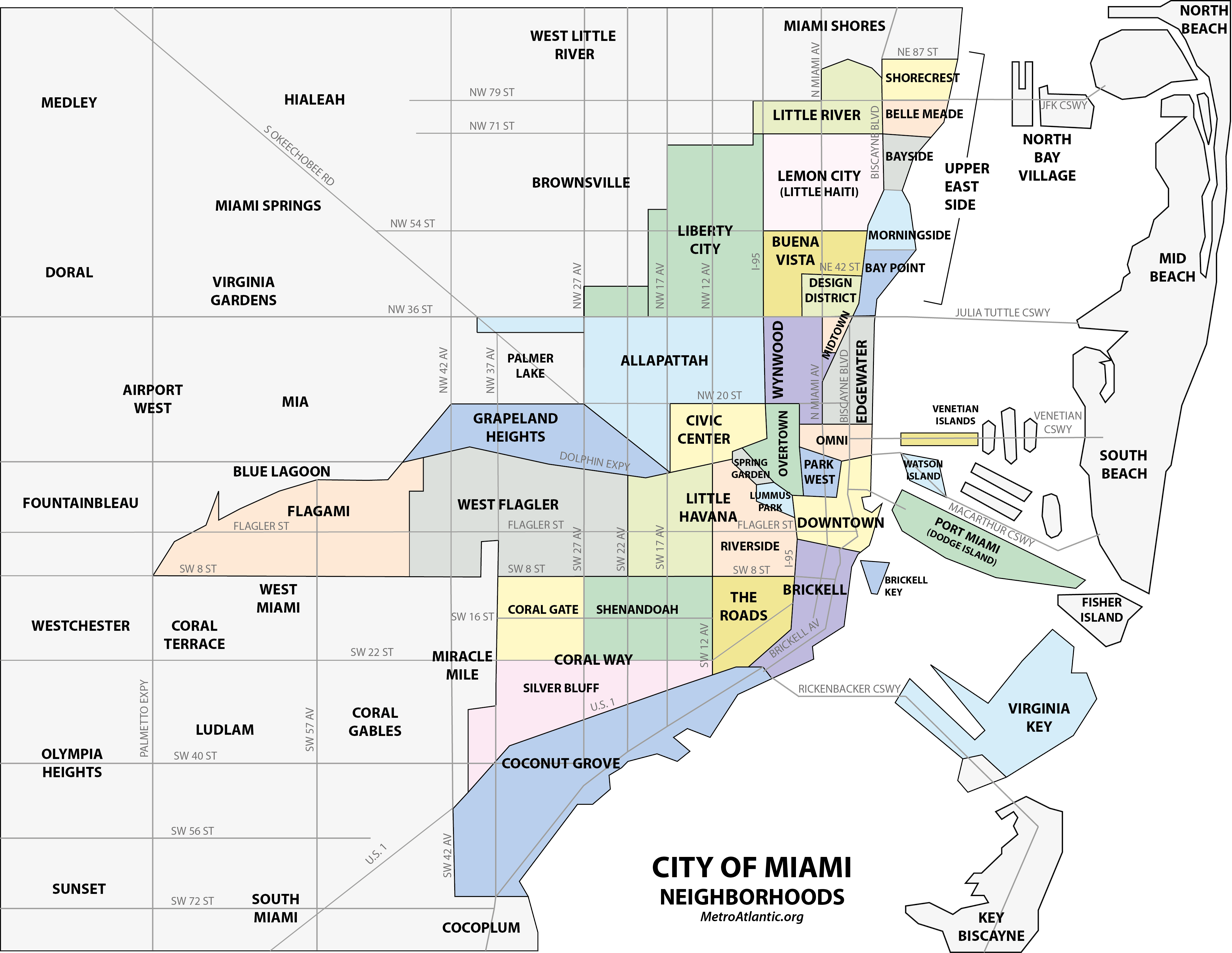
- Map of Miami neighborhoods. Watson Island is the smallest light-blue area, just above the western end of the elongated green Port of Miami area.
- Country: United States
- State: Florida
- County: Miami-Dade County
- City: Miami
- Established: 1926

Area
  - Total: 0.280 sq mi (0.73 km^{2})
- Time zone: UTC-05 (EST)
- ZIP Code: 33132
- Area codes: 305, 786

Watson Island is a neighborhood and man-made island in Biscayne Bay, in Miami, Florida. It is located Immediately east of the Central Business District and Arts & Entertainment District neighborhoods of downtown Miami and is connected to the mainland and South Beach, Miami Beach by the MacArthur Causeway.

== History ==
The island was deeded to the city in 1919 with the restriction that it only be used for public or municipal purposes. The city gave it to the state and the state deeded it back to the city with similar restrictions - both in the 1940s. In 1979 the city attempted to circumvent this prohibition by claiming that the underwater land surrounding the island is a preserve and Watson Island need not be protected as per the deed, as a park, or for public ownership and use.

The island had a name change from Causeway Island to Watson Island, named for John W. Watson Sr., who was Mayor of Miami 1912-1915 and 1917–1919. In 1932 Watson Island was considered for the site of Miami's Pan-American Exposition, a World's Fair and "International Merchandise mart." By the end of the 1940s, however, the site of the Exposition, now called Interama, was moved North to where Oleta River State Park is today.

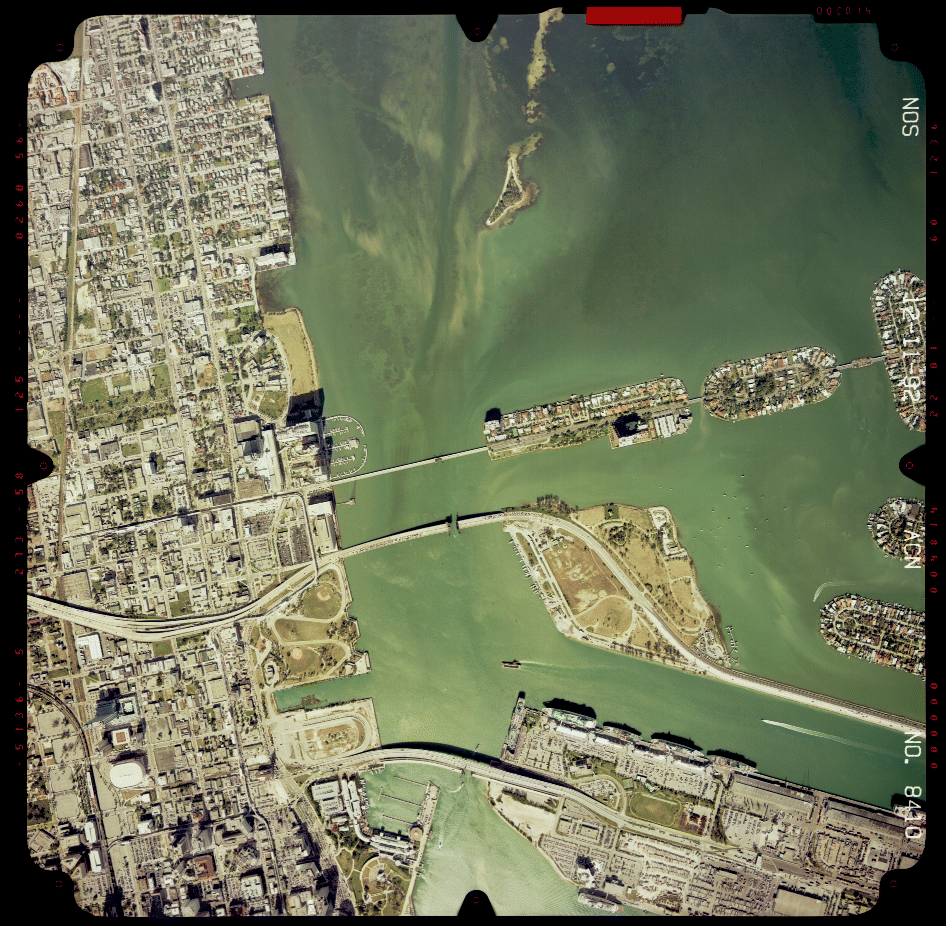
Aerial view of Watson Island (the diamond-shaped island near the center) in 1992, before major development of the island occurred.

A Goodyear Blimp base was located on Watson Island from 1930 to 1978, initially on the east side of the island and later on a new landfill area to the west. Goodyear moved the base to Opa-locka Airport after failing to agree on lease renewal terms with the city. Vestiges of the old base still remain such as the imprint of the mooring circle and a paved path for a small tram that would transport passengers to the airship.

Grand plans to develop the island started in 1979, with a planned amusement park, Diplomat World. Residents formed "Save Watson Island, Inc", a neighborhood group opposing the use for anything other than a park. They had public demonstrations and because of the demonstrations and a variety of other reasons, the amusement park was never built.

Another development included one from the late 1990s, culminating in 2003 when Jungle Island relocated to Watson. There has been continued controversy stemming from Jungle Island's inability to meet the financing terms it had made with the local municipalities when the move was approved. Local elected officials had and continue to bail out Jungle Island with tax dollars. The Miami Children's Museum also relocated to the island in 2003. The State of Florida offered a site in the Island Gardens project on Watson Island to host the Free Trade Area of the Americas (FTAA) Permanent Secretariat. As of March 2006 the Florida Department of Transportation was planning to construct a tunnel from the Port of Miami on Dodge Island under the main shipping channel to the MacArthur Causeway on Watson Island. On May 24, 2010, construction began on the Port of Miami Tunnel; it was completed on August 3, 2014.

== Current public facilities ==
Aviation Center
Chalk's International Airlines maintained a seaplane base on Watson Island from 1926 until it ceased operation in 2007. As of 2006, the City of Miami is relocating the Miami Heliport to a site adjacent to Chalk's seaplane base, with the intention of creating an Aviation Center serving corporate and tourism needs.

Ichimura Miami – Japanese Garden
The Ichimura Miami - Japanese Garden grew out of the efforts of Kiyoshi Ichimura, who sent objects, materials and artisans from Tokyo to Miami in the 1950s to construct the San-Ai-An Japanese Garden on Watson Island. The garden opened in 1961. As of 2006, the garden was being redesigned and reconstructed.

Jungle Island
Jungle Island opened its new facility on Watson Island in 2003. Originally named Parrot Jungle, the popular tourist attraction first opened in the Pinecrest neighborhood of Miami in 1936. Over the years, the attraction came to be a popular attraction for Miami residents and tourists, but that trend reversed once it moved to the smaller and less natural setting of Watson Island. Jungle Island has many fewer animals, and none of the old growth vegetation the original park was known for. Jungle Island hosts Miami's most popular event venue with its Treetop Ballroom.

Miami Children's Museum
The Miami Children's Museum opened a new 56,500-square-foot (5,250 m^{2}) facility on Watson Island in 2003. It has ten galleries, classrooms, birthday party rooms, a parent/teacher resource center, an educational gift shop, a 200-seat auditorium and a dining area.

Miami Outboard Club
The Miami Outboard Club has been located on Watson Island since 1948. It is active in conservation and artificial reef programs, and provides social and educational activities. The club has boat slips, dry storage, a boat lift, a ramp for jet skis and other small craft, and a restaurant, bar and internet cafe.

Miami Yacht Club
The Miami Yacht Club has been located on Watson Island since the late 1940s. It offers youth and adult sailing programs, and sponsors races, regattas and a Sea Scout ship. The club has boat slips, dry storage, and a lounge, bar and restaurant.

Public Boat Ramp
There is a Public Boat Ramp with 50 oversized parking spaces for vehicles with boat trailers.

== Future planning ==
In 2001, voters approved a bond measurer for what many thought was a public park for Watson Island and later many insisted they were tricked by the wording of the measure. However, the allowance was in fact for the City of Miami's public partnership with a developer for a mega-yacht marina related commercial development concept, Island Gardens.

In 2004 the City of Miami and Miami-Dade County approved Island Gardens, a $281 million, hotel and marina development on Watson Island. The development included two hotels, retail and restaurant space, landscaped promenade gardens and a marina serving mega yachts. An environmental watchdog group sued to halt the project, unsuccessfully.

In 2009 the equity investor Flagstone had signed up withdrew from the project due to the 2008 financial crisis and failure of bank syndication. The city forgave the developer, enabling them to keep right of development, extending the deadline for payments. Miami developer Jorge Perez, was interested as a partner in 2013, at which point the project jumped over three times to a proposed $1B project, with interest from the Related Companies. Jorge Perez later pulled out, citing, in part, concern about their expansion regarding City of Miami Beach residents, that the project will cause traffic nightmares on the causeway between the two cities. Flagstone submitted a new outline to the City of Miami that they were not increasing their approved numbers.

== Education ==
The local school district for the entire county is Miami-Dade County Public Schools. Zoned schools for Watson Island include:

- South Pointe Elementary School
- Nautilus Middle School
- Miami Beach High School

== See also ==
- Neighborhoods in Miami
- Port of Miami Tunnel
- Gator In The Bay
