= Gator In The Bay =

Floating art installation

Gator In The Bay is a floating, water-based art installation, promoting the salvation of the Everglades. It has appeared at Art Basel in Miami Beach, Florida and in Biscayne Bay.

== Construction ==
The head of the alligator is built on a self-propelled barge and is accompanied by 102 floating art tiles. Together, these tiles create a photo mosaic image of an alligator 230 feet long. Including the head, the entire installation is the world's largest artificial alligator at 275 feet long and took four years and $1 million to complete. Gator in the Bay appears different throughout the day and night. During the daylight hours, the illusion seems genuine. In darkness, the floating art tiles become dark alligator scales and silhouette with underwater lighting.

== About the artists ==
=== Lloyd Goradesky ===
The brain behind the installation, Goradesky created the floating art tiles each with thousands of his digital images of the Everglades. Together, these tiles make up the gator's body in a giant photo mosaic. More than 100,000 digital images were used to create the gator's body.

=== Kenneth Rowe ===
The 70 by 30-foot gator head is sculpted from reclaimed metal by this artist.

=== Waddy Thompson ===
This engineer is responsible for constructing the mechanism for opening and closing the mouth of the gator. Within the 30 foot head, an excavator powers the jaw. The entire head weighs 30,000 pounds.

== Purpose ==
Originally shown at Art Basel in Miami Beach, the Gator was created to raise awareness of the Everglades. The Miami New Times described Gator in the Bay as "just the kind of [art] to augment the Magic City's reputation as a Mecca for Artistic Lunacy."

Goradesky's work is complex and is compared to the works of Christo. As his list of accolades and recognition continues to grow, Goradesky is reaching a unique audience that appreciates the power of art and its message.

The opportunities for Gator in the Bay are endless, Gator in the Bay is a complete exhibit that includes T-shirts, posters, project diagrams, hats, books, and mixed media art. In addition to the sale of the Floating Art Tiles.
