= Government Cut =

Manmade shipping channel in Miami, USA

Coordinates: 25.7631025°N 80.1323461°W

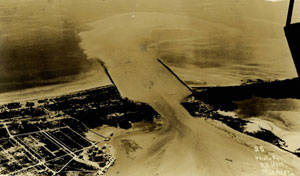
Aerial view of Government Cut, Miami Beach Florida, circa 1916.

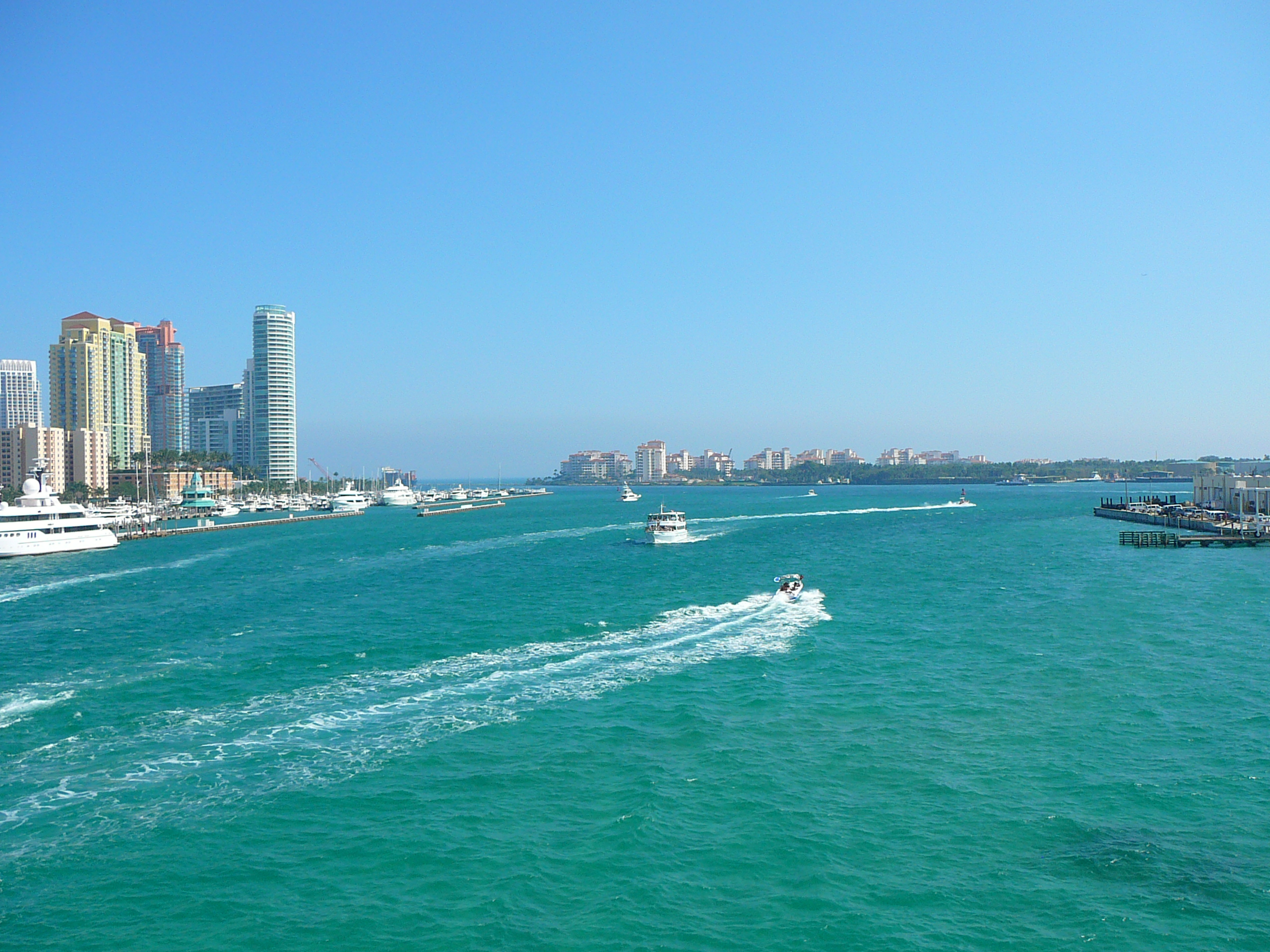
Government Cut as seen from the MacArthur Causeway on 15 March 2008.

Government Cut is a manmade shipping channel between Miami Beach and Fisher Island, which allows better access to the Port of Miami in Miami, Florida. Before the cut was established, a single peninsula of dry land stretched from what is now Miami Beach to what is now Fisher Island, and boats destined for the port at the mouth of the Miami River had to pass around Cape Florida, to the south of Key Biscayne.

Opened in 1905, the cut across the peninsula that is now Miami Beach was authorized by the U.S. government (hence the name), in order to provide a direct route from the Atlantic Ocean on the east to the seaport on Biscayne Bay to the west, without having to detour southward. The cut across the mangroves and beach at the southern end of the peninsula created Fisher Island, which except for the extreme northeast corner, is part of unincorporated Miami-Dade County, Florida. The now-famous South Beach is to the north of the cut.

== Establishment ==
Government Cut was authorized by the U.S. Congress in 1902, after the United States House Committee on Rivers and Harbors approved it on June 13 of that year. Dredging began in 1903, and finished in the summer of 1905. Fill from the dredging was used to add to the privately owned Fisher Island. Later dredging to widen and deepen the cut also added land area to the Port of Miami, and created the foundation for the MacArthur Causeway (east of Interstate 395).

== Operation ==
Operation of the cut falls upon three government agencies. The Port of Miami is responsible for navigation, while the United States Coast Guard is responsible for safety and security, and the U.S. Army Corps of Engineers for the channel itself, including dredging.

== Notoriety ==
Local ocean tides for Miami are reported for the entrance to Government Cut. The next-closest point on the mainland for tide information is Jupiter Inlet, to the north.

On December 19, 2005, the vintage Grumann G-73T Turbine Mallard seaplane providing Chalk's Ocean Airways Flight 101 crashed immediately offshore Government Cut, temporarily closing the channel to all traffic and trapping freighters and cruise ships on both sides.

On September 25, 2016, Miami Marlins pitcher José Fernández died in a boating accident at Government Cut. The boat hit the jetty and capsized, killing Fernández and two other men on board, 25-year-old Eduardo Rivero, and 27-year-old Emilio Macias, the son of a Miami-Dade police detective.

== External links and references ==
- Miami-Dade County: Government Cut centennial
- US Army Corps of Engineers records
