= Midtown Skyport =

Former seaplane base in Manhattan, New York

- IATA: none; ICAO: none

Summary
- Location: New York City
- Opened: May 8, 1935
- Closed: early 1940s
- Elevation AMSL: 0 ft / 0 m
- Coordinates: 40°44′28″N 73°58′21″W

Map
- Interactive map of Midtown Skyport

Midtown Skyport was a seaplane base in New York City, located at Pier 79 on the East River near the foot of 31st Street in Manhattan. Opened in 1935, the Midtown Skyport only operated for a few years due to the construction of the East River Drive and the opening of a new seaplane base on the East River near 23rd Street. From 1936 to 1940, the seaplane base at 31st Street accommodated scheduled passenger service to Philadelphia operated by Keystone Airlines.

== History ==
=== Background ===
In the 1930s, one of Mayor Fiorello La Guardia's efforts to promote aviation in New York City involved the construction of two city-owned seaplane bases, located on the East River at the ends of 31st Street and Wall Street, which were called the Midtown Skyport and Downtown Skyport, respectively. Their purpose was to facilitate the use of seaplanes by private owners, provide seaplane commuting services to suburban areas, and encourage airlines to provide direct service to Manhattan. An air taxi service was also planned between the seaplane bases in Manhattan and Floyd Bennett Field in Brooklyn, which opened in 1930 as city's first municipal airport.

The foot of 31st Street had previously been used as a launching spot for amphibious aircraft into the East River. Loening Aeronautical Engineering Company had its factory on the block between First Avenue and the waterfront. The company had built a floating ramp for amphibians alongside the pier at the end of 31st Street—which it leased from the city—that enabled aircraft to taxi in and out of the water. Before this, aircraft from the factory were brought out to the pier and had to be hoisted into the river using a crane. The private ramp was also used by some aircraft transporting passengers to Manhattan. In 1927, aircraft manufacturer Grover Loening had supported the development of a municipal seaplane base near 23rd Street, pointing out that conditions in the East River were more suitable for waterborne aircraft compared to those in the Hudson River, and all that was needed was the addition of a 300-foot-long (91 m) by 180-foot-wide (55 m) platform to the existing dock at 24th Street. Plans to use this site, which was being used as an anchorage for the New York Yacht Club, were considered by Mayor Jimmy Walker's Committee on Airports the following year.

=== Construction and opening ===
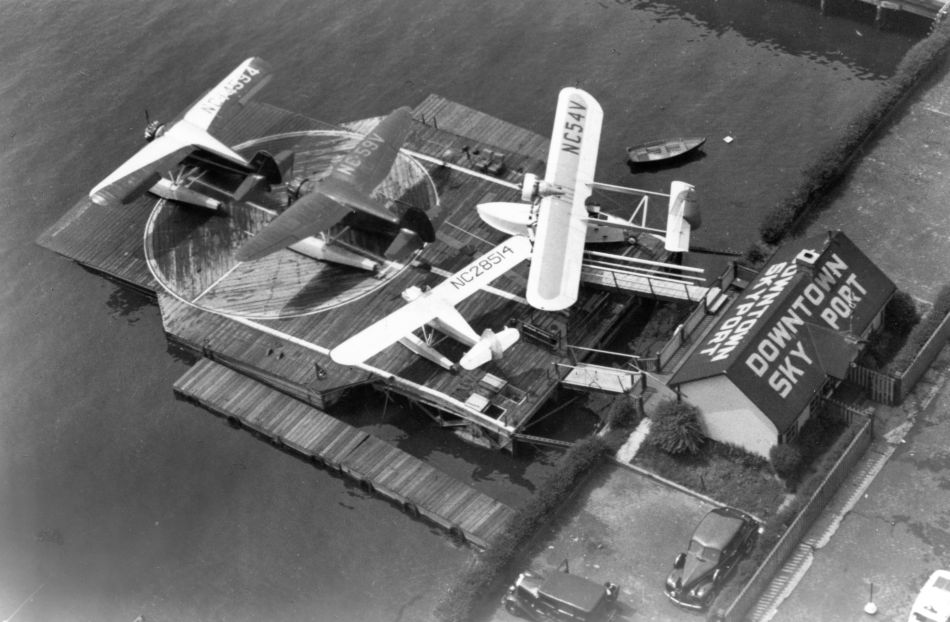
Floating ramp and turntable in use at the Downtown Skyport in the 1940s

Each of the new seaplane bases on the East River had a 86-by-56-foot (26 by 17 m) floating ramp that was constructed at the Brooklyn Navy Yard using Temporary Emergency Relief Administration (TERA) funds. The floating ramp included a 45-foot (14 m) diameter turntable that allowed planes to taxi from the water onto the partially submerged end of the turntable and be rotated 180 degrees so the rear of the plane moved out of the water, allowing passengers to quickly load and unload before the aircraft returned to the water for takeoff. The entire process could be done in less than 40 seconds. By using the turntable, seaplanes did not have spend extra time tying up to a dock or using a boat to transport passengers to and from the shore. The aquatic turntable was similar to one used at the seaplane terminal in Jersey City that opened in 1933 and was one of the first such turntables in the United States.

The Downtown Skyport opened in September 1934. Meanwhile, construction of the Midtown Skyport was approved by the Sinking Fund Commission on February 27, 1935, using $20,000 of funds from TERA. During construction of the new seaplane base at 31st Street, the project to develop the floating ramps for it and the Downtown Skyport was criticized for poor management as it was found to have cost nearly four times the original estimate. The project was examined by a Aldermanic committee investigating relief projects, with Lloyd Paul Stryker serving as counsel to the committee. The Midtown Skyport opened on May 8, 1935; the facility included a one-story terminal building with a porch on Pier 79.

Works Progress Administration poster showcasing the municipal airports in New York City, ca. 1937

The following month, more than 100 mayors attending the Conference on Seaport Cities received a demonstration of the use of the seaplane ramp and turntable from the deck of the USS J. Fred Talbott while they were being taken on a tour of the harbor. By August 1935, the Midtown Skyport was being used by affluent workers commuting from Long Island. The new East River seaplane base at 31st Street—along with the other seaplane base at Wall Street, as well as Floyd Bennett Field and North Beach Airport—were included in a poster promoting New York City's municipal airports that was developed for the Federal Art Project sponsored by the Works Progress Administration.

In March 1936, the city began construction of a new seaplane base on the East River near 23rd Street. One of the objectives of the new seaplane base was to provide a faster airmail link between Floyd Bennett Field and Manhattan, as the Madison Square Post Office was located nearby and connected by pneumatic mail tubes to the General Post Office across from Pennsylvania Station. The city had originally planned to close both the Midtown Skyport and Downtown Skyport to consolidate all operations to the new seaplane base at 23rd Street, but ended up deciding to keep all three facilities in place.

On October 31, 1936, Keystone Airlines began providing passenger service to Philadelphia, operating between the Midtown Skyport and the Bainbridge Street Wharf on the Delaware River. The airline purchased two Sikorsky S-38s to operate the service, which had three daily round trips. Georgina Pope Yeatman was a passenger on the inaugural flight from Philadelphia to New York City, who was representing Philadelphia Mayor S. Davis Wilson. It was the first airline to provide intercity service from the seaplane base at 31st Street. Keystone Airlines operated service on the route until 1940.

In December 1936, the Twenty-third Street Association held a luncheon and passed a resolution calling for a hearing with the city asking why the seaplane base at 23rd Street had not been further advanced. A speaker at the luncheon from Keystone Airlines said that the present terminal at the Midtown Skyport was inadequate. Construction of the new seaplane base at 23rd Street resumed in 1938, by then the facility was being planned to serve as a replacement for the Midtown Skyport at 31st Street. The improvements were made using $500,000 of Works Progress Administration funds. A total of 535 aircraft used the Midtown Skyport during the 1938 season, which officially ran from May 9 to November 1.

=== Closure ===
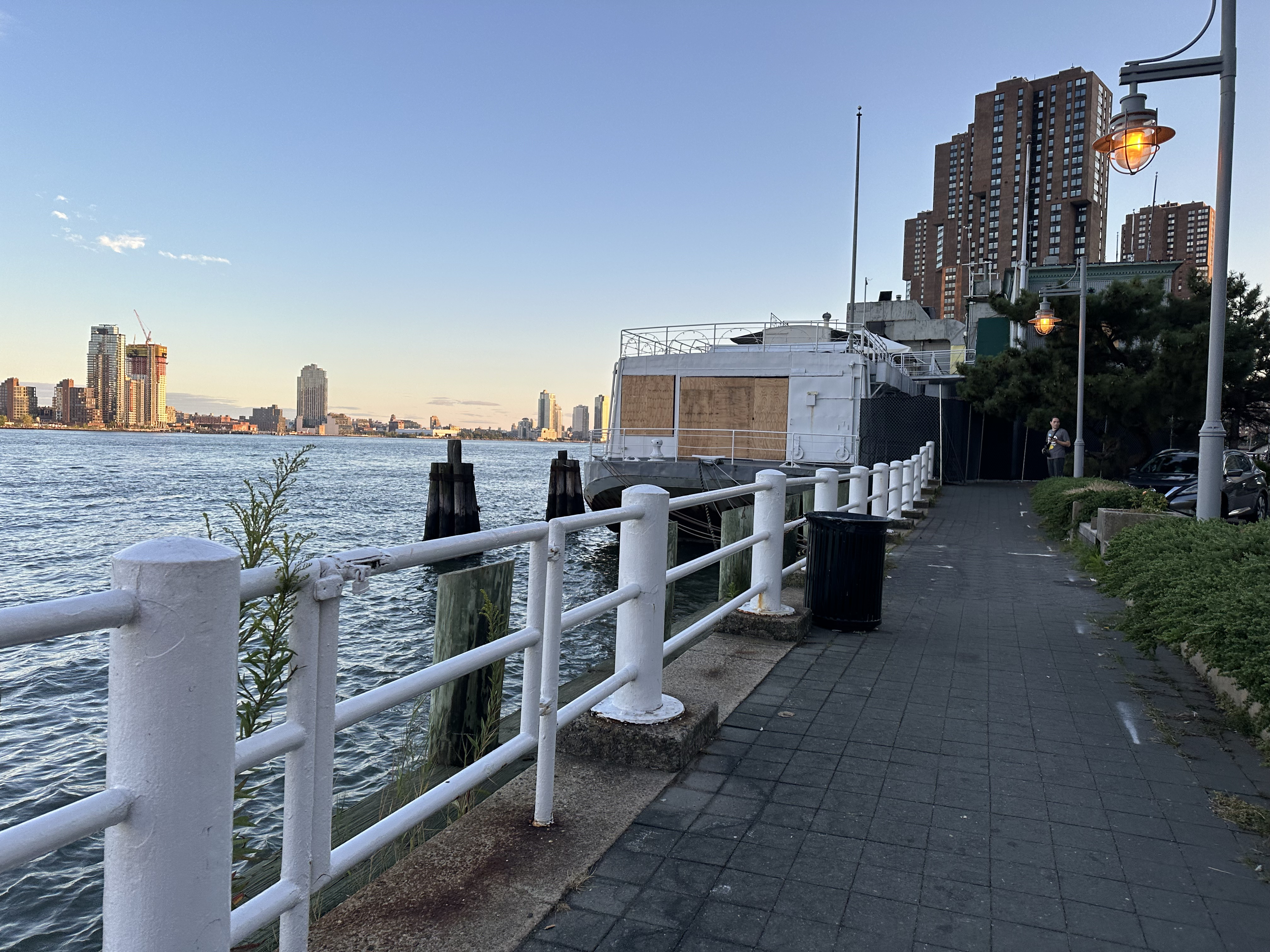
The former site of the Midtown Skyport in 2024, showing waterfront esplanade and The Water Club

The new seaplane base at 23rd Street, which became known as the New York Skyports Seaplane Base, opened in 1939. By 1941, the seaplane base at 31st Street had closed when the segment of the East River Drive between 23rd and 34th streets was completed. As part of the construction of the highway, a new bulkhead was built and landfill was added to extend the shoreline, covering the former site of Pier 79. Much of the landfill was brought to the United States as ships' ballast from the rubble of the city of Bristol in England during World War II. The turntable from the Midtown Skyport was moved to the new seaplane base at 23rd Street before the opening of the 1941 season.

The former site of the seaplane base at 31st Street was subsequently used as a parking lot and later as a waterfront esplanade with parking for The Water Club, a restaurant and event venue moored on barges in the river.
