= United States Post Office (Madison Square Station) =

Historic post office in Manhattan, New York

- United States Post Office; Madison Square Station
- U.S. National Register of Historic Places
- New York State Register of Historic Places
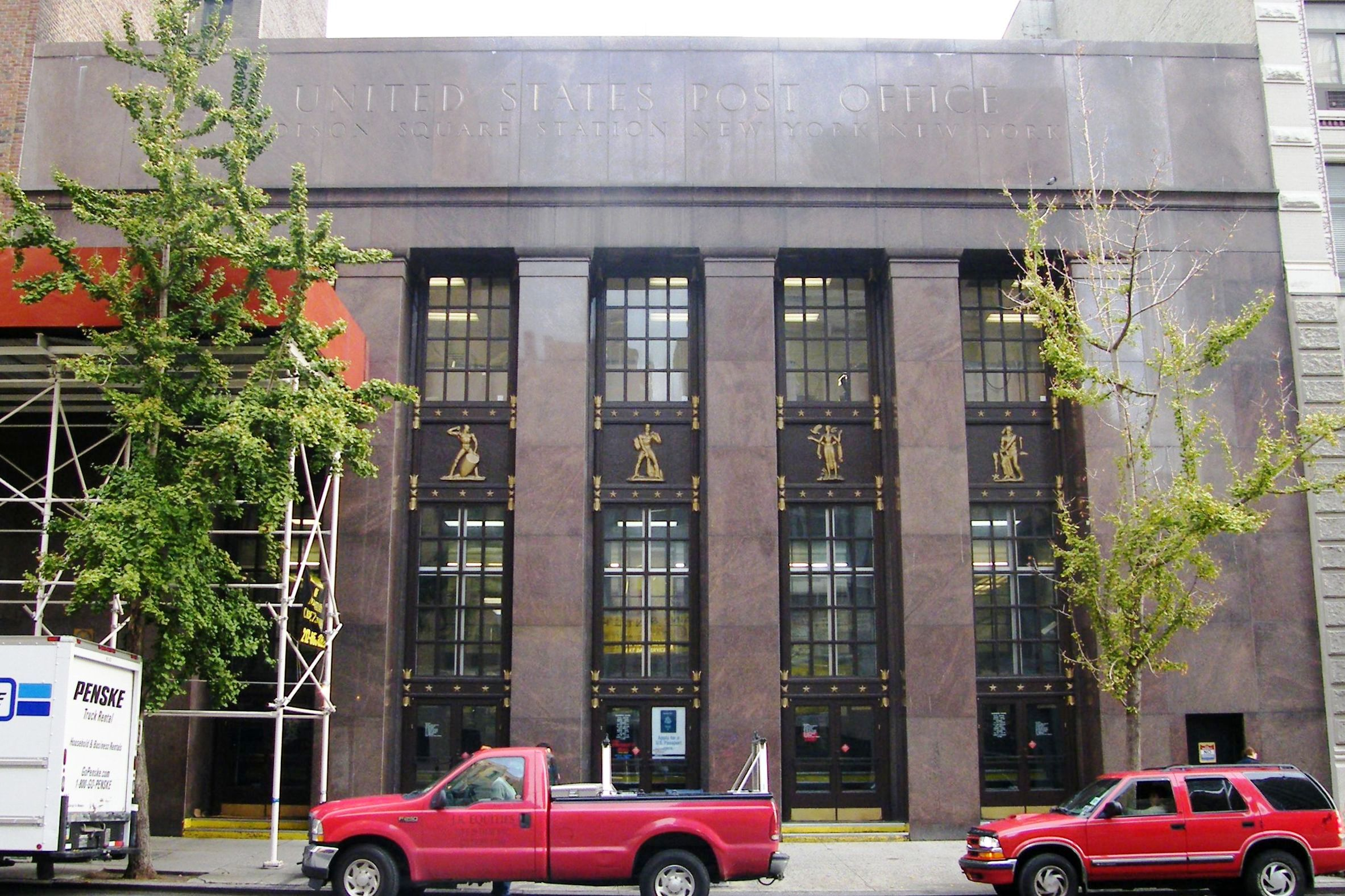
- (October 2008)

- Location within New York City Location within New York Location within the United States
- Location: 149-153 E. 23rd St. Manhattan, New York City
- Coordinates: 40°44′22″N 73°59′2″W
- Built: 1937
- Architect: Lorimer Rich
- Architectural style: Classical Revival
- MPS: US Post Offices in New York State, 1858-1943, TR
- NRHP reference No.: 88002364
- NYSRHP No.: 06101.001785

Significant dates
- Added to NRHP: May 11, 1989
- Designated NYSRHP: May 11, 1989

The United States Post Office Madison Square Station is a historic post office building located at 149 East 23rd Street between Lexington Avenue and Third Avenue on the East Side of Manhattan, New York City. It was designed by architect Lorimer Rich and was completed in 1937. The post office was listed on the National Register of Historic Places on May 11, 1989

== History ==
The United States Post Office Madison Square Station is located at 149 East 23rd Street, between Lexington Avenue and Third Avenue on the East Side of Manhattan, New York City. In spite of the building's name, it is not located on Madison Square but about three blocks east (approximately 1/4 mile) along 23rd Street. The building runs through the block to East 24th Street, where there are loading docks and another much smaller and less formal public entrance.

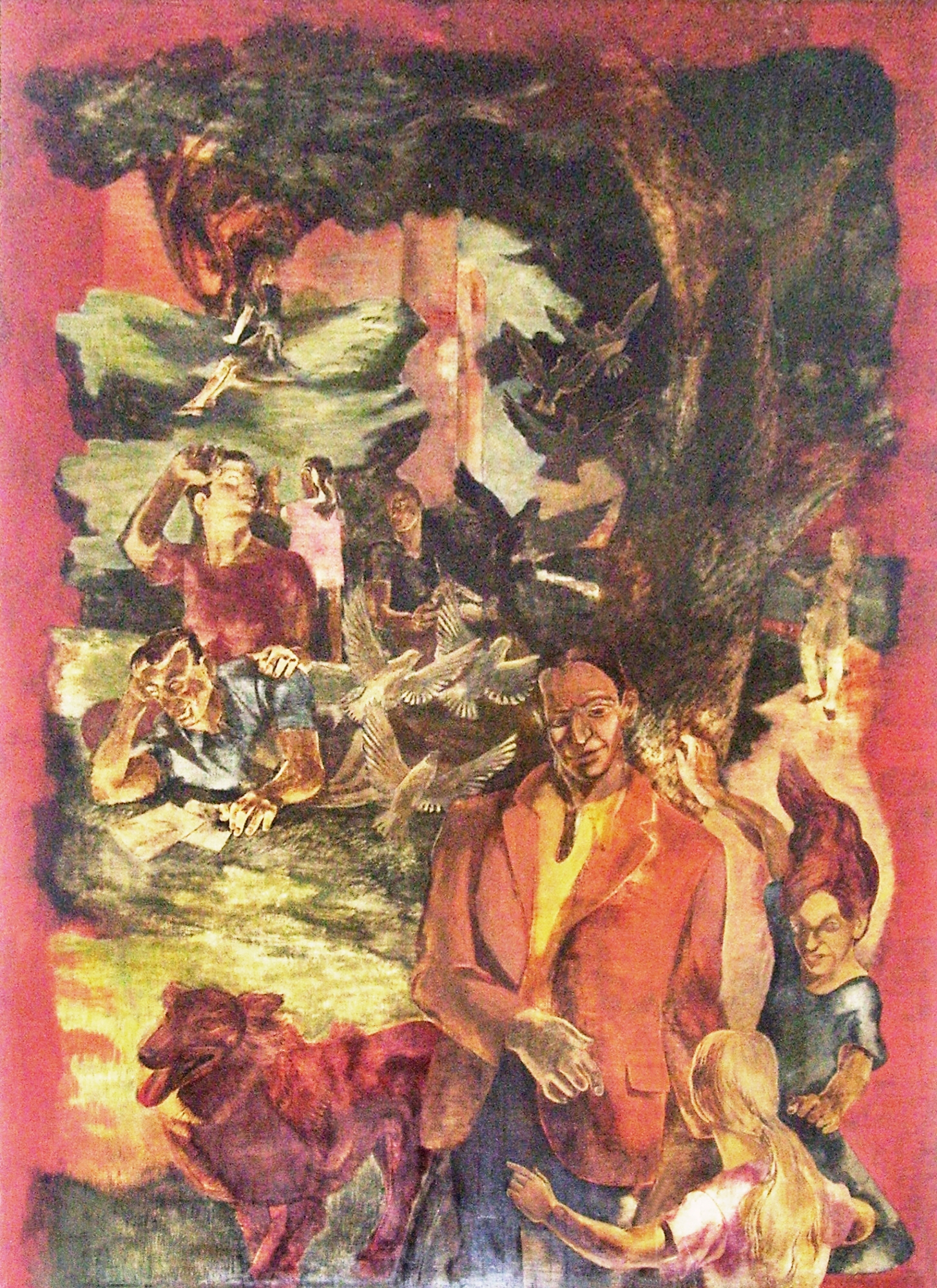
One of Kindred McLeary's murals

In the mid-1930s, the post office was included as part of a plan to have Floyd Bennett Field in Brooklyn designated as the eastern terminus of air mail, forming a link in the delivery of mail to the General Post Office through its connection to the pneumatic mail tube system. The plan involved using flying boats to transport mail from Floyd Bennett Field to a new seaplane base on East 23rd Street that was being constructed nearby.

The Madison Square Station was listed on the National Register of Historic Places in 1989. In 2025, the Historic Districts Council, in partnership with the Rose Hill/Kips Bay Coalition, requested the New York City Landmarks Preservation Commission evaluate the building for potential designation as an individual landmark and an interior landmark.

== Architecture ==
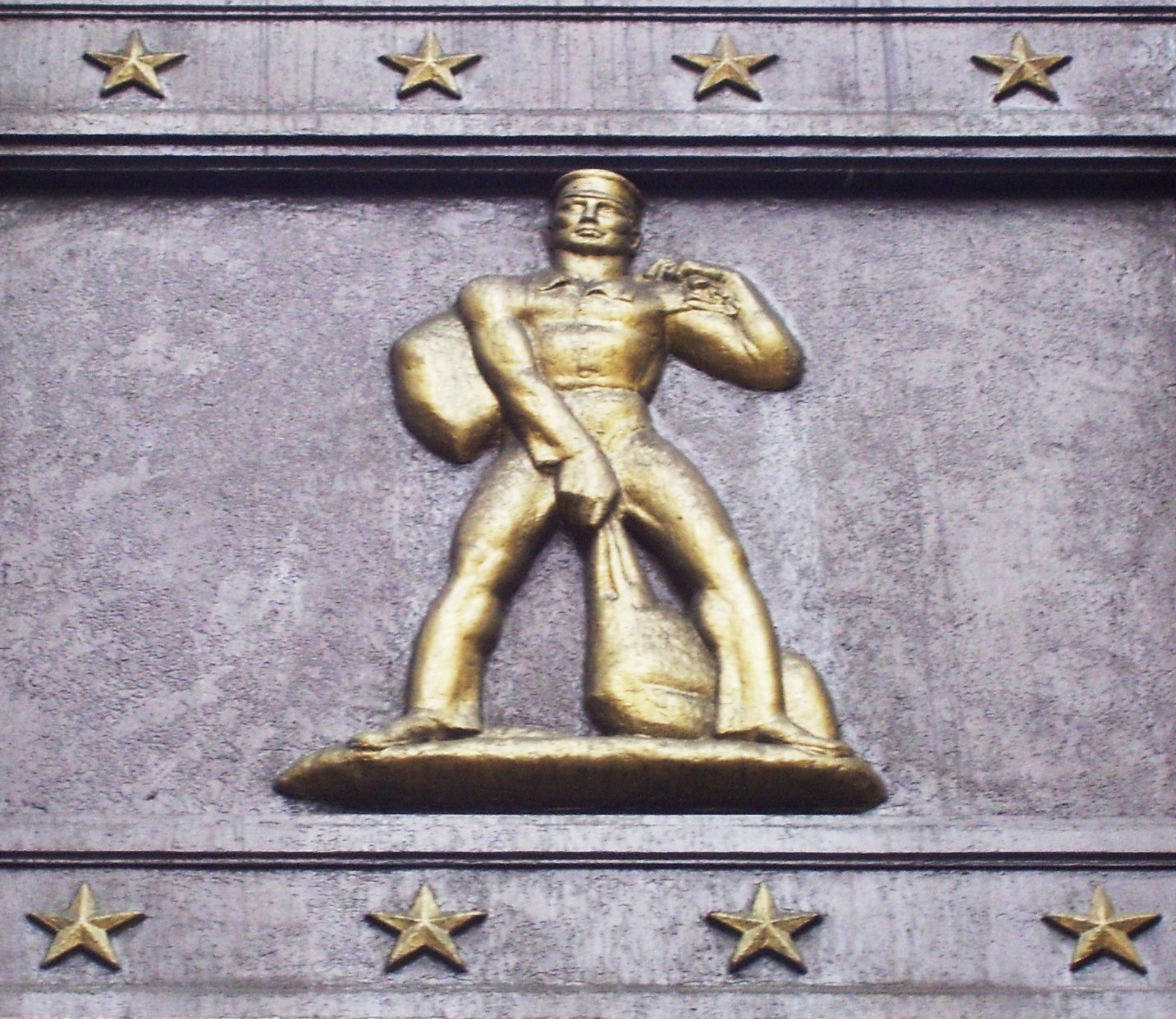
The central of the five relief sculptures shows a mailman with mailbags

The building was constructed in 1937, and was designed by Lorimer Rich for Louis A. Simon, the Supervising Architect of the Treasury. It is a two to three story building clad on its main facade with polished "Dakota Mahogany" granite in the Classical Revival style.

The main facade features six two-story Doric order piers and pilaster that surround the recessed entrance bays. The exterior also features five bronze relief sculptures by artists Edmond Amateis and Louis Slobodkin illustrating different forms of communication: from west to east, the god Mercury, jungle drums, mail, carrier pigeon, and smoke signals. The interior features eight murals executed between 1937 and 1939 by artist Kindred McLeary.
