= New York Skyports Seaplane Base =

New York Skyports Inc. Seaplane Base
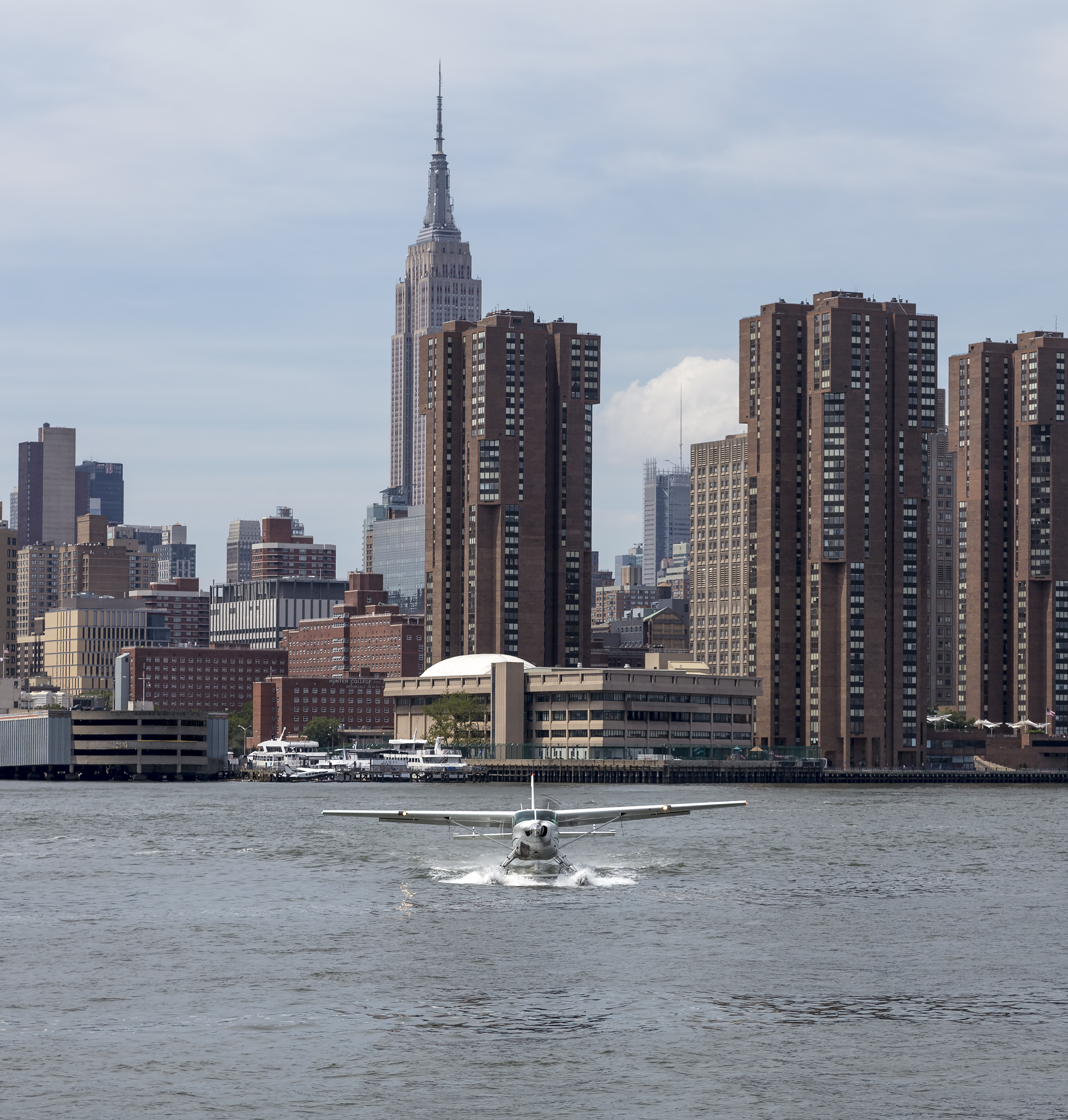
- IATA: NYS; ICAO: none; FAA LID: 6N7

Summary
- Airport type: Public
- Owner: New York City
- Operator: Torrell Miller
- Serves: New York City
- Location: New York City, United States
- Hub for: Tropic Ocean Airways Seasonal Hub
- Elevation AMSL: 0 ft (0 m)
- Coordinates: 40°44′06″N 73°58′22″W
- Website: docknyc.com/skyport

Map
- Interactive map of New York Skyports Inc. Seaplane Base

Runways
Direction	Length		Surface
Direction	ft	m	Surface
N/S	10,000	3,048	Water

Statistics (2022)
- General Aviation: 0
- Airtaxi: 1,768
- Source: Airnav

New York Skyports Inc. Seaplane base (IATA: NYS, FAA LID: 6N7) is a seaplane base in the East River VFR corridor in New York City, located at the foot of East 23rd Street between Waterside Plaza and Stuyvesant Cove Park. The seaplane base opened in 1939 and was later incorporated into the Skyport Marina that was completed in 1962. It is the only seaplane base in New York City.

== History ==
=== Opening and early years ===
The establishment of a new seaplane base at East 23rd Street was initially promoted in the mid-1930s by mayor Fiorello LaGuardia, who wanted to renovate an abandoned pier on the East River that had been previously used as a terminal for ferries operating to Greenpoint, Brooklyn.

One of the original objectives of the new seaplane base was to provide a faster airmail link to Manhattan. At that time, Mayor LaGuardia had been advocating the designation of Floyd Bennett Field in Brooklyn as the eastern terminus of air mail instead of Newark Airport in New Jersey, but Newark Airport held an advantage because it had a shorter travel time for trucks carrying mail to and from Manhattan. A seaplane link between Floyd Bennett Field and East 23rd Street was proposed as a solution to cut the travel time between the Brooklyn and Manhattan. The new seaplane base would also be close to the Madison Square Station Post Office on East 23rd Street, which was connected by pneumatic mail tubes to the General Post Office across from Pennsylvania Station.

In addition to serving as an air mail link, the seaplane base was also planned to serve as a passenger link by ferrying air passengers between Manhattan and Floyd Bennett Field. It also aligned with Mayor LaGuardia's plans to develop aviation facilities closer to the center of the city.

Work on the new seaplane base began in March 1936. The facility was planned to accommodate eight planes loading or unloading at a time and included ramps that allowed seaplanes to taxi out of the water to the terminal or parking areas, a dock for flying boats, and a turntable. The design of the terminal building included a waiting room on the ground floor, a restaurant, observation lounge, and administration offices on the second floor, and a pilots' lounge and bedrooms on the third floor. A tower above the building would house facilities for radio, weather, and air traffic control.

Works Progress Administration poster showcasing the municipal airports in New York City, ca. 1937

The city had originally planned to close its two other East River seaplane bases—the Downtown Skyport at Wall Street and the Midtown Skyport at East 31st Street—to consolidate all operations to the new seaplane base at East 23rd Street, but ended up deciding to keep all three facilities in place.

Although construction work on the seaplane base at East 23rd Street had started in 1936, the facility did not open until 1939. The Brooklyn Times-Union speculated that construction was initially rushed because due to the receipt of a bid from an airline to operate a seaplane service between New York and Boston that summer. By March 1936, two airlines had bid for the use of the 23rd Street Skyport for regular service to Boston. In May 1936, engineers from the Dock Department estimated that the new seaplane base could open that August and noted that it did not need to be fully completed for the first passengers because initial volumes were expected to be light and there had been no further developments in the proposed airline service to Boston. They said that full facilities such as a glass-enclosed terminal would be completed later.

On October 31, 1936, Keystone Airlines began providing seaplane service to Bainbridge Street Wharf on the Delaware River in Philadelphia, but operated out of the Midtown Skyport. It was the first airline to provide intercity service from the seaplane base at East 31st Street. In December 1936, the Twenty-third Street Association held a luncheon and passed a resolution calling for a hearing with the city asking why the seaplane base at East 23rd Street had not been further advanced. A speaker at the luncheon from Keystone Airlines said that the present terminal at the Midtown Skyport was inadequate. Keystone Airlines operated service on the seaplane route between New York and Philadelphia from 1936 to 1940.

Construction of the new seaplane base at East 23rd Street resumed by 1938, which was then planned to replace the Midtown Skyport at East 31st Street. The improvements to the seaplane base were made using $500,000 of Works Progress Administration funds. The seaplane base at East 31st Street closed by 1941, when the segment of the East River Drive between East 23rd and East 34th streets was completed, as terminal building for the Midtown Skyport was located in the path of the new highway.

=== Late 20th century ===
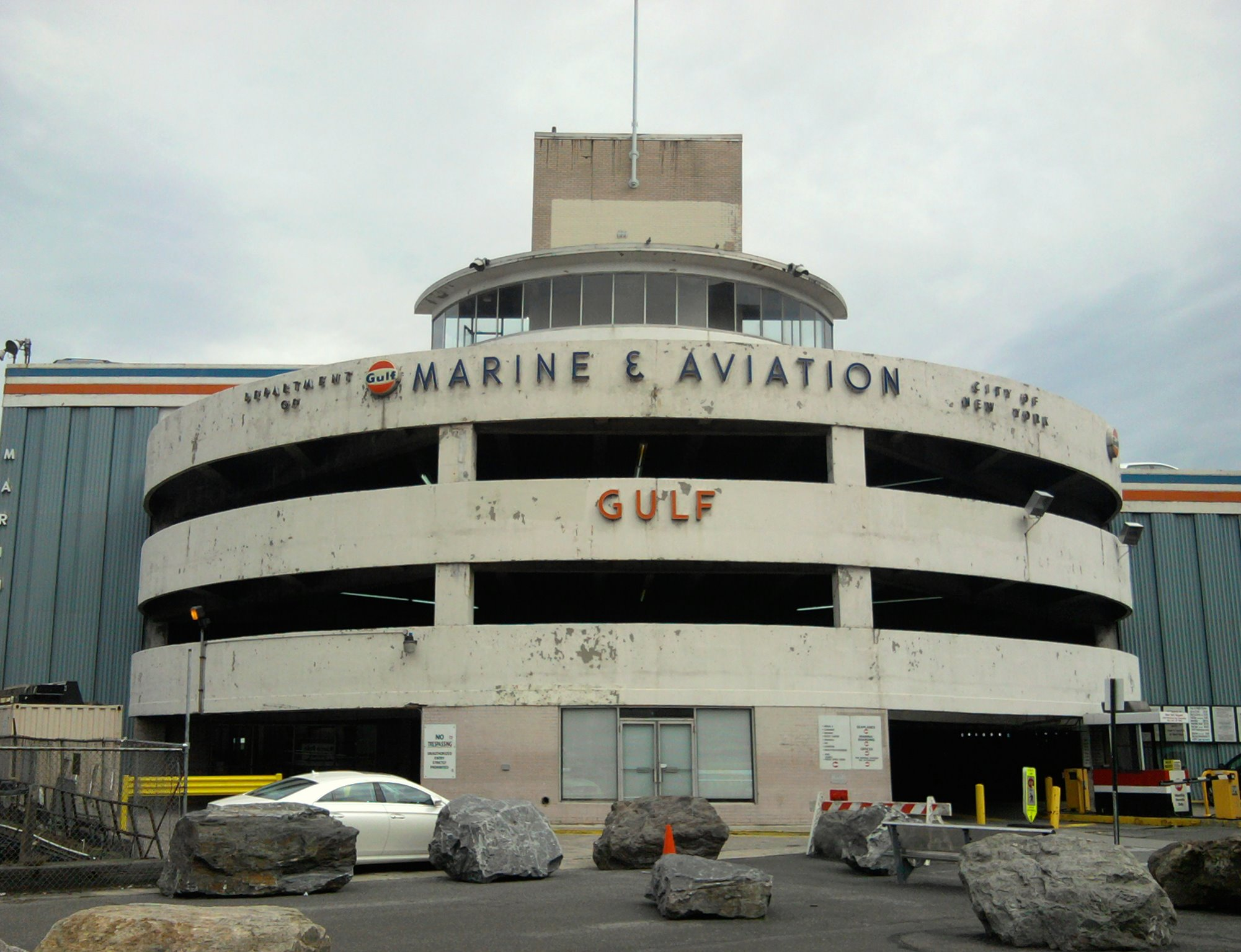
The parking garage at Skyport Marina in 2011

The seaplane base at East 23rd Street later became part of the Skyport Marina, a $1,400,000 multipurpose waterfront facility designed by Praeger, Kavanagh & Waterbury that opened on April 18, 1962 and included a four-level parking garage with space for 500 cars on a pier extending 360 feet (110 m) into the river and a marina with berths for 37 pleasure craft. The facility was leased to Gulf Oil Corporation, which relocated and modernized its auto service station near the end of East 23rd Street as part of the pier redevelopment project. Gulf Oil had been operating the seaplane base at East 23rd Street since 1940.

In the early 1970s, residents of the nearby Stuyvesant Town and Peter Cooper Village apartment complexes began urging the city to shut down the seaplane base over noise concerns. The city's Marine and Aviation Department issued directives in 1972 requiring seaplanes to taxi out as least 500 feet (150 m) from the shoreline before beginning their takeoff run to reduce the noise the aircraft were causing in waterfront areas.

Local residents continued in their efforts to close the seaplane base and by 1974 gained the support of Ed Koch, who was serving as the representative of New York's 18th congressional district, and Ethan Eldon, the Commissioner of the city's Department of Air Resources. At that time, the Marine and Aviation Department was requiring seaplanes to taxi out at least 1,000 feet (300 m) from the shore for takeoffs and limited noise levels to 88 decibels (dB), but the department anticipated that noise levels would further decrease if the Federal Aviation Administration approved a three-bladed propeller. Later that year, an agreement was reached between local residents and the Marine and Aviation Department to reduce the noise limit to 80 dB and also require aircraft using the seaplane base to have noise-reducing propellers. Initial tests were conducted on a seaplane in the East River using a three-bladed propeller developed by DeVore Aviation Corporation in January 1975, but the results of the noise measurements did not impress city officials. Later that year, the Marine and Aviation Department claimed that noise levels at the seaplane base had been reduced by 30 percent, but the results were disputed and contradicted separate noise measurements that had been collected by the Department of Air Resources.

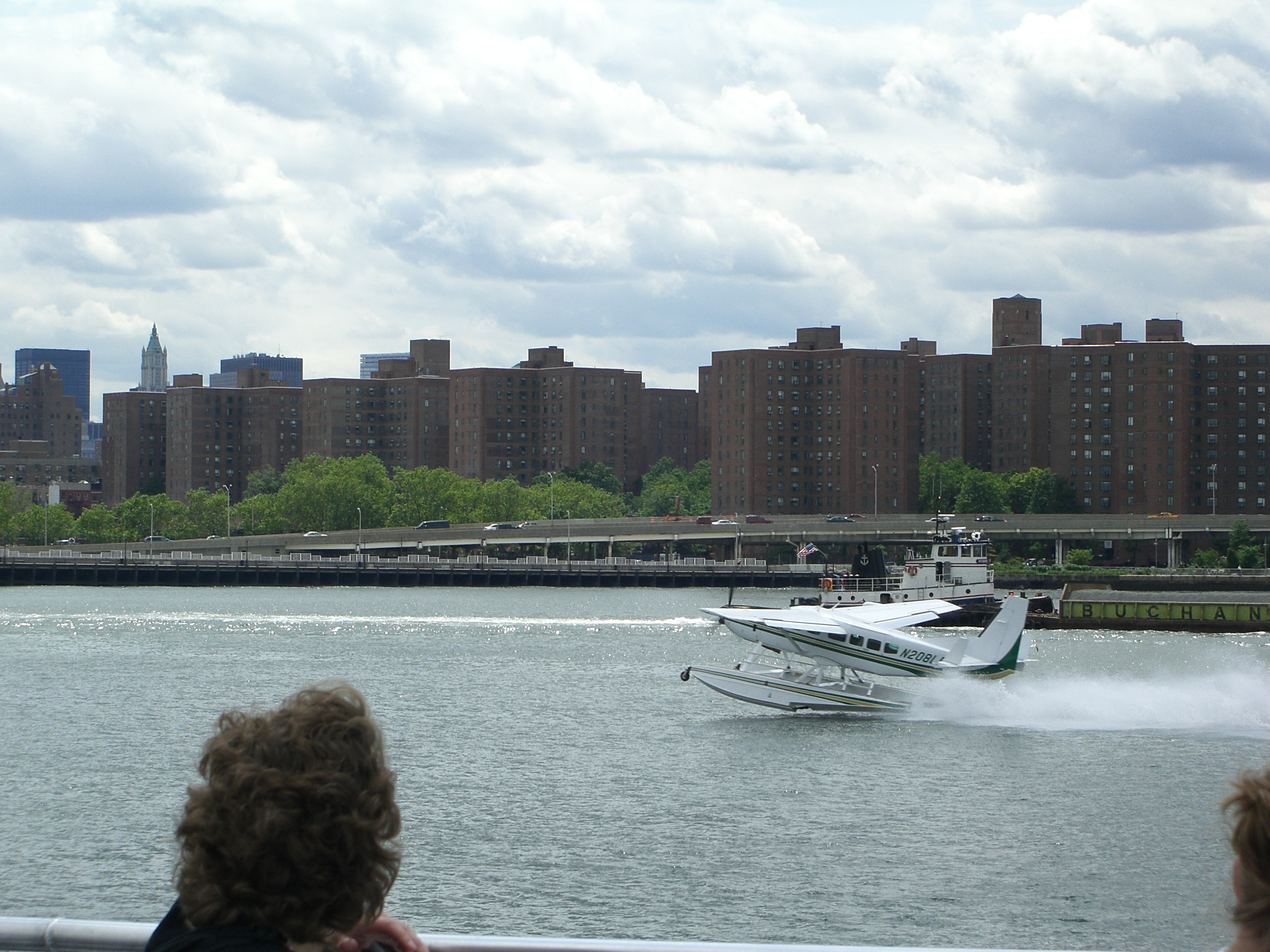
Seaplane on the East River near Stuyvesant Town and Peter Cooper Village

In 1976, Seaplane Shuttle Transportation, which at the time was an airline beginning operations between the Wall Street Seaplane Base and Penn's Landing on the Delaware River in Philadelphia, tried to establish a new seaplane terminal at East 34th Street to provide more convenient service for business travelers destined to Midtown Manhattan. The application for the new terminal failed to advance and Seaplane Shuttle Transportation ended all of its flights in 1977, citing the lack of a landing site in Midtown Manhattan as one of the reasons contributing to the company's decision to discontinue operations. Had the seaplane base at East 34th Street been approved, a stipulation added to the proposed application would have terminated the city's lease with the seaplane base operator at East 23rd Street when it was set to expire in 1978.

The seaplane base was shut down for a six-month period in the beginning of 1983, when the city refused to renew its permit over noise complaints and concerns over safety with increased helicopter traffic due to new flights from the East 34th Street Heliport and the East 60th Street Heliport to John F. Kennedy International Airport. The temporary closure forced all seaplane operations in Manhattan to be accommodated by the Wall Street Seaplane Base. After failed attempts at negotiations between New York Skyports and the city, the issue was taken to court and a justice of State Supreme Court ordered the city to renew the permit.

Seaplane tours were offered from Skyport Marina by Sea Air NY beginning in January 1999, but only operated for a couple of months before commercial air tours were banned from using the city-owned pier over noise concerns.

=== 21st century ===
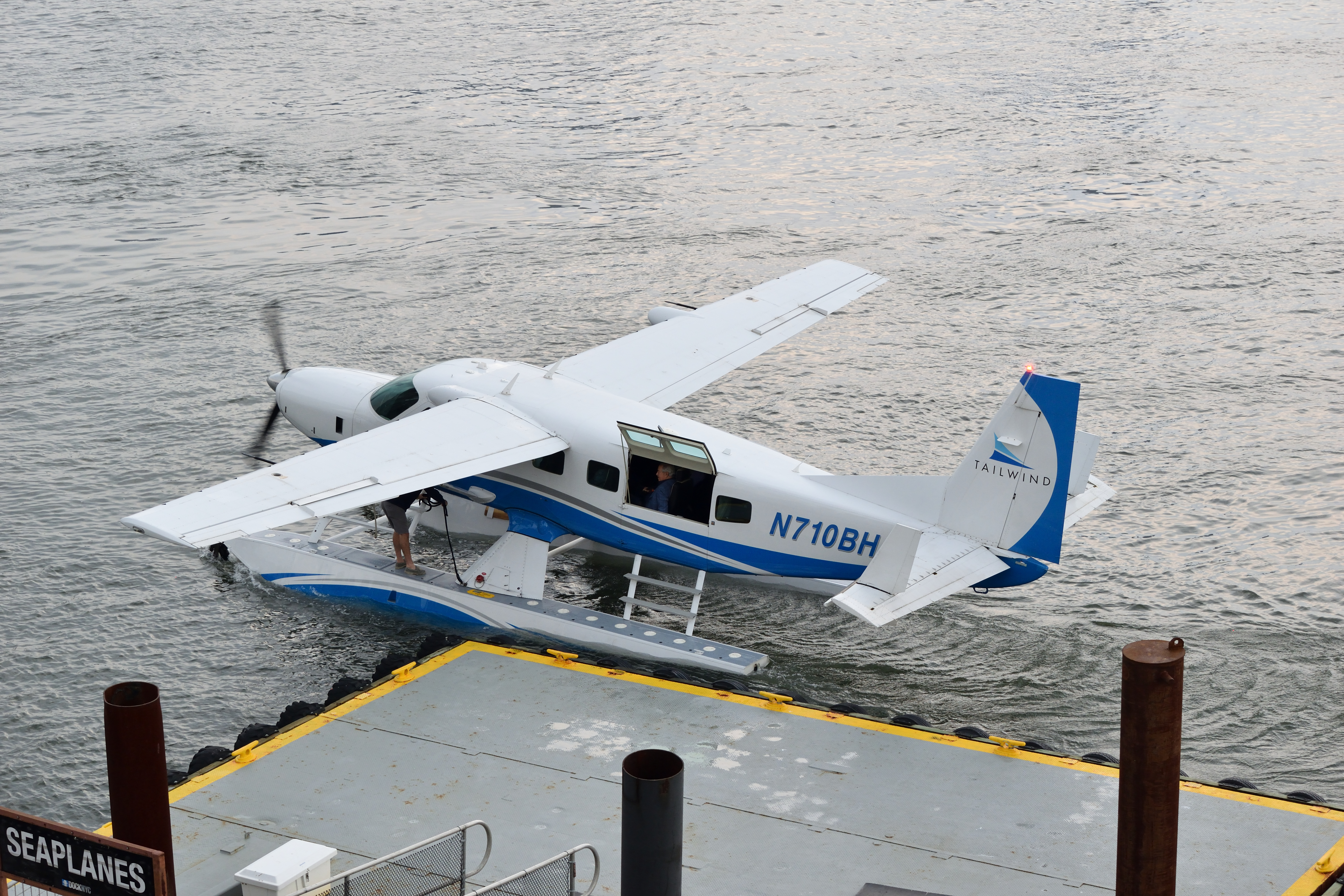
Tailwind Air seaplane leaving the dock at the New York Skyport

In August 2021, Tailwind Air began providing scheduled service from the seaplane base at East 23rd Street to Boston Harbor. It took more than five years for the airline to arrange the service and obtain the permits needed to operate the route, which was planned to operate seasonally from March through November.

Tailwind Air expanded its intercity operations by providing scheduled seaplane service between Manhattan and Washington, D.C., in October 2022. The airline had originally intended to fly to College Park Airport in Maryland, but delayed the launch of service by a month and opted to use a private terminal at Dulles International Airport for its initial service while the Transportation Security Administration and the Federal Aviation Administration evaluated security concerns for the proposed commercial flights within the National Capital Region restricted airspace.

In October 2022, the New York City Economic Development Corporation (NYCEDC) announced that the city was selected as a recipient for a $5 million federal grant from the United States Maritime Administration to develop micro-distribution facilities that would receive waterborne freight deliveries and facilitate last-mile deliveries by greener forms of transportation such as ebikes. One of the six landing sites proposed in the application was a new barge alongside the Skyport Marina. The city subsequently issued a request for proposal for engineering firms to design the micro-distribution facilities at the six sites.

In 2024, NYCEDC filed a permit with the United States Army Corps of Engineers to rehabilitate the Skyport Marina. The proposed work would include replacing the existing 30-foot-wide (9.1 m) by 40-foot-long (12 m) seaplane float at the east end of the marina with a new 30-foot-wide (9.1 m) by 90-foot-long (27 m) seaplane float that could accommodate two seaplanes.

== Operations ==
There are no instrument approaches for this airport. Pilots must receive special training and be approved by a member of the North East Seaplanes Pilot's Association and are not permitted to fly over the Queensboro Bridge.

Most operations at the seaplane base occur between May and September, when flights are made for weekend getaways to Fire Island and the Hamptons, although seaplanes can land throughout the year provided that there is no ice in the river.

== Airlines and destinations ==
=== Passenger ===
Airlines	Destinations
Blade	Seasonal: East Hampton, Sag Harbor

== Accidents and incidents ==
- On July 27, 1947, a Grumman Mallard carrying two passengers commuting from Port Washington lost a pontoon during an attempted landing when the seaplane was caught in a swell from a passing ship. No injuries were reported.
- On July 15, 1948, a seaplane taxiing for takeoff suffered an engine failure and was carried by the wind and tide towards the Brooklyn shore before it was rescued by a boat commandeered by the police. The plane was carrying John Reid Topping, the brother of New York Yankees president Dan Topping.
- On August 28, 1950, a Republic Seabee struck an object in the river as it was coming in for a landing. The pilot and four passengers were rescued by nearby boats before the plane sank. The passengers only suffered minor injuries.
- On June 30, 1957, a Piper Tri-Pacer nosed over on its final approach for landing and crashed into the river. The pilot had lost control of the plane when a passenger became airsick and fell into the pilot or the control stick. The three occupants of the plane were rescued by a nearby yacht and did not suffer major injuries.
- On July 5, 1976, a Cessna 185 struck a cabin cruiser while taking off, injuring three passengers on the boat. The collision made a hole in the landing pontoon and the seaplane later sank after landing near Island Park.
- On July 5, 1976, a Cessna 185E crashed into a boat during takeoff. Although the aircraft suffered substantial damage, the pilot was uninjured.
- On July 23, 1985, a strut supporting the seaplane's pontoon snapped during landing. The pilot and five passengers were unhurt and rescued by a nearby boat. The pilot suspected that the damage might have been caused by metal fatigue.
- On July 12, 1998, a twin-engine seaplane flipped over after landing near East 29th Street and became submerged in the river. The pilot and two passengers escaped from the plane's emergency windows and were rescued by the police. One of the passengers was businessman and entrepreneur Neil Hirsch.
- On July 21, 2017, a Cessna 208 aborted takeoff due to mechanical failure and damaged a pontoon in a hard river landing. The pilot and nine passengers were rescued by a police vessel. One of the passengers was TV producer Bill Lawrence.
- On July 5, 2026, a Kodiak 100 struck a wave when landing, snapping a strut supporting a pontoon. There were no serious injuries to both pilots and the six passengers, which were rescued from the partially capsized seaplane by nearby police and fire department vessels that arrived within 90 seconds of the incident.

== See also ==
- List of airports in New York
