= United States Post Office–South Norwalk Main =

- US Post Office–South Norwalk Main
- U.S. National Register of Historic Places
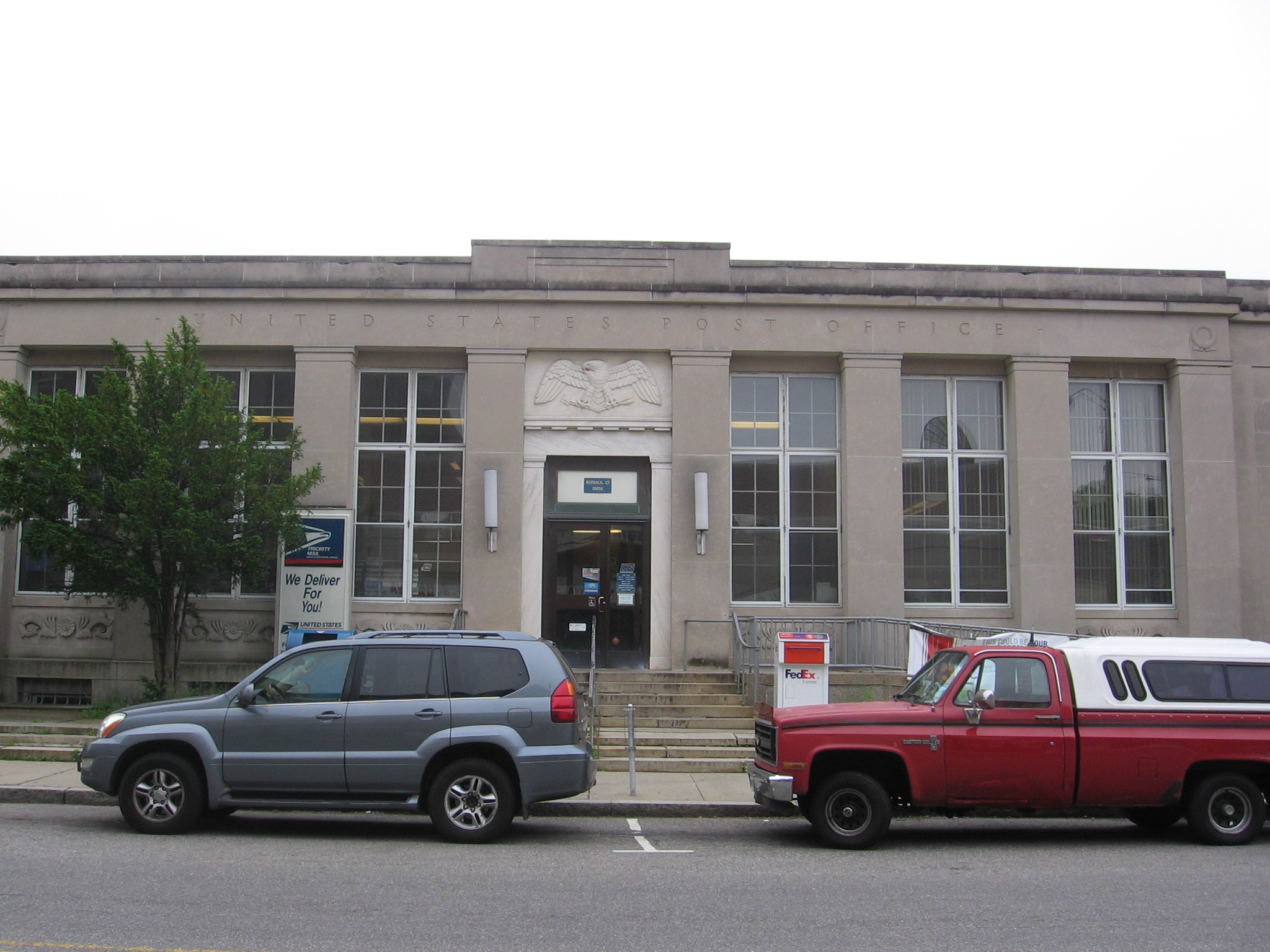
- View of main entrance on Washington Street, May 24, 2012

- Location within Connecticut Location within the United States
- Location: 16 Washington Street, Norwalk, Connecticut
- Coordinates: 41°5′56″N 73°25′17″W
- Area: 1.3 acres (0.53 ha)
- Built: 1936
- Architect: Thomas Harlan Ellett; Louis A. Simon
- Architectural style: Classical Revival, Late Classical Revival
- NRHP reference No.: 86000126
- Added to NRHP: January 21, 1986

The US Post Office–South Norwalk Main, also known as Norwalk Main Post Office, is located at 16 Washington Street in Norwalk, Connecticut. It is a single story steel and concrete structure, faced in limestone. It was designed in 1936 and built in 1937, and is an example of what has been termed "starved classicism". Its lobby areas are decorated by murals by Kindred McLeary, commissioned by the Treasury Department's Section of Painting and Sculpture.

The building was listed on the National Register of Historic Places in 1986.

== See also ==
- National Register of Historic Places listings in Fairfield County, Connecticut
- List of United States post offices
