= East River VFR corridor =

Section of airspace above the East River in New York City

Coordinates: 40°44′N 73°58′W

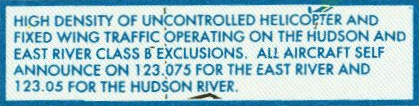
Hudson and East River VFR corridor note on New York terminal area chart as of 2007

The East River Special Flight Rules Area (SFRA), formally known as the East River class-B exclusion, is a section of airspace above the East River in New York City in which flight is permitted under visual flight rules (VFR). Formerly, this could be done without being in contact with air traffic control. Pilots operating within the SFRA are expected to self-announce on a designated frequency of 123.075 MHz, and to maintain appropriate separation visually.

After a 2006 plane crash near the corridor, the FAA imposed a temporary flight restriction (TFR) requiring all pilots of fixed-wing aircraft to obtain permission from LaGuardia's air traffic control tower for flight in the East River VFR corridor between the southern tip of Governors Island and the northern tip of Roosevelt Island. The pilot must remain in contact with air traffic control while in the exclusion. An exception is granted for seaplanes landing or departing from the New York Skyports Seaplane Base located in the East River near 23rd Street. Technically, this area remains a VFR corridor and outside of Class B airspace. However, the TFR imposes many of the requirements of entering Class B airspace. Significantly, cloud clearance and visibility requirements are not changed.

The rule is among many regulating aviation in the New York metropolitan area, which also includes the Hudson River SFRA. A major difference between the East River VFR and Hudson River SFRA's are that the latter route allows VFR flight along the entire length of Manhattan, whereas the East River corridor ends southwest of LaGuardia Airport. For this reason, helicopter traffic in the East River SFRA is the norm, and fixed-wing pilots tend to avoid it, as it requires a very tight turn-around in order to avoid continuing flight into the LaGuardia airspace.
