= Wall Street Skyport =

Former seaplane base in Manhattan, New York

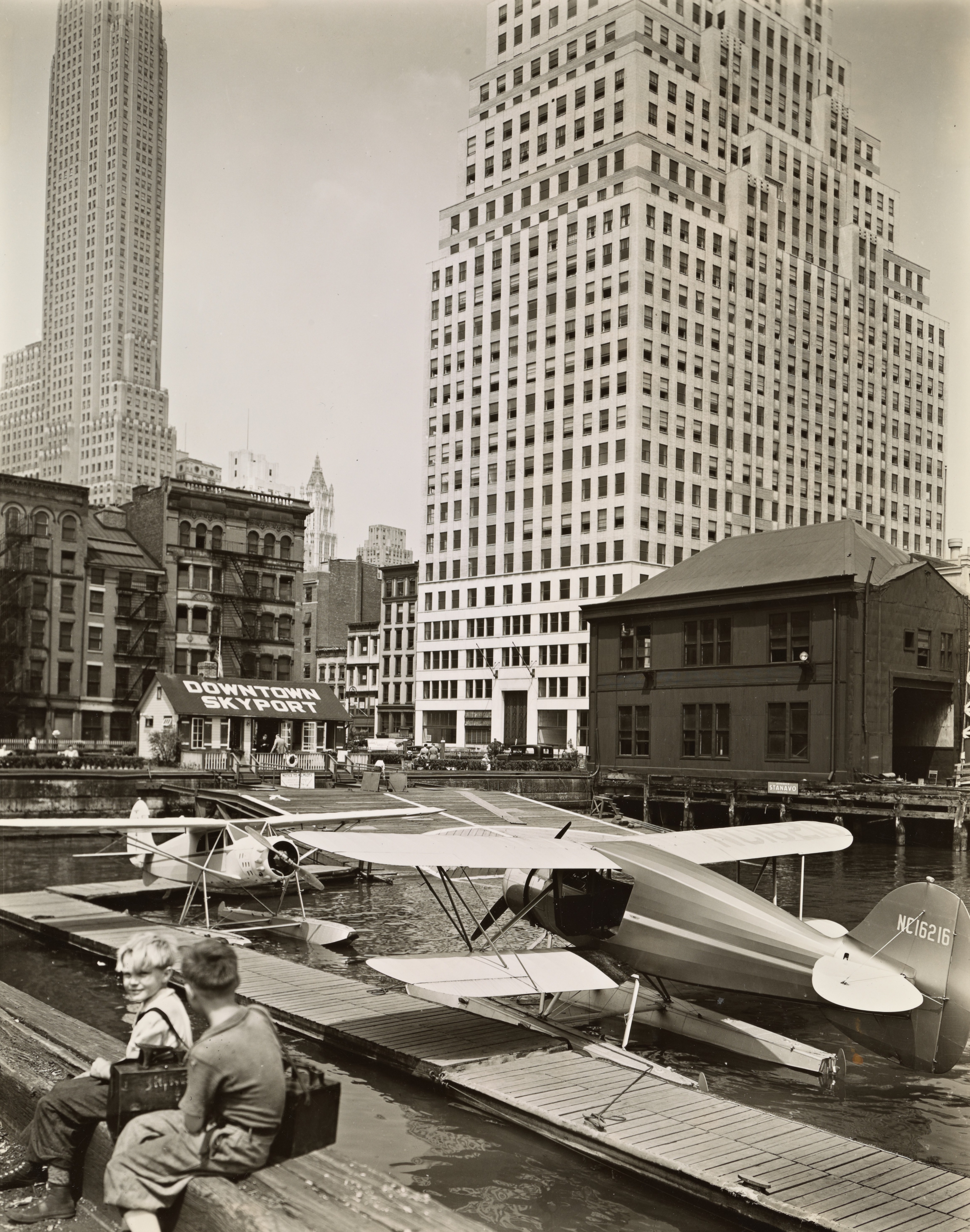
- Downtown Skyport in August 1936
- IATA: none; ICAO: none

Summary
- Location: New York City
- Opened: September 5, 1934
- Closed: mid-1980s
- Elevation AMSL: 0 ft (0 m)
- Coordinates: 40°42′14″N 74°0′22″W

Map
- Interactive map of Wall Street Skyport

Wall Street Skyport, also known as Downtown Skyport and later as Wall Street Seaplane Base, was a seaplane base in New York City, located on the East River near the foot of Wall Street adjacent to Pier 11. Opened in 1934, the facility was primarily used by suburban commuters working in the Financial District of Lower Manhattan. The seaplane base operated until the mid-1980s.

== History ==
=== Opening and early years ===
In the 1930s, one of Mayor Fiorello La Guardia's efforts to promote aviation in New York City involved the construction of two city-owned seaplane bases, located on the East River at the ends of Wall Street and East 31st Street, which were called the Downtown Skyport and Midtown Skyport, respectively. Their purpose was to facilitate the use of seaplanes by private owners, provide seaplane commuting services to suburban areas, and encourage airlines to provide direct service to Manhattan. An air taxi service was also planned between the seaplane bases in Manhattan and Floyd Bennett Field in Brooklyn, which opened in 1930 as the city's first municipal airport.

Each of the new seaplane bases on the East River had a 86-by-56-foot (26 by 17 m) floating ramp that was constructed at the Brooklyn Navy Yard using Federal Emergency Relief Administration funds. The floating ramp included a 45-foot (14 m) diameter turntable that allowed planes to taxi from the water onto the partially submerged end of the turntable and be rotated 180 degrees so the rear of the plane moved out of the water, allowing passengers to quickly load and unload before the aircraft returned to the water for takeoff. The entire process could be done in less than 40 seconds. By using the turntable, seaplanes did not have to spend extra time tying up to a dock or using a boat to transport passengers to and from the shore. The aquatic turntable was similar to one used at the seaplane terminal in Jersey City that opened in 1933 and was one of the first such turntables in the United States.

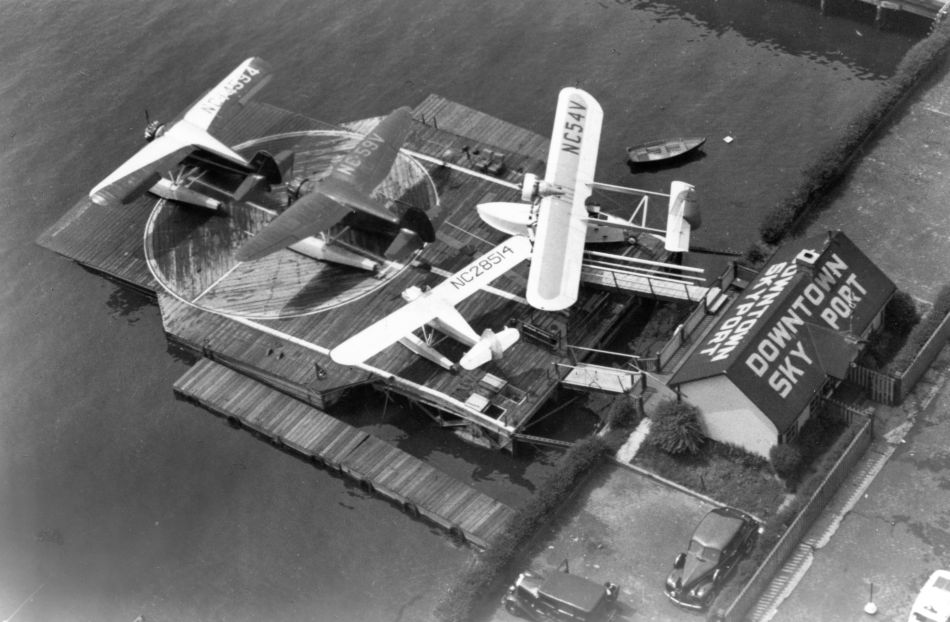
Downtown Skyport in the 1940s, showing the floating ramp and turntable

The floating ramp and turntable for the Downtown Skyport took two and a half months to construct. It was launched from the Brooklyn Navy Yard on August 15, 1934, and christened with a bottle of champagne as "Wall Street Skyport." The dock was transported to its permanent location in Lower Manhattan and officially opened with a dedication ceremony on September 5, 1934. Other facilities at Wall Street Skyport included a waiting room, fueling station, and parking for about 20 planes along a mooring boom.

Before the new seaplane base had officially opened, the first commuter seaplane service was started in July 1934 by New York and Suburban Airlines, Inc., which operated a 12-passenger Bellanca Airbus, providing daily trips between Port Washington, Glen Cove and Oyster Bay on Long Island and the seaplane bases being established at Wall Street and East 31st Street. In 1935, Marine Air Transport Company operated a commuter service used by half a dozen passengers traveling between Glen Cove and Wall Street Skyport, but the service was abandoned after five months when the commuters decided to purchase their own seaplanes to travel to and from work.

Works Progress Administration poster showcasing the municipal airports in New York City, ca. 1937

The East River seaplane base at Wall Street—along with the other seaplane base at East 31st Street, Floyd Bennett Field, and North Beach Airport—were included in a poster promoting New York City's municipal airports that was developed around 1937 for the Federal Art Project sponsored by the Works Progress Administration.

By 1940, the skyport was handling about 15–25 daily commuters during good weather, mostly in Grumman G-21, Fairchild 24, and Sikorsky S-39 seaplanes. Many of the regular passengers included Wall Street businessmen who owned their planes and had full-time pilots. While the cost of having a private seaplane was expensive, some executives found cost savings over their prior use of commuter yachts from their estates on the North Shore of Long Island. During the middle of the day, the seaplane bases along the East River also accommodated trips made by the wives of commuters, who came to Manhattan on private seaplanes for shopping excursions.

=== Late 20th century ===
By 1967, the facility was known as Wall Street Seaplane Base and was still being used by about 30 daily commuters during good weather from the spring until the fall (there was not enough light for commuter planes to safely take off during the winter months when sunset occurs earlier in the day). Most of the aircraft using the base were single-engine Cessnas and the turntable that had been originally used to turn heavier seaplanes had been removed. During the summer, the seaplane base was also used to shuttle passengers making weekend getaways to Fire Island and The Hamptons.

In July 1972, Downtown Airlines began operating scheduled seaplane service between Wall Street and Penn's Landing on the Delaware River in Philadelphia. For its Manhattan terminal, the airline used a new floating dock that was located near the former site of Pier 8 (to the north of the Downtown Manhattan Heliport). The following year, Downtown Airlines replaced its six-passenger Piper Aztecs with larger DeHavilland Twin Otters that could carry 20 passengers and also provide more reliability by flying in poor weather and taking off in rougher water. Service from Wall Street to the Anacostia River in Washington, D.C. by Downtown Airlines began in 1974, but the airline went out of business later that year. Seaplane service between Wall Street and downtown Philadelphia was revived by Seaplane Shuttle Transport from 1976 to 1977, which offered lower airfares designed to compete with Amtrak's Metroliner service. Although the seaplane service was breaking even, it was discontinued because it was not showing signs of returning a large profit in the long-term.

For a six-month period in the beginning of 1983, Wall Street Seaplane Base temporarily accommodated all of the seaplane operations in Manhattan when the city refused to renew a permit for the New York Skyports Seaplane Base at East 23rd Street over noise complaints and safety concerns. By 1986, Wall Street Seaplane Base had closed and the seaplane base at East 23rd Street was the only seaplane facility operating in Manhattan.

=== Other uses ===
On April 12, 1949, Stanley Hiller Jr. landed at Wall Street Skyport in a Hiller 360, completing the first coast-to-coast flight for a civilian helicopter. His journey began on January 24, 1949, at his company's plant in Palo Alto, California, and stopped at over 30 cities along the way across the United States. A dedicated landing site for helicopters in Lower Manhattan was later established with the opening of the Downtown Manhattan Heliport in 1960.

Before the ferry terminal at Pier 11 opened in the mid-1980s, the seaplane base also accommodated some attempts at establishing new ferry services serving the Wall Street area, including hydrofoil service to East 90th Street in Yorkville and hovercraft service to Huntington via the Long Island Sound and Nyack via the Hudson River.

== Accidents and incidents ==
- On July 22, 1968, a Cessna 185 flipped over as it was about to take off and was swamped by the wake of a passing boat. The pilot and four passengers were not injured and were rescued by the police. The probable cause of the accident was determined to be improper compensation for wind conditions.
- On September 14, 1981, a Cessna 206 encountered turbulent waters upon landing, causing a strut to fail and the propeller to hit a pontoon. The damaged pontoon took on water and the seaplane partially sank in the river. The pilot and two passengers were uninjured and were rescued by the police.
- On July 22, 1983, a Cessna 206 preparing to land had a midair collision with a police helicopter that was monitoring traffic conditions near the toll plaza of the Brooklyn–Battery Tunnel. The helicopter crashed into a garage in Red Hook, killing both of its occupants, while the seaplane did a nosedive into Buttermilk Channel. Two passengers seated in the rear of the seaplane managed to escape from the aircraft when it was partially submerged and were rescued by nearby boats. The pilot and passenger in the front seat were injured and drowned when the plane sank. The probable cause of the accident was found to be inadequate visual lookout by both of the pilots.
