= Miami Seaplane Base =

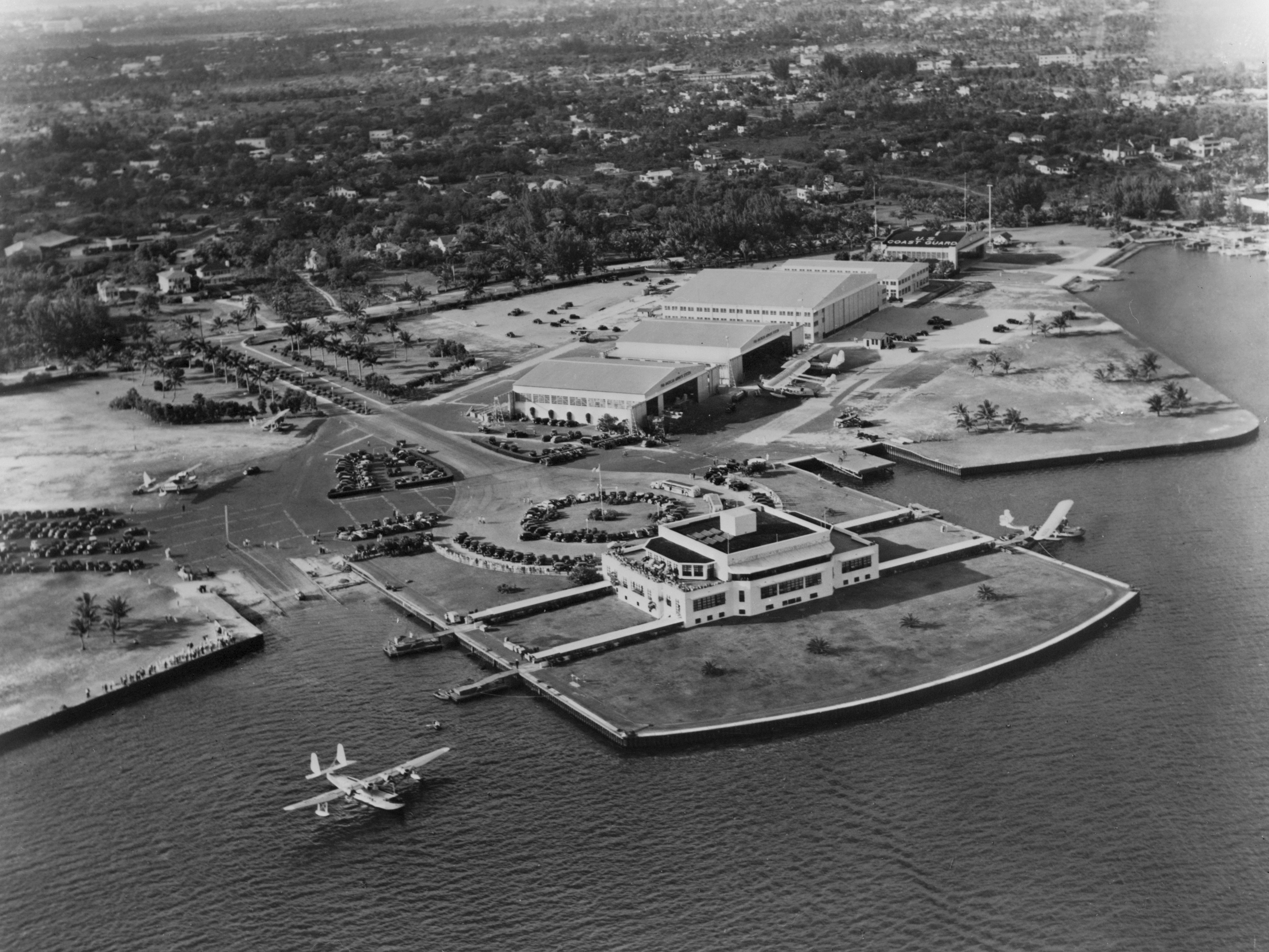
- The airport in 30s
- IATA: MPB; ICAO: none; FAA LID: X44

Summary
- Airport type: Public use
- Owner: City of Miami, Florida
- Operator: Chalks Airline, Inc.
- Serves: Miami, Florida
- Location: Miami-Dade County, Florida
- Elevation AMSL: 0 ft / 0 m
- Coordinates: 25°46′42″N 080°10′13″W
- Website: www.miamiseaplanebase.com
- Interactive map of Miami Seaplane Base

Runways
| Direction | Length | | Surface |
| Direction | ft | m | Surface |
|---|---|---|---|
| NW/SE | 15,000 | 4,572 | Water |

Statistics (1926)
- Aircraft operations: 1,950
- Based aircraft: 1
- Source: Federal Aviation Administration

Miami Seaplane Base (IATA: MPB, FAA LID: X44) is a public-use seaplane base located 2 miles (3.2 km) east of the central business district of Miami on Watson Island in Miami-Dade County, Florida, United States.

== History ==
In 1926, Chalk's International Airlines built an air terminal on a landfill island, Watson Island, where it continued to operate for over 75 years. Its scheduled and other flights by flying boats and amphibian aircraft served many points in the Bahamas and other nearby destinations.

Chalk's moved its flights to its main engineering and operating base at Fort Lauderdale-Hollywood International Airport after the attacks of September 11, 2001, because of security concerns around PortMiami and increased helicopter traffic around Watson Island. Chalk's ceased operations in December 2005.

The Seaplane Base is utilized by many operators throughout the year for flights within Florida and to The Bahamas.

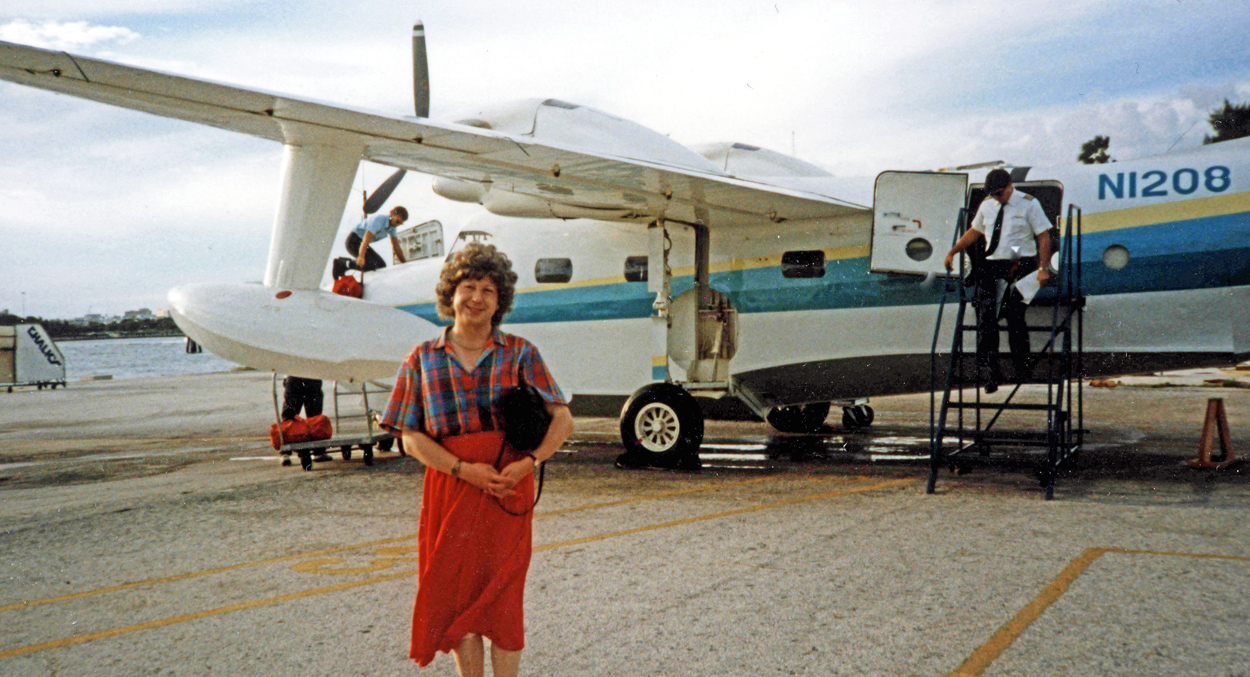
Grumman Mallard amphibian of Chalks Airlines at the seaplane base in 1989 after arrival from the Bahamas

== Airlines and destinations ==
=== Scheduled service ===
| Airlines | Destinations |
|---|---|
| Tropic Ocean Airways | North Bimini |

=== Charter operators ===
| Airline | Operating region |
|---|---|
| Tropic Ocean Airways | The Bahamas, Florida |
| Fly The Whale | The Bahamas, Florida |
| Miami Seaplane Tours | Florida |

== Accidents and incidents ==
On July 1, 2018, a Tropic Ocean Airways Cessna 185 crashed on landing into the Miami Seaplane base when the aircraft nosed over into the water. The amphibious airplane sustained substantial damage to the right wing lift strut, empennage, right wing aileron, rudder, and elevator. The pilot was the sole occupant of the aircraft and sustained minor injuries, which was attributed to the pilot's failure to use the before landing checklist.

== See also ==
- List of airports in Florida
