= Tropic Ocean Airways =

Seaplane charter and scheduled service airline

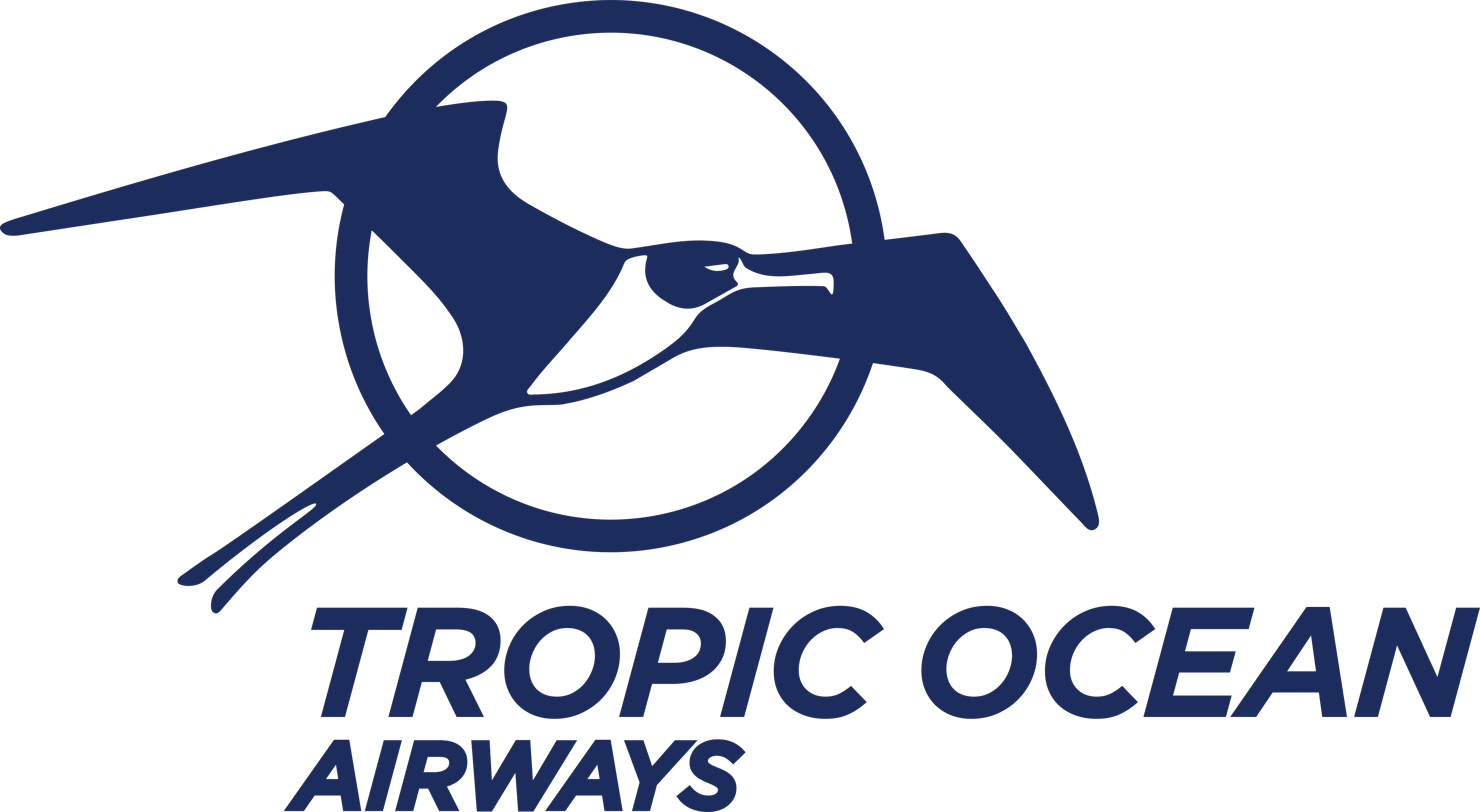

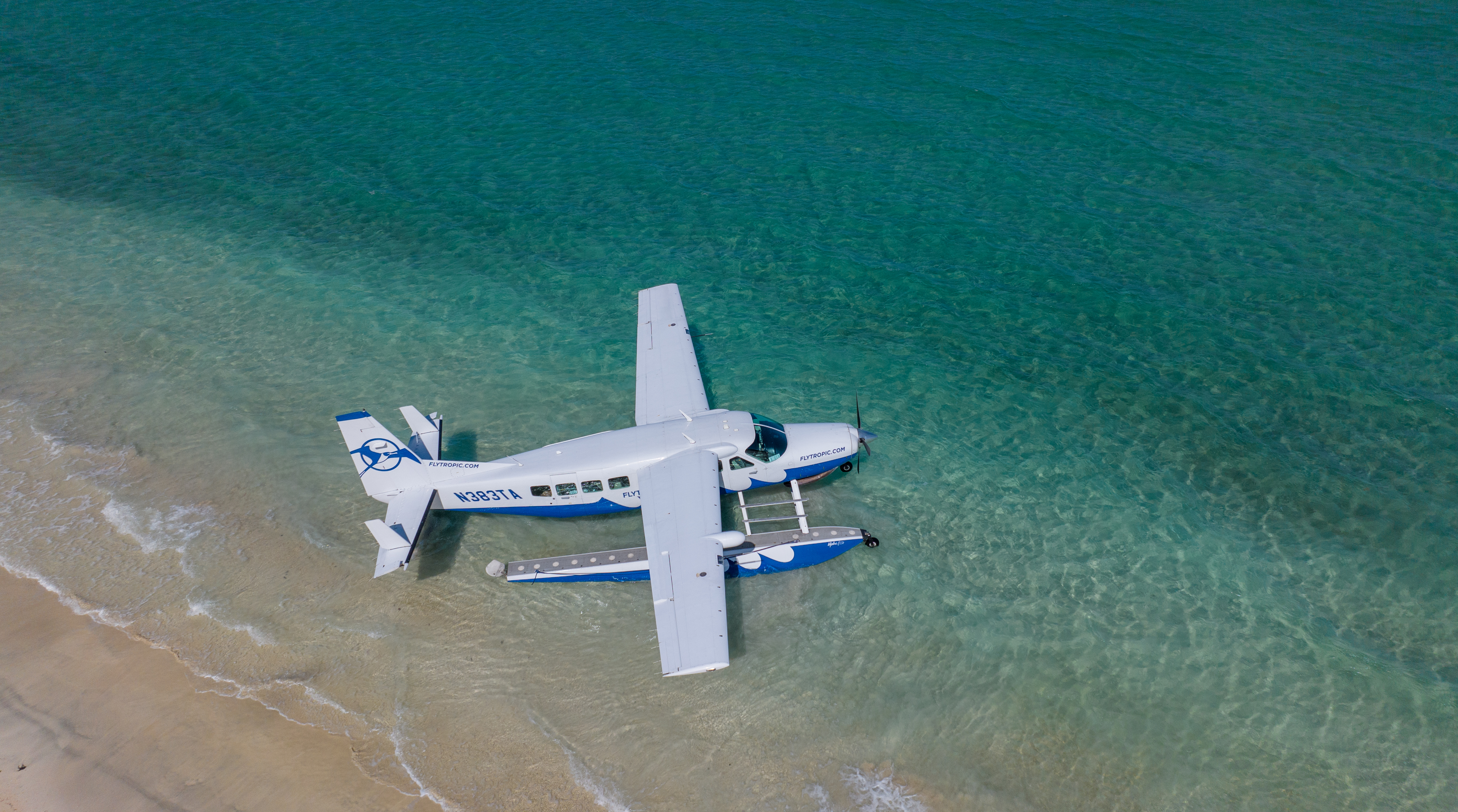
- Tropic Ocean Airways Seaplane docked from a water landing in the Bahamas.
IATA	ICAO	Call sign
TI	FTO	Wagner
- Founded: 2009
- Commenced operations: 2011
- Operating bases: Fort Lauderdale International Airport; New York Skyports Inc. Seaplane Base – summer only; Miami Seaplane Base
- Fleet size: 14
- Destinations: 3 + charter
- Headquarters: Fort Lauderdale, Florida
- Website: flytropic.com

Tropic Ocean Airways is a seaplane charter and scheduled service airline based in Fort Lauderdale, Florida, United States. Tropic Ocean Airways operates several Cessna airframes on floats.

== Services ==
Tropic Ocean Airways operates scheduled and charter seaplane services throughout the Bahamas and Florida. Tropic Ocean Airways also operates provisioning services to vessels at sea. During the summer season, Tropic Ocean Airways operates scheduled services for Blade and charter services out of New York Skyports Inc. Seaplane Base.

=== Bahamas and Florida ===
Tropic Ocean Airways flies several scheduled and charter services year round, out of Fort Lauderdale International Airport and Miami Seaplane Base. Scheduled flights are available to four locations in the Bahamas. Tropic Ocean Airways additionally offers seaplane charter flights, and vessel provisioning services for ships at sea.

=== Northeastern US ===
During the summer season, Tropic Ocean Airways operates Cessna Seaplanes from New York Seaplane Base to several charter destinations in the region.

== Destinations ==
=== Current scheduled service ===
Departure airport	Arrival airports
Fort Lauderdale–Hollywood International Airport	Andros Town International Airport, Great Harbour Cay Airport, South Bimini Airport
Miami Seaplane Base	North Bimini Airport

=== Current charter service regions ===
- The Bahamas
- Florida
- Northeastern United States - seasonal (summer) scheduled flights operated for Blade

== Fleet ==
As of May 2023, Tropic Ocean Airways operates the following aircraft.

Type	Fleet	Passengers
Cessna 206 Amphibian	1	5
Cessna Grand Caravan Wheeled	1	8
Cessna Caravan EX Wheeled	1	8
Cessna Grand Caravan Amphibian	1	8
Cessna Caravan EX Amphibian	10	8
