= North Bimini Airport =

Airport in The Bahamas

- IATA: NSB; ICAO: none

Summary
- Location: North Bimini, Bahamas
- Elevation AMSL: 0 ft (0 m)
- Coordinates: 25°46′01″N 079°15′00″W

Map
- Location in The Bahamas

Runways
Direction	Length		Surface
Direction	m	ft	Surface
	3,661	12,011	Water

North Bimini Airport is a seaplane base in North Bimini on Bimini in The Bahamas.

In 2016, Cape Air began scheduled service to North Bimini from South Florida to feed Resorts World Bimini's hotel operation. North Bimini is currently served by Tropic Ocean Airways with three daily round trip flights from the Sheltair Terminal at Fort Lauderdale Hollywood International Airport.

== Airlines and destinations ==
Airlines	Destinations
Tropic Ocean Airways	Fort Lauderdale, Miami Seaplane Base
