= Paris pneumatic post =

Pneumatic tube messaging service

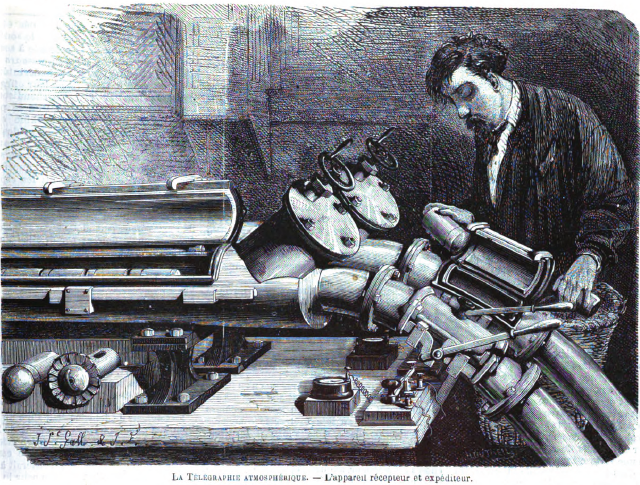
A message container being inserted into the network in 1873

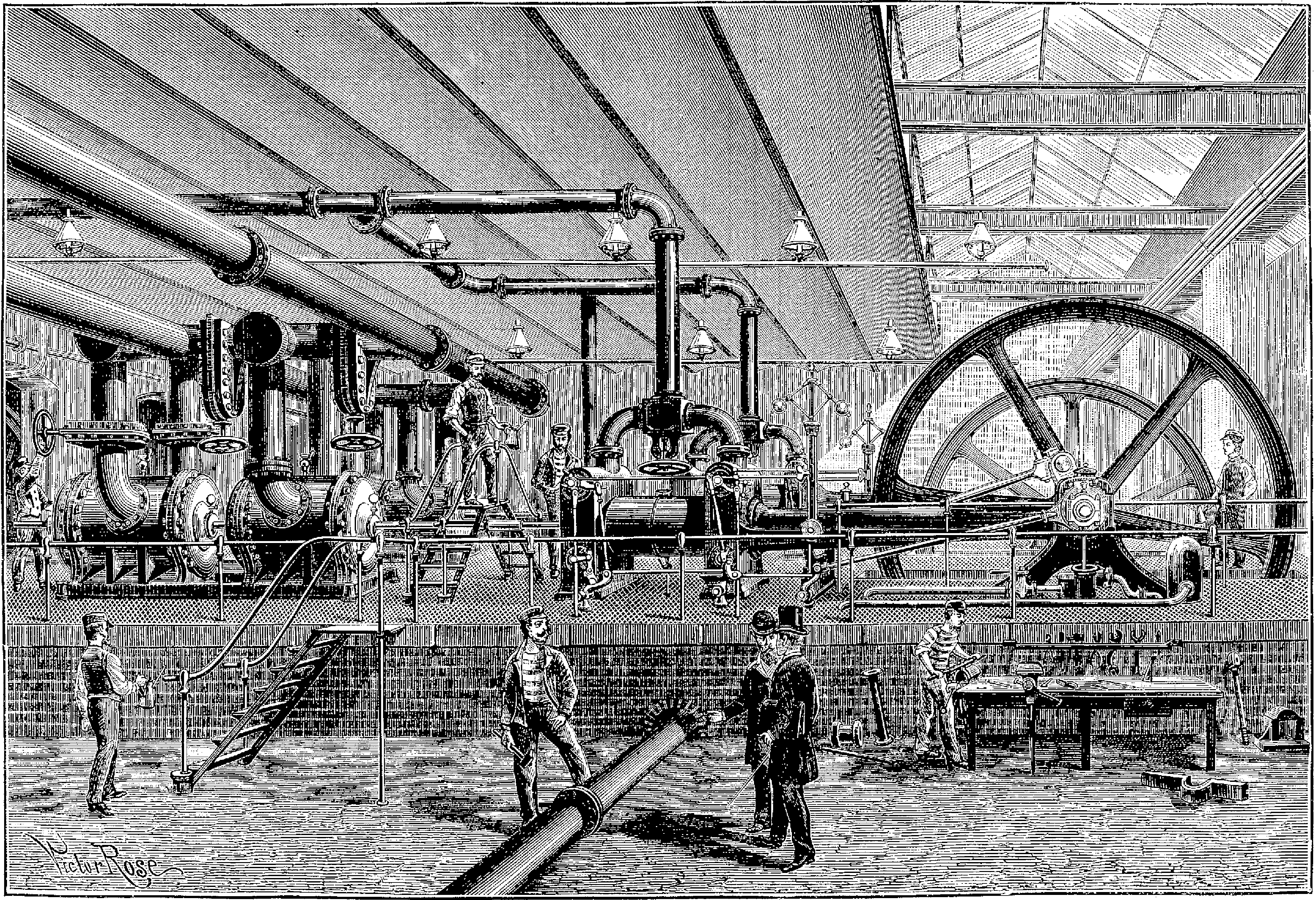
The network's steam-driven compressors and vacuum pumps, 1891

The Paris pneumatic post was a pneumatic tube message-carrying service that operated in the French capital from 1866 through 1984. It was established because of the popularity of the electric telegraph in the city which had led to the signal cables becoming overloaded and messages being sent by road. The pneumatic system allowed the telegraph companies to send messages underground through sealed lines laid in the Paris sewers, bypassing any traffic on the roads above. The network was taken into public ownership in 1879, under the Ministry of Posts and Telegraphs, and opened to messages sent by the general public. Messages continued to be considered officially as telegrams and for a fixed cost users could write a message on a "petit bleu" form to be sent anywhere in the city. After arriving at the office nearest the recipient it would be taken to their address by a courier.

Originally driven by steam-powered vacuum pumps and compressors the network was modernised to electricity-driven machinery from 1927. The Paris pneumatic post reached its greatest extent in 1934 with 427 kilometres (265 mi) of pneumatic pipes and 130 offices in service. The number of messages sent peaked in 1945 at 30 million. Budget restrictions from 1945 hampered the network as maintenance and upgrades were cut. With declining usage the network was closed in 1984. A parallel system operated for official purposes and connected several government buildings. Part of this network, connecting the senate, national assembly and the Journal Officiel de la République Française, survived in use until 2004.

== History ==
=== Beginnings ===
Extent of the pneumatic post in 1868

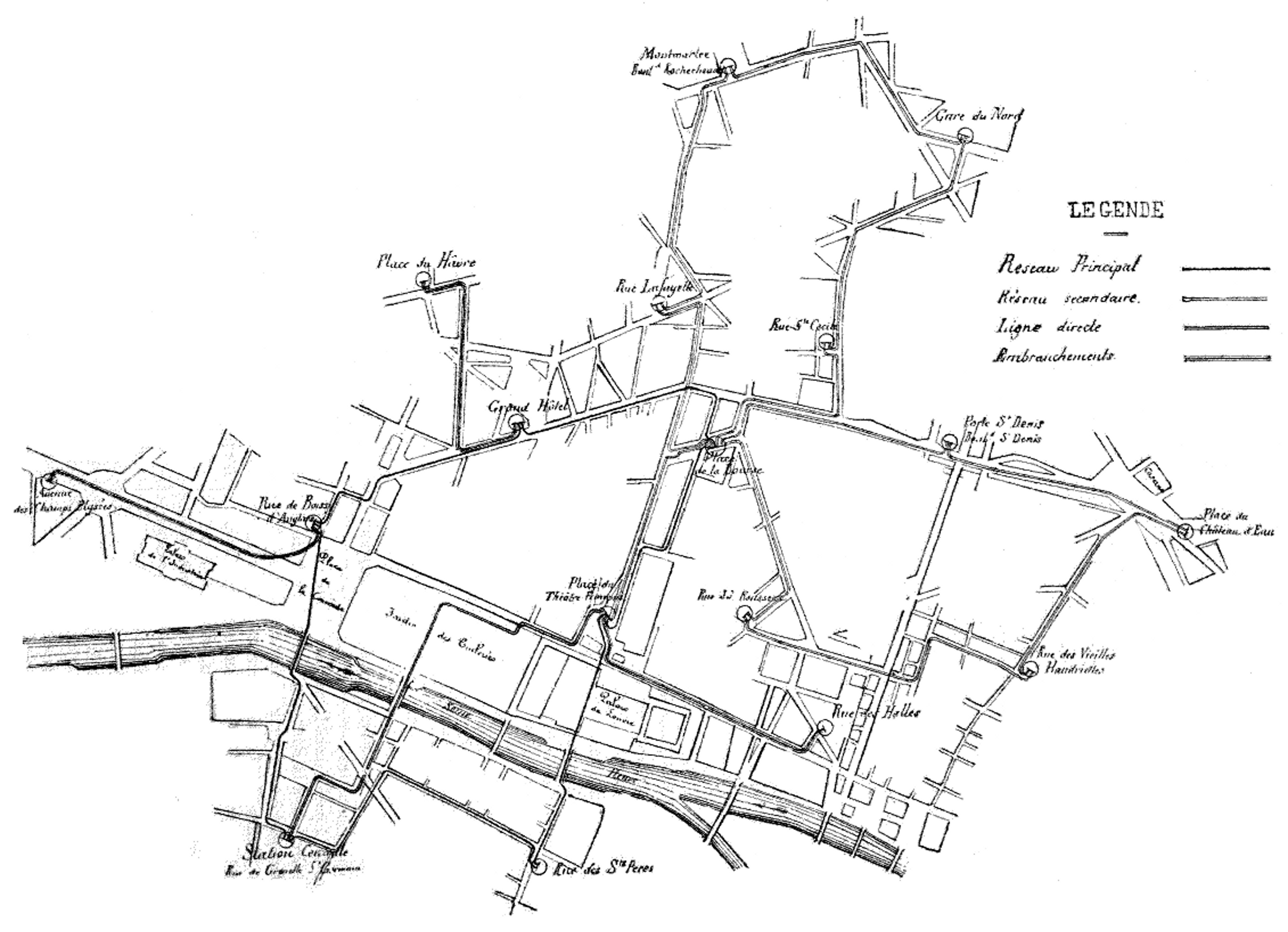
Extent of the network in 1873, showing additional spurs and polygonal networks added onto the original core network

The use of electrical telegraphy in Paris rose rapidly in the period of the Second French Empire, from 17 stations in 1851 to 2,200 in 1867. The telegraph lines became overloaded and the operating companies had to resort to sending messages by carriage between the two major telegraph stations on the Rue de Grenelle and the Place de la Bourse, with messages sometimes delayed by road traffic. As early as 1853 a pneumatic tube message system was installed by Josiah Latimer Clark to link the London Stock Exchange with the offices of the Electric Telegraph Company. Tests of a pneumatic message-carrying system were made by Ambroise Ador in Paris's Parc Monceau in 1852 and further tests were made by Antoine Galy-Cazalat in 1854.

In December 1866 the first line of a pneumatic messaging service was installed between the offices of the Central Télégraphique in Rue Feydeau and Le Grand Hotel in Boulevard des Capucines, a distance of 1.05 kilometres (0.65 mi). The messages were carried in containers within a steel tube of 65 millimetres (2.6 in) diameter, buried 1 metre (3.3 ft) below ground. Messages from hotel guests were transported through the 1,060-metre (3,480 ft) long tube to the telegraph office from where they could be transmitted onwards. The air was compressed not by motorised means but by the pressure of 15 metres (49 ft) head of water held in reservoirs. A pressure of 2 standard atmospheres (200 kPa) was capable of being generated, which allowed a cylinder 5.5 inches (14 cm) long and carrying 40 messages to be transmitted in 60–80 seconds. A reservoir at either end of the line allowed for messages to be sent in both directions.

The Grand Hotel line was extended in 1867 to form a six station "hexagon" incorporating the telegraph offices at the Place de la Bourse and Rue de Grenelle. The other stations on the route were at the Place du Théâtre-Français, Rue des Saints-Pères and Rue Boissy-d'Anglas. This network utilised the same 65 millimetres (2.6 in) tubes of the Grand Hotel line and permitted curves of 5–20 metres (16–66 ft) radius. A "train" of message containers took 12 minutes to complete a full clockwise circuit of the network. The tubes were laid in the Paris sewers, reducing the need for new trenches and allowing ready access for repairs and maintenance.

In the following decades additional polygonal circuits were added to the original hexagon, doubling it in size by 1872 – though the circuits remained within the area of the Wall of the Ferme générale.

=== Opening to the public ===
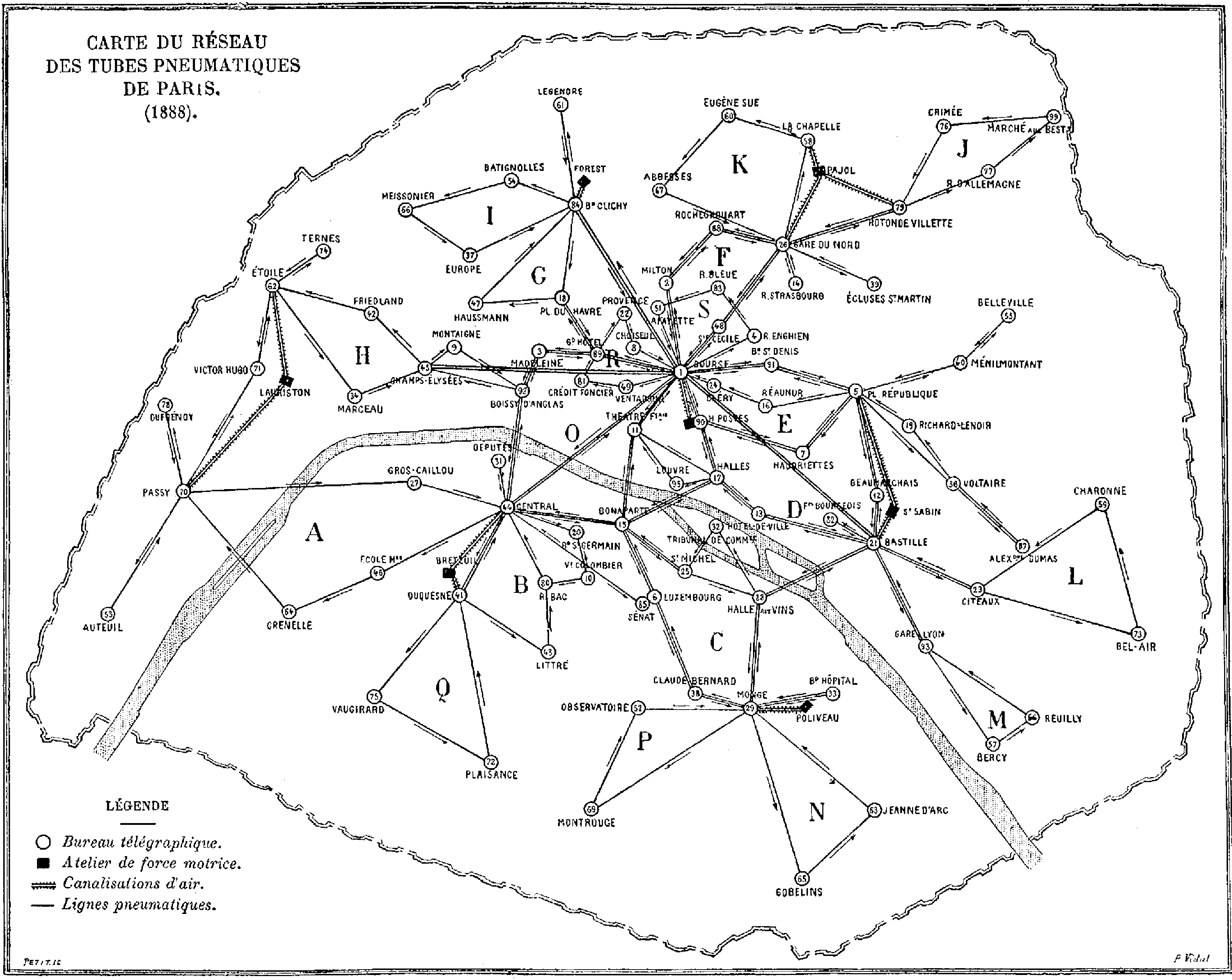
Extent of network in 1888 within the Wall of the Ferme générale

On 5 February 1879 the Ministry of Posts and Telegraphs was formed bringing together the two services, previously under the control of the Ministry of Finance and Ministry of the Interior respectively. The Ministry opened the use of the network to the public from 1 May that year. The technical aspects of the pneumatic post were maintained by the telegraphy department of the ministry while the operational aspects were under the post office department.

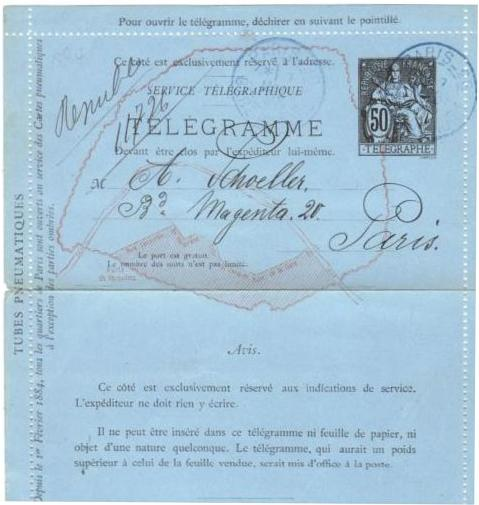
A pneumatic post petit bleu from 1884

Officially messages sent on the pneumatic network were considered to be telegrams. However, unlike telegrams the speed of transmission was not affected by the length of the message. In addition the cost to the user was not linked to length, except that each message had to be written on pre-franked forms, while telegrams were charged per word. The pneumatic message forms were known as "petits bleus" (small blues) for their size and colour. The forms were posted in small boxes attached to post boxes, left at telegraph counters or in special boxes at the rear of trams (which were emptied at the tram terminals). The network would carry the message to the station closest to the recipient from where it would be delivered by courier. The couriers, some as young as 14, delivered the messages by foot and cycle with mopeds being used from 1930. To pass between pneumatic networks the message was taken from its container, time stamped and inserted into the next tube. It was therefore possible to determine the route each message had taken by examining the time stamps.

In 1881 the decision was taken to extend coverage across the entire city by a four-phase expansion of the network. By February 1882 the 16th arrondissement and parts of the 17th and 18th were incorporated. By 1 April 1883 the remainder of the 17th and 18th arrondissements and part of the 19th were incorporated. By 1 February 1884 the remainder of the 19th arrondissement and the 12th and 20th were incorporated. By 15 December 1884 the rest of the city (15th, 13th, 14th arrondissements) were incorporated.

The pneumatic messages travelled at a speed of around 24 kilometres per hour (15 mph), driven by high and low air pressures provided by eight ateliers de force motrice (motive power workshops) including those at Breteuil, Forest, Valmy, Poliveau, Saint-Sabin, Lauriston and Pajol. Coverage was extended to parts of Seine and Seine-et-Oise in 1907 without extending the pneumatic network. Cycle couriers carried the messages to these suburbs from the existing stations.

=== Modernisation ===
The pneumatic network was extended to the suburbs for the first and only time in 1914 when an extension was made to Neuilly. Further extensions outside the city limits were planned but were cancelled with the outbreak of the First World War.

The network reached its greatest extent in 1934 with 427 kilometres (265 mi) of pneumatic pipes and 130 offices in service. On average around 10 million messages a year were delivered, peaking at 30 million in 1945. Complaints were made about smoke from the workshops and from 1926 flue gas scrubber devices were installed. These were expensive to run and maintain and so the workshops were converted to run on electricity from 1927. The first to be converted was Grenelle, which had a 30 horsepower (22 kW) electric motor installed. The workshops received 2-4 electric motors with a total average power at each station of 150 horsepower (110 kW). The motors drove compressors that forced air into the tubes and vacuum pumps that removed it.

Louis Gaillard, a recent graduate of the École Nationale Supérieure des Télécommunications, was placed in charge of the workshops in 1932. A few months later he was placed in charge of the entire network, a position he held until 1974. He became a driving force for the modernisation of the network. He ensured the continuation of the electrification programme, which completed in 1942 with the electrification of the Hôtel des Postes station. At completion the network had motors totalling 2,400 horsepower (1,800 kW), of which around 1,400 horsepower (1,000 kW) would be applied at any one time with the remaining units in reserve or maintenance. Gaillard also pioneered a system of automatic sorting of messages by address.

=== Decline ===
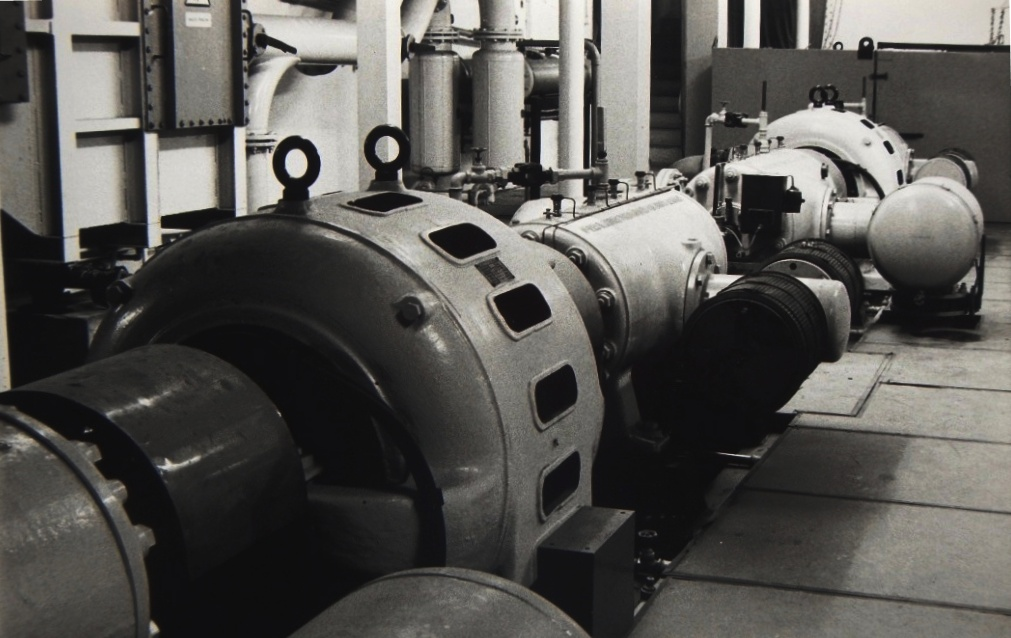
Compressor and vacuum units of the network, 1984

Budgetary restrictions in 1945 led to a slow down in the modernisation programme and a reduction in routine maintenance and upgrade work. By 1966 57% of the 80 millimetres (3.1 in) pneumatic tubes and 65% of the 65 millimetres (2.6 in) tubes were worn which led to an increase in blockages. In 1970 there were 270 blockages on the network that required workmen to enter the sewers to unblock the tubes. The price of a pneumatic message relative to a postal letter also increased from around 3:1 in 1902 to 5:1 in 1957 and 7.8:1 in 1975, reducing the popularity of the method. The increasing use of telephone and telex systems also reduced the attractiveness of the pneumatic message.

The use of the network declined to 4 million messages sent in 1960; 2.7 million in 1972 and just 648,000 in 1982. The original metal tubes were gradually replaced by PVC from 1965. This reduced the vulnerability of the network to oxidation and offered less resistance to the message containers, reducing noise. By 1970 there were 18 kilometres (11 mi) of PVC tubes in service.

The pneumatic network was closed by the Ministry of Posts and Telegraphs at 5 pm on 30 March 1984. The closure followed the introduction of two new services by the ministry: Postéclair, a public fax system, and Postexpress, a rapid parcel delivery network in Paris. Most employees of the pneumatic post were redeployed into Postexpress.

== Government network ==
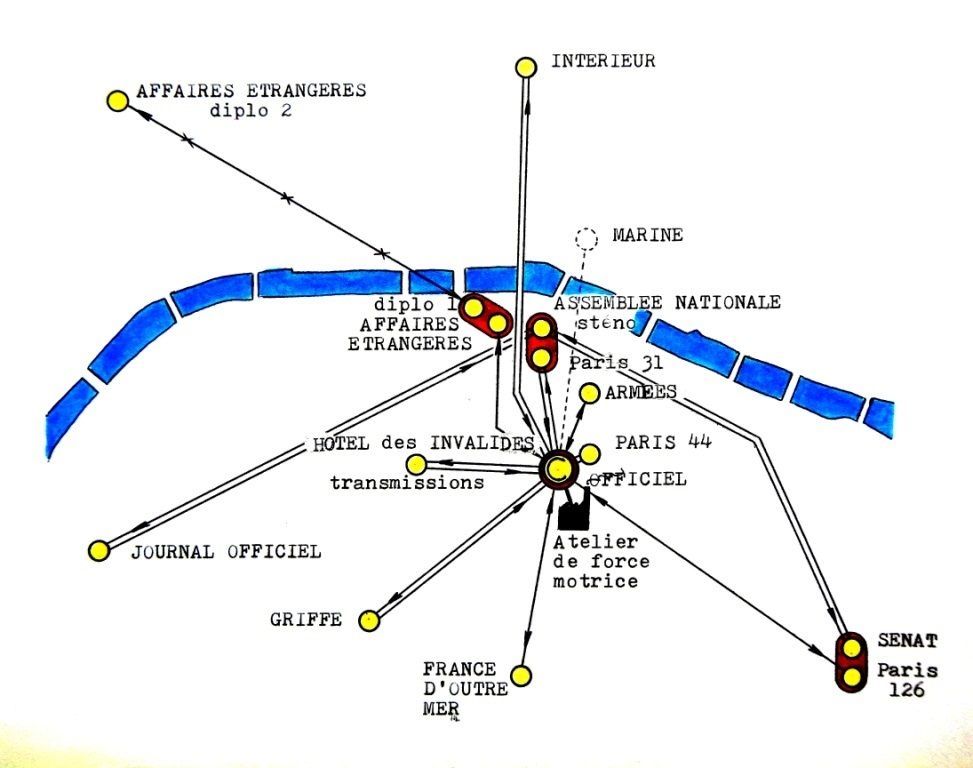
Layout of official government lines in 1967

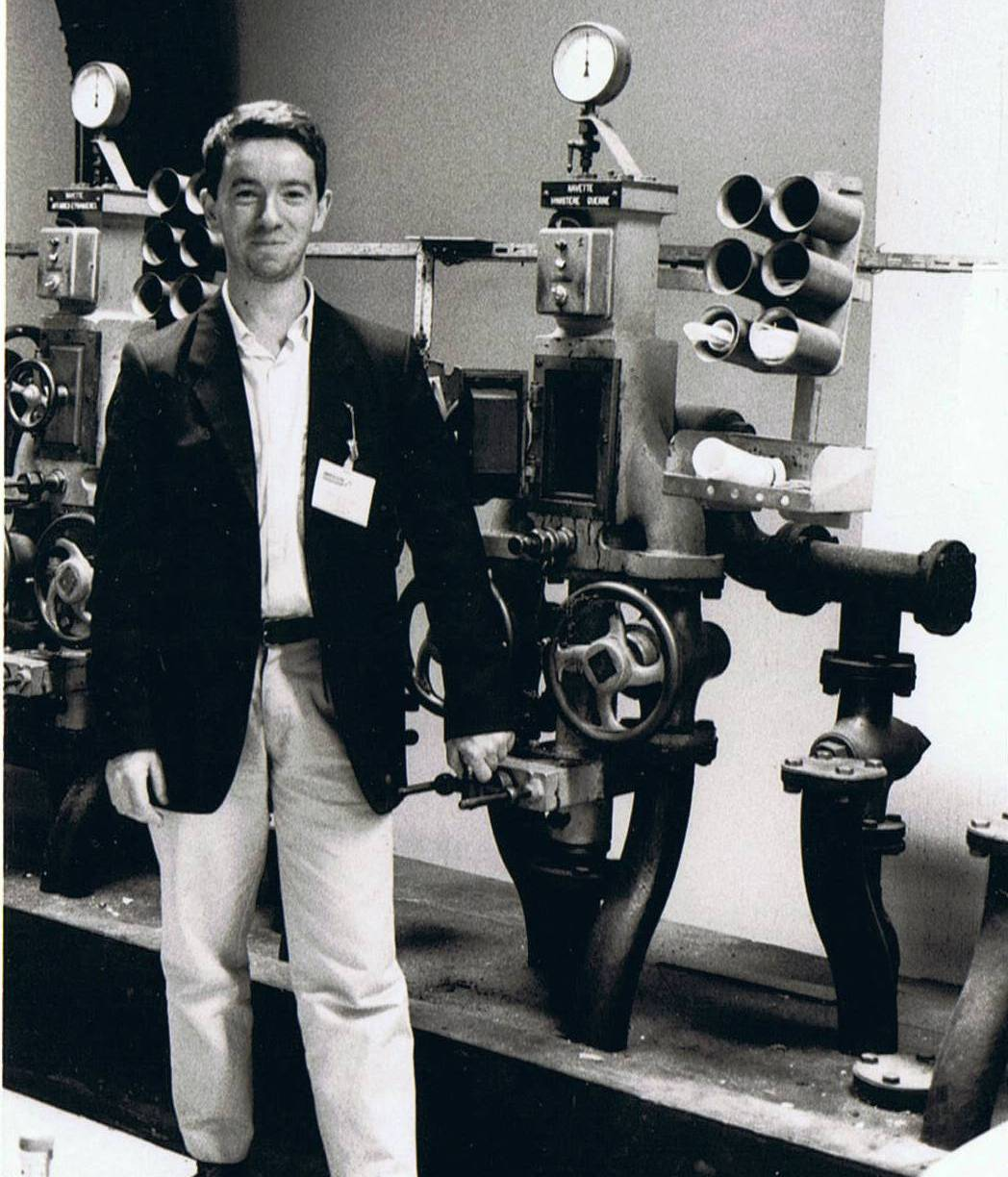
A message terminal of the government network at Paris-Central in 1987

A separate government network of pneumatic lines also existed and connected the Senate, National Assembly and the Journal Officiel de la République Française. This line was used to carry shorthand notes of parliamentary proceedings to the Journal where they were typed and sent back for review by the parliamentary stenographers. After approval the text was returned to the Journal for publication, the entire process taking around three days.

Other lines connected other government offices. The underground lines were valued for their security (no outside traffic was carried so the authenticity of each communication was assured) and ability to maintain communications if the streets were blocked by civil disturbance. However the network failed at a critical time in the debate of a Finance Bill in the 1940s or 50s, due to the flooding of the sewers. With the advent of fax and email communication the network was gradually dismantled, the dedicated route from the senate and national assembly to the Journal was the last to be decommissioned, being taken out of service in 2004.

== See also ==
- Pneumatic tube mail in New York City, similar system in New York City

== Bibliography ==
- Allaz, Camille (2013). Histoire de la poste dans le monde. Paris: Pygmalion. ISBN 9782756411545.
- Arlinghaus, Sandra L. (1986). Down the mail tubes : the pressured postal era, 1853–1984. Ann Arbor, Michigan: Michigan Document Services. p. 3. ISBN 1-877751-04-9.
- Bontemps, Charles (1873). "La Télégraphie Atmosphérique". La Nature – Revue des sciences. 1 (1–26): sc.
- Cermak, Anne-Laure. "La poste pneumatique, un système original d'acheminement rapide du courrier : l'exemple du réseau de Paris des origines à sa suppression, 1866–1984" (PDF). La Poste.
- Charbon, Paul (1998). "Aux couleurs de la Poste". Les cahiers de médiologie. 5 (1): 129. doi:10.3917/cdm.005.0129.
- Chauvigny, Pierre (1988). "5: La poste pneumatique". Les grands moments de la poste (in French). FeniXX réédition numérique. ISBN 978-2-402-24851-8.
- De Beaune, Sophie; Hilaire Pérez, Liliane (2015). "Le tube comme aiguillon". Artefact. Hors-série No 1: techniques, histoire et sciences humaines. Paris. ISBN 978-2-271-08507-8.
- Figuier, Louis (1891). "Supplément au Télegraphe Aérien". Les Merveilles de la Science Ou Description Populaire des Inventions Modernes. 1. Furne, Jouvet et Cie: 490–522.
- Gilles, Thomas (2015). Catacombes. Histoire du Paris souterrain (in French). Passage. ISBN 978-2-84742-251-1.
- Hayhurst, J.D. (1974). "The Pneumatic Post of Paris". The France & Colonies Philatelic Society of Great Britain. Archived from the original on 2002-02-03.
- "La poste ou l'histoire des communications 3/4". France Culture (in French). 5 December 2012.
- Le Briand, Elisa; Cermak, Anne-Laure (2006). Le réseau avant l'heure : la Poste pneumatique à Paris (1866–1984). Paris: Comité pour l'Histoire de la Poste. ISBN 2-9514515-7-1.
- Noisette, Perline; Vernet, Aurélien (28 February 2013). "La véritable navette du Sénat" (in French).
- Poujol, Thierry (1989). "Des égouts au musée, splendeur et déclin de la poste atmosphérique". Technique (19): 143–149. Archived from the original (PDF) on 2019-04-07.
- Royal Society for the Encouragement of Arts, Manufactures and Commerce (1867). Journal of the Society of Arts: Volume XV. London: Bell and Daldy.
- "Sciences". Science. 31 March 1867.
- Standage, Tom (1999). "Steam Powered Messages". The Victorian Internet : the remarkable story of the telegraph and the nineteenth century's online pioneers. London: Phoenix. ISBN 0-7538-0703-3.
- Ternant, Alcide-Ludovic (1881). Les télégraphes. Hachette et Cie. pp. 66–102.
