= Kindred McLeary =

American architect

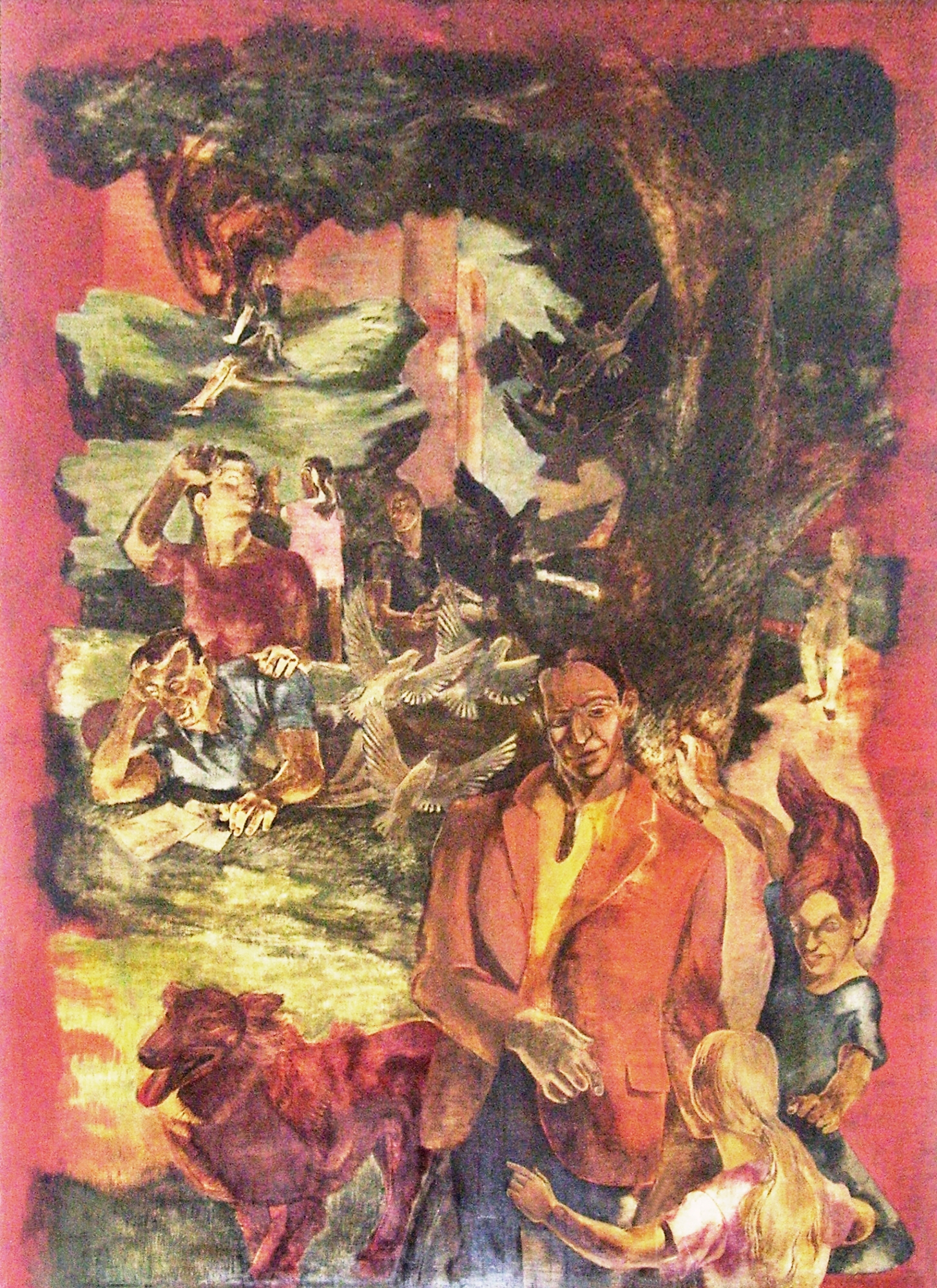
Madison Square Station USPO west mural

Kindred McLeary (December 3, 1901, Weimar, Texas – May 29, 1949) was an American architect, artist and educator.

== Education ==
Kindred McLeary studied architecture at the University of Texas and earned his degree in 1927. While teaching at the University of Texas the following year, McLeary entered one of his paintings, Cotton, in a national art exhibit at the Witte Memorial Museum in San Antonio. The painting portrayed an African-American woman reclining in a field of cotton with several men standing around her, one of them strumming a guitar. Some artists and ministers attacked the picture as obscene, but the art curator of the museum defended it and kept it hanging throughout the exhibit, despite the controversy.

== Career ==
McLeary began teaching architecture at Carnegie Tech in the autumn of 1928. McLeary was also a noted muralist. His best-known mural, Defense of Human Freedoms (1942), sometimes referred to as America the Mighty, dominates the 21st Street, N.W. lobby of the Harry S. Truman Building of the U.S. Department of State. When the mural was created in 1941–42, the building was planned for the use of the U.S. War Department, which moved into the newly built Pentagon in 1947, leaving the War Department structure with the mural to the Department of State.

The mural is a depiction of the chaos of war and the enduring efforts of humanity to preserve freedom and civilization. It was covered over with plywood and drapery in 1954 and restored in 2010 for the debut of the George C. Marshall Conference Center inside the building. McLeary also painted murals in, among other places, his adopted home of Pittsburgh; at the Somerset County, Pennsylvania library; and as far away as New York City (at the Madison Square Post Office).

Several large murals by McLeary from 1935 survive in good shape in the US Post Office-South Norwalk Main, but were hidden from public view in 1986 when that building was listed on the National Register of Historic Places. A mural in the U.S. Post Office and Courthouse in Pittsburgh, titled Modern Justice was damaged and lost prior to 1952, after the painted canvas panels fell off the wall in Courthouse No. 2 during a trial.

== Death ==
McLeary taught architecture at Carnegie Tech until his untimely death, aged 47, following a fall from the roof of his studio near Confluence, Somerset County, Pennsylvania in May 1949.|

== Sources ==
- McMahan, Truman. School and Society, June 18, 1949
- Washington Post, March 28, 1971
- Washington Post, April 27, 1977
