= Don Slesnick =

American businessman and politician (born 1943)

24th mayor of Coral Gables, Florida
- In office April 13, 2001 – April 15, 2011

Personal details
- Born: Donald David Slesnick II; November 7, 1943 (age 82) Harlingen, Texas, U.S.
- Spouse: Jeannett Slesnick (m. 1969; died 2023)
- Children: 2
- Education: University of Virginia (BA); University of Florida (JD); Florida International University (MPA)
- Profession: Attorney, elected official, advocate, military veteran

Military service
- Allegiance: United States
- Branch/service: United States Army
- Years of service: 1969–1971 US Army; 1972–1994 Army Reserves
- Rank: Lieutenant colonel
- Unit: 5th USA Artillery Group; 29th Civil Affairs Company, Mil. Region 1
- Battles/wars: Vietnam War
- Awards: Meritorious Service Medal; Army Commendation Medal (3 Oak Leaf Clusters); Vietnam Service Medal; Gov’t of Vietnam Service Medal; Vietnamese Staff Medal (1st Class); U.S. Army Outstanding Civilian Service Medal

Honorary Consul of Australia for Florida
- Incumbent
- Assumed office 2013

Donald David Slesnick II (born November 7, 1943) is an American attorney, community advocate, military veteran, diplomat, and public official who served as Mayor of Coral Gables, Florida, from 2001 to 2011. A longtime figure in South Florida civic affairs, he is known for his involvement in urban planning, historic preservation, and local government ethics. Slesnick has held national roles in the American Bar Association and currently serves as Honorary Consul for Australia in Florida. He is the founder and Managing Partner of the law firm Slesnick & Casey, specializing in labor and employment law. As of 2026, his four consecutive terms as mayor constitute the longest uninterrupted mayoral tenure in Coral Gables.

== Early life and education ==
Slesnick was born on November 7, 1943, to Donald David Slesnick, Sr. and Anne Thompson Farrior in Harlingen, Texas. His father served as a Master Sergeant in the Army Air Corps during the Italian campaign of the Second World War. Before being deployed overseas, he met Anne at Maxwell Field in Montgomery, Alabama. When Don Sr. returned from the war, the family settled in his father's hometown of Buffalo, New York. When Slesnick was ten years old, the family relocated to Miami in 1953 where he attended Kinloch Park Junior High and graduated with honors from Miami Senior High School.

After graduating high school, Slesnick attended the University of Virginia where he received his Bachelor of Arts degree in 1965. Slesnick would later credit his time at the University of Virginia with helping to lay the foundation for his later passion for historic preservation. Slesnick would then continue his education with a J.D. from the University of Florida in 1968, and a Master of Public Administration from Florida International University in 1980.

== Military service ==
As a university student Slesnick, like his father, chose to serve in the United States Army, beginning a decades-long career. He began his service as an ROTC student at the University of Virginia where he was commissioned as a 2nd Lieutenant in 1965. After graduating from law school in 1969, he reported to active duty for the Field Artillery Officer Basic Course at Fort Sill, Oklahoma, followed by two years in the Federal Republic of Germany as part of the 5th U.S. Artillery Group where Slesnick served as an atomic warhead advisor to NATO forces from 1969 to 1971. In the role, Slesnick coordinated with German, British, Canadians, Belgian, and Dutch forces.

Slesnick was then stationed at Fort Gordon, Georgia, for training as a civil affairs before serving a tour of duty as a captain in the 29th Civil Affairs Company, Danang, Vietnam, where he served as an advisor to the Federal Field Police engaged in anti-Viet Cong operations. His territory encompassed the five northernmost provinces divided from North Vietnam by the Vietnamese Demilitarized Zone (DMZ). After the completion of his tour of active duty, Slesnick served for 24 years in the United States Army Reserve, holding the positions of commander of the 478th Civil Affairs Company as well as Deputy Commandant of the 3387th USAR School. He ultimately retired from the reserves in 1994 with the rank of lieutenant colonel.

Slesnick has remained engaged with military affairs. He was a founder and co-chair of the community-wide “Team Miami” Project, which successfully led the efforts to relocate the U.S. Southern Command (USSOUTHCOM) from Panama to South Florida and also, following the destruction of Hurricane Andrew, to save and rebuild Homestead Air Force Base.

Slesnick then served as an Army Reserve ambassador and chairman of the Greater Miami Chamber of Commerce's Military Affairs Council.

Slesnick has received combat ribbons and awards for his military service, including the Meritorious Service Medal.

In 2012, Slesnick received the "Outstanding Civilian Service Award" from the U.S. Department of the Army, presented by the commanding general of SOUTHCOM, Douglas Fraser.

In 2020, Slesnick was inducted into the State of Florida's Veterans Hall of Fame.

== Law career ==
Upon returning from active duty in the Vietnam War, Slesnick began his law career and was admitted into the Florida Bar in 1972. He became an active participant in the legal community at the county, state and national levels and, as a result, was appointed to several leading positions in the field. These included serving as Director of Personnel for the Dade County Public Safety Department from 1972 to 1974, Director of Labor Relations and Legislative Affairs for Dade County Public Schools from 1974 to 1975, and General Counsel of the Dade County and Florida Police Benevolent Association from 1975 to 1978.

Slesnick has held several leadership posts in the American Bar Association (ABA) as well as the Florida Bar. These included being elected Chair of the Florida Bar Labor & Employment Law Section (1977-1978), Chair of the Florida Bar Law Week & American Citizenship Committee (1978–80), as well as Chairman of the American Bar Association Section of Labor & Employment Law (2017-2018). In 1985 Slesnick was admitted to the U.S. Supreme Court Bar. Slesnick is also a past Chair of the American Bar Foundation's Fellows and the 2015 President of the College of Labor and Employment Lawyers, an honorific organization recognizing the best advocates in that area of expertise.

Over the course of his legal career, Slesnick served for three years as the Section Officers Council Liaison to the ABA board of governors Member Services Committee, 10 years in the ABA House of Delegates from 2008 to 2018, as well as a member of the ABA Presidential Commission on Civic Education in the Nation's Schools from 2010 to 2013.

Alongside his roles in governmental and nonprofit organizations, Slesnick launched his private legal practice, the Law Office of Donald Slesnick, in 1978, which would later expand into the Law Offices of Slesnick & Lober, and finally to its current name of the Law Offices of Slesnick & Casey in 1992. His firm’s clients have included the South Florida Police Benevolent Association (PBA), Florida Nurses Association (FNA), Government Supervisors Association of Florida (GSAF), and the Dade Association of School Administrators (DASA).

== Political career ==
=== Early involvement ===
After becoming established in the legal community at the county and state levels by the end of the 1970s, Slesnick began his political career with his first campaigns for public office. He ran twice for State Representative for Florida's District 114, first in 1978 and again 1980. While unsuccessful, Slesnick's community involvement would deepen following these races, including being elected President of the Junior Orange Bowl Committee in the 1980s.

By the 1990s, Slesnick had emerged as a prominent community figure in South Florida and statewide across several fields. He had held several organizational leadership roles including Chairman of the CoraI Gables Community Foundation, Chairman of the Miami-Dade Cultural Affairs Council, President of the Dade Cultural Alliance, President of the Rotary Club of Coral Gables, President of the Dade Heritage Trust, and Chairman of the Miami-Dade County Historic Preservation Board. At the state level, Slesnick served as President of the Florida Trust for Historic Preservation (FTHP) from 1993-1995, and was credited by the Trust with increased advocacy in the Florida State Capitol, as well as expanding the organization by increasing its membership base. As a leading South Florida historic preservation figure, Slesnick advocated in the media for the adaptive reuse of historic structures and adoption of the successful economic models used by cities with robust preservation programs.

As Chairman of the Coral Gables Planning & Zoning Board, his first appointed government role in Coral Gables, Slesnick oversaw the establishment and execution of the Mediterranean Architectural Ordinance to maintain thematic alignment with the city’s founding vision. In that role he also helped guide the review and modification process of several major developments in the city to ensure adherence to the city’s zoning code. These included the Village of Merrick Park, the 10 Aragon Condominium, and Hotel Colonnade. With the latter, Slesnick notably crafted the zoning mechanism that allowed for a new high-rise hotel to be built on Miracle Mile while ensuring the protection of the Merrick-era historic Colonnade Building.

Slesnick also mobilized efforts to combat corruption in public office, including speaking out against the issue in the media. He also co-founded and led the Greater Miami Chamber of Commerce Ethics In Government and Business Task Force in 1998, which created a code of ethical conduct for chamber members and held an ethics summit to air the concerns of the business community. In that role, Slesnick also collaborated with the Hispanic leadership organization Mesa Redonda to create a privately funded watchdog group to help spotlight corrupt officials and business practices.

=== Mayor of Coral Gables ===
Following decades of increasing civic and community advocacy and involvement, in 2001 Slesnick successfully ran for Mayor of Coral Gables, defeating an incumbent. The election began a decade-long tenure in the position with four consecutive election campaigns. Slesnick’s term overlapped with a period of transition for the city. By the start of the 21st century, Coral Gables had become one of South Florida’s most prominent municipalities. It maintained a high profile internationally for its major historic landmarks and tourist destinations such as the Biltmore Hotel, Venetian Pool, and Fairchild Tropical Botanic Garden, as well as for significant outreach to Latin America. While the city was largely defined by its history, this period also coincided with its growing business activity. By the early 2000s, Coral Gables housed more than 150 multinational corporations, including major brands such as Yahoo!, Texaco, and Lucent Technologies, which had each established their Latin American headquarters in the city, as well as the continued growth of the University of Miami, one of the largest employers in the city.

In addition to the city’s growing international business and tourism presence, Slesnick’s mayoral tenure also navigated the local impacts of several major tumultuous national events in the first decade of the 21st century, including the "Dotcom" stock market bubble, the post-September 11th impact of business-related tourism, and the Great Recession. His administration would also oversee the area’s preparations and recoveries from the landfalls of hurricanes Katrina and Wilma.

==== Communications reforms ====
Slesnick carried out campaign initiatives focused on enhancing transparency in municipal governance and improving accessibility to City Hall. His administration oversaw the establishment of the Coral Gables Communications Office. The Communications Office then launched a series of programs across various media to modernize methods of connecting with residents and updating the community on city services, resources, meetings, and emergency-related issues. These included publishing annual reports, launching the Coral Gables E-News service, launching an emergency radio broadcast capability, and expanding the programming of the Coral Gables television station.

==== Infrastructure and Transportation ====
To enhance public transportation and infrastructure, the long-defunct trolley system of the 1920s was revived in November 2003 with a new, fare-free service using shuttle buses designed to replicate the appearance of the original trolleys. The service became highly successful and popular with residents and visitors, shuttling an average of over 1 million passengers per year. Another project by Slesnick’s administration to modernize the city’s infrastructure and transportation system was its implementation of a digitized cell phone parking payment system in 2005, making Coral Gables the first city in the United States to offer the service. To implement the program, the city partnered with Toronto-based firm Mint Technologies, sometimes abbreviated to Mint Inc., which had previously pioneered the system successfully in several Canadian cities. First announced in 2004 and launched in January 2005, the program was described as innovative and had received national coverage on ABC News, NBC News, NPR, and the Associated Press.

==== Planning and zoning reforms ====
Slesnick’s approach to city planning was centered on encouraging economic growth while balancing new development with an emphasis on sustaining Coral Gables’ architectural heritage. Early in his administration, Slesnick led the commission in halting construction of a controversial new annex to the historic Coral Gables City Hall, instead forming a citizens committee to review census-formed options for the site. This resulted in a less invasive plan that purchased a nearby building to accommodate the City’s need for additional office space.

To implement his deliberative, multi-pronged approach to economic development, which he promoted under the phrase "Smart Growth." Slesnick led the City Commission in a comprehensive rewrite of the city’s Zoning Code to guide its growth through the 21st century. Central to this new code was maintaining the City’s founding vision as a historic Mediterranean-themed planned community of the City Beautiful movement. These included measures focused on enhancing quality of life, such as traffic calming roundabouts to prevent speeding, as well as limiting commercial expansion into residential neighborhoods.

The city’s new zoning code and administrative policies also included a strong emphasis on restoring the city’s historic landmarks. His administration’s preservation initiatives included the restoration of the Merrick House, the Venetian Pool, the Country Club of Coral Gables, the Prado Entrance, the DeSoto Fountain, the Alhambra Water Tower, and the City Hall cupola’s fresco.

==== Major real estate developments ====
In approving major projects, Slesnick’s administration emphasized adherence to the city’s zoning and historic Mediterranean Revival character. One of the most significant proposed developments approved during Slesnick’s tenure was named “The Old Spanish Village”, which at that time was the largest approved residential project in the City. Developed by Ralph Sanchez, the mixed-use project encompassed approximately 900,000 square feet on 7.7 acres in downtown Coral Gables. The project was influenced by an unrealized 1920s “Village Project” plan by city founder George Merrick for a Spanish-themed village and was designed to reflect human scale and architectural continuity rather than high-rise density. Because of these elements, the project represented a major application of Slesnick’s “Smart Growth” framework and secured his support.

To ensure the project reflected Merrick’s intent and the city’s architectural character, Sanchez assembled a team of Coral Gables-based experts led by University of Miami architecture professor Jorge L. Hernandez; Permuy Architecture President Ignacio Permuy; and historian Arva Moore Parks, who incorporated Spanish and Mediterranean design elements consistent with the city’s founding era. The planning process was informed by historical research conducted before construction began in 2008. A 1926 Merrick-era building at 2901 Ponce de Leon Boulevard was restored for $1.7 million and integrated into the project as a link between the historic and the new, which would serve cultural and administrative uses prior to the opening of the Coral Gables Museum in 2010.

Additional large-scale developments approved during Slesnick’s terms of office included:

- The Bacardi World Headquarters on LeJeune Road, a notable example of Coral Gables’ international business presence.
- The current FIFA World Cup U.S. Regional Office building on Alhambra Circle
- Alhambra Towers, a prominent 16-story luxury commercial project featuring Mediterranean Revival design aesthetics.
- The Palace Coral Gables, a luxury senior living community.
- The municipal garage building containing the Coral Gables Art Cinema, a cultural hub for film and community engagement.

These projects and policies contributed to the shaping of Coral Gables’ urban landscape in the early 21st century within the framework of established design standards.

==== Public works and cultural initiatives ====
Alongside new zoning and development standards and strategies, Slesnick’s administration secured budget support for cultural and public works projects, such as repaving streets and improving storm drainage, as well as securing state and county funds for public beautification projects including the development of two new parks. Slesnick led art and culture initiatives also included the implementation of a new Public Art Master Plan to support the city’s growth and existing prominence as a cultural center, particularly in Latin American art. Other key cultural developments in the city during Slesnick’s tenure included the establishment of the Coral Gables Museum and Coral Gables Cinematique (Coral Gables Art Cinema).

The Coral Gables Museum was a particularly extensive project that incorporated both historic preservation as well as new construction. The primary facility for the new museum would restore and convert the historic Police and Fire Station, a deteriorating Great Depression-era WPA construction built in 1939 that had also served as the county jail and then a courtroom. The City of Coral Gables had worked with engineers to first stabilize the building and then undertook extensive restoration. The project also involved fundraising to add a new wing before the Coral Gables Museum building ultimately opened in 2010.

==== Education ====
Slesnick’s administration also made significant developments in the city’s education infrastructure, with education initiatives to expand the city’s quality of schools and educational offerings. At the university level, Slesnick secured a Development Agreement with the University of Miami, the city's largest employer, to protect the university’s growth plan for the next 20 years as well as provide Coral Gables residents with $20 million in addition to special programming courtesies by the university. Slesnick also entered the City of Coral Gables into an Education Compact with the Miami-Dade County School Board in 2006. The Compact led to the expansion of the Elementary into the renamed Coral Gables Preparatory Academy encompassing grades Pre-K through 8th spread over two campuses.

The Education Compact also led to the establishment of a new high school named “The International Studies Preparatory Academy”. The program combines world language instruction with an academically rigorous, internationally focused curriculum aligned with both U.S. and European Union educational standards. The program offers students the opportunity to receive dual certifications with both a U.S. high school diploma as well as the equivalent International Studies diploma from a European country based on the additional language they chose to study. The curriculum was developed as an international collaboration, leveraging previously established diplomatic relationships between the Coral Gables, the Miami-Dade County Public School System, the French Ministry of Foreign Affairs, the Consulate General of Italy, and the Educational and Science Ministry of Spain. At the time of its opening in 2011, the ISPA was the first program of its kind in the United States.

==== International outreach and diplomacy ====
In addition to his domestic efforts, Slesnick also utilized his diplomatic experience to significantly expand the city’s international presence. In 2003, Slesnick was part of a diplomatic effort in which he joined then-Governor Jeb Bush to make an official appeal for Miami to be named the permanent site of the Free Trade Area of the Americas (FTAA), a proposed hemisphere-wide free trade zone to eliminate or reduce trade barriers among countries of the Americas. He had also overseen outreach to advance Coral Gables’ involvement in the international Sister Cities program. As mayor, Slesnick led and received delegations from France, Spain, Italy, Guatemala, and Colombia. Slesnick also received foreign Heads of State during state visits to Coral Gables, including King Juan Carlos I of Spain, Prince Albert of Monaco, the vice president of the Republic of China (Taiwan) and the First Lady of Wakayama, Japan.

==== Public profile ====
During Slesnick’s tenure Coral Gables was recognized by several national and international institutions. In November 2004, First Lady Laura Bush recognized the city with a Preserve America Community designation. In 2006, Coral Gables was named the “Best Overall Sister City Program in the Nation” (mid-size cities) by Sister Cities International as well as receiving the “City Livability Award” from the U.S. Conference of Mayors.

The later years of Slesnick’s tenure were marked by additional recognition that centered on quality-of-life standards. In 2008 the Today Show listed Coral Gables as one of the Best Places to Retire in America and the following year Forbes Magazine ranked it one of the top 10 American Cities in which to live. In 2009, KaBoom, a national non-profit dedicated to advocating for play in children's lives, designated Coral Gables a “Playful City USA Community.” In 2010, The Wall Street Journal named Coral Gables the “Sixth Most Walkable Suburb in the United States”. In addition, American City & County Magazine awarded the city the America's Crown Community Award.

During his tenure as Mayor of Coral Gables, Slesnick would also receive national media visibility, including a televised appearance on the Colbert Report, and published interviews in The New York Times, The Wall Street Journal, and the Los Angeles Times.

==== Mayoral campaigns and non-governmental activities ====
During his four Mayoral campaigns, Slesnick was endorsed by major area media outlets, including The Miami Herald, The Sun Post, The Coral Gables Gazette, and Coral Gables News. He also received support from numerous public figures, among them Dorothy Thomson, the only woman to serve as Mayor of Coral Gables, and prominent Coral Gables author and historian Arva Moore Parks. National leaders who endorsed Slesnick’s campaigns included former ambassador Ambler Moss, former SOUTHCOM commanding general James T. Hill, and Tony Villamil, former U.S. Undersecretary of Commerce for Economic Affairs. Additional endorsements came from South Florida officials and business leaders such as former State Representative Annie Betancourt, Commissioner Luciano Suarez, developer W. Allen Morris, past Florida Bar President Herman Russomanno, and philanthropist Kirk Landon.

Slesnick’s ten years in office remain the longest consecutive tenure of any mayor in the history of Coral Gables. Throughout his time in office Slesnick continued to practice law and remain active with civic groups. In 2009, Slesnick was elected President of the Florida League of Mayors, serving from 2009 to 2010. That year he became the founding chairman of the Gables Good Government Committee (GGG), which he and his wife, Jeannett, established to advocate for the principles of good government, including civic participation, transparency, accountability, inclusivity, consensus, and adherence to the rule of law.

== Post-mayoral career ==
Slesnick held several leadership roles in South Florida prior to his election as Mayor of Coral Gables in 2001 and continued to serve in other positions during his mayorship. These included serving as past president of the Jr. Orange Bowl Committee, past president of the Coral Gables Rotary Club, and past chair of the Coral Gables Community Foundation.

Following the conclusion of his decade in elected office in 2011, Slesnick remained active in the legal field as well as in the community, particularly in historic preservation, education, diplomatic, and military affairs. Has also remained engaged in community endeavors, giving public lectures, and holding committee, foundation, and educational leadership positions. Among them, past president of the College of Labor & Employment Lawyers and Chair of The Fellows of the American Bar Foundation from 2013 to 2014.

Slesnick continues to hold several ongoing regional and statewide public roles. He currently serves as chair for the Florida secretary of state's Friends of Florida History Board, chair of Ethics Advisory Committee of Miami-Dade County Public Schools, as well as the director of community & partner relations for the St. Thomas University Institute for Ethical Leadership. One of Slesnick most significant historic preservation projects outside of South Florida was his involvement in the Preservation Institute of St. Augustine. In 2008, the City of St. Augustine managed 45 historic properties owned by the State of Florida but was no longer able to sustain their upkeep. Slesnick worked with historic preservationist Roy Hunt, a founding member and former Trustee of the Florida Trust for Historic Preservation, to help develop a plan for the University of Florida to assume management, with initial funding support from the state. The proposal was implemented through the University of Florida Foundation, which established UF Historic St. Augustine, and funds were raised to maintain the properties. Slesnick served for twelve years as a founding member of the University of Florida's Historic St. Augustine Board, reaching his term limit at the end of 2024. He currently serves on the Florida State University's Governor Leroy Collins Institute’s Board of Directors, the American Bar Association Journal's Board of Editors, and is the Chair of both the City of Coral Gables Landmarks advisory board and the Charter Review Committee.

As a former mayor of the city, Slesnick was also an active participant in several events marking the Centennial of the City of Coral Gables in 2025, including the Coral Gables Centennial Flag raising ceremony in City Hall, the Biltmore Hotel centennial time capsule dedication ceremony, and giving several lectures on the city’s history.

Beyond his own political career, Slesnick had also supported the political career of his wife, Jeannett, including her successful campaign and election to the Coral Gables City Commission in 2015, as well as two historically narrow races for Mayor of Coral Gables. Following her death in 2023, Slesnick has represented her in receiving posthumous recognitions on her behalf.

=== Diplomatic posts and activities ===
In addition to his military, legal, and political careers, Slesnick has also maintained a diplomatic career through several roles and international activities representing various institutions and bilateral relations. His involvement began with his academic studies, during which Slesnick received his B.A. degree in Foreign Affairs from the University of Virginia in 1965.

As an attorney, Slesnick was selected to be a two-term member of the American Bar Association's United Nations Delegation, serving as an Observer to the Economic Council in Geneva.

In 2000, Slesnick was named a U.S. Army Reserve Ambassador for Florida. He held the post through 2015 and now holds the title of Army Reserve Ambassador Emeritus.

As Mayor of Coral Gables, Slesnick made expanding the city’s international relations and profile a priority, by leading delegations to the city’s Sister Cities of Aix-en-Provence, France; Granada, Spain; Pisa, Italy; La Antigua, Guatemala; and Cartagena, Colombia. Following those outreach excursions, he positioned the city to receive return delegations from each of those cities. He had also participated in foreign aid missions to Haiti in the aftermath of the 2010 Haiti earthquake.

Throughout his career, Slesnick has represented the South Florida community while meeting with international heads of state, including the monarchs of the United Kingdom, Spain, and Monaco, and the vice president of Taiwan.

In recognition of his international outreach efforts, Slesnick became the first Floridian to be awarded the Friend of Foreign Service Medal by Taiwan.

Following his tenure as Mayor, in 2013 Slesnick was named Honorary Consul for Australia in Florida, a U.S. State Department-accredited position that Slesnick continues to hold. In that role, Slesnick helped inaugurate a new Australian consulate in Coral Gables in 2014 to provide consular assistance to Australians living in and visiting Florida and to enhance trade, economic investment, educational and cultural linkages.

== Recognitions and legacy ==
=== Civic recognitions ===
Don Slesnick has received numerous recognitions for his public service, legal, military, and diplomatic careers.

Prior to his time in elected office, Slesnick was recognized with the 1993 Greater Miami Chamber of Commerce's "Bill Colson Leadership Award", the 1997 "Commandant's Meritorious Public Service Award" from the U.S. Coast Guard, and the 1998 "Medal of Merit Award in Leadership" by the Miami Dade County Board of County Commissioners.

While serving as mayor of Coral Gables, Slesnick received the 2005 "Four-Way Test Award" from Rotary Club of Miami as well as the "International Vision Award" by the Latin Business Club of America.

In 2006, Slesnick received the” Outstanding Citizen Award" from the Council of Garden Club Presidents of Miami-Dade County.

In 2007, Slesnick was awarded the "Distinguished Civic Achievement Award" by the American Jewish Congress as well as the "Protector of the Climate" by the Broward County Audubon Society.

In 2008, Miami-Dade County recognized Slesnick with the "International Citizen of the Year Award” for his diplomatic efforts and contributions. That year he also received the "Government Leadership Award" from the Miami Chapter of the American Institute of Architects ("AIA").

In 2009, Slesnick was elected President of the Florida League of Mayors.

In 2010, Slesnick was awarded the "Friend of Foreign Service Medal" by the Republic of China (Taiwan).

In 2011, during his final year in office, he was recognized with the South Florida Kiwanis "Citizen of the Year Award" as well as the "Community Service Award" from the Coral Gables Community Foundation.

In 2012, Selsnick received the Outstanding Civilian Service Medal from U.S. Southern Command General Douglas Fraser.

In 2018, Slesnick received the "Distinguished Member Award" from Leadership Florida.

In 2020, Slesnick was inducted as a member of the Pi Kappa Phi Fraternity's National Hall of Fame and the State of Florida Veterans Hall of Fame.

In 2022, Slesnick received the Legacy Award from the Florida Trust for Historic Preservation.

In 2023, Slesnick was awarded the "Outstanding Alumnus Medallion" from Florida International University.

In 2024, Slesnick was awarded as a co-recipient with his wife (posthumously) the "Henry M. Flagler Community Builder Award" from the Greater Miami Chamber of Commerce as well as the Excellence in Public Service Award from the Gables Good Government Committee.

In August 2025, Slesnick was a co-recipient along with his wife, Jeannett Slesnick (posthumously), of the Coral Gables Chamber of Commerce's "George E. Merrick Award of Merit", the highest recognition in the City of Coral Gables.

In October 2025, Slesnick was the recipient of the inaugural “Don Slesnick Civic Vision Award” by the Coral Gables Art Cinema. The award was named in his honor for his role in helping to establish the Coral Gables Art Cinema while serving as Mayor. The award was unveiled during the Cinema’s “Lights & Legacy” 15th anniversary event. Cinema President and Founder Steve Krams stated “Don deserves a lion’s share of the credit for the fact that Coral Gables Art Cinema exists. He was the mayor—and his vision and influence proved to be very persuasive.”

Alongside his public recognition, the University of Miami maintains interviews and career archives of Slesnick in its Digital Collections and oral histories.

=== Legal recognition ===
Slesnick has also received several professional recognitions within the legal profession, which he has continued to practice.

In 1989, Slesnick received the "Distinguished Service Award" from the American Bar Association Labor & Employment Section.

In 2016, Slesnick was the recipient of the "Lifetime Achievement Award" from the American Bar Association's Solo, Small Firm and General Practice Division.

In 2018, Slesnick was awarded the "Lifetime Achievement Award" from the Florida Bar Labor & Employment Law Section.

Slesnick was honored as an "Honorary Life Member" by the Miami Dade County Bar Association and, in 2022, received the Florida Bar’s "50 Year Member Recognition."

=== Media recognition ===
Alongside his institutional recognition, Slesnick has also been recognized in media for his leadership roles in and contributions to South Florida.

Among legal media outlets, Slesnick has been included in Florida Trend magazine's "Legal Elite" list and has also been designated as a top-rated Employment & Labor attorney in Florida by Super Lawyers, a patented and research driven selection process that also weighs peer feedback, ultimately selecting the top 5% of rated attorneys to its annual lists.

In 2004 Slesnick was listed by South Florida CEO magazine as one of the "Top 100 Global Leaders of South Florida”.

Slesnick was named one of South Florida’s "50 Most Influential Persons" by the SunPost in 2007.

In 2017 Slesnick received the "Gold Medal Award" from the Miami Today newspaper.

In 2025, Slesnick was named one of Miami’s top attorneys by Best Lawyers magazine.

== Personal life ==
Don was married for 54 years to Jeannett Black Slesnick, a South Florida community advocate and former Coral Gables City Commissioner, until her death in 2023. The couple have two children, Kathleen Slesnick Kauffman and Donald Slesnick III, a daughter-in-law, Cecilia Dubon Slesnick, and four grandchildren: Olivia Kauffman, Julia Kauffman, Ceci Slesnick, and Sebastian Slesnick.

Don's mother, Anne Leidel Slesnick (born Anne Thompson Farrior), was also a noted community figure in the city. She was described by the Miami Herald in its coverage as "matriarch to the greater Coral Gables community" following her death in 2024 at the age of 101. She had been a member of the Junior Orange Bowl Committee, Daughters of the American Revolution, the University of Miami Cancer Association, and co-founded the Granada and Biltmore Women’s Golf Associations. In honor of her 100th birthday, the Coral Gables Commission declared Sept. 2, 2022, as “Anne Slesnick Leidel Day” in the city. In media interviews, Don Slesnick has acknowledged both his mother, Anne, and wife, Jeannett, as significant influences on his own approach to public service.

== See also ==
- Jeannett Slesnick
- Coral Gables
- Historic preservation
- Community activism
- Civic engagement
