= Jeannett Slesnick =

American advocate and public official

- Born: July 28, 1947; St. Louis, Missouri
- Died: August 3, 2023 (aged 76); Coral Gables, Florida
- Education: University of Florida (BA)
- Occupations: Philanthropist, advocate, entrepreneur, publisher, elected official
- Years active: 1971 – 2023
- Spouse: Don Slesnick (m. 1969)

Jeannett Black Slesnick (July 28, 1947 – August 3, 2023) was an American philanthropist, entrepreneur, community advocate, publisher, public official, and cultural patron. Slesnick had served in several leadership positions in South Florida boards and foundations as well as in elected office in the City of Coral Gables where she resided until her death. She published the widely circulated local news magazine Jeannett's Journal and founded the prominent South Florida real estate firm Slesnick and Jochem, which remains active under the direction of her business partner, Ginger Jochem.

== Early life ==
Jeannett Frances Black was born on July 28, 1947, in St. Louis, Missouri to Roy and Cecilia Black. Her family owned a citrus grove in Vero Beach, Florida, where they would relocate for the rest of Jeannett's upbringing. She graduated from Vero Beach High School in 1965, after which she first attended the University of South Florida in Tampa, then transferred to the University of Florida in Gainesville. There she met her future husband, Don Slesnick, a fellow student, in 1967 at the age of 20. He proposed on Valentine's Day of 1969 and the couple wed on May 3, 1969, as Don prepared to report to active duty as a 2nd Lieutenant in the U.S. Army’s Artillery Officers Basic Course at Fort Sill, Oklahoma.

The couple spent three months living in Lawton, Oklahoma for Don's training as an artillery officer, followed by two years living abroad in Germany while Don served as an atomic warhead advisor with NATO. In 1971, Jeannett was nominated for Military Wife of the Year by the 5th U.S. Army Artillery Group (USAAG), located in Büren, Westphalia. During that posting, she served as the education advisor sponsored by the University of Maryland.

Upon returning to the United States, the Slesnicks were briefly stationed at Fort Gordon, Georgia, until Don Slesnick went to serve in the Vietnam War, during which Jeannett would complete her bachelor's degree at the University of Florida, graduating in 1972. That same year, upon the completion of Don's tour of duty, the Slesnicks moved to Coral Gables, bought their first home, and Jeannett gave birth to their first child, Kathleen.

== Professional career ==
Professionally, Slesnick developed a successful practice as a leading South Florida realtor. Slesnick specialized in the Coral Gables market, a historic planned community known for its Mediterranean architecture and affluent neighborhoods, and for being the most valuable real estate market in the United States after surpassing Beverly Hills and New York City in 2025. She began her career in 1975 working with Kerdyk Real Estate for nine years where she secured her realtor's license. She then went to work for EWM (Esslinger Wooten Maxwell) Realtors where she remained for over 25 years and became the firm's top producer in their Coral Gables office and further established herself in the field regionally.

By the mid-1990s, Slesnick was ranked among the top one percent of realtors in the United States and had surpassed $100 million in career sales. In 2003, while at EWM, Slesnick met fellow realtor Ginger Jochem who would become a close friend and key collaborator in Slesnick's various career pursuits and projects, including publishing and public policy advocacy. In 2006 Slesnick launched her own firm, Slesnick and Associates, with Jochem after they had each achieved real estate broker status. The primary impetus for creating her own firm was a desire to deepen her philanthropic work, which required more financial resources as well as more flexibility in her schedule.

The firm proved successful early on, quickly securing their first sale with a value of $2.2 million ($3.5 million in 2025, adjusted for inflation). Later renamed Slesnick and Jochem in 2011, as the firm became more successful it would locate its offices on the grounds of the Biltmore Hotel, a prominent National Historic Landmark. The firm expanded its specialization and offerings in several primary South Florida real estate markets including Coral Gables, Brickell/Downtown Miami, Coconut Grove, and Key Biscayne. Within a decade Slesnick and Jochem would become the top listing brokerage in Coral Gables.

By 2017, she ranked in the top one-half percent of realtors nationally. Slesnick held the distinction of being the top listing agent on MLS in Coral Gables for over 30 years in terms of the number of homes listed and sold. In media interviews, Slesnick partly credited her success to her cumulative experience and deep knowledge of Coral Gables building and zoning codes.

== Journalism and publishing ==
Among her community and entrepreneurial ventures, Slesnick had a 15-year career in journalism and publishing. Her first involvement in journalism came after joining the Junior League of Miami, where she helped create its monthly magazine. This would inform her initial experiences in reporting on community-related news. Then, in 2008, while Slesnick served as Chair of the Coral Gables Community Foundation, Slesnick advocated for pursuing a grant from the Knight Foundation to begin an online magazine for Coral Gables residents, which the Foundation was successful in securing. In April 2015, Slesnick again served as an active mediator and pipeline of community information and resources when, as a Coral Gables Commissioner, she directed her office to publish a monthly online newsletter relating to Coral Gables issues and news.

In August 2017 Slesnick launched her best-known work, Jeannett's Journal, to report in-depth news in the Coral Gables community. It would cover notable stories, events, and issues in the area until her death in 2023. Running in a quarterly publication format, the magazine grew to a circulation reaching approximately 16,000 recipients electronically and another 18,000 physical copies mailed primarily to single family households, making it one of the most popular publications dedicated to coverage of Coral Gables and surrounding communities. Part of the publication's success stemmed from a scarcity in media reporting following the Miami Herald's closing of much of its coverage of the Coral Gables area. Additionally, the magazine was also focused on reporting cultural, non-profit, and social news often overlooked by other media outlets. In its operations, Slesnick served as Chief Editor and publisher, and oversaw operations along with copy editor Susi Davis.

== Advocacy and philanthropy ==
Prior to her political and publishing careers, Slesnick had become an active advocate in support of several causes, including literacy, sustainability, historic preservation, community development, public health, senior care issues, and women's professional development. Her advocacy resulted in several projects, programs, initiatives, and organizations being created around those respective issues. She was also engaged financially, supporting and serving on the boards of numerous non-profits throughout her career.

In literacy Slesnick is credited with helping to establish the Coral Gables Literacy Festival in 2020 which would partner with the City of Coral Gables and several leading literary institutions including the Scholastic Book Fair, Books & Books, the Coral Gables Museum, and the Coral Gables Library to provide community services for local youth. These included donations of books to families in need, free literacy screenings and evaluations, children's activities, and author events. She was also a leading advocate for the renovation and refurbishment of the Coral Gables Library, a registered architectural landmark of Coral Gables.

Slesnick was also active in developing assistance programs for young women. In her work to advance women's professional development, Slesnick had partnered with Coral Gables Senior High School to create a professional mentoring program, known as the “YaYas”, for female students to help them write resumes, prepare for interviews, and provide professional attire for those in need.

Slesnick advocated for sustainability and environmentalism in several capacities, including in her role as a Board of Directors member of the Coral Gables Garden Club, where she supported and publicized initiatives such as establishing new parks, increasing the number of trees in the city, and promoting the socio-economic and urban benefits to extensive tree presence in cities. A notable example would be a major sustainability and beautification project undertaken while Slesnick served as Chair of the Coral Gables Community Foundation. Slesnick worked with the city to design a plan and then raised the funds to place a series of oak trees on the median of one of the city's prominent downtown business district thoroughfares, which were later replaced with Royal Palms and relocated to a residential neighborhood where they have remained as character-defining features.

Another major focus of her advocacy was historic preservation. In that field, Slesnick was a patron and supporter of the Historic Preservation Association of Coral Gables (HPACG), as well as an active member of the Dade Heritage Trust. Slesnick also campaigned politically against the issue of high-density development as well as controversial Master Plan changes and frequently awarded variances to the Coral Gables Zoning Code. The high-density development issue was seen by Slesnick as well as many residents and members of the historic preservation community as damaging to the city's long-established historic character, leading Slesnick to advocate in favor of more robust preservation efforts through government roles as a City Commissioner and as Vice Chair of the Coral Gables Historic Preservation Board.

Slesnick's other community leadership included serving as President of Gables Good Government (GGG), a not-for-profit community organization founded in 2009 to encourage transparency and public participation in Coral Gables government, and would lead the group from 2012 to 2015. Slesnick was also active in supporting cultural programming through Actor's Playhouse at the historic Miracle Theatre, where she served as a Board member for twenty years from 1995 to 2015, and supporting art openings. Other roles Slesnick held in South Florida through her public life included serving on the Board of the American Red Cross of South Florida as well as being a Board member of the Junior League of Miami.

In addition to her civic roles, Slesnick was also active in the Coral Gables faith community. She served twice in the leadership position of Senior Warden of St. Philip's Episcopal Church, a part of the Slesnick family's four generations of involvement in the church. Thereafter she remained active in organizing and supporting many of the church's events.

== Political career ==
By the start of the 1980s, Slesnick was widely recognized in South Florida for her engagement in community issues, leading to direct political activism and involvement. Her political career formally began when she first ran unsuccessfully for Coral Gables City Commission in 1983 as a rare woman candidate at the time. Following that race, Slesnick's community involvement continued to deepen, including several cultural and economic leadership positions in the region. One early role following her first campaign was Slesnick's election as a member of the Coral Gables Chamber of Commerce Board of Directors, serving from 1984 to 1987, followed by being elected President of the Junior Orange Bowl Committee in 1989.

As their public profiles expanded through the 1980s and 1990s, Jeannett and Don Slesnick would also increasingly attend events to represent the communities they were active in. Among them, the Slesnicks were invited to meet Queen Elizabeth II and Prince Philip, Duke of Edinburgh of the United Kingdom during a private reception held aboard the Royal Yacht Britannia. The event, which was part of the Queen's trade promotional visit to the United States in May 1991, was also attended by other American dignitaries including former Presidents Gerald Ford and Ronald Reagan, former First Ladies Betty Ford and Nancy Reagan, U.S. Senators Bob Graham and Connie Mack III, and Florida Governor Lawton Chiles. Over the next decade, Slesnick maintained a public profile by continuing to expand her community advocacy into more areas, serve on several additional boards, committees, and foundations, as well as launch her own successful real estate practice.

Beginning in 2001, Jeannett Slesnick reengaged with politics directly when she served as campaign manager for her husband Don's four successful Mayoral campaigns, leading to a record 10 consecutive years as the city's mayor. Following his election as Mayor of Coral Gables, Jeannett was noted as a highly active First Lady from 2001 to 2011. This included joining her husband to represent Coral Gables during several high-profile functions, including welcoming dignitaries such as King Juan Carlos I of Spain and Prince Albert II of Monaco, and as guests at the 2010 White House Christmas Party. Don Slesnick would later credit her involvement as a playing a significant role in his own achievements as mayor.

While serving as Coral Gables First Lady, Slesnick had also continued to advance several initiatives, including starting the Gables-At-Home program with the Coral Gables Community Foundation, an organization in which Slesnick was elected Chairman in 2008. To help ensure the success of the program during its planning stages, Slesnick traveled to Boston to personally study the Beacon Hill Village program as a model. Gables-At-Home would ultimately support a range of senior care-related services including alert systems for accidents and assistance with transportation for doctor's visits. These services were catered to elderly residents who did not live in assisted living facilities and who were at risk of being overlooked. In acknowledging its impact, the program was later described as "vital" by Coral Gables Mayor Vince Lago and the City Commission. Slesnick was awarded the Elder Advocate Award in 2010 by the Alliance for Aging for her work in developing the program and its successful impact on senior residents of Coral Gables.

As the city's First Lady, Slesnick was also active in pushing sustainability projects, which resulted in her being named “Sustainer of the Year” by the Junior League of Miami for three years during her tenure. Slesnick was also active in the area's cultural development, becoming the Coral Gables Museum's inaugural Board Secretary and one of its principal fundraisers. She remained on the museum's Board of Directors for six years from 2006 to 2012.

As her civic engagement, advocacy and philanthropy continued to increase, Slesnick also served in several appointed government roles including Chair of the Coral Gables Cultural Affairs Advisory Board, Vice Chair of the semi-judicial Coral Gables Historic Preservation Board, and a member of the Coral Gables Economic Development Board. She was also appointed to a Florida Bar Grievance Committee to adjudicate complaints against lawyers and served on several Dade County Cultural Affairs Council grant panels. Later she was appointed by the County Commission as a founding member of the Independent Civilian Review Panel with oversight of the police department's handling of citizen complaints.

In 2015 Slesnick ran again for a seat on the Coral Gables City Commission in a crowded field of candidates, this time winning her election. The race featured five other candidates and was considered highly contested as the seat's incumbent had been termed out after serving in office for 20 years. The Miami Herald reported Slesnick beat her next closest competitor in the field by a margin of seven points with turnout reflecting a significant increase from the 2013 election. Slesnick was sworn into the Coral Gables Commission on April 17, 2015.

As a Commissioner, Slesnick made resident engagement and community involvement priorities. This included creating a monthly online newsletter of community updates and events, as well as conducting resident surveys and hosting town halls on constituent issues. Among them was a session she hosted titled “Coral Gables 2030” to gauge the priorities and concerns of residents for the long-term future of the city. Slesnick also successfully pushed to renovate the architecturally significant Coral Gables Library, which ultimately took place from 2021 to 2023.

Following her tenure as Coral Gables Commissioner, Slesnick then ran twice for mayor of Coral Gables in narrow races against former mayor Raul Valdes-Fauli. Both races were primarily defined by the issue of high-density development in Coral Gables, which had traditionally been characterized by community-oriented village developments, community parks, and small-scale historic Mediterranean-style properties within the city's original conception as a planned community of the City Beautiful movement. Slesnick's campaign was centered on reigning in development and maintaining the founding vision and Master Plan for the city. Slesnick's candidacy was also notable for its potential to have made her the second woman elected Mayor of Coral Gables since its founding, and the first in over 30 years since the 1985-1987 tenure of Dorothy Thomson. In 2017 Slesnick had lost the election by less than 1% with a margin of 186 votes, marking the closest electoral vote margin in the city's history.

She ran again in 2019 as a late entry into the race against the incumbent while also undergoing chemotherapy treatments for cancer. As with the previous election, the controversial issue of high-density development and the added context of a rematch following the historically tight margins between both candidates became the prevailing themes of the race. Her platform was described as popularly-rooted, with Slesnick's campaign being noted for refusing financial support from real estate developers. Despite her late entry, Slesnick's campaign managed to reach a diverse coalition, including members of several prominent Coral Gables Hispanic families such as the Más Canosa, Permuy, Gonzalez, and Concepcion families. Other significant developments in the campaign elevated the race beyond the local level, including notable bipartisan endorsements by former U.S. Senator and Florida Governor Bob Graham, former Florida Senator Miguel Diaz de la Portilla, past Florida International University President Mitch Maidique, philanthropists Trish and Dan Bell, as well as the organizations Ruth's List, the International Association of Fire Fighters (IAFF), the Coral Gables Fraternal Order of Police, and SAVE Dade.

Slesnick ultimately lost the rematch, this time by a narrower margin of 123 votes, breaking their previous record as the closest mayoral election in Coral Gables history.

== Final years ==
Though she remained highly active and engaged in her advocacy and community development projects, the final decade of Slesnick's life was marked by recurring health challenges. She was first diagnosed with lymphoma in 2014. While serving as a Coral Gables Commissioner, Slesnick also struggled with breast cancer, which ultimately went into remission in 2016. In 2019-2020 Slesnick's lymphoma returned, and treatment resumed, proving successful.

Lymphoma returned for a third time in 2022, after which Slesnick received intensive treatment at Baptist Hospital. Despite her deteriorating health that year, Slesnick continued to advocate for the causes she supported throughout her life. These included continuing to produce Jeannett's Journal as well as establishing the Jeannett Slesnick Scholarship Fund with the Coral Gables Community Foundation.

In March 2023 she made her final public post on social media, calling for real estate developers to preserve at least 30% of existing trees as part of new construction to support sustainability, reinforce community character, reduce surrounding temperatures, and increase the return on their own investments in property values.

Slesnick died on August 3, 2023 in Coral Gables, Florida, six days following her 76th birthday.

== Legacy and recognitions ==
During her lifetime, Slesnick received multiple civic awards and institutional honors for her philanthropy and community advocacy.

Slesnick received early recognition for her community contributions in 1981 when she was awarded the Key to the City of Coral Gables by then-Mayor Bill Chapman for her activism and was also named Volunteer of the Year by the Junior League of Miami.

Slesnick was named “Sustainer of the Year” by the Junior League of Miami three times in 2001, 2007, and 2010 for her work in supporting sustainability.

In 2003 Slesnick was a finalist for the “Athena Award” selection process in recognition of her advocacy for women.

In 2009, the Coral Gables Chamber of Commerce recognized Slesnick as a “Distinguished Honoree” in the George E. Merrick Award of Merit competition.

In 2010 Slesnick's advocacy on behalf of the elderly was recognized with the Elder Advocate Award from the Alliance for Aging in 2010.

In 2018, Slesnick was recognized with the Meritorious Public Service award by the Florida Bar for her work with the Bar's Grievance Committee.

In 2019, Slesnick was acknowledged by Coral Gables News among the women who have had major role in history of Coral Gables for her career as a well known community advocate and public official.

In 2022 Slesnick was honored as the Rotary Club of Coral Gables “Citizen of the Year” for her civic advocacy.

Toward the end of her life, Slesnick had established and funded the continuing “Community Spirit Scholarship” at the Coral Gables Community Foundation, known as the Jeannett Slesnick Community Spirit Scholarship Fund. The scholarship supports South Florida graduating high school seniors from Coral Gables High School, Miami Senior High School, and the International Studies Preparatory Academy (ISPA) with up to four years of college tuition assistance.

In 2023, the Coral Gables City Commission awarded Slesnick a rare second Key to the City of Coral Gables and as well as a City Proclamation naming July 11 as “Jeannett Slesnick Day” in Coral Gables. Both were accepted on her behalf by her husband Don Slesnick, who read her acceptance statement which concluded “Know that my love for our city and my fellow residents will burn brightly in my soul long after my departure”, a statement that had become widely quoted after her death.

Her death was a significant event in South Florida, drawing media coverage as well as several prominent tributes that continued years following her death. Among the published media coverage was an editorial obituary written by a columnist of the Miami Herald, titled “Coral Gables leader dies at 76”, and a full-length photographic article entitled “The Passing of a Star: Jeannett Slesnick” in Coral Gables Magazine.

Her funeral in St. Philip's Episcopal Church was reported to have been attended by more than 500 guests, requiring the city trolley to ferry attendees from the Biltmore Hotel parking lot to the service. On the weekend following her death, the exterior of the Coral Gables City Hall was lit in lime green, the color of lymphoma awareness, in Slesnick's honor. She was described by the Coral Gables Museum as a “pillar of the community” in a statement acknowledging her service and support during the museum's founding years. In an interview with the Miami Herald, her husband, Don, credited her influence as helping him achieve success in his own political career.

In 2024, Slesnick was posthumously recognized as a recipient of the Miami-Dade County Mayor's Pioneer Award as part of the 2024 “In the Company of Women Awards”. She was also named a 2024 Junior League of Miami “Women Who Make a Difference” Honoree and a co-recipient of both Henry M. Flagler Community Builder Award as well as the Gables Good Government (GGG) "Excellence in Public Service Award" alongside her husband Don, who accepted each on her behalf.

In 2025, Slesnick was honored with the designation of "Jeannett Slesnick Literacy Row" in the primary thoroughfare of the Coral Gables Youth Center in recognition of her role in establishing the Coral Gables Literacy Festival. The Resolution was passed in June 2024 and the designation was unveiled and inaugurated in May 2025. Also that year, Slesnick was honored nationally with an American flag flown over the United States Capitol by Congressman Carlos Giménez, and as a co-recipient of the George E. Merrick Award for Excellence alongside her husband Don by the Coral Gables Chamber of Commerce during the Centennial Year of Coral Gables.

In 2026, Slesnick was a posthumous recipient of the Civic Arts Award during the Coral Gables Museum Centennial Gala.

Following Slesnick's death, the Coral Gables Community Foundation manages and maintains the complete archives for Jeannett's Journal.

== Personal life ==
Jeannett Slesnick was married to Donald D. Slesnick II for 54 years. They had two children, Kathleen Anne and Donald David III, as well as four grandchildren Ceci Slesnick, Sebastian Slesnick, Olivia Kauffman, and Julia Kauffman.

== See also ==
- Historic preservation
- Literacy
- Environmentalism
- Activist ageing
- Community activism
- Civic engagement
- Beautification
- New Urbanism
- Coral Gables
