= Sollitt =

Sollitt may refer to:

- Sollitt, Illinois, United States, a community in Kankakee County

== People with the surname ==
- Adam Sollitt (born 1977), English footballer and football coach
- Brian Sollitt (1938–2013), English confectioner
- Edna Richolson Sollitt (1883–1962), American pianist, writer
- Oliver Sollitt (1860–1945), American politician and businessman
