= Guenther Koehne =

American oncologist and scientist

- Born: Germany
- Education: Medical University of Hamburg (MD, PhD)
- Occupations: Physician, oncologist, scientist
- Known for: Stem cell transplantations and cellular immunotherapies
- Spouse: Sissy DeMaria-Koehne
- Medical career
- Institutions: Baptist Health South Florida; Miami Cancer Institute (Deputy Director); Memorial Sloan Kettering Cancer Center (former); Weill Cornell Medical College (former Associate Professor); Florida International University (Chairman, Department of Translational Medicine)
- Sub-specialties: Hematologic oncology; Bone marrow transplantation; Multiple myeloma; Leukemia; Lymphoma
- Research: Stem cell transplantation; Cellular immunotherapy; Hematologic malignancies

Guenther Koehne is an American physician, oncologist, and scientist focused on stem cell transplantations and cellular immunotherapies. Koehne is affiliated with Baptist Health South Florida and serves as deputy director of the Miami Cancer Institute, where he founded the Global Summit on Immunotherapies for Hematologic Malignancies. He is an expert on diseases like multiple myeloma, leukemia, and lymphoma.

== Career ==
Koehne completed his research fellowship in immunology and fellowship in medical oncology and hematology at Memorial Sloan Kettering Cancer Center. He specialized in adult bone marrow transplantation at Sloan Kettering and was an associate professor of medicine at Weill Cornell Medical College.

In 2017, Koehne joined the Miami Cancer Institute at Baptist Health South Florida, where he established the hematologic cancer program. Koehne was also named Chief of Blood and Marrow Transplantation and Hematologic Oncology at Baptist Health. He became deputy director of the Miami Cancer Institute in 2019. That same year, Koehne founded the Global Summit on Immunotherapies for Hematologic Malignancies, which brings leading cancer physicians and researchers to South Florida every year.

In 2020, Koehne became chairman of the Department of Translational Medicine at Florida International University’s Herbert Wertheim College of Medicine.

Koehne has authored or co-authored dozens of research papers on cancer treatment, in addition to leading novel clinical trials. He has also chaired the Leukemia and Lymphoma Society’s Light the Night Campaign, a national fundraising event to end cancer.

== Personal life ==
Koehne was born and raised in Germany, where he received his medical degree and PhD from the Medical University of Hamburg. Koehne is married to marketing executive Sissy DeMaria-Koehne. The couple have residences in Coral Gables, Vero Beach, and New York City.
