= Coral Gables Branch Library =

Library in Coral Gables, Florida, US

Coordinates: 25.7397°N 80.2658°W

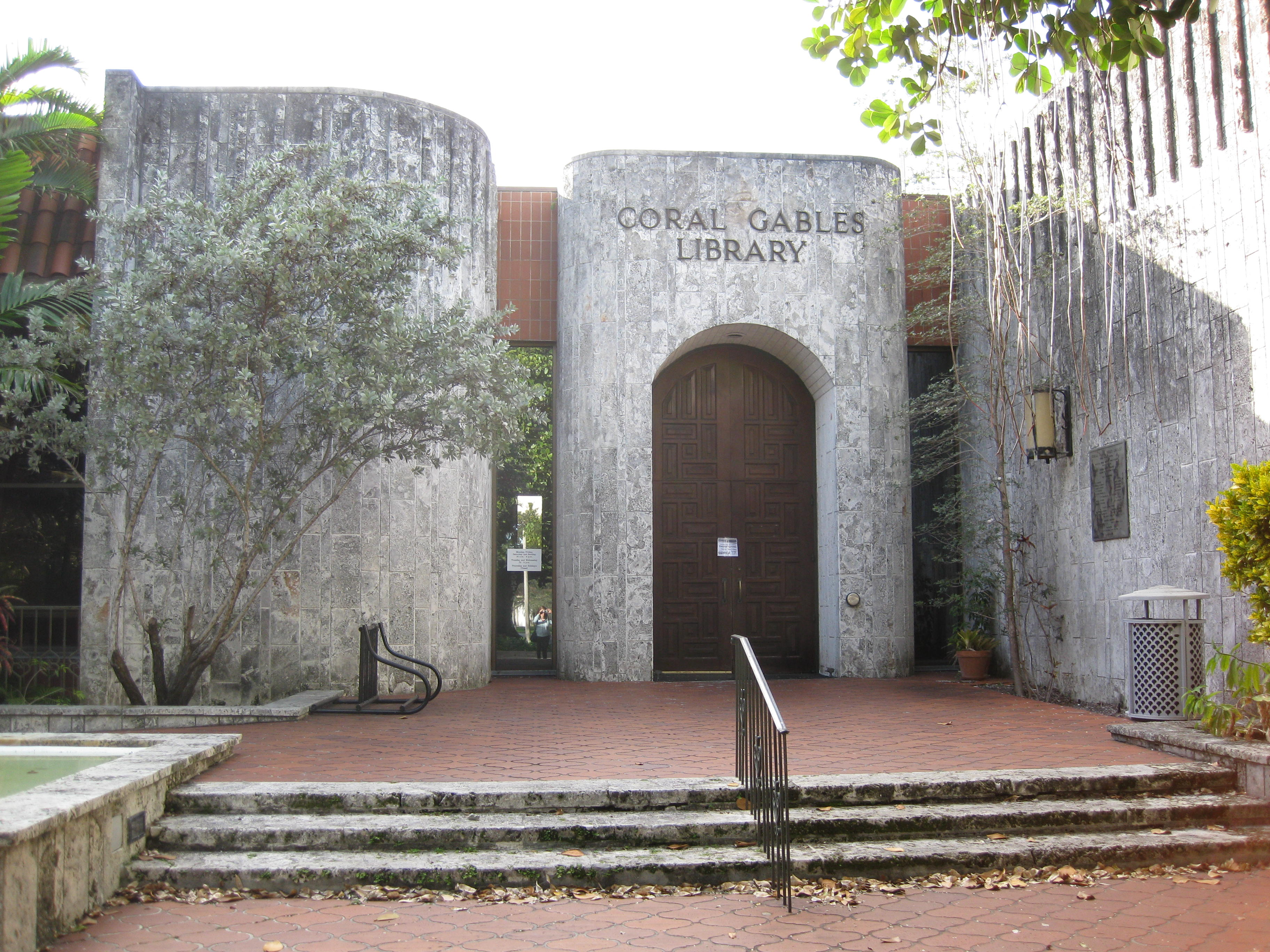
- Location: 3443 Segovia Street; Coral Gables, Florida, United States
- Type: Public
- Established: 1927
- Branch of: Miami-Dade Public Library System

Other information
- Website: mdpls.org/branch-coral-gables

The Coral Gables Branch Library is one of 49 branches of the Miami-Dade Public Library System, located at 3443 Segovia Street in Coral Gables, Florida. It was established in 1927 by the Coral Gables Woman's Club.

== History ==
The library started as a lending library in November 1927, established mainly by the efforts of Don Peabody, then president of the Coral Gables Women's Club. The library opened in a room the Cathedral Room of the La Puerta Del Sol, now the Douglas Entrance of the library's location, with furniture, fine art, and tapestries provided by The Coral Gables Corporation, courtesy of George Merrick, the founder of the city of Coral Gables. The first 300 books were requested by the Woman's Club by writing letters to authors requesting copies. An additional 100 books donated by William Jennings Bryan from his private library among other donations received.

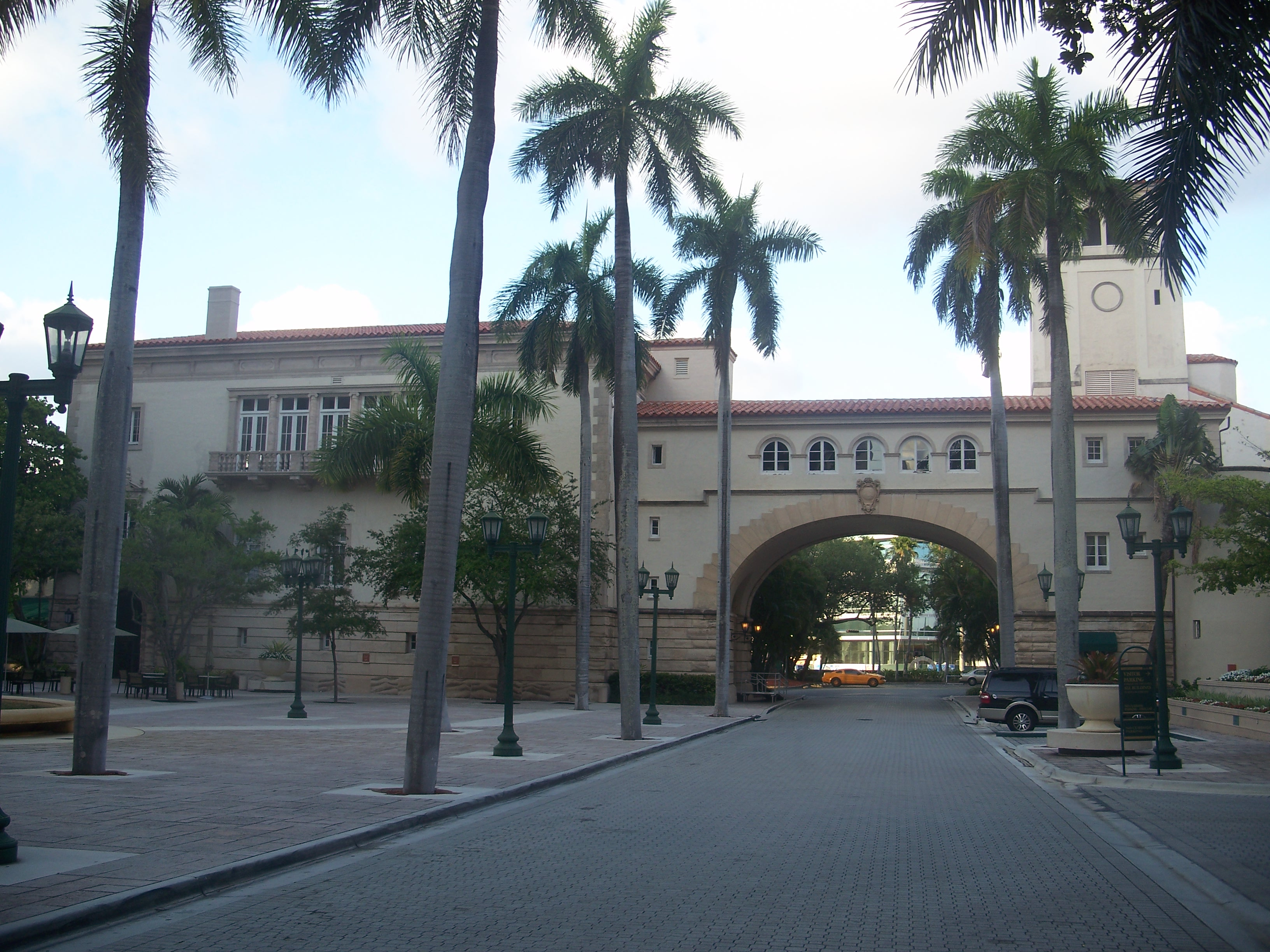
Douglas Entrance to the former location

During the Great Depression, The National Works Projects Administration approved a library and community building be built on land donated by the city and it was completed in 1937. The Coral Rock Building located at 1001 East Ponce de Leon Boulevard, Coral Gables, Florida was the library's location for over 30 years. The building also held the Woman's Club which operated the library until 1953 when the city took over. The building is still deeded today to the Woman's Club since 1950 and is still being used by the organization. The Woman’s club worked to add to the catalog including acquiring 100 books from William Jennings Bryan Private library. The library met the demand for space during the great depression leading to the completion of the library's predecessor in 1937. That building is still deeded to the Woman’s Club today. In 1953, the city took over management of the library, but it was not until 1966 when it entered the Miami Dade Libraries Public Library System. While the City of Miami-Dade manages the library, staffing, and service model the city of Coral Gables Maintains the Ownership of the land and property within.

By the late 1960s, the library had grown to over 51,000 books and was in need of more space. As advocacy for a new building grew, the library found its final home being dedicated on March 23, 1969 at University Drive and Segovia Street. After purchasing the land from the University of Miami. The building was designed by architects Edward Rempe and Wray G. Succop.

In 1966, the decision was made by the City Commission to join the Dade County Library System. The City of Coral Gables retained ownership of the land and building along with original collections, artwork, furniture, and other materials. The Miami-Dade Public Library system provides staff, services, and management. This arrangement continues today as Coral Gables residents receive many benefits from the larger system's resources and the library is open to all. It further freed the Woman's Club from such a large responsibility as they are still in operation today as well.

== Architecture and current building ==
External videos
- Formal dedication of Coral Gables Branch Library, 2014

Groundbreaking began in 1968 for the 28,000 square-foot-structure built to replace the smaller former library structure on Ponce de Leon Boulevard, and the building was inaugurated in 1969.

The building was built from native keystone, quarried in the Florida Keys, Honduran Mahogany doors, Spanish clay floor tiles, and wrought iron fixtures. The building's Spanish influence is apparent, conforming to Coral Gables' guidelines for Mediterranean Revival style. The main reading room has 15-foot high ceilings with exposed wood beams. It was designed by Edward T. Rempe, AIA, and his associate, Wray G. Succop, AIA. The library's interior is a blend of Spanish and contemporary influence.

There is an 15x9 foot glazed ceramic tile mural created by artist Katherine (Kay) Pancoast in 1970 in the Margaret M. Beaton Room inside the Coral Gables Branch Library. The mural depicts local historic major landmarks throughout the city and native flora and fauna. The grounds contain walkways and gardens, including a tropical butterfly garden, and fountains.

In 2000, a substantial renovation of the original garden was designed and implemented by the City of Coral Gables thanks to financial and technical assistance by the Coral Gables Garden Club. The Coral Gables Garden Club was instrumental in the implementation of the butterfly garden and continues to help maintain it. They also donated a sculpture to the library to commemorate the participation of the club which can be found in the lobby of the library.

The library building as well as the Pancoast mural were designated Coral Gables Historic Landmarks by the Coral Gables Historic Preservation Board on May 20, 2010. This was at the request of the Library Advisory Board.

Following a sustained community campaign led by former City Commissioner Pat Keon and fellow former City Commissioner and literacy advocate Jeannett Slesnick, the library building received an extensive two-year renovation in 2021. Taking place from April 2021 to May 2023, the renovation would cost a total of $6.8 million and included a new roof, hurricane-resistant windows, updated electrical and data systems, new furniture and lighting, updated bathrooms, as well as restoring the exposed wooden beams, wrought-iron chandeliers, floor tiles and the ornate wooden base of the main service desk while adding a new quartz countertop.
