= Baptist Health South Florida =

American healthcare organization

- Founded: 1960
- Headquarters: Miami-Dade, United States
- Number of locations: 11 Hospitals (2023)
- Website: baptisthealth.net

Baptist Health South Florida is a faith-based not-for-profit healthcare organization and clinical care network in Miami-Dade, Broward, and Palm Beach counties. Baptist Health has 11 hospitals and in excess of 100 physician practices and outpatient facilities.

The Miami Cancer Institute is located at Baptist Health.

== History ==
The company was founded in 1960 and is headquartered in Coral Gables, Florida. It began as a single hospital on North Kendall Drive in suburban Miami, and is now the second largest employer in the State of Florida with about 23,000 employees. In 2015, the company had $2.4 billion in revenues, $3 billion in financial reserves, and provided $302 million in Community Benefit and charity care. Since 1995, Brian Keeley has been CEO of the company. In 2016 the company created the Baptist Health Care On Demand, which connects patients to physicians through live video on-demand at all hours for non-emergency care.

In 2015, Baptist Health began constructing the $485 million Miami Cancer Institute, which has an affiliation with the Memorial Sloan Kettering Cancer Center. The Institute was opened in 2017 with Michael Zinner as founding CEO, while Guenther Koehne is deputy director as of 2025. Baptist Health is also the parent of companies like AmSurg Baptist Network Alliance, a subsidiary that purchased a majority stake in Northpoint Surgery Center during 2016. During 2015, Baptist Health South Florida saw 75,440 patient admissions, 346,093 emergency department visits, and 289,907 urgent care visits.

Baptist Health South Florida operates community wellness and health programs, free community outreach programs, annual health symposiums, and the Baptist Scholars program, which provides tuition support for individuals looking to train as RNs and work within its system. It also runs employee programs that focus on health maintenance.

In 2019, Baptist Health South Florida formed a joint venture with Houston-based senior living operator Belmont Village Senior Living to develop, own, and operate senior living communities in South Florida. The partnership's first project, Belmont Village Coral Gables, was developed in downtown Coral Gables near the Shops at Merrick Park.

In 2019 and 2020, People magazine named Baptist Heath one of the “50 Companies That Care”. The American Association of Critical-Care Nurses (AACN) has also conferred a silver-level Beacon Award for Excellence on the Neonatal Intensive Care Unit at Baptist Hospital, part of Baptist Health South Florida.

In 2023, Baptist Health South Florida had 11 hospitals in its network, including Baptist Hospital of Miami, Boca Raton Regional Hospital, Baptist Health Hospital Doral, Bethesda Hospital East, Bethesda Hospital West, Doctors Hospital, Homestead Hospital, South Miami Hospital, West Kendall Baptist Hospital, Mariners Hospital, and Fishermen's Hospital. They are located in Miami-Dade, Monroe, and Palm Beach counties.

In January 2026, Baptist Health broke ground on Baptist Health Sunrise Hospital, a $500 million, seven-story hospital in Sunrise and the system's first in Broward County. Scheduled to open in summer 2029, the hospital will have 100 inpatient beds, a 30-bed emergency department, and four robotic-assisted surgical suites.

== Controversies ==
=== Violations and settlements ===
The Department of Justice (DOJ), on behalf of the Office of Inspector General (OIG), agreed to accept $7,775,000 as a settlement amount after Baptist admitted to violations of the federal physician self-referral law (the "Stark Law"). In December 2016, another one of its affiliates, South Miami Hospital, paid $12 million to settle Medicare fraud charges

=== 2021 fundraising ===
In 2021, during the COVID-19 pandemic, the fundraising foundation for Baptist Health South Florida sent emails to 3,000 wealthy donors to inform them those who made six-figure financial contributions would be eligible for vaccines at a time when vaccines were in short supply. When asked by Politico, Baptist Health South Florida refused to divulge how many of the donors were ultimately vaccinated.
