= Coral Gables Woman's Club =

- U.S. National Register of Historic Places
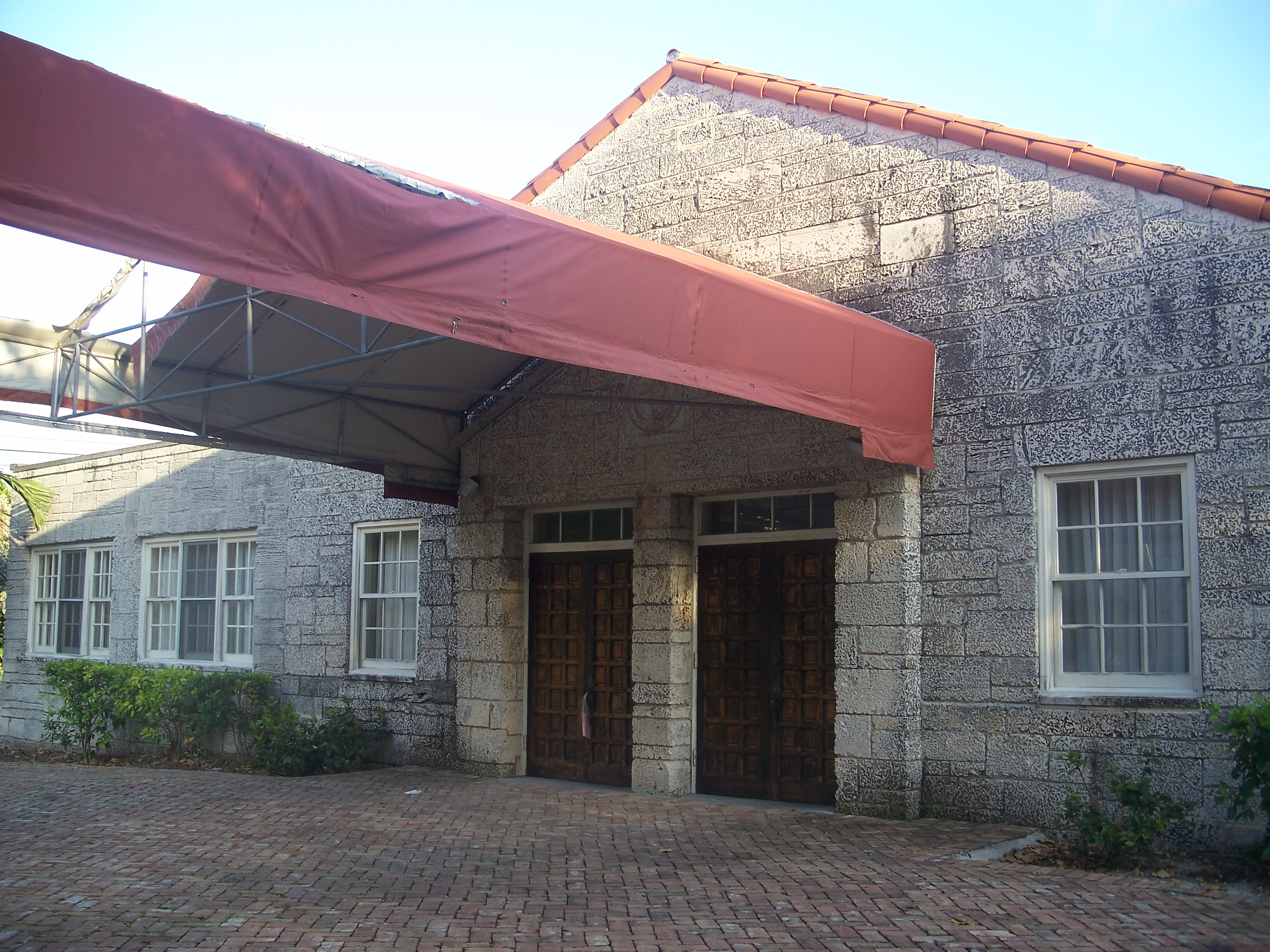
- Coral Gables Woman's Club in Coral Gables, Florida, April 2011
- Location: Coral Gables, Florida
- Coordinates: 25°45′40″N 80°15′28″W
- NRHP reference No.: 90000423
- Added to NRHP: March 27, 1990

The Coral Gables Woman's Club is a historic woman's club in Coral Gables, Florida.

The club is located at 1001 East Ponce de Leon Boulevard. On March 27, 1990, it was added to the U.S. National Register of Historic Places.

== See also ==
- National Register of Historic Places listings in Miami-Dade County, Florida
