= Boca Raton Regional Hospital =

Coordinates: 26.3587487°N 80.1020268°W

Geography
- Location: Boca Raton, Florida, United States

Organization
- Type: Acute and Tertiary Care

Services
- Beds: 400

Links
- Website: Boca Raton Regional Hospital
- Lists: Hospitals in Florida

Boca Raton Regional Hospital is a 400-bed, not-for-profit health care organization located in Boca Raton, Florida. It was established in 1967 and provides patient care in areas such as cardiovascular, oncology, women's health, orthopedics, emergency medicine and the neurosciences. Presently, the hospital has 400 licensed beds, 800 physicians, a nursing and support staff of 2000 and 1200 volunteers. Boca Regional is a member of the Baptist Health South Florida healthcare network.

== History ==
In 1962, Gloria and Robert Drummond's two young children, Debra and James Randall, were fatally poisoned. Had medical treatment been closer than 30 minutes away from Boca Raton, the children's lives may have been saved. The Debbie-Rand Memorial Service League was formed that year with the mission of raising the funds needed to build a medical facility in Boca Raton. Outside consultants were called in who informed the league that Boca Raton would never warrant a hospital. By 1967, the league had raised $3.5 million and “The Miracle on Meadows Road” was opened with 104 beds on July 17 of that year.

On August 19, 2010, the hospital announced that it was changing its name from Boca Raton Community Hospital to its current name.
