= Oliver Sollitt =

American politician

Oliver Sollitt (October 16, 1860 – August 18, 1945) was an American politician and businessman.

Sollitt was born in Chicago, Illinois. He was a businessman and was the head of the Sollitt Construction Company in Chicago. Sollitt served in the Illinois House of Representatives from 1907 to 1911 and was a Republican. Sollitt died at a hospital in Coral Gables, Florida. He had moved to Coral Gables in 1924 after retiring from the construction company.
