= Baptist Hospital of Miami =

Geography
- Location: Miami, Florida, United States
- Coordinates: 25°41′8″N 80°20′22″W

Organization
- Type: Community

Services
- Beds: 948

History
- Founded: 1960

Links
- Website: Baptist Hospital
- Lists: Hospitals in Florida

Baptist Hospital of Miami is a non-profit hospital located in Miami, Florida, United States, operated by Baptist Health South Florida.

Founded in 1960, it is now one of the largest hospitals in the Miami area. The corporate headquarters is located in Coral Gables, Florida, and has facilities throughout Dade County, into the Florida Keys, and in southern Broward County. Baptist Hospital is the largest faith-based non-profit organization hospital in the Miami area, handling a volume of over 100,000 patients a year. The hospital attracts international patients from the Caribbean, Central America and South America. Baptist Hospital is the eleventh hospital in the United States to receive the ”Magnet” of excellence in nursing. The hospital is currently celebrating its 50th year in operation. The Department of Justice (DOJ), on behalf of the Office of Inspector General (OIG), agreed to accept $7,775,000 as a settlement amount after Baptist admitted to violations of the federal physician self referral law (the "Stark Law"). Ranked #1 in Miami-area hospitals in the 2015-16 U.S. News & World Report survey. In December 2016, another one of its affiliates, South Miami Hospital, paid $12 million to settle Medicare fraud charges.
