= Edna Richolson Sollitt =

American pianist

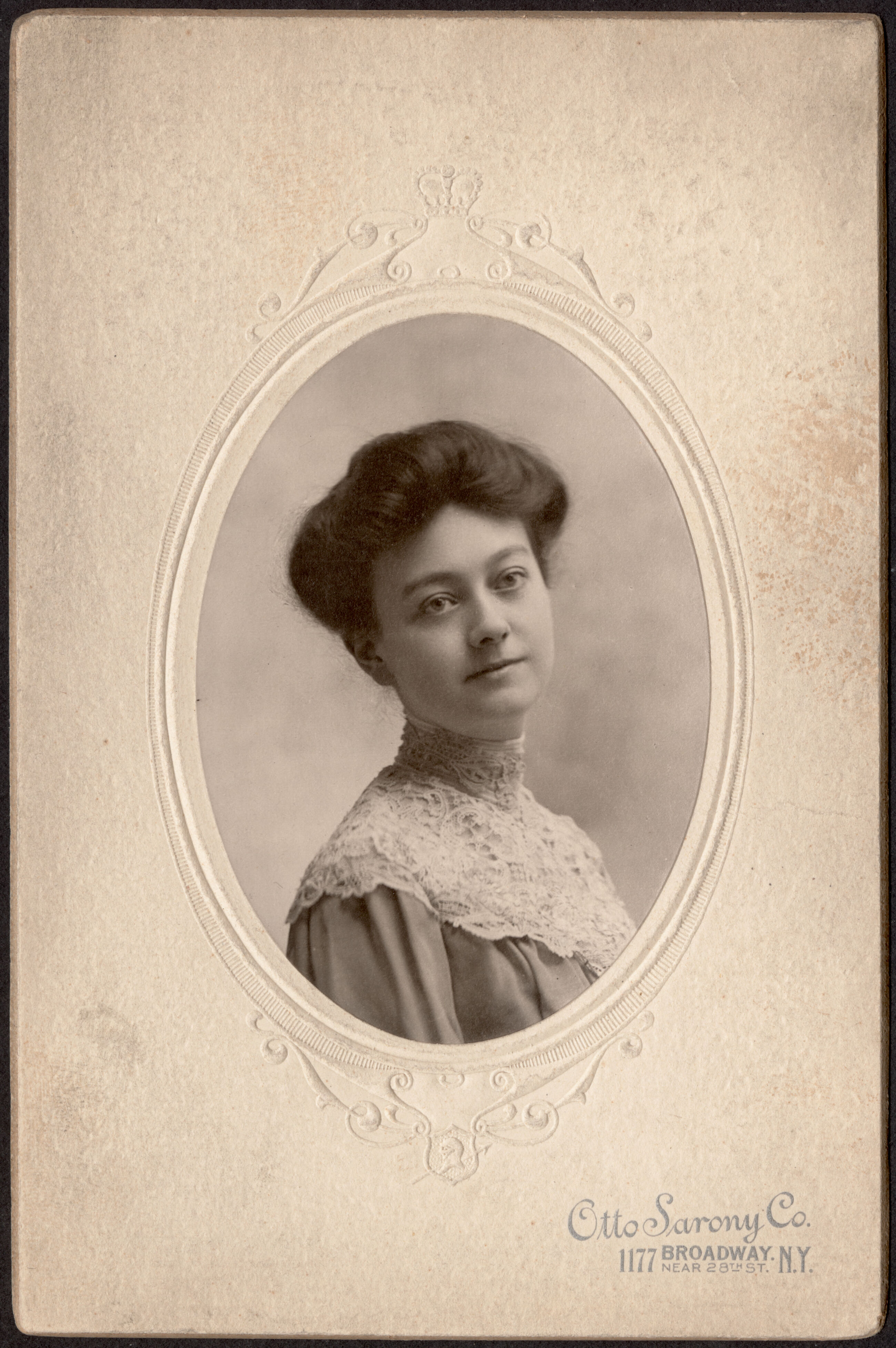
- Edna Richolson Sollitt, from a 1906 publication
- Born: Edna Lucile Richolson; July 6, 1883; Chicago, Illinois, U.S.
- Died: May 2, 1962 (age 78); Santa Barbara, California, U.S.
- Occupations: Pianist, writer

Edna Lucile Richolson Sollitt (July 6, 1883 – May 2, 1962) was an American concert pianist, composer, teacher, and writer.

== Early life and education ==
Sollitt was born in Chicago, the daughter of Benjamin F. Richolson and Ella Daly Richolson. Her father was a lawyer. She graduated from Smith College in 1904. She studied composition and music theory with Max Spicker and Alice Bateman, and studied piano with Josef Lhévinne and Rafael Joseffy.

== Career ==
Sollitt made her New York debut in 1906 as a soloist at Carnegie Hall, with Walter Damrosch conducting the New York Symphony Orchestra. She toured Canada in 1907 with the Chicago Symphony Orchestra. She gave a recital at Kimball Hall in 1920. In 1923 she gave a joint recital with French pianist Maurice Dumesnil. She accompanied baritone Joseph Schwarz in 1924. In 1928 she gave recitals at The Town Hall and at the Institute of Musical Art. "Miss sollitt's range of color and dynamics is fairly limited," reported The Musical Leader in 1928, "but there is a charming sense of proportion in her playing."

Sollitt made piano roll recordings for the Welte-Mignon company. She composed works for piano, including setting poems by Rosetti and Heine to music. She was a member of the Chicago Woman's Club.

== Works ==
- "Troubadours" (1917, piano solo)
- "Respighi Treads the Appian Way" (1928, Musical America)
- Mengelberg & the Symphonic Epoch (1930)
- Dufay to Sweelinck: Netherlands Masters of Music (1933)

== Personal life ==
In 1911, Richolson married Walter Richard Sollitt. He died in 1927. She died in 1962, at the age of 78, in Santa Barbara, California.
