= Coral Gables House =

Historic house in Florida, United States

- U.S. National Register of Historic Places
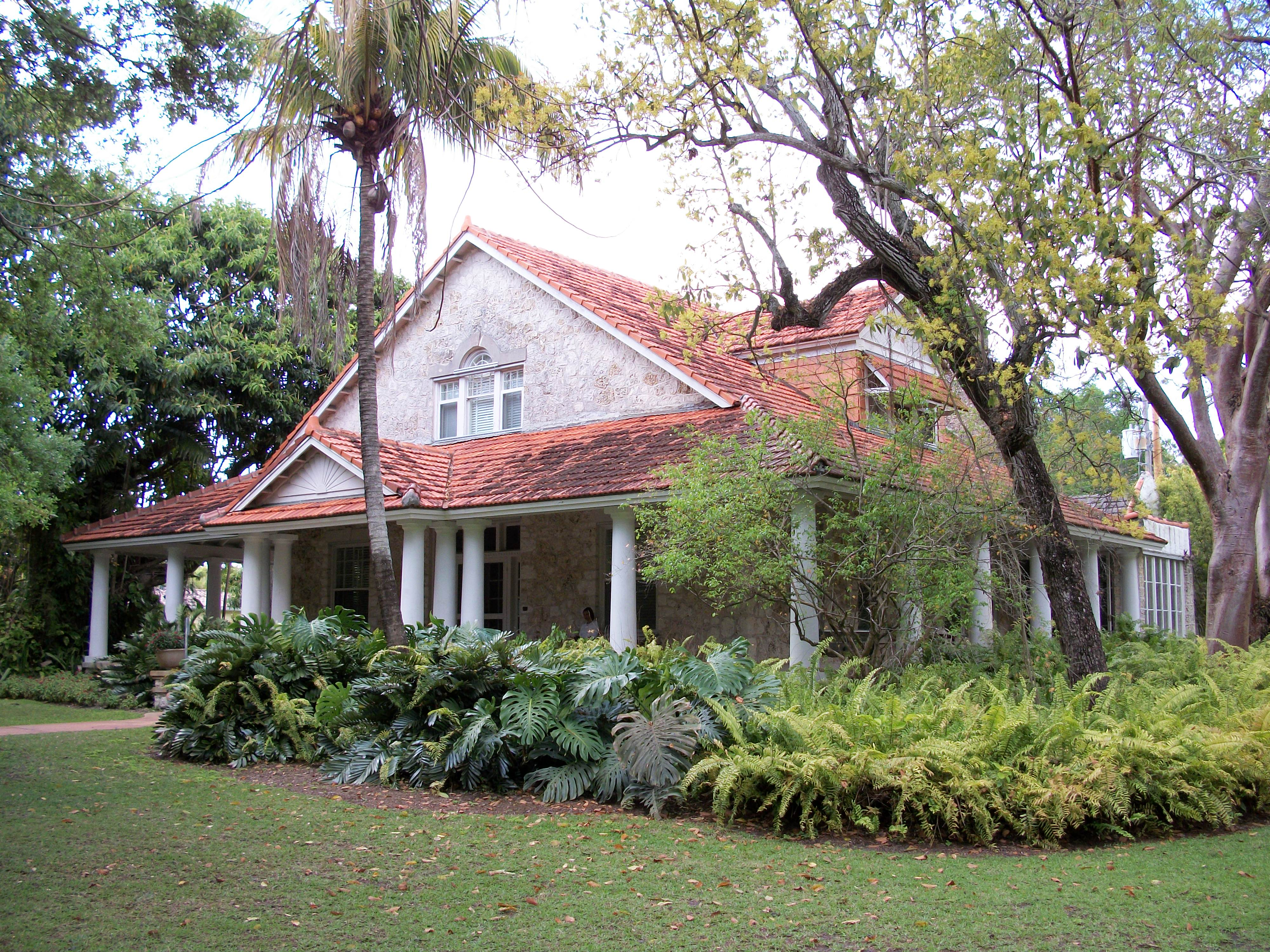
- Merrick House in Coral Gables, Florida, April 2010

- Location within Miami Location within Florida
- Location: Coral Gables, Florida, U.S.
- Coordinates: 25°44′56″N 80°16′26″W
- Area: 2.5 acres (1.0 ha)
- Built: 1906
- Architect: Althea Fink Merrick
- NRHP reference No.: 73000573
- Added to NRHP: April 13, 1973

The Coral Gables Merrick House (also known as the Merrick House or Merrick Manor) is a historic house located at 907 Coral Way in Coral Gables, Florida.

== Description and history ==
It was originally constructed as the childhood residence of George E. Merrick, founder of the city of Coral Gables.

On April 13, 1973, it was added to the National Register of Historic Places, and since then it has been restored to its 1925 appearance by the City of Coral Gables, and is open to the public for tours twice a week.
