= Junior Orange Bowl =

US non-profit organization

The Junior Orange Bowl is a non-profit organization based in Coral Gables, Florida, that holds the Junior Orange Bowl International Youth Festival, a series of events held for the youth of South Florida and the world. The oldest and most popular event of the festival is the Junior Orange Bowl Parade in downtown Coral Gables.

== History ==
Known as "The Largest International Youth Sports and Arts Festival," the Junior Orange Bowl Youth Festival blossomed in 1948 when the first Junior Orange Bowl Parade journeyed through downtown Coral Gables. This was the beginning of a festival that was dedicated to "Celebrating Youth". The Junior Orange Bowl has grown into a year-long youth festival, offering community, academic, and athletic events for youth and families.

The first Junior Orange Bowl Queen, Sandy Wirth, was crowned in 1951 starting a tradition of shaping and mentoring young community leaders. The 9 - 14-year-old girls are judged on poise, personality and presentation. Preliminary pageants are held throughout Miami-Dade, Broward, and Monroe Counties, as one queen, two princesses, and one little sister is chosen to be the Junior Orange Bowl community ambassadors each year. The Royal Court regularly volunteers at community service projects to develop leadership and philanthropic values in addition to their duties to be present and represent the Junior Orange Bowl at festival events.

=== Tennis ===
The sixties marked the introduction of several new events. In 1962 the Junior Orange Bowl International Tennis Championship was established for boys and girls that are 12 & 14 and under. Over the years the draw has included several great players who have gone on to gain stardom on the professional circuit. Tennis greats Chris Evert, Jimmy Connors, Mary Joe Fernandez, Monica Seles, Andre Agassi and Steffi Graf have all played in the Junior Orange Bowl tournament. Today the International Tennis Championship draws over 1,500 players from 75 countries and is widely known as one of the most respected youth tournaments in the world.

=== Golf ===
1964 was the inaugural year for the International Golf Tournament, and the Girl's tournament was added in 1977. Top U.S. and foreign players 18 years and younger compete in this event which is now recognized as one of the world's most prestigious junior golf tournaments. This invitational has produced such professional stars as Andy North, Craig Stadler, Hal Sutton, Mark Calcavecchia, Bob Tway, Billy Mayfair, Willie Wood, and Jose Maria Olazabal. The Golf tournament continues to draw rising champions; Tiger Woods was the 1991 winner.

=== Other events ===
The early and mid-1980s saw more events added to the festival as the Junior Orange Bowl began to develop its academic programs with the Creative Writing and Photography Contests. The National Basketball Classic was added and has grown to include varsity, junior varsity, and middle school tournaments. Another addition has been the Sports Ability Games, which caters to children with physical disabilities and includes a three-day series of events.

1990 was a landmark year in the Junior Orange Bowl's history with the success of the festival's first-ever nighttime parade. Over 150,000 spectators attended this historic event. In 1993, a Pre-Parade show was added to the already exciting parade line-up.

1999 marked the emergence of the Cross Country Invitational, featuring some of South Florida's top middle and senior high school runners.

The 2016 festival season featured the inaugural Robotics Competition. The first Robotics Competition to be hosted in Miami-Dade County, where 101 teams and 500 participants were a part of the event.

The 2018 Festival is marked with the addition of a new International Soccer Cup. The International Soccer Cup will host soccer players ages 8–18 from local, national, and international club teams to compete in this inaugural event.

The 2018 Festival Season is the 70th Anniversary of the Junior Orange Bowl. Currently, a focus is on developing educational and developmental opportunities for the students and athletes in the South Florida community.

== Notable Junior Orange Bowl participants ==
The following sports players and well-known community leaders have participated in Junior Orange Bowl events according to the organization's website:

- Chris Evert (USA) – 1967 Junior Orange Bowl International Tennis Champion, Former WTA World No. 1, 18 Grand Slam championships, inducted into the International Tennis Hall of Fame in 1995.
- Steffi Graf (GER) – 1981 Junior Orange Bowl International Tennis Champion, Former WTA World No. 1, 22 Grand Slam championships, inducted into the International Tennis Hall of Fame in 2004.
- Monica Seles (USA) - 1985 Junior Orange Bowl International Tennis Champion, Former WTA World No. 1, 9 Grand Slam championships, inducted into the International Hall of Fame in 2009.
- Bubba Watson (USA) – 2012 Masters Champion
- Jonathan Vilma – Junior Orange Bowl Basketball Participant, 11-year NFL Veteran, Three NFL Pro Bowls, Super Bowl XLIV Champion.
- Jimmy Connors (USA) – 1964 Junior Orange Bowl International Tennis Champion, Former ATP World No. 1, eight Grand Slam Championships, inducted into the International Tennis Hall of Fame in 1998.
- Andy Roddick (USA) – Former ATP World No.1, 2003 U.S. Open Champion.
- Lexi Thompson (USA) – 2010 Junior Orange Bowl International Golf Champion – Youngest woman to ever win an LPGA event.
- Kim Clijsters (BEL) – Former WTA World No.1, four Grand Slam championships
- Juan Martin del Potro (ARG) – 2002 Junior Orange Bowl International Tennis Champion, 2009 U.S. Open Champion
- Jose Maria Olazabal (ESP) – 1994 and 1999 Masters Champion
- Justine Henin (BEL) – 1996 Junior Orange Bowl International Tennis Champion, Former WTA World No.1, seven Grand Slam championships
- Caroline Wozniacki (DEN) – Former WTA World No.1
- Andy North (USA) – Two USGA U.S. Open championships
- Robin Soderling (SWE) – 10 career ATP titles
- Hal Sutton (USA) – 1984 PGA Championship winner, 14 PGA Tour victories
- Mark Calcavecchia (USA) – 1989 British Open champion, 30 PGA Tour victories.
- Jennifer Capriati (USA) – 1987 Junior Orange Bowl International Tennis Champion, former WTA world No. 1, three Grand Slam championships.
- Gabriela Sabatini (ARG) – 1983 Junior Orange Bowl International Tennis Runner-Up, 1990 U.S. Open Champion, Inducted to International Tennis Hall of Fame in 2006.
- Tommy Haas (GER/USA) – 1992 Junior Orange Bowl International Tennis Champion, 14 ATP Titles.

== Mission statement ==
The Junior Orange Bowl serves the South Florida community and the youth of the world by providing wholesome, competitive, and multicultural experiences.
