= Coral Gables, Florida =

City in Miami-Dade County, Florida

Coral Gables
- City
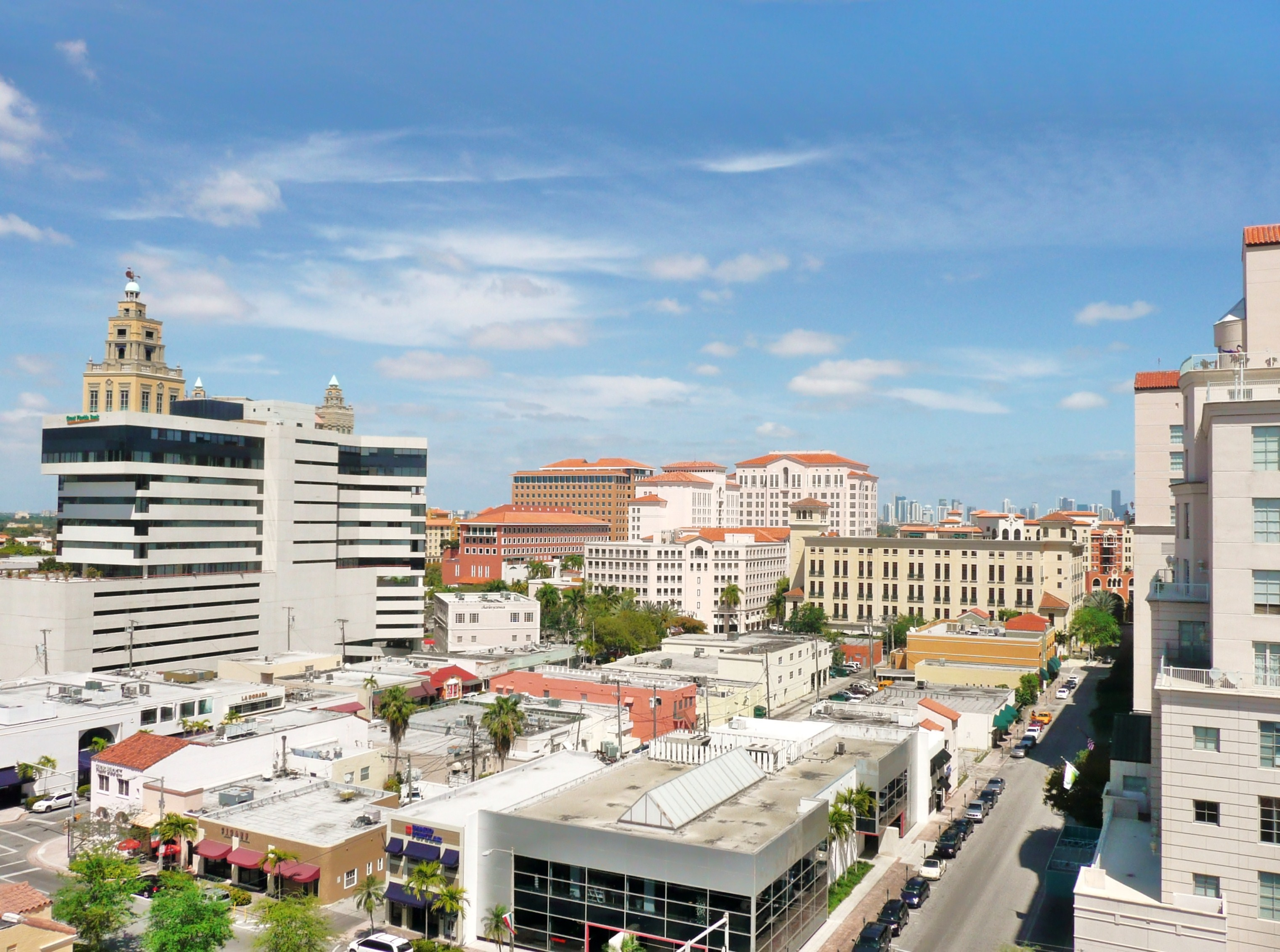
- Coral Gables (in foreground) with Downtown Miami visible (in background) in 2010

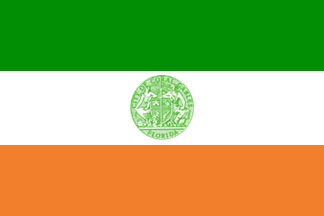
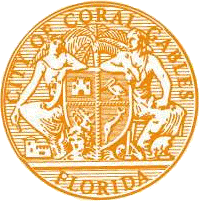
- Flag Seal
- Nicknames: "The City Beautiful", "The Gables"
- Location of Coral Gables in Miami-Dade County, Florida (left) and of Miami-Dade County in Florida (right)

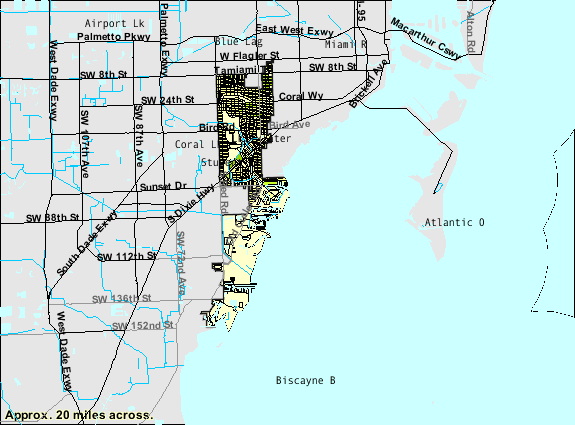
- U.S. Census Bureau map showing city limits
- Coordinates: 25°40′30″N 80°15′20″W
- Country: United States
- State: Florida
- County: Miami-Dade
- Incorporated: April 29, 1925

Government
  - Type: Commission-Manager
  - Mayor: Vince C. Lago
  - Vice Mayor: Rhonda A. Anderson
  - Commissioners: Melissa Castro, Richard D. Lara, and Ariel Fernandez
  - City Manager: Alberto Parjus
  - City Clerk: Billy Y. Urquia

Area
  - Total: 37.31 sq mi (96.64 km^{2})
  - Land: 12.93 sq mi (33.48 km^{2})
  - Water: 24.39 sq mi (63.16 km^{2})
- Elevation: 0 ft (0 m)

Population (2020)
  - Total: 49,248
  - Estimate (2022): 49,193
  - Rank: 61st in Florida
  - Density: 3,805.5/sq mi (1,469.32/km^{2})
- Time zone: UTC-5 (EST)
  - Summer (DST): UTC-4 (EDT)
- ZIP codes: 33133, 33134, 33143, 33144, 33146, 33155, 33156, 33158
- Area codes: 305, 786, 645
- FIPS code: 12-14250
- GNIS feature ID: 2404126
- Website: coralgables.com

Coral Gables is a city in Miami-Dade County, Florida, United States. The city is part of the Miami metropolitan area of South Florida and is located 7 miles (11 km) southwest of downtown Miami. As of the 2020 U.S. census, it had a population of 49,248.

The city is a Mediterranean-themed planned community known for its historic and affluent character reinforced by its strict zoning, popular landmarks, and tourist sights.

The University of Miami is located in Coral Gables. With 16,479 faculty and staff as of 2021, the university is the largest employer in Coral Gables and the second-largest employer in all of Miami-Dade County.

== History ==
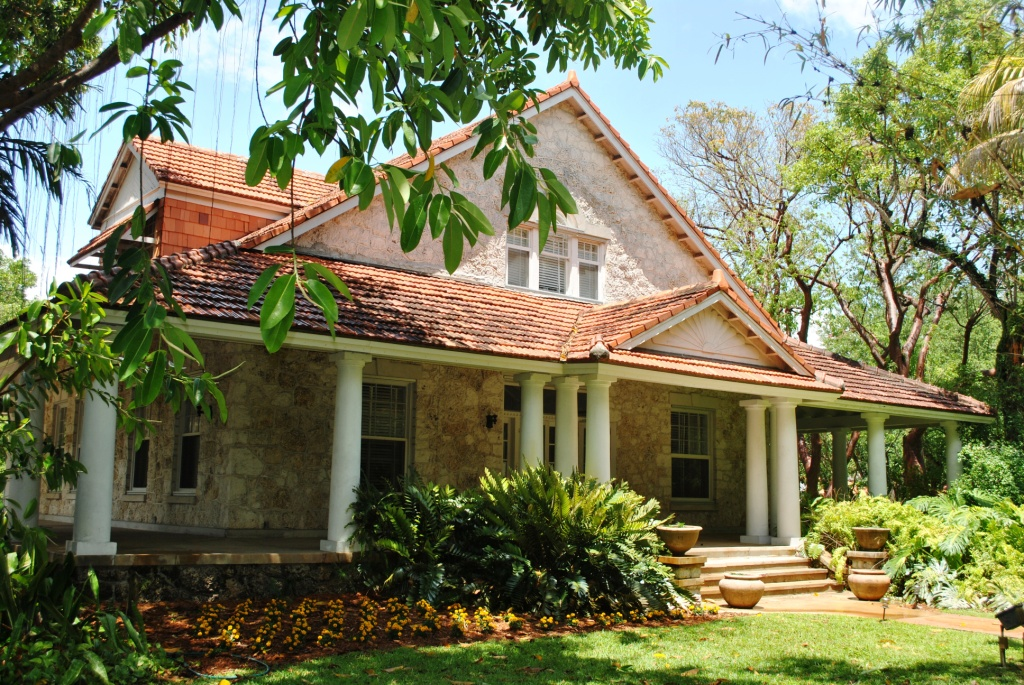
George Merrick's family home, originally known as Coral Gables

Coral Gables was formally incorporated as a city on April 29, 1925. It is a planned community based on the popular early 20th-century City Beautiful Movement and is known for its strict zoning regulations. The city was developed by George Merrick, a real estate developer from Pennsylvania, during the Florida land boom of the 1920s. Merrick named the development after his family's home, a plantation built in the early 1900s. The main building of their estate had been named Coral Gables because it was built with Miami Limestone (commonly called "coral rock") and coral-colored Ludowici tile. Much of the early construction in Coral Gables was carried out by Bahamian immigrant laborers, many of whom were skilled stonemasons experienced in working with the local coral rock used in many of the city’s early buildings and infrastructure.

The city's architecture is almost entirely Mediterranean Revival style, mandated in the original plan, with an emphasis on Spanish influence in particular, such as the Coral Gables Congregational Church, donated by Merrick. The domed Catholic Church of the Little Flower was built later, in a similar Spanish Renaissance style.

Early in the city's planning and development, Merrick shared his vision for Coral Gables as "a most extraordinary opportunity for the building of 'Castles in Spain'," according to Coral Gables historian Arva Moore Parks. Merrick's success in executing this vision for the city would catch the attention of Spain's king, Alfonso XIII, who awarded Merrick the Order of Isabella the Catholic for his support of Spanish culture in Coral Gables.

By 1926, the city covered 10,000 acres (4,000 ha) and had netted $150 million in sales, with over $100 million spent on development. That year also had the opening of the Biltmore Hotel and Golf Course, a major landmark in city.

Merrick meticulously designed the city with distinct zones. For example, he designed the downtown commercial district to be only four blocks wide and more than 2 miles (3.2 km) long. The main artery, now known as Miracle Mile, bisected the business district. The city used to have an electric trolley system, which was ended as a result of the growing use of automobiles, but now a new free circulator trolley system, initiated in November 2003, runs down Ponce de León Boulevard. Another distinctive and character-defining feature of the city planned by Merrick are the themed Coral Gables Villages that date to the 1920s and were designed to expand the city's architecture beyond Spanish influence to include Italian, French, and Dutch South African, among others.

In 1925, roughly simultaneous to the founding of Coral Gables, the University of Miami was constructed on 240 acres (97 ha) of land just west of U.S. Route 1, about 2 miles south of downtown Coral Gables. By the fall of 1926, the first class of 372 students enrolled at the university.

During World War II, many Navy pilots and mechanics were trained and housed in Coral Gables.

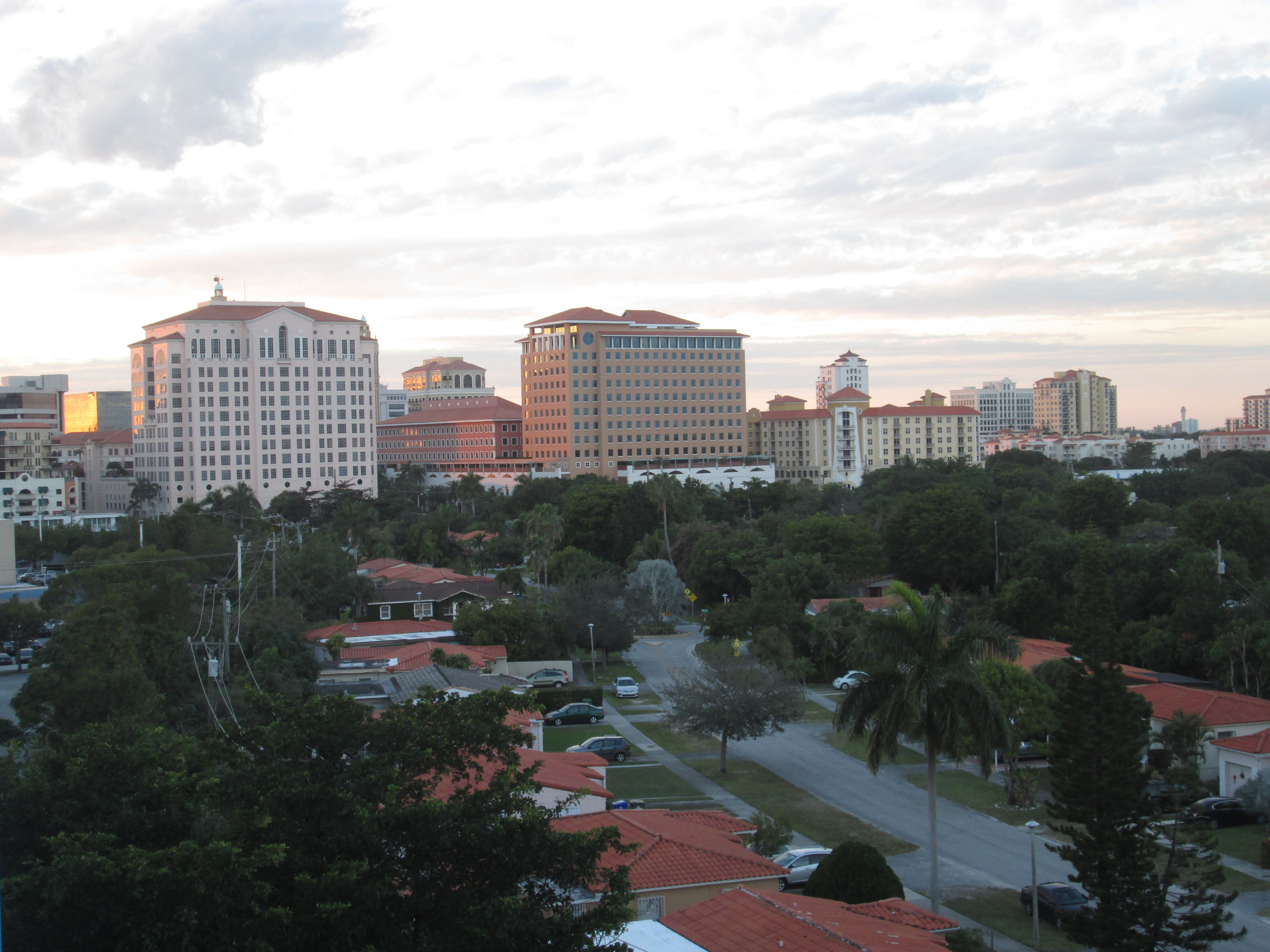
The skyline of Coral Gables in December 2014

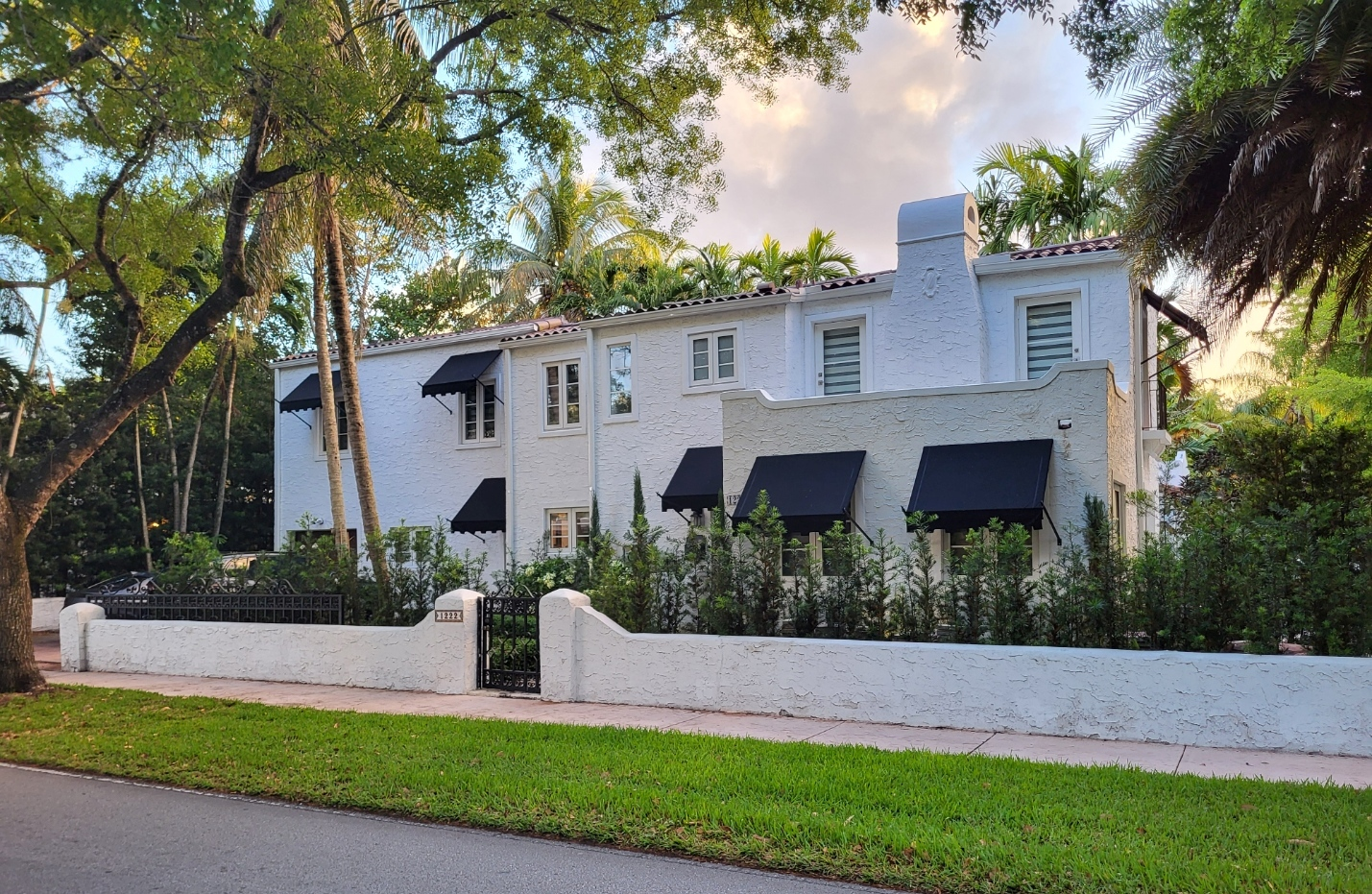
A Spanish-style house built in 1925, typical of the Mediterranean-inspired architecture that has shaped Coral Gables since its 1925 founding

Coral Gables has traditionally placed high priority on historic preservation. The city passed its first preservation ordinance in 1973, as many of its founding structures from the 1920s began to reach their 50th anniversaries. Further ordinances were enacted in the 1980s establishing the Historic Preservation Board and in the 1990s establishing the Historic Preservation Department, now called the Historical Resources and Cultural Arts Department.

As part of the city's historic preservation program, the Historical Resources Department is tasked with researching and identifying significant properties and local landmarks for listing in the Coral Gables Registry of Historic Places, as well as on national historic registers. The department also reviews modifications to locally designated landmarks and initiates grant proposals. The Historic Preservation Board is a quasijudicial body that votes on local landmark designations and other issues pertaining to the historic character of the city.

== Geography ==
According to the U.S. Census Bureau, the city has a total area of 37.2 square miles (96 km^{2}), of which 24.0 square miles (62 km^{2}) (64.64%) are covered by water.

=== Climate ===
Coral Gables has a tropical climate, similar to that found in much of the Caribbean. It is part of the only region in the 48 contiguous states that falls under that category. More specifically, it generally has a tropical monsoon climate (Köppen climate classification Am).

== Demographics ==
Historical population
Census	Pop.	Note	%±
1930	5,697		—
1940	8,294		45.6%
1950	19,837		139.2%
1960	34,793		75.4%
1970	42,494		22.1%
1980	43,241		1.8%
1990	40,091		−7.3%
2000	42,249		5.4%
2010	46,780		10.7%
2020	49,248		5.3%
2022 (est.)	49,193	▼	−0.1%
U.S. Decennial Census; 1930–1970 1980 1990; 2000 2010 2020 2022

=== Racial and ethnic composition ===
Historical demographics	2020	2010	2000	1990	1980
White (non-Hispanic)	30.6%	40.1%	47.7%	53.2%	65.1%
Hispanic or Latino	58.8%	53.6%	46.6%	41.8%	29.6%
Black or African American (non-Hispanic)	4.8%	2.5%	3.1%	3.1%	4.0%
Asian and Pacific Islander (non-Hispanic)	2.6%	2.7%	1.7%	1.7%	1.3%
Native American (non-Hispanic)	< 0.1%	< 0.1%	0.1%	0.1%	1.3%
Some other race (non-Hispanic)	0.7%	0.2%	0.2%	0.1%	1.3%
Two or more races (non-Hispanic)	2.5%	0.9%	0.7%	N/A	N/A
Population	49,248	46,780	42,249	40,091	43,241

=== Demographics ===
Demographic characteristics	2020	2010	2000	1990	1980
Households	21,868	20,266	17,849	15,460	16,429
Persons per household	2.25	2.31	2.37	2.59	2.63
Sex Ratio	87.6	89.7	87.6	90.0	88.0
Ages 0–17	16.6%	17.9%	17.4%	15.5%	17.2%
Ages 18–64	63.3%	66.5%	66.8%	67.1%	66.0%
Ages 65 +	20.1%	15.6%	15.8%	17.4%	16.8%
Median age	41.9	38.8	38.1	37.0	36.1
Population	49,248	46,780	42,249	40,091	43,241

Economic indicators
2017–21 American Community Survey	Coral Gables	Miami-Dade County	Florida
Median income	$63,061	$32,513	$34,367
Median household income	$113,623	$57,815	$61,777
Poverty Rate	7.5%	15.7%	13.1%
High school diploma	97.2%	82.5%	89.0%
Bachelor's degree	71.5%	31.7%	31.5%
Advanced degree	37.8%	11.9%	11.7%

=== Language ===
Language spoken at home (Note: Language spoken at home among residents at least 5 years old; only languages (or language groups) which at least 2% of residents have spoken at any time since 1980 are mentioned)	2015 (Note: Refers to 2013–2017 American Community Survey data; the last Decennial Census where language data was collected was in the 2000 census)	2010 (Note: Refers to 2008–2012 American Community Survey data; the last Decennial Census where language data was collected was in the 2000 census)	2000	1990	1980
English	40.0%	39.4%	43.1%	51.8%	63.4%
Spanish or Spanish Creole	53.5%	54.7%	50.2%	42.8%	30.3%
Other Languages	6.5%	5.9%	6.7%	5.4%	6.3%

=== Nativity ===
Nativity	2015 (Note: Refers to 2013–2017 American Community Survey data; the last Decennial Census where foreign-born population data was collected was in the 2000 census)	2010 (Note: Refers to 2008–2012 American Community Survey data; the last Decennial Census where foreign-born population data was collected was in the 2000 census)	2000	1990	1980
% population native-born	61.5%	62.3%	62.1%	64.4%	69.9%
... born in the United States	57.5%	58.3%	58.8%	61.2%	67.9%
... born in Puerto Rico or Island Areas	2.0%	2.0%	1.8%	1.6%	2.0%
... born to American parents abroad	2.0%	2.0%	1.5%	1.7%	2.0%
% population foreign-born (Note: Only countries of birth which at least 3% of residents were born in at any time since 1980 are mentioned)	38.5%	37.7%	37.9%	35.6%	30.1%
... born in Cuba	15.0%	16.4%	19.2%	20.3%	15.1%
... born in other countries	23.5%	21.3%	18.7%	15.3%	15.0%

=== 2020 census ===
As of the 2020 census, Coral Gables had a population of 49,248. The median age was 41.9 years; 16.6% of residents were under 18 and 20.1% were 65 or older. For every 100 females, there were 87.6 males, and for every 100 females 18 and over, there were 85.0 males 18 and over.

All of the residents lived in urban areas, while none lived in rural areas.

Of the 19,074 households in Coral Gables, 26.0% had children under 18 living in them, 48.8% were married-couple households, 16.4% were households with a male householder and no spouse or partner present, and 29.7% were households with a female householder and no spouse or partner present. About 30.9% of all households were made up of individuals, and 13.0% had someone living alone who was 65 or older.

The city had 21,868 housing units, of which 12.8% were vacant. The homeowner vacancy rate was 2.7% and the rental vacancy rate was 14.0%.

Racial composition as of the 2020 census
Race	Number	Percent
White	21,154	43.0%
Black or African American	2,462	5.0%
American Indian and Alaska Native	71	0.1%
Asian	1,275	2.6%
Native Hawaiian and other Pacific Islander	45	0.1%
Some other race	4,093	8.3%
Two or more races	20,148	40.9%
Hispanic or Latino (of any race)	28,949	58.8%

=== 2010 census ===
According to the 2010 United States census, 46,780 people, 16,453 households, and 10,377 families were residing in the city. In 2010, 11.4% of households were vacant.

=== 2000 census ===
In 2000, 24.45% had children under 18 living with them, 61.11% were family households, 17.3% had a female householder with no husband present, and 38.89% were not families. The average household size was 2.36, and the average household had 1.68 vehicles.

=== 2022 estimate ===
In 2022, the U.S. Census Bureau estimated that the median household income in the city was $118,203; the estimated per capita income was $74,780. Some 9.5% of the citizens were thought to be living below the poverty line.

== Economy ==
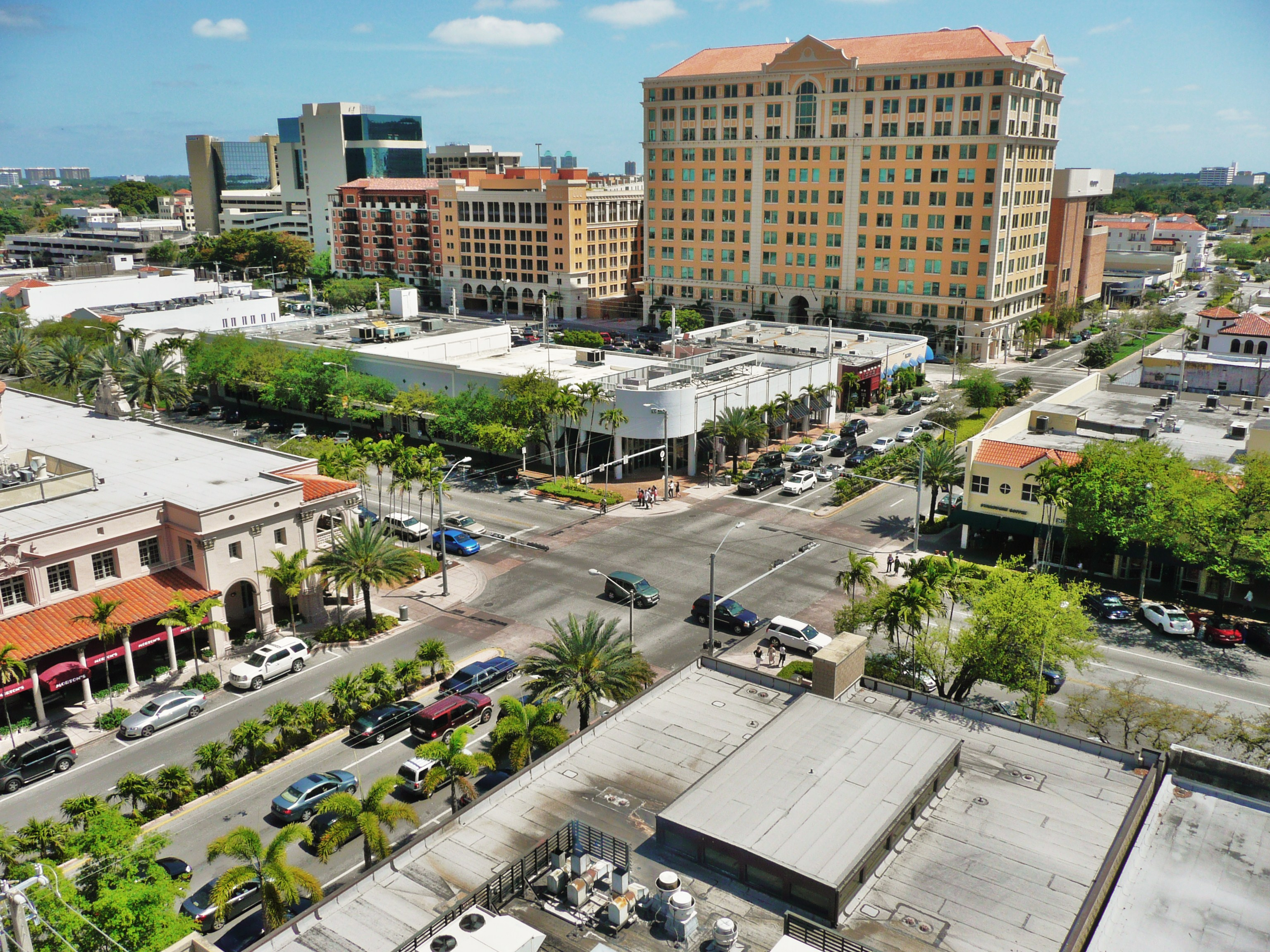
Miracle Mile and Ponce de Leon Boulevard in Coral Gables in April 2010

Major economic contributors to Coral Gables include:

- The University of Miami is the largest employer in Coral Gables since the city's founding, with over 20,000 faculty and staff employees as of 2024.
- Baptist Hospital of Miami is the second-largest employer in Coral Gables.
- Bacardi has its United States headquarters with 300 employees at 2701 Le Jeune Road.
- Intelsat has its Latin American headquarters in Suite 1100 at One Alhambra Plaza.
- Fresh Del Monte Produce is headquartered in Coral Gables.
- ExxonMobil has a marine-fuels operation in Suite 900 at One Alhambra Plaza in Coral Gables
- MasTec, Inc., the second-largest Hispanic-owned company in the nation, is located at 800 South Douglas Road.
- Odebrecht has over 300 employees at its location at 201 Alhambra Circle.
- American Airlines maintains the Ponce de Leon Travel Center at 901 Ponce De Leon Boulevard.
- Dolphin Entertainment is an independent film studio in Coral Gables.
- FIFA maintains its North American headquarters in Coral Gables in preparation for the 2026 FIFA World Cup, which will include Miami.

=== Tourism ===
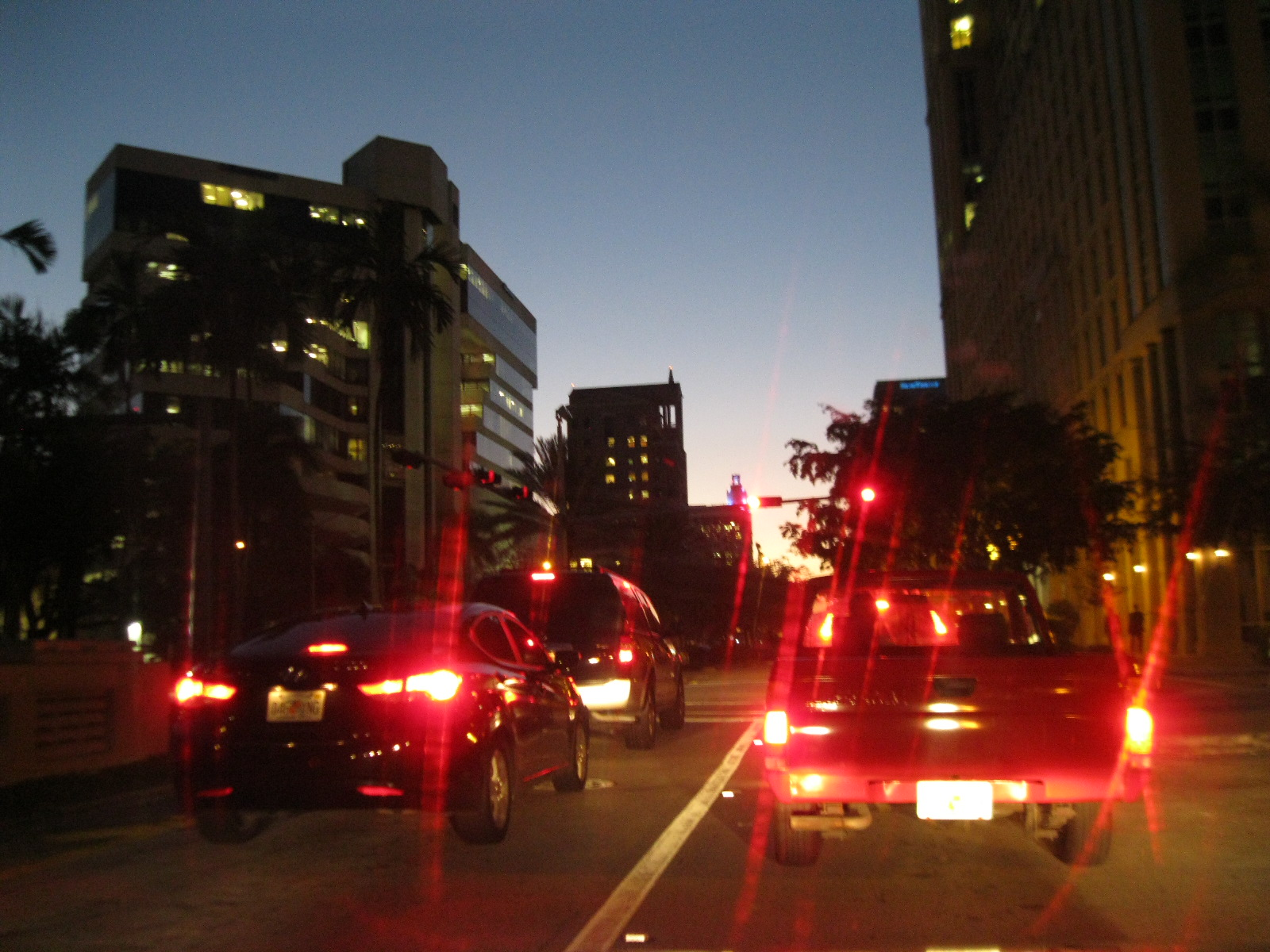
Coral Gables at night in January 2014

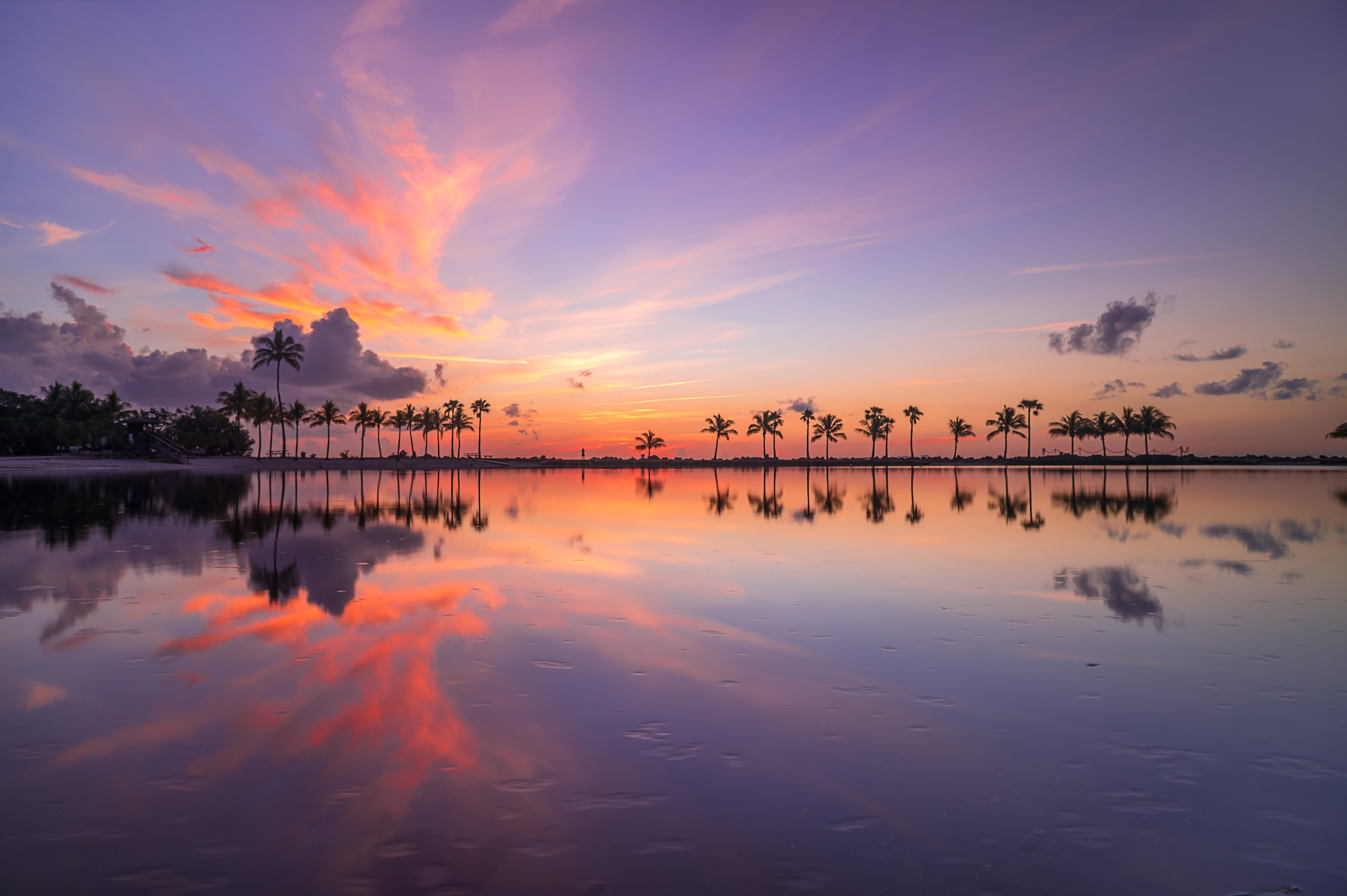
Matheson Hammock Park in July 2015

Located 4 miles from Miami International Airport, Coral Gables has around 140 dining establishments and gourmet shops and many notable international retailers. Among Coral Gables landmarks are the Venetian Pool, Douglas Entrance, and Miami Biltmore hotel.

== Arts and culture ==
=== Places of interest ===
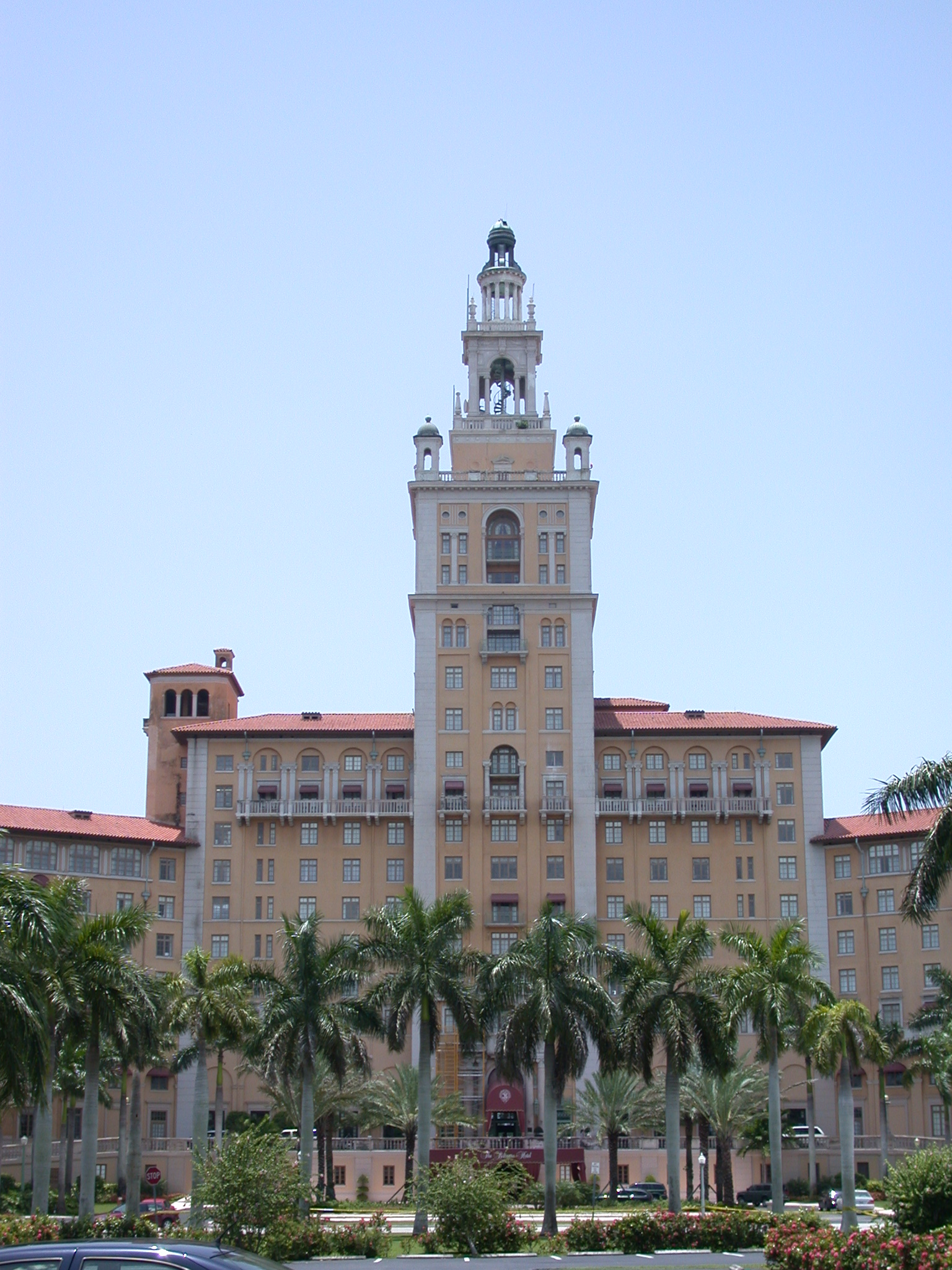
Miami Biltmore Hotel, built in 1926 in Coral Gables and pictured in March 2011

- Coral Gables Villages
- Coral Way
- Fairchild Tropical Botanic Garden
- Miami Biltmore Hotel
- Miracle Mile
- Riviera Schools
- Shops at Merrick Park
- University of Miami
- Venetian Pool

=== Festivals and events ===
- Festival of Art, University of Miami, held in January
- Carnival on the Mile, Miracle Mile, held in February/March
- Junior Orange Bowl Festival, held in December–January

=== Public libraries ===
Miami-Dade Public Library System operates the Coral Gables Branch Library in Coral Gables.

== Education ==
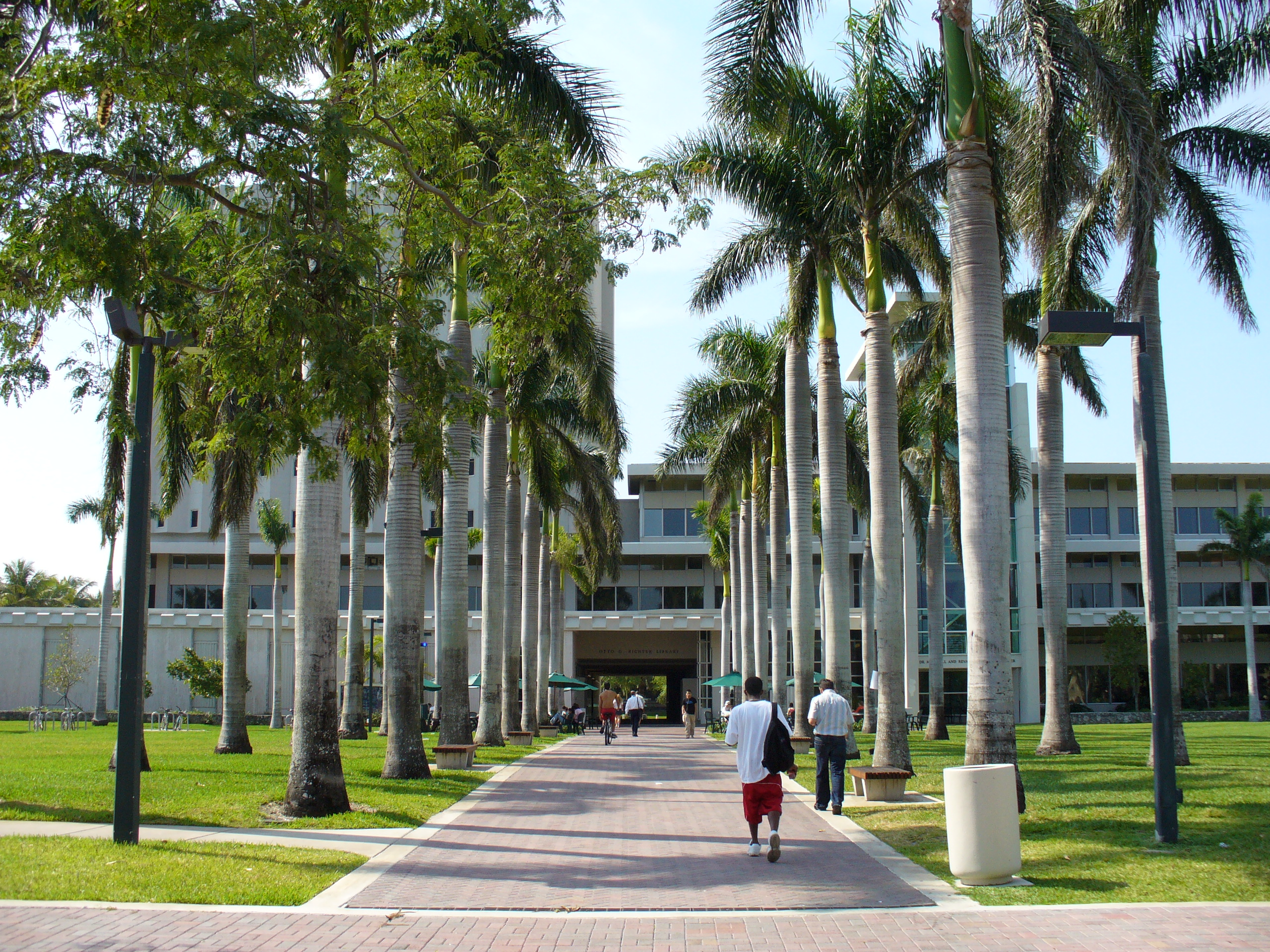
The University of Miami, the largest employer in Coral Gables, in April 2006

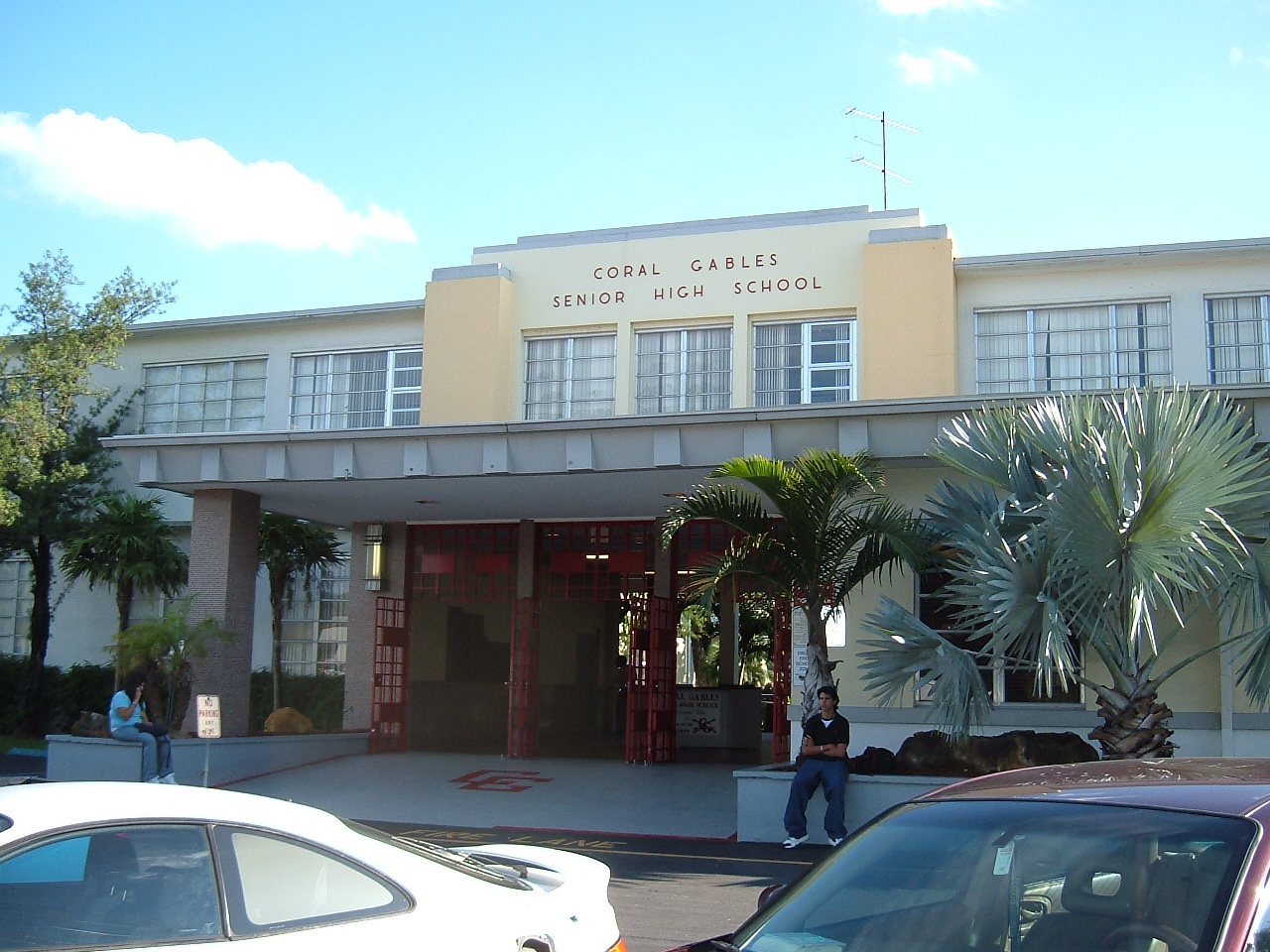
Coral Gables Senior High School in October 2006

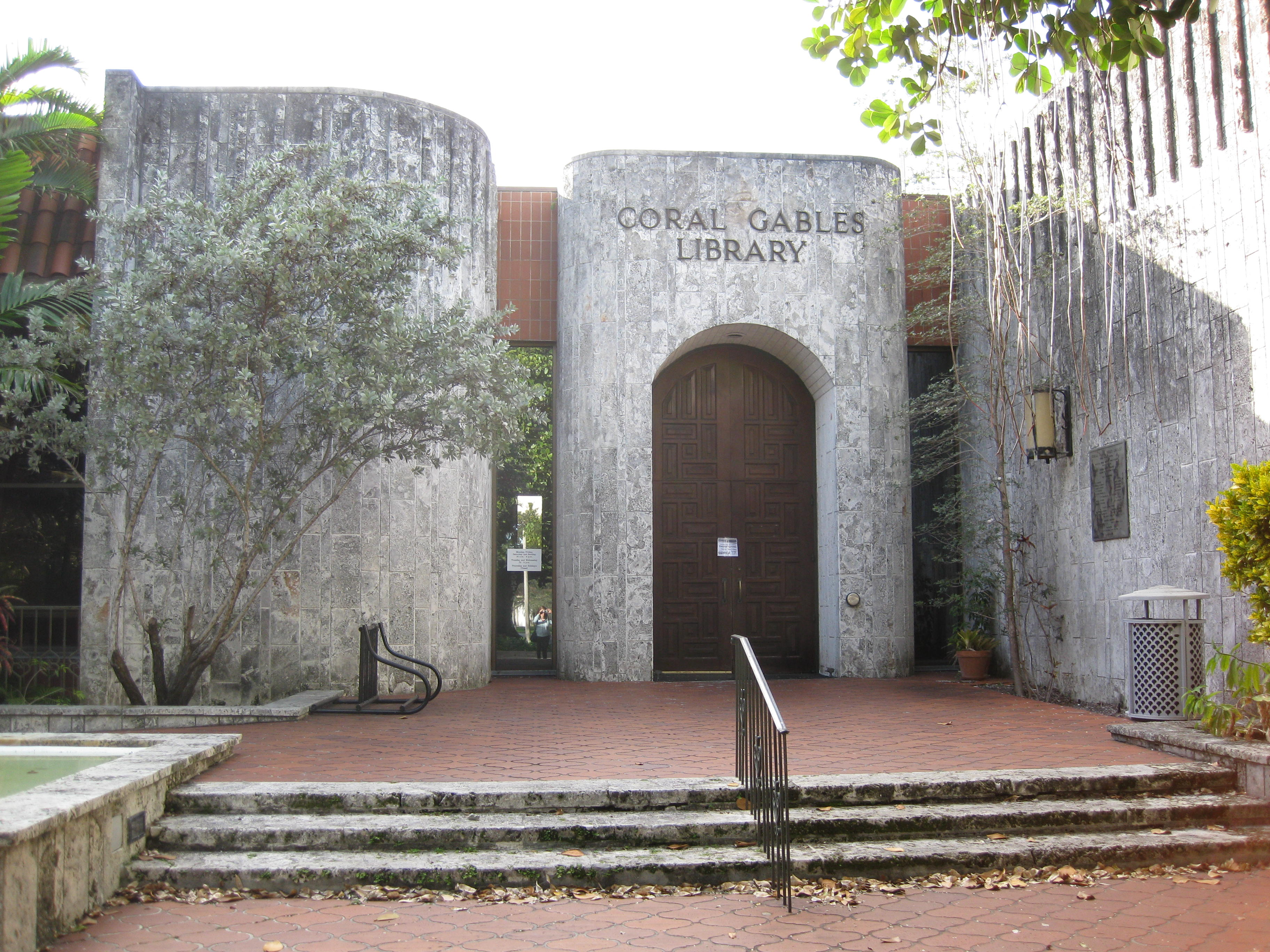
Coral Gables Branch Library in November 2014

=== University of Miami ===
The University of Miami, a private university ranked in the top tier of national universities, with particular national status in the fields of business, engineering, law, marine science, medicine, communications, and music, is located in Coral Gables.

=== Primary and secondary schools ===
==== Public schools ====
Coral Gables schools are part of Miami-Dade County Public Schools, which serve Miami-Dade County. The district has several high schools in Coral Gables, most notably Coral Gables Senior High School and International Studies Preparatory Academy, both of which educate students in grades nine through 12. It also has a kindergarten-grade 8 school, Coral Gables Preparatory Academy (formerly Coral Gables Elementary School), with two campuses, including a historic campus located on Ponce de Leon Boulevard. Henry S. West Laboratory Elementary is another school for kindergarten-grade 6. Also, it has two middle schools: George Washington Carver Middle School located on Lincoln Drive and Ponce de Leon Middle School located across from the University of Miami on the east side of U.S. Route 1 on Augusto Street. Present-day George Washington Carver Middle School was moved to its current location on Grand Avenue on land donated by George Merrick. When Carver died in 1942, the school was renamed in his honor.

==== Private schools ====
Gulliver Academy, Marian C. Krutulis Campus, a prekindergarten-grade 8 school that is a member of Gulliver Schools, is within Coral Gables. The management offices of Gulliver Schools were formerly located in Coral Gables. The lower campus of Riviera Schools is located in Coral Gables.

The historic St. Theresa Catholic School, a prekindergarten-grade 8 school, is located near Coral Gables Biltmore Hotel. St. Philip's Episcopal School, the French-American School of Miami, and St. Thomas Episcopal Parish School, all prekindergarten-grade 5 schools, are also located in Coral Gables. Coral Gables Preparatory Academy, a private kindergarten-grade 8 school, is located in Coral Gables.

== Media ==
The Miami Herald is the region's predominant daily newspaper. Coral Gables has one newspaper, Coral Gables News Tribune, which is published twice monthly and covers local and regional news and one weekly newspaper that is part of the portfolio of Miami Community Newspapers publications.

At the University of Miami in Coral Gables, The Miami Hurricane, the official student newspaper, is published weekly each Tuesday.

Coral Gables is part of the Miami-area media market.

=== Film location ===
Numerous movies have been filmed fully or partially in Coral Gables, including Nude on the Moon (1961), Goldilocks and the Three Bares (1963), Jimmy, the Boy Wonder (1966), I Eat Your Skin (1971), Shock Waves (1977), Absence of Malice (1981), The Mean Season (1985), Miami Rhapsody (1995), Bad Boys (1995), The Perez Family (1995), Fair Game (1995), Two Much (1995), Blood and Wine (1996), Curdled (1996), Wild Things (1998), The Hours (2002), My Sexiest Year (2007), Dostna (2008), Posthumous (2012), and others.

== Infrastructure ==
=== Transportation ===
Coral Gables is served by Miami Metrobus, and by Miami Metrorail at University Station.

Coral Gables provides a free trolley service.

== Notable people ==
- Doris Hart former world number-one tennis player and winner of 34 Grand Slam titles
- Marc Anthony, salsa singer
- Juan Alvarez, former professional pitcher for the Anaheim Angels, Florida Marlins, and Texas Rangers
- Zach Banks, racing driver
- Dave Barry, Pulitzer Prize-winning humorist
- Shane Battier, former professional basketball player, Houston Rockets, Memphis Grizzlies, and Miami Heat
- Bruce R. Berkowitz, mutual fund manager
- Kevin Buckler, race car driver and founder of the Racer's Group
- Columba Bush, former First Lady of Florida
- Jeb Bush, 43rd Governor of Florida
- Marty Bystrom, former professional pitcher for the New York Yankees and Philadelphia Phillies
- Maxine Clark, founder of Build-A-Bear Workshop
- Colleen Corby, model
- Alice Dixson, actress, commercial model, and former beauty queen
- Gail Edwards, actress, It's a Living, Blossom, and Full House
- Gus Gandarillas, former professional pitcher for the Milwaukee Brewers
- Juan Ramón Jiménez, Nobel Prize-winning author
- Dane Johnson, former professional pitcher for the Chicago White Sox, Oakland Athletics, and Toronto Blue Jays
- José José, pop singer
- Nancy Kopp, former treasurer of Maryland
- Soia Mentschikoff, legal scholar and law professor at Harvard Law School
- Marilyn Milian, judge, The People's Court
- Thurston Moore, singer, songwriter, and guitarist of Sonic Youth
- Alonzo Mourning, former basketball player for the Charlotte Hornets, Miami Heat, and New Jersey Nets
- Jesús Permuy, architect, human-rights advocate, businessman, and radio host
- Marta Permuy, art patron and promoter
- Mimi Rogers, actress
- Baruj Salinas, international artist
- Jon Secada, Latin pop singer
- Roy Sekoff, founding editor of the Huffington Post
- George D. Shea, U.S. Army major general
- Don Slesnick, former mayor (2001-2011), attorney, community advocate
- Jeannett Slesnick, philanthropist, community advocate, publisher, former commissioner
- Pamela Smart, murderer convicted in a notorious case
- Oliver Sollitt, Illinois state representative and businessman
- Jonathan Vilma, former professional football player for the New Orleans Saints and New York Jets
- Lester J. Whitlock, U.S. Army major general
- Kathryn Slaughter Wittichen, clubwoman and socialite
- Dewing Woodward, artist, philanthropist, and first art professor at the University of Miami

== Sister cities ==
Coral Gables' sister cities are:

- Aix-en-Provence, France
- Cartagena, Colombia
- Antigua Guatemala, Guatemala
- Santa Tecla, El Salvador
- Seville, Spain
- San Isidro, Argentina

Coral Gables' emeritus cities are:

- El Puerto de Santa María, Spain
- Province of Pisa, Italy
- Granada, Spain
- Quito, Ecuador (Note: On their website, the City of Coral Gables also lists Andorra la Vella as a "Friendship City")

== Diplomatic missions ==
Countries with consulates in Coral Gables include: Barbados, Colombia, El Salvador, Italy, Peru, Spain, Monaco, St. Lucia, and Uruguay.

Countries with honorary consulates in Coral Gables include: Australia, Belize, Hungary, Senegal, St. Kitts and Nevis, Togo, and Thailand. The Taipei Economic and Cultural Office maintains Taiwan's diplomatic mission here.

== In popular culture ==
- The 2014 adventure game A Golden Wake is based on the founding and development of Coral Gables in the 1920s.
