= Miami Intermodal Center =

Ground transportation hub for Miami International Airport

Miami Airport ● Miami International Airport

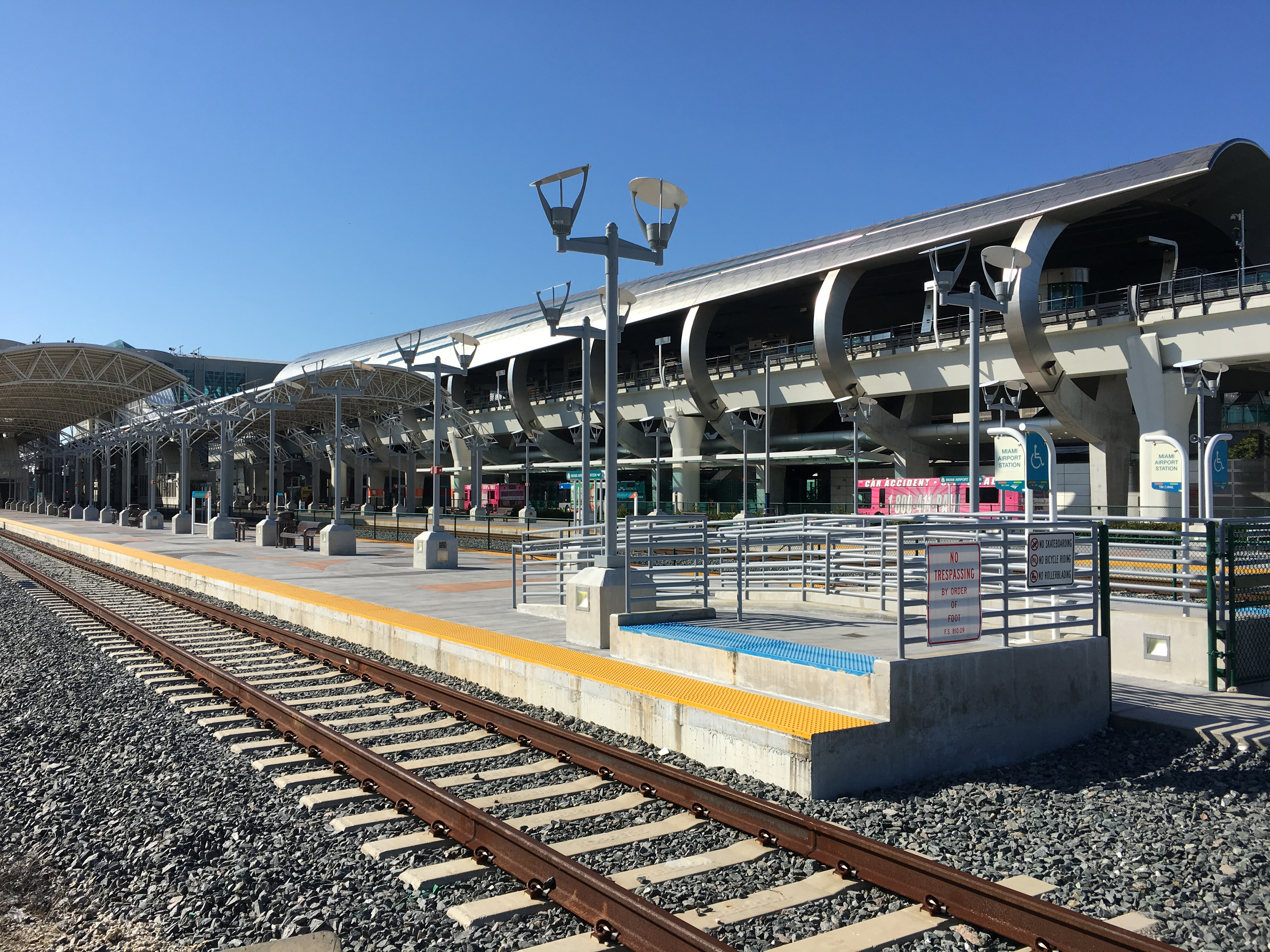
- The MIC's Tri-Rail (foreground) and Metrorail (background) platforms

General information
- Location: 3797 NW 21st Street; Miami, Florida
- Coordinates: 25°47′48″N 80°15′41″W
- Owner: Greater Miami Expressway Agency
- Lines: Spur off CSX Homestead Subdivision; Metrorail (Orange Line)
- Platforms: 2 island platforms (Tri-Rail); 1 island platform (Metrorail); 1 island platform (MIA Mover)
- Tracks: 4 (Tri-Rail); 2 (Metrorail); 2 (MIA Mover)
- Connections: Miami International Airport via MIA Mover; Flixbus; Greyhound Lines; Megabus; Metrobus: 7A, 20, 36A, 37, 42, 57, 150, 338; Miami Trolley: Flagami

Construction
- Platform levels: 2
- Parking: Yes
- Cycle facilities: Bicycle parking on ground level
- Accessible: Yes

Other information
- Fare zone: Miami–Golden Glades (Tri-Rail)

History
- Opened: RCC: July 13, 2010; MIA Mover: September 9, 2011; Metrorail: July 28, 2012; Tri-Rail: April 5, 2015

Services
Preceding station	Tri-Rail	Following station
Terminus	Main Line	Hialeah Market toward Mangonia Park
Preceding station	Miami-Dade Transit	Following station
Earlington Heights toward Dadeland South	Orange Line	Terminus
Preceding station	Miami-Dade Aviation Department	Following station
Airport terminals Terminus	MIA Mover	Terminus
Route map
Location

Miami Intermodal Center (MIC) is an intermodal rapid transit, commuter rail, local bus, and intercity bus transportation hub in Miami-Dade County, Florida, just outside the Miami city limits near the Grapeland Heights neighborhood. The facility was constructed by the Florida Department of Transportation and is owned by the Greater Miami Expressway Agency.

The MIC is located on Northwest 21st Street near North Douglas Road (West 37th Avenue), east of Le Jeune Road (West 42nd Avenue) and Miami International Airport (MIA), and south of the Miami River and the Airport Expressway (SR 112). It is currently served by Tri-Rail, Metrorail, the MIA Mover, Metrobus and Greyhound Lines. The station portion of the MIC is signed as Miami International Airport on Metrorail and Miami Airport on Tri-Rail.

The MIC's rental car center (RCC) opened on July 13, 2010. The MIA Mover began to operate at the MIC on September 9, 2011, followed by Metrorail on July 28, 2012; Tri-Rail on April 5, 2015; and Greyhound on June 24, 2015. The station was originally designed to accommodate Amtrak. However, the service was initially delayed because the platforms were constructed to insufficient length. Amtrak and the Florida Department of Transportation (FDOT) engaged in years of lease negotiations before the railroad suddenly pulled out of talks in December 2024, saying that operating its trains to the station would be too expensive.

== History ==
=== Previous stations ===
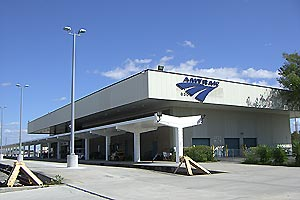
Amtrak's Miami station, constructed in 1978

When Amtrak took over intercity passenger service in May 1971, it continued to use the former Seaboard Air Line Railroad (SAL) station on NW 7th Avenue in Allapattah, two miles north of downtown. The SAL station, built in 1930, was already showing its age. On May 13, 1977, Amtrak began construction of a new station near the SAL's Hialeah Yards. It opened on June 20, 1978.

Southbound Tri-Rail service terminated at the modern-day Hialeah Market upon the line's opening on January 1, 1989. A new Miami Airport station opened in April 1998 at the present site of the Miami Intermodal Center (MIC). The Miami Airport station was the southern terminus of the Tri-Rail system between April 1998 and September 12, 2011, when service was cut back to Hialeah Market for approximately three years to facilitate construction of the new station.

Metrorail opened its first line in 1984 and 1985; due to higher-than-expected costs, other planned lines (including a line to the airport) were not immediately pursued. The Tri-Rail and Metrorail Transfer Station opened on March 6, 1989, connecting the two lines. The station is several blocks away from the 1978-built Amtrak station, with no direct connection.

=== Planning ===
In 1989, the Miami International Airport Area Transportation Study recommended the booming Miami metropolitan area invest in an intermodal hub to connect the new rapid transit and commuter rail services to local and intercity bus routes at the airport. The Intermodal Surface Transportation Efficiency Act of 1991, which gave additional powers to regional agencies and emphasized non-auto modes, prompted FDOT to proceed with the proposal.

In mid-1993, FDOT and six United States Department of Transportation (USDOT) subsidiary agencies created the Miami Intermodal Center project, with FDOT as the lead agency. The Major Investment Study/Draft Environmental Impact Statement was approved by the Federal Highway Administration in 1995. Miami-Dade County approved the project and added it to its long-term transportation plan in 1996. The Preliminary Engineering and Final Environmental Impact Statement was submitted in December 1997. A Record of Decision was received from the USDOT on May 5, 1998.

The Transportation Equity Act for the 21st Century was passed in 1998, continuing support for intermodal projects. The Transportation Infrastructure Finance and Innovation Act of 1998 allowed projects of regional or national significance to apply for federal funding. The MIC was approved for up to $433 million in such TIFIA loans in 1999, with the first $269 million granted on June 9, 2000, allowing the rental car center (RCC) component to advance. FDOT signed agreements with the South Florida Regional Transportation Authority (operator of Tri-Rail), Miami-Dade County and the Miami-Dade Expressway Authority the same year. In 2003, it was determined that the MIC would include only ground transportation services, with no airport functions being relocated. In 2002, Miami-Dade County approved a public referendum for a half-cent sales tax to support transportation expansion in the region. The tax was to fund an increase in bus service, plus two Metrorail branches: Orange Line North to 215th Street, and Orange Line West to Florida International University via the MIC. A previous attempt at a one-cent sales tax had been defeated in 1999. The second TIFIA loan, for $170 million, was signed in April 2005. The federal Safe, Accountable, Flexible, Efficient Transportation Equity Act: A Legacy for Users, passed in August 2005, continued funding for the MIC and added $100 million for the 2.4 miles (3.9 km) Metrorail branch from Earlington Heights to the MIC. In July 2006, FDOT paid $17.1 million on the first TIFIA loan, converting it to a state loan with a lower rate. In August 2007, an additional $100 million was added to the first TIFIA loan.

The Metrorail expansions funded by the 2002 sales tax were to primarily serve lower-density residential areas, causing them to have poor ridership-to-cost projections. Sales tax revenue was hurt by the late-2000s recession, and much of what was collected was instead used to cover operating expenses due to mismanagement and questionable hiring practices in the transit agency. These issues made the expansions ineligible for partial funding by the Federal Transit Administration, and they were effectively canceled in July 2010. The spur to the airport had then completed the design and was allowed to continue, although its cost doubled from original projections.

=== Construction ===
The first component of the MIC Program to be completed was significant roadway improvements. These included a new interchange with direct access from the Dolphin Expressway and the Airport Expressway to the MIC and the airport, reconfiguration of Le Jeune Road as an arterial boulevard (as it no longer was needed to handle most airport traffic), and upgrades to local roads serving the airport area. The second component was the RCC, a 3.4-million-square-foot (320,000 m^{2}) "rental car shopping mall" that provides airport passengers convenient access to participating rental car companies.

Construction of the road portion of the MIC began in 2001, followed by foundation work on the RCC in June 2003. Property and right-of-way acquisition for the project was completed in late 2003. The first column for the RCC was poured in July 2007. The main part of the Roadways Program, including the MIC-MIA Interchange and the Le Jeune Road modifications, were completed on May 16, 2008. The RCC was topped off on September 26, 2008, and opened on July 13, 2010. A shuttle bus ran from the RCC to the airport terminals.

==== Phase I: Metrorail and MIA Mover ====
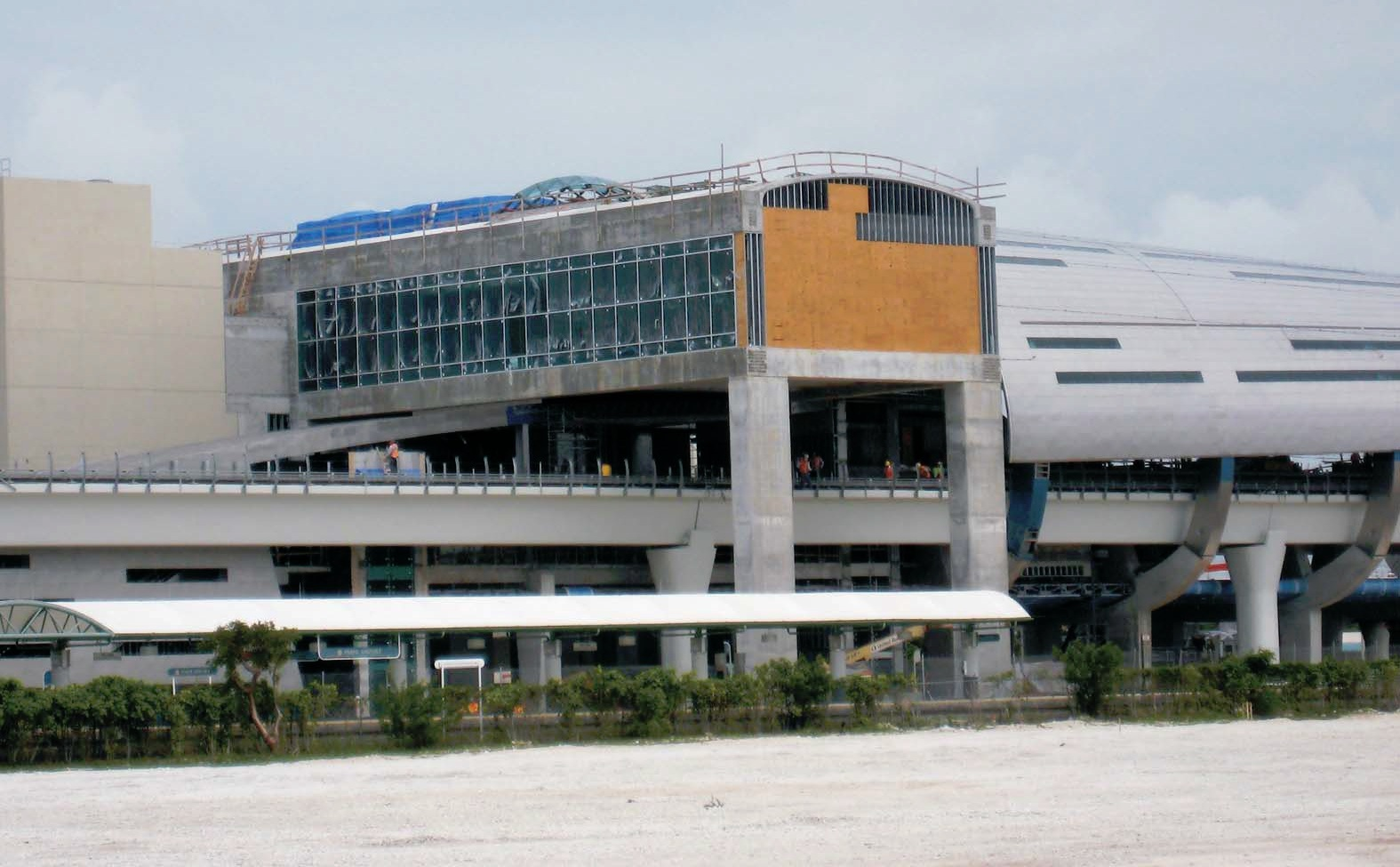
The Metrorail station under construction in June 2011. The old Tri-Rail station, not yet closed, is at the bottom left.

Phase I of the Miami Airport Station consisted of the construction of two connected terminal stations: one for the new Metrorail spur and one for the MIA Mover, a 1.25 miles (2.01 km) elevated people mover line connecting the airport terminals to the MIC. A groundbreaking for the MIA Mover was held on March 1, 2009, followed by one for the Metrorail spur on May 1. After two years of construction, the MIA Mover station received a certificate of occupancy in January 2011, allowing final systems to be installed. The MIA Mover opened on September 9, 2011, replacing the shuttle buses.

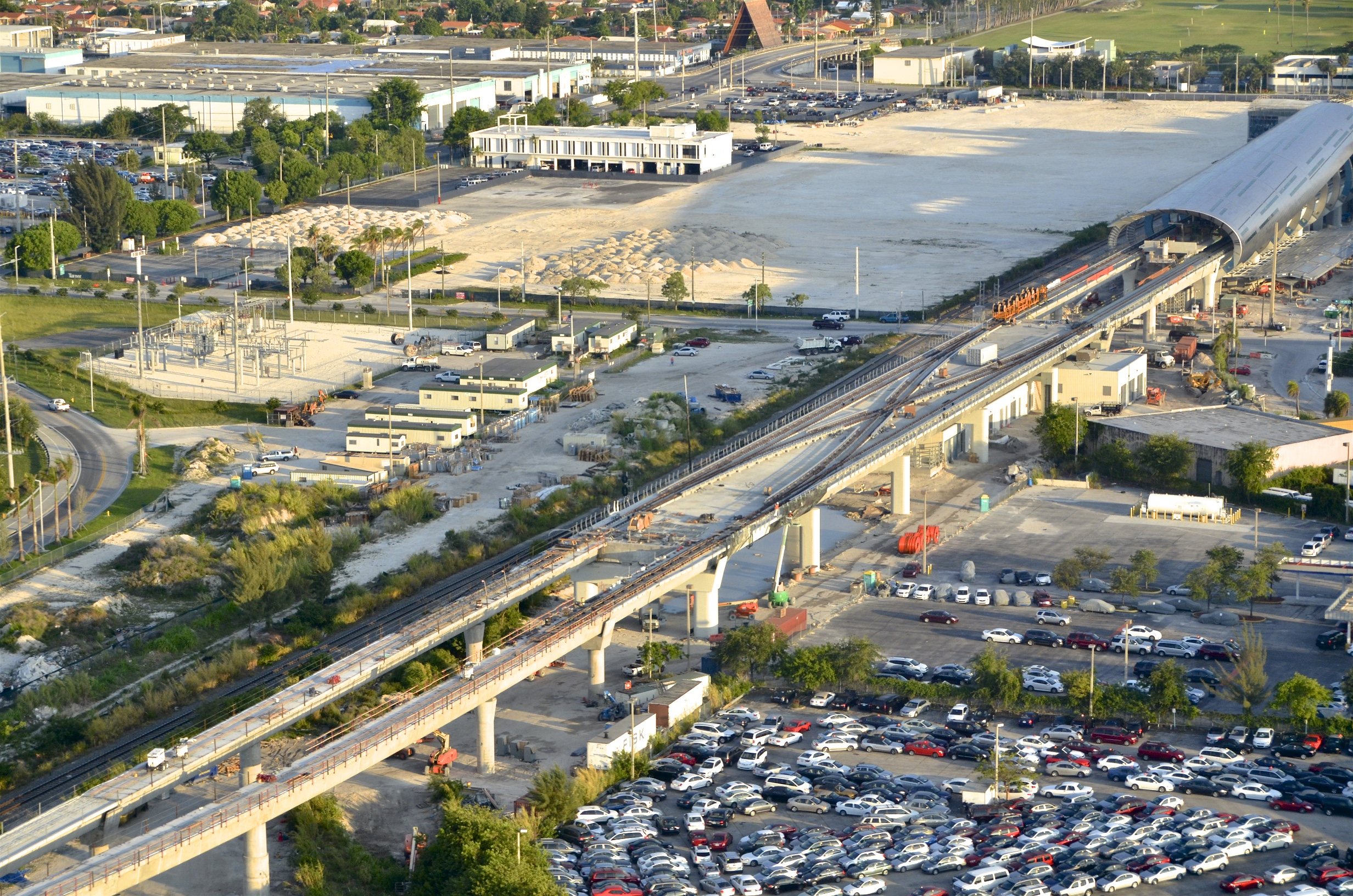
Construction of elevated railway and the Miami Airport Metrolink station, May 2011.

The Metrorail station, covered in a stainless steel and aluminum canopy, has a Metrobus station integrated into its ground level. The structure was manufactured in Kansas City, shipped in modular sections, and assembled on-site. Foundations for the Metrorail viaduct were completed in early 2010, with the beams and tracks installed over the rest of the year. By February 2011, the extension was 75% complete, with most of the station structure in place. The bridge over the Miami River was completed in March 2011. Finishes, glass walls, and canopies were installed in the station in mid-2011. Testing of Metrorail trains on the extension began in January 2012. The spur to the MIC opened as the Orange Line on July 28, 2012. The final cost of the Metrorail extension was $506 million, of which $405 million was from sales tax and $101 million from FDOT.

In the first few years, Metrorail ridership was lower than expected, starting below 1,500 daily and increasing to nearly 2,000 daily by 2015–2016, though notably, ridership was almost equally high on weekends, where most stations have about half the ridership on weekends.

==== Phase II: Mainline rail and intercity bus ====
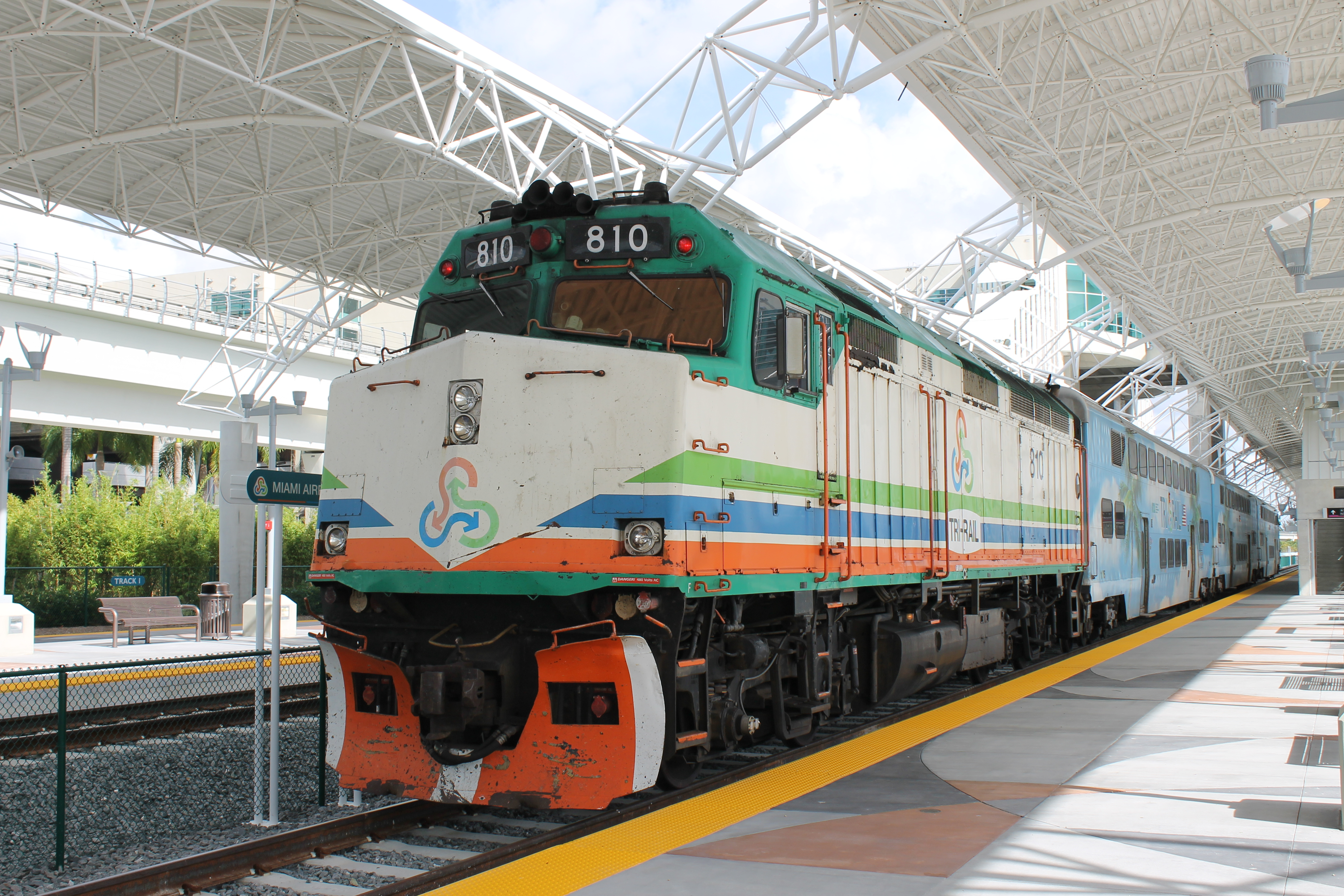
A Tri-Rail train at the MIC in April 2015

Phase II of Miami Airport Station comprised mainline rail and intercity bus facilities connected to the Phase I complex by a pedestrian bridge. The station includes two stub-end island platforms served by four tracks. Construction began on May 18, 2011. Tri-Rail service at the old airport station was suspended on September 12, 2011, for a planned two-year construction period. During the closure, Hialeah Market station received temporary shuttle service to the airport. The closure was expected to reduce construction costs by $10 million. A ceremonial groundbreaking took place on September 27, 2011.

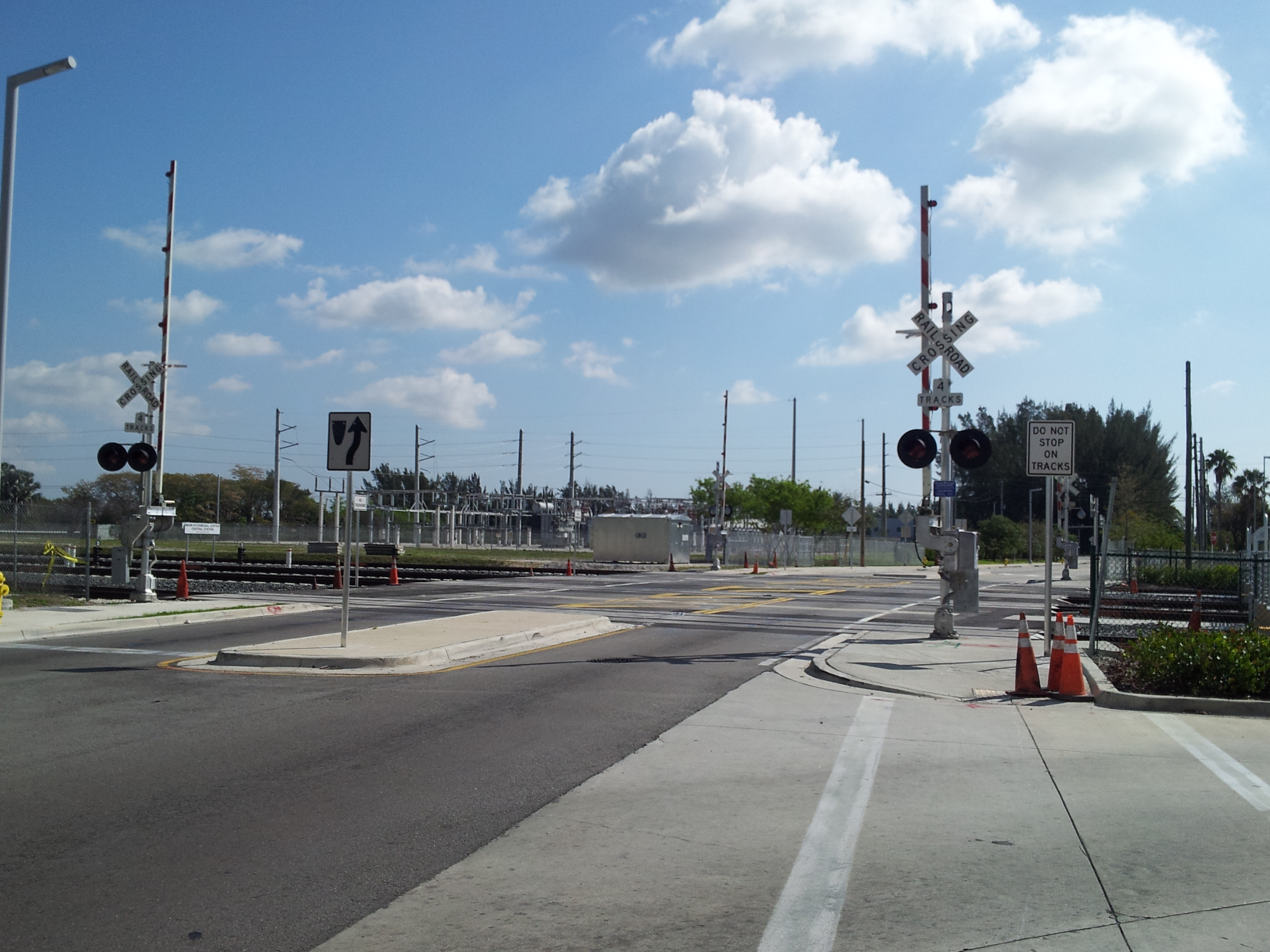
NW 25th Street at the north end of the station

During construction, Amtrak identified platform length constraints. The planned 1,030-foot-long (310 m) platforms could accommodate standard nine- and ten-car trains used by the Silver Star (now temporarily replaced by the Floridian) and the Silver Meteor. However, Amtrak operates longer trains in the winter, which require 1,220-foot-long (370 m) platforms. NW 25th Street lies immediately north of the platforms, limiting extension options. In early 2013, FDOT considered closing the crossing, constructing a bridge, or building a tunnel, and platform extensions were already underway. Closing the crossing was later rejected following local opposition. Other options were estimated to cost $6 to 55 million and delay opening by about one year. FDOT subsequently demolished partially constructed platform extensions at a cost of $380,000. In October 2013, FDOT adopted a $9 million traffic mitigation plan. NW 25th Street would remain open, but could be blocked during extended station stops by longer trains. Another grade crossing with connecting roads was built at NW 28th Street, with signs installed to automatically redirect motorists when the crossing was expected to be blocked for an extended period.

By early 2015, the project was more than a year behind schedule. Outstanding issues included platform limitations, contractor cost disputes, and disagreements over facility ownership. Tri-Rail service resumed on April 5, 2015. Greyhound began service on June 24, 2015.

Amtrak had planned to relocate from Miami station by Fall 2016. In 2018, Amtrak declined proposed lease terms and stated that it had no plans to move to the facility. Negotiations resumed in 2021. A test train operated in March 2022. In late 2022, Amtrak indicated preparations for relocation were nearing completion, subject to operational constraints including deadheading moves and additional track work. In December 2024, Amtrak notified officials that it would not relocate to the Miami Intermodal Center, citing projected operating costs. Financial data released in February 2025 projected 20,000 additional annual passengers and $2 million in revenue, alongside $5 million in added operating costs. Required renovations were estimated at $6.4 million for the intermodal center and $21.8 million for the existing station to meet accessibility standards.

== Station layout ==
Miami Airport is a terminal station for all three services. The MIA Mover automated people mover system transports passengers between the station and airport terminals, departs from the upper level of the station in the southern direction. Metrorail, which provides service Downtown Miami and points south, departs from the upper level in the northern direction. On the ground level, four tracks serve Tri-Rail and possible future Amtrak service towards Fort Lauderdale, West Palm Beach, and points north. The ground level also has bus bays and a waiting area for Metrobus, Greyhound, and Megabus. The concourse and headhouse were built to accommodate a future third Tri-Rail and Amtrak platform to the east of the existing platforms.

A 1,450-foot (440 m) footbridge over the Tamiami Canal is planned to connect the station with Miami Freedom Park. As of July 2026, construction is expected to begin in 2027 and be completed in mid-2029.

=== Rental car center ===
The MIC contains a multi-level consolidated rental car facility with 16 rental car companies. Opened on July 13, 2010, the RCC is home to 6,500 rental cars and is projected to serve 28,000 customers daily. The Quick Turnaround Area, where vehicles are washed and refueled, includes 120 gas pump positions and 42 car wash bays on three vehicle storage levels. The multi-level fueling system is the first in the United States.

The consolidation initially cut the combined rental car bus fleet in half from 120 buses to 60. In September 2011, the MIA Mover entirely replaced the shuttle bus service. The elimination of the rental car bus fleet has reduced gas emissions at the airport by 30%.

== See also ==
- Orlando International Airport Intermodal Terminal
- Transportation in South Florida
