= Miracle Mile (Coral Gables) =

Shopping area in Coral Gables, Florida

Coordinates: 25.749594°N 80.258625°W

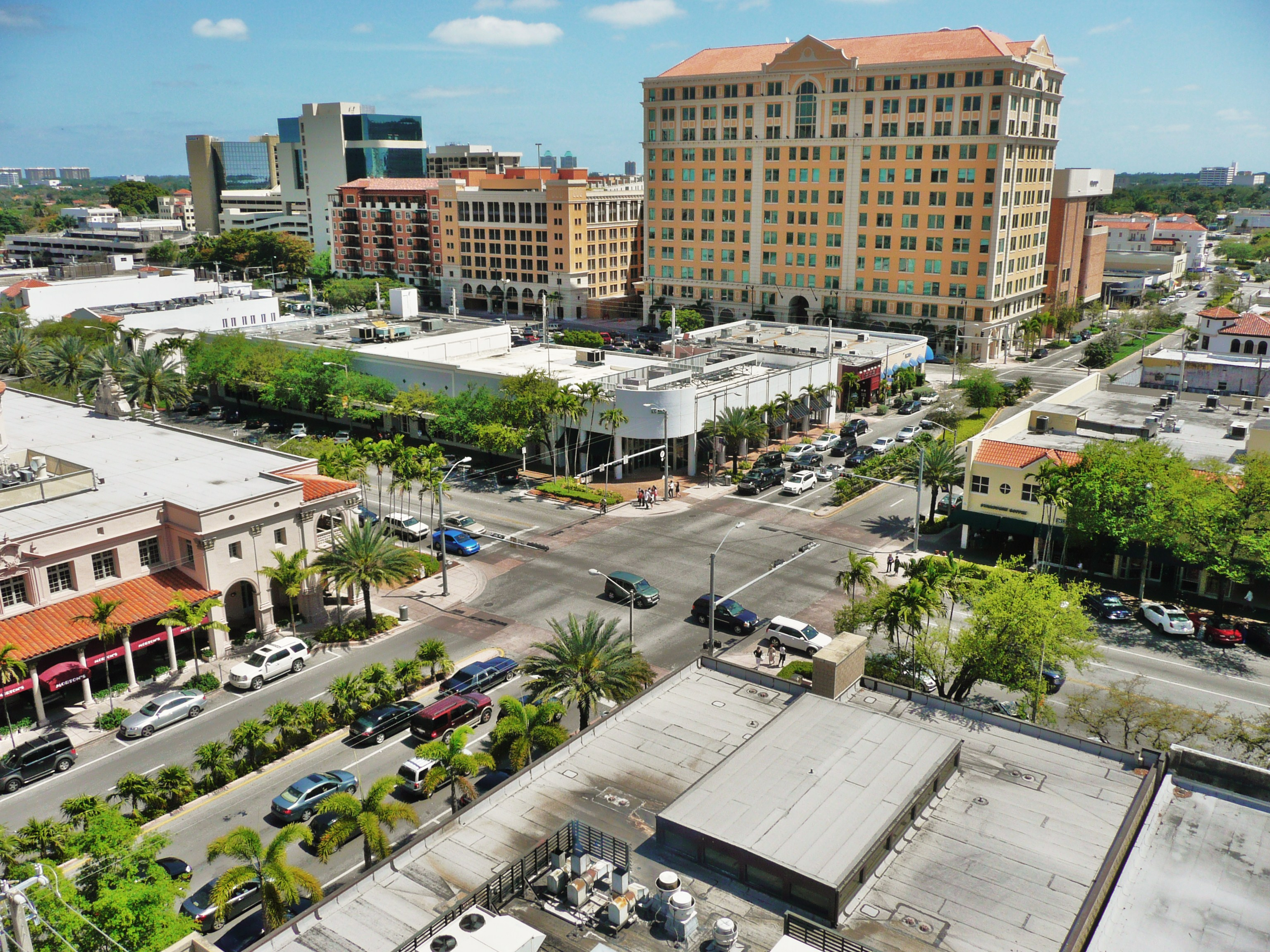
- Miracle Mile in Coral Gables, Florida, April 2010
- Interactive map of Miracle Mile
- Length: 0.503 mi (0.810 km)
- West end: SR 953 (LeJeune Road) in Coral Gables
- East end: Douglas Road in Miami / Coral Gables

Construction
- Inauguration: 1922

Miracle Mile is a 0.503-mile-long (0.810 km) section of Coral Way between LeJeune Road (SW 42nd Avenue) and Douglas Road (SW 37th Avenue) in Coral Gables, Florida. It is the main east-west road through the city's downtown central business district, consisting of many shops, financial institutions, restaurants and arts institution. The LeJeune Road end of Miracle Mile is anchored by the Coral Gables City Hall.

Miracle Mile and the surrounding Downtown Coral Gables area is served indirectly by the Miami Metrorail by transferring from the Douglas Road station to the Coral Gables Trolley at the station. The trolley runs up and down Ponce de Leon Boulevard from Miracle Mile to the Metro.

The boulevard is lined with restaurants, shops, boutiques, art galleries, and today "Downtown Coral Gables, including Miracle Mile, is one of South Florida's most sought-after shopping destinations."

== History ==
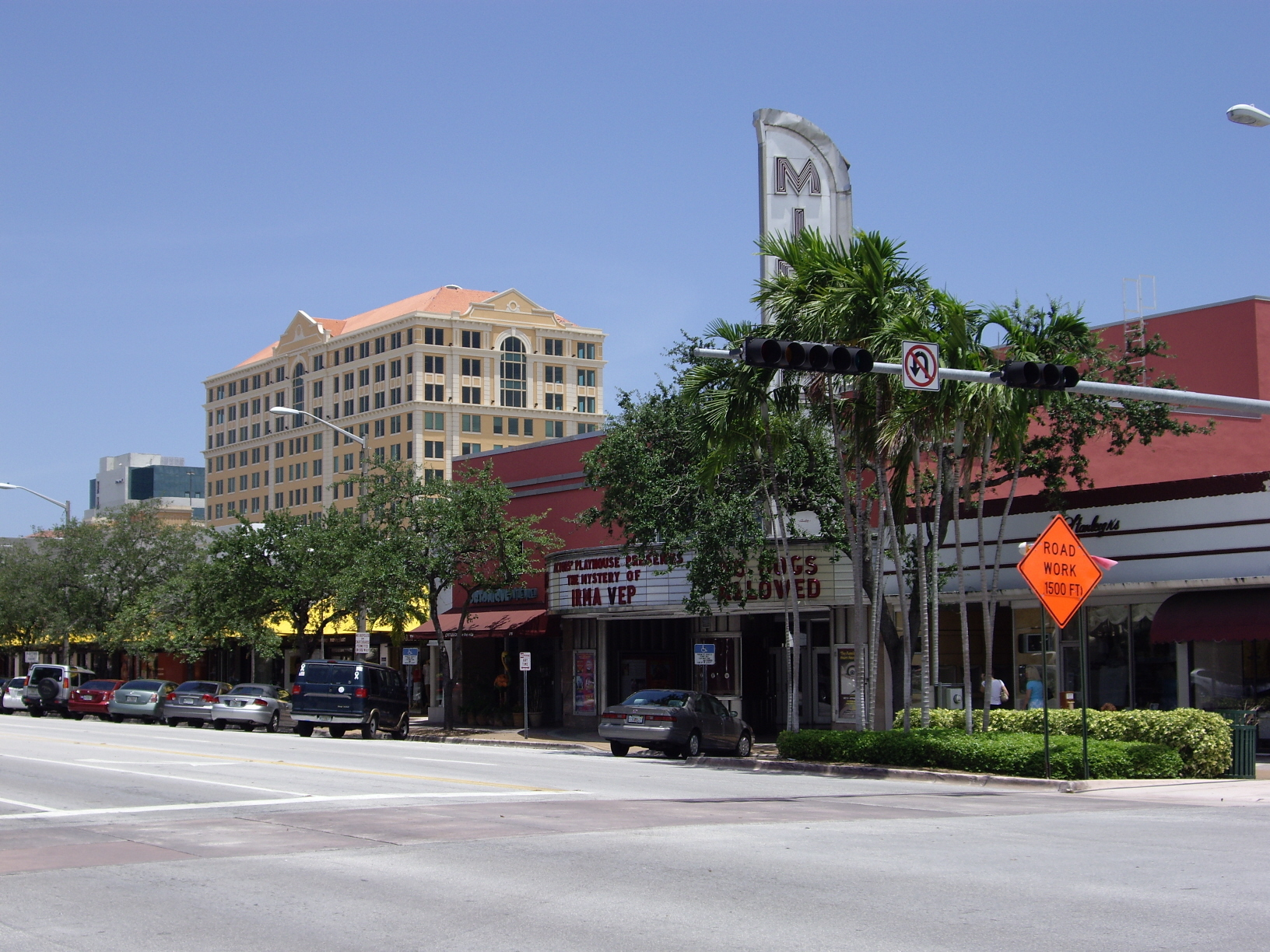
Miracle Theater on Miracle Mile in Coral Gables July 2006

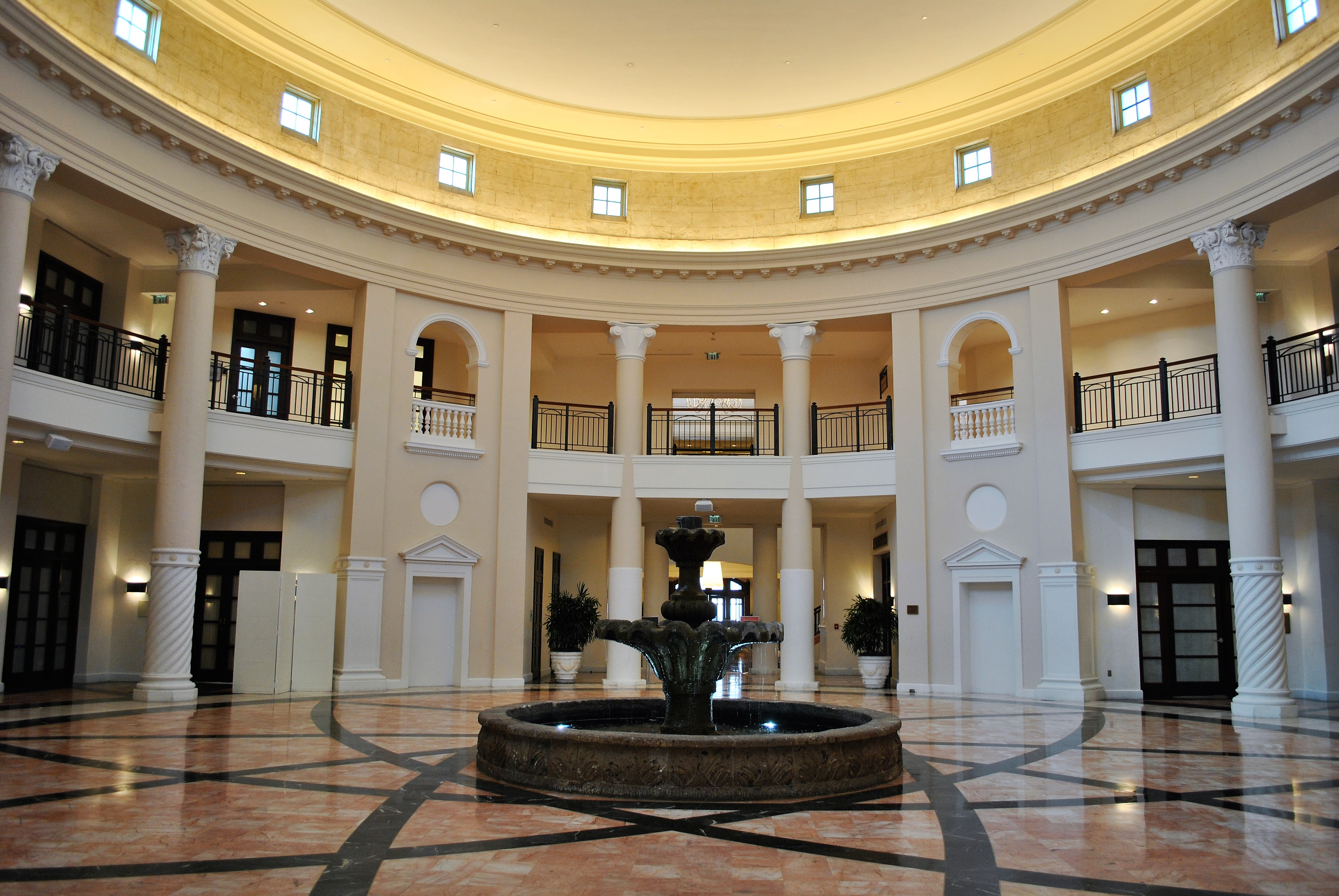
Colonnade Building in Coral Gables, March 2017

Like all of Coral Gables' commercial district, Miracle Mile was designed by George Merrick. Upon its construction, every business in Coral Gables was less than a two-block walk from Miracle Mile.

The Colonnade Building at 133-169 Miracle Mile was designed in 1926 by Phineas Paist in collaboration with Walter De Garmo and Paul Chalfin in a mixture of Spanish Colonial and Baroque. The main purpose, in Merrick's planning, was to house his growing sales operation. Since the 1920s, the Colonnade has had many tenants including the Colonnade Movie Studios and a World War II parachute factory. Today it houses a hotel and office building designed by Spillis & Candela.

The downtown commercial district was once serviced by a free trolley that ran down Ponce de Leon Boulevard, the main artery bisecting the business district. The old trolley system was ended as a result of the growing usage of automobiles until a new free "trolley system" (buses with a "retro" trolly-like livery) was initiated in November 2003.

After declines during the Great Depression and World War II, developers and business took to rebranding the area to turn it into a "high-end shopping destination." Through this vision and investment effort, the area was named Miracle Mile in 1955.

George K. Zain and his wife Rebyl Zain contributed their leadership, enthusiasm and faith to the conception of the high-end shopping boulevard. Zain created a plan to resolve the solution to parking and built parking garages in the area. In 1960, George Zain was nicknamed "Father of Miracle Mile."

In Spring 2016, Miracle Mile and Giralda Avenue began undergoing a street-scape design update. New York-based architecture firm Cooper Robertson has undertaken this $21 million re-design project. The new concept includes wider sidewalks, curb-less street edge lined with low stones and greenery, and a change in the parking structure.

== See also ==
- Miracle Marketplace
