= Florida State Road 836 =

Highway in Florida

State Road 836
- State Road 836 highlighted in green, I-395 highlighted in red

Route information
- Maintained by GMX and FDOT
- Length: 15.387 mi (24.763 km)
- Existed: 1969–present

Major junctions
- West end: SR 825 in Tamiami
- Florida's Turnpike Extension near Tamiami; SR 826 in Fontainebleau; I-95 in Miami
- East end: US 1 / SR A1A in Miami

Location
- Country: United States
- State: Florida
- Counties: Miami-Dade

Highway system
- Florida State Highway System; Interstate; US; State; Former; Pre‑1945; Toll; Scenic
← SR 834	→ SR 838
← SR 393	I-395	→ SR 397

State Road 836 (SR 836) is a 15.3-mile-long (24.6 km) east–west state highway connecting Tamiami to Miami, as well as Miami Beach via the MacArthur Causeway in the U.S. state of Florida. Between Tamiami and Interstate 95, it is a controlled-access toll road locally known as the Dolphin Expressway. Between I-95 and its eastern terminus at Biscayne Boulevard (US 1), SR 836 is signed only as Interstate 395 as it crosses Greater Downtown Miami and leads into the MacArthur Causeway.

The road currently extends from just north of the intersection of Southwest 137th Avenue and US 41 in Tamiami, eastward through Miami past the Homestead Extension of Florida's Turnpike (HEFT, SR 821), the Palmetto Expressway (SR 826), Miami International Airport, and I-95, before ending at Biscayne Boulevard (US 1) in Miami, becoming SR A1A at the west end of the MacArthur Causeway. The Dolphin Expressway is maintained and operated by the Greater Miami Expressway Agency (GMX), while the I-395 section is maintained by the Florida Department of Transportation (FDOT). The Dolphin Expressway from the Palmetto Expressway to I-95 opened in 1969, with the I-395 section opening in 1971, the extension to the HEFT opening in 1974, and a second western extension opening in 2007.

== Route description ==
=== Dolphin Expressway ===
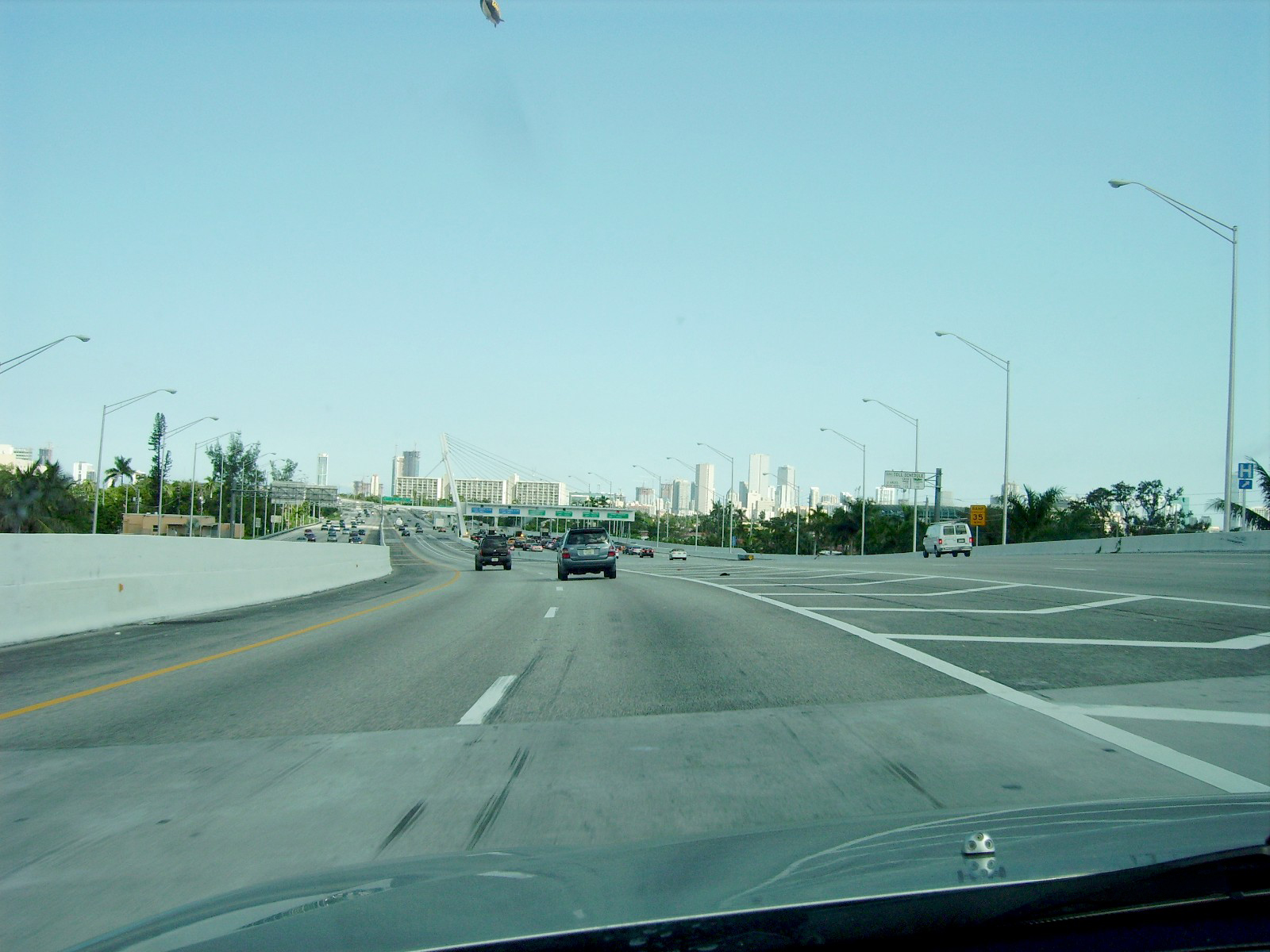
Dolphin Expressway (SR 836) eastbound with Downtown Miami in the background

SR 836 begins in the west as the tolled 14.204-mile-long (22.859 km) Dolphin Expressway, most of which is maintained by the Greater Miami Expressway Agency (GMX). The expressway begins just north of the intersection of Southwest 137th Avenue (unsigned SR 825) and U.S. Highway 41 (SR 90) in Tamiami, built in 2007 and initially accessible only to motorists with SunPass transponders, passing through the first toll gantry. The expressway heads east towards the Homestead Extension of the Turnpike, and then passes through the second of four toll gantries. It then intersects with the Palmetto Expressway (SR 826) at the recently rebuilt Dolphin–Palmetto Interchange, and passes through the southern end of the Miami International Airport. With the failure of FDOT to build either the previously planned airport spur or the proposed LeJeune Road Expressway to give additional access to the airport, Miami-Dade County's sole complete east–west throughway is now often congested, most commonly in the stretch between the Palmetto Expressway (SR 826) and LeJeune Road (SR 953).

During this stretch, the expressway has interchanges with NW 72nd Avenue, a third toll gantry, NW 57th Avenue, and a partial with NW 45th Avenue before reaching LeJeune Road. East of the interchange with the airport at LeJeune Road, The expressway has interchanges with NW 37th Avenue and NW 27th Avenue (SR 9), and then reaches the fourth and final toll gantry just west of downtown. The expressway has two more interchanges in the fringes of downtown with NW 17th Avenue and NW 12th Avenue before terminating at I-95 at the Midtown Interchange.

=== Interstate 395 ===
Interstate 395
- Location: Miami
- Length: 1.29 mi (2.08 km)
- Existed: 1964–present

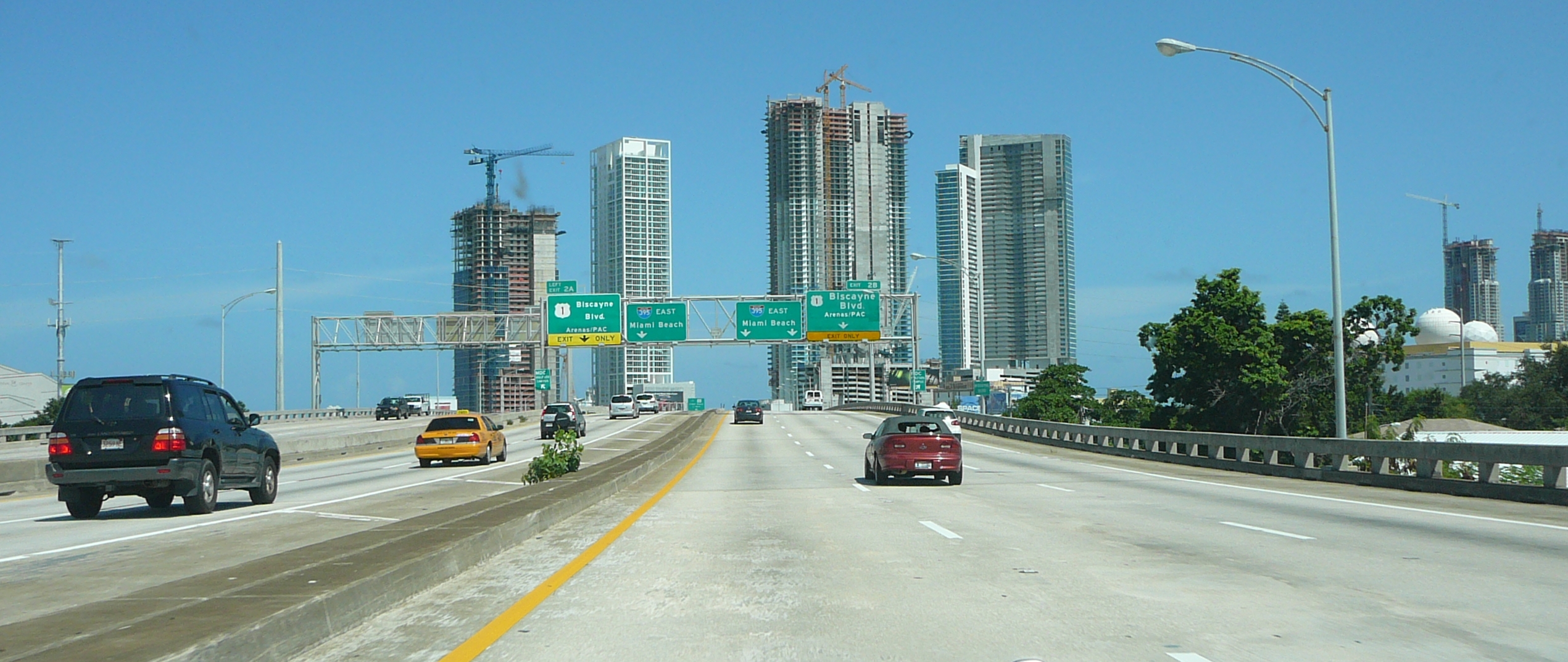
I-395 spur heading east past Downtown Miami

The 1.183-mile-long (1.904 km) section of SR 836 connecting I-95 in the west with the MacArthur Causeway (SR A1A) in the east is also designated and signed as Interstate 395 (I-395), with SR 836 becoming an unsigned highway.

I-395 begins at the Midtown Interchange, continuing east from the Dolphin Expressway as a non-tolled, elevated, six-lane expressway into downtown Miami. The feeder lanes from I-95 to eastbound I-395 make up a separate three lane ramp to the right of I-395, with the exit to US 1/US 41 being a left exit from the I-395 lanes and a right exit from the I-95 feeder lanes. The feeder lanes then merge into three lanes, heading east towards the MacArthur Causeway, with I-395 and SR 836 terminating just east of an entrance ramp with US 1 (SR 5)/US 41, and continuing as SR A1A.

== Tolls ==
The Dolphin Expressway is an all-electronic toll road that only accepts tolls via SunPass transponders or billing by the toll-by-plate at double cost. The toll road does not accept cash. Toll gantries are located along the expressway and on interchange ramps, eliminating all "free movement" sections that existed in the past. As of November 15, 2014, the total toll for traffic traveling along the expressway from Northwest 137th Avenue to Interstate 95 is $2.40 for SunPass users, and $4.80 for Toll-by-Plate users.

== History ==
The old shield for the Dolphin Expressway used from its opening to the mid-2000s

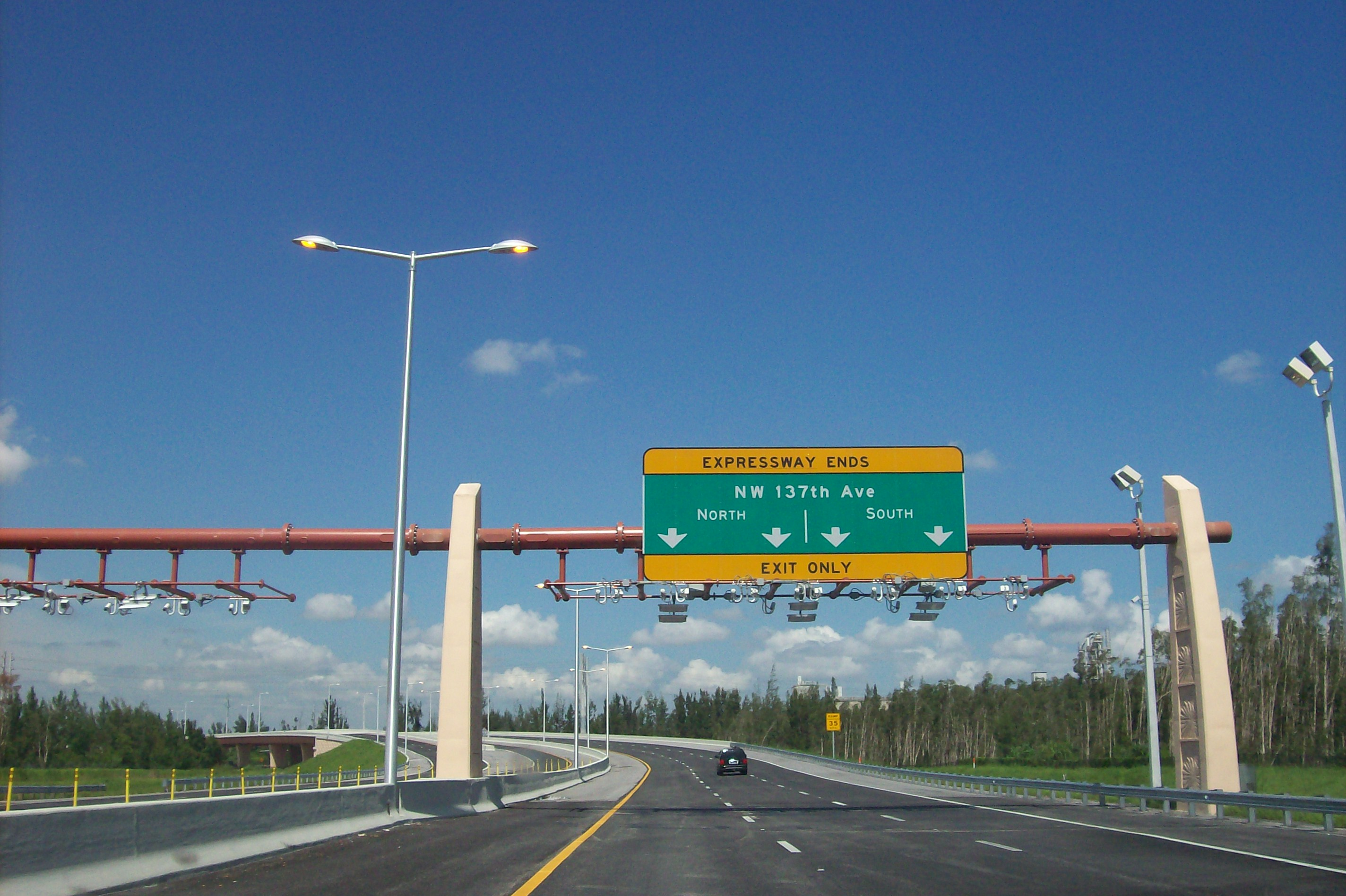
Signage denoting the current western terminus of the Dolphin Expressway, right above an all electronic toll gantry

Originally envisioned as the Twentieth Street Tollway in 1964 (with a spur to the airport along LeJeune Road), construction on the Fourteenth Street east–west Expressway between the Palmetto Expressway and US 1 started in 1967 and was completed in 1969. Two years later, construction of the western extension to Florida's Turnpike commenced, and was finished in 1974. Also in 1974, the name of the tollway was changed to commemorate the success of the Miami Dolphins of the NFL, after back-to-back wins in the Super Bowl.

The segment of SR 836 signed as I-395 was supposed to open with the Dolphin Expressway in 1968, but was delayed due to a freeze at the federal level for road spending. The I-395 segment opened on March 26, 1971.

Initial plans for the Interstate 75 extension to Miami in 1968 would have used the Dolphin Expressway as its final link to Interstate 95 (I-75 would have crossed the Everglades via Tamiami Trail under this plan). However, these plans were abandoned in 1973 in favor of I-75's current route farther north. The fact that the Dolphin Expressway was not built to Interstate Highway standards and the expensive costs in upgrading it to such was one of the factors in changing I-75's proposed route.

Construction of a second westward extension of SR 836 started in 2004. This extension, westward to Northwest 137th Avenue near Northwest 12th Street, opened June 22, 2007, was initially accessible only to motorists with SunPass electronic toll-paying capability; there is no capacity for the collection of cash. The road has since opened to non SunPass users with the Toll by Plate system.

Until July 1, 2007, the toll for eastbound automobiles was $1.25 ($1.00 for motorists with SunPass), paid at a toll booth between Northwest 22nd and Northwest 17th Avenues (toll is not collected from westbound traffic). In conjunction with the completion of the new three-mile-long extension west of the Turnpike, tolls of $1.00 (75 cents for motorists with SunPass) were collected from traffic in both directions west of SR 973 (Northwest 87th Avenue/Galloway Road). Although the new toll was originally stated to be only for the extension, motorists going to the Florida Turnpike or Northwest 107th Avenue also have to pay.

On July 21, 2013, the eastbound toll plaza near I-95 ceased cash collection and became all electronic, with those paying with SunPass paying $1, and Toll by Plate users paying $2.

On November 15, 2014, the Dolphin Expressway became an all electronic toll road, no longer collecting cash, and the only ways to pay are either by the SunPass transponders or billing by the toll-by-plate program, at double the cost of SunPass users. Toll gantries are located along the expressway and on interchanges to where there are no "free movement" sections of the expressway as existed previously. The move was first announced in 2010, and along with the nearby Airport Expressway, was the last of the GMX expressways to be converted to open road tolling.

On May 24, 2010, construction began on the Port Miami Tunnel, a $1 billion project that connects the port to other major highway arteries, including I-395, with the tunnel opening on August 3, 2014.

=== Recent history ===
In 2016, the construction of additional lanes to match the rebuilt, higher capacity Dolphin–Palmetto Interchange, with SR 826 was completed.

Following a widening project in the late 2010s, bus lanes were added along the shoulder of the Dolphin Expressway. The expressway is home to two of the state's diverging-diamond interchanges after the reconstruction of two exits at Northwest 27th Avenue and Northwest 57th Avenue.

In May 2022, construction began on four new ramps that connect to the HEFT. It includes:

- From the Miami-Dade Transit Dolphin station Park-n-Ride, a new ramp to westbound SR 836.
- From eastbound SR 836, a new ramp to the Dolphin station Park-n-Ride and to northbound HEFT.
- From southbound HEFT, a new ramp to westbound SR 836.

In addition, improvements are being made to ramps from southbound HEFT to eastbound SR 836 and westbound SR 836 to northbound HEFT. The project is expected to cost $41.1 million and was supposed to be completed in spring 2024. The new ramps opened on October 23rd, 2024

=== Future ===
==== Connecting Miami ====
In January 2019, the construction of a new SR 836/I-95/I-395 interchange project began. The GMX is overseeing the construction of a new double-decker span of the SR 836 (from NW 17 Avenue, rising over the center of the existing SR 836 roadway, and touching down at I-395, east of the I-95 interchange), while the Florida Department of Transportation (FDOT) is overseeing the construction of the complete replacement of the I-395 sector (from I-95 to the MacArthur Causeway), with a new "signature" cable-stayed bridge extending across it and over Biscayne Boulevard. Community parks, art installations, and urban green spaces will be designed underneath the 1.4-mile stretch, from NW 3 Avenue to Biscayne Boulevard. In addition, I-95 will undergo concrete pavement reconstruction from NW 8 Street to NW 29 Street.

The project is known as "Connecting Miami". The entire project is expected to cost $840 million and be completed in late 2027.

==== Proposed four-mile extension ====
The Kendall Parkway was a proposed 14-mile north–south extension of SR 836, originally planned to serve as a multimodal transportation corridor sitting mostly west of SW 167th Avenue and east of SW 177th Avenue (SR 997), the latter having recently been widened from a rural two-lane roadway to a four-lane divided highway between 2015 and 2021. The proposed route was to run from the current termini of SR 836 at NW 137th Avenue, to SW 136th Street near Miami Executive Airport. Nearly fifty percent of the required land was secured for the project.

The original 14-mile extension was cancelled on June 11, 2026, due to the costs having increased to $3 billion. Voters opted for a shorter four-mile extension that would end near the intersection of SW 8th Street (US 41/Tamiami Trail) and SW 157th Avenue, with an expected project cost of $1.5 billion.

== Exit list ==
Exits are unnumbered on the GMX-maintained section.The entire route is in Miami-Dade County.

Location	mi	km	Exit	Destinations	Notes
Tamiami	0.000	0.000	—	SR 825 south (Southwest 137th Avenue / Lindgren Road) to US 41	The Tamiami Trail is approximately one mile south from the end of the expressway via SR 825. Northbound 137th Avenue leads into an industrial park, where it ends at Northwest 25th Street.
Tamiami	0.8	1.3	Tamiami toll gantry		
Tamiami	1.71	2.75	—	Northwest 121st Avenue / Telemundo Way	Opened October 23rd, 2024; eastbound exit and westbound entrance; access to Miami-Dade Transit Dolphin Park-and-Ride
Tamiami–Fontainebleau– Sweetwater tripoint	2.21	3.56	—	Florida's Turnpike Extension – Homestead, Fort Lauderdale, Orlando	No southbound access from eastbound SR 836; exit 26 on Florida's Turnpike Extension
Fontainebleau–Doral line	3.584	5.768	—	SR 985 (Northwest 107th Avenue)	Eastbound exit is only accessible from Turnpike entrance; tolled eastbound exit and westbound entrance
Fontainebleau–Doral line	4.4	7.1	Fontainebleau toll gantry		
Fontainebleau–Doral line	5.12	8.24	—	SR 973 (Northwest 87th Avenue / Galloway Road) / Northwest 12th Street	Tolled eastbound entrance and westbound exit
Fontainebleau–Doral line	5.45	8.77	—	SR 826 (Palmetto Expressway)	
Fontainebleau–Doral line	6.48	10.43	—	SR 968 (West Flagler Street) / US 41 (Southwest 8th Street / Tamiami Trail)	Via SR 826 south; westbound exit is via SR 836 east
Fontainebleau–Doral line	6.73	10.83	—	SR 969 (Northwest 72nd Avenue / Milam Dairy Road)	Tolled westbound entrance
Miami	8.5	13.7	Red Road toll gantry		
Miami	8.689	13.984	—	SR 959 (Northwest 57th Avenue / Red Road)	Diverging diamond interchange; tolled westbound exit and eastbound entrance
Miami	9.89	15.92	—	Northwest 45th Avenue	Eastbound exit and westbound entrance
Miami	10.275	16.536	—	SR 953 (Le Jeune Road / Northwest 42nd Avenue) – Coral Gables, Rental Car Center, Airport	Westbound exit is via Northwest 14th Street
Miami	10.795	17.373	—	Northwest 37th Avenue / Douglas Road	Westbound exit and eastbound entrance
Miami	11.834	19.045	—	SR 9 (Northwest 27th Avenue)	Diverging diamond interchange; tolled eastbound exit and westbound entrance
Miami	12.538	20.178	Ballpark toll gantry		
Miami	12.915	20.785	—	Northwest 17th Avenue – Civic Center, Ballpark	Eastbound exit and westbound entrance; access to University of Miami Medical Center and Jackson Memorial Hospital
Miami	13.447	21.641	—	SR 933 (Northwest 12th Avenue) – Medical / Civic Center	Westbound exit and eastbound entrance (both tolled)
Miami	13.999	22.529	East end of GMX maintenance; west end of state maintenance		
Miami	14.204	22.859	1	I-95 / Northwest 8th Street – Fort Lauderdale, Downtown, Key Biscayne I-395 begins	Western terminus of I-395; signed as exits 1A (south) and 1B (north) westbound; exits 2D (east) and 3A (west) on I-95
Miami	15.156	24.391	2	US 1 (Biscayne Boulevard) – Arenas, PAC, Bayside, Science Museum	Signed as exit 2A eastbound (exit 2B is for traffic coming from I-95)
Miami	15.387	24.763	—	SR A1A north to SR 887 (PortMiami via Tunnel) – Miami Beach, Jungle Island, Miami Children's Museum, Miami Seaplane Base	Continues east as SR A1A via MacArthur Causeway
1.000 mi = 1.609 km; 1.000 km = 0.621 mi: Concurrency terminus; Electronic toll collection; Incomplete access
