= Perry Milou =

American contemporary pop artist (born 1967)

- Born: October 4, 1967 (age 58); Philadelphia, Pennsylvania
- Education: University of Arizona Tucson, Arizona
- Known for: Art, Painting, Pop art
- Movement: Pop art, Contemporary art

Perry Milou (born October 4, 1967) is an American contemporary pop artist known for his representational works of popular culture subjects including iconic celebrities, notable sports players, political figures and landmarks. Collectors and critics have noted his bold and rich palettes throughout his career. His list of commission patrons and collectors includes names such as Sylvester Stallone, Julius Erving, the Philadelphia Museum of Art, the Philadelphia Eagles and Ed Rendell. He lives and works in Philadelphia, Pennsylvania.

Vangoghing to Philly by Perry Milou

== Work ==
Milou first gained recognition in Philadelphia, with paintings of local sports heroes and landmarks which he created outdoors in a high traffic area of the city where people could see him and his work. Milou takes an original approach while drawing influence from masters – pop stylings of Peter Max and Andy Warhol, skills of Edgar Degas and brushstrokes of Vincent van Gogh. He's described his art as a "fine-pop” and “in your face with vibrant colors”, and said “my art peters between commercial and fine art.” Others have coined his style as “pop-impressionist“. In the late 2000s he developed a technique which he called “rain,” dripping oil paint vertically down the canvas, creating the sensation of looking through a rain streaked window. An example of this technique is The Dreary Dean, which depicts the tragic moodiness of James Dean in portrait. Other works combined Swarovski crystals with this painting technique, like his Vegas Icons Playing Cards series. His portfolio's long list of recognizable figures includes names such as Liz Taylor, Marilyn Monroe, Frida Kahlo, Geronimo, characters from television's The Sopranos, Frank Sinatra, George W. Bush, Rocky Balboa, the Dalai Lama, Nelson Mandela, Sophia Loren, Jackie Kennedy, Robin Williams, Madonna, Barbra Streisand, Sylvester Stallone, Elvis Presley, Lady Gaga, Chazz Palminteri, Cole Hamels, Bruce Springsteen, and Albert Einstein. In 2007 his Marilyn Monroe series was featured in the Marylin in Art book published by Cantor Publishing Group. In January 2017, Milou presented Joe Biden his portrait of the former US Vice President upon his return home to Delaware after the inauguration. “I am constantly looking at the sky; it is the closest thing to watching God paint in the present moment.”

=== Vegas Icons Playing Cards Series ===
In the 2000s, Milou created a series of 16 “playing cards”, multi-media oil paintings embellished with Swarovski Crystals and decoupage. Each painting featured a pop icon which he paired with a suited insignia and corresponding quote, using different painting techniques to represent the characteristics of each character. This series includes Bono as the two of clubs, Elvis Presley the king of spades, and Marilyn Monroe queen of diamonds.

=== Lover Lips Series ===
Continuing to work in series, Milou developed a collection of large scale oil paintings in his "rain" style thematically centered on lips. This series includes subjects from classic actresses such as Sophia Loren and Brigitte Bardot to modern one's like Angelina Jolie and Jessica Alba.

=== Pucker Up Project ===
In 2008, after moving to Miami, Milou was one of many artists to open his gallery doors for Art Basel. During this time he created The Pucker Up Project, a series of three 8x8ft paintings. Each canvas included 1,024 painted square sections that combined created the image on each canvas, an effect like pointillism Anticipating large crowds, he linked this interactive project to charity and charged $100 to kiss a square. Proceeds went to benefit the Sylvester Comprehensive Cancer Center.

A Prayer for Peace by Milou

=== A Prayer for Peace ===
In 2015 Milou's painting A Prayer For Peace became the official licensed portrait by The World Meeting of Families for the Papal visit to Philadelphia. Inspired by Pope Francis, Milou created a series of paintings he coined The Faces of Francis. The first licensed painting A Prayer for Peace portrayed Francis in profile blowing a kiss with the earth as the background, painted in Milou's “rain” technique. The second Holy Day depicts Francis outside the Philadelphia Museum of Art. A Prayer for Peace is priced at $1,000,000 with a majority of the proceeds designated to charity. The organization negotiated a percentage-based licensing deal with Milou, which led to a line of official merchandise - posters, mugs, paperweights, tote bags – developed through retailer Aramark. This deal led to more partnerships for the event, including 15 more Pope centered products and prints of the paintings with text like “Irish Blessings”, “Amore” and "Feliz Natal". Milou believes this honor came from a higher power and divine intervention made everything fall into place, sharing “divine coincidences” about his life - being born on October 4, St. Francis Day, his grandfather's name Francis DeFrancesco, mother Angel, wife Angela, father in law Angelo, nanny Angelica, daughter Francesca and his son due to be born the week Pope Francis arrived in Philadelphia.

=== Sports icons ===
Milou began including sports players in paintings in the early 2000s, especially when a local team was on a championship run. An early example being The Franchise created in 2001, a 7x4.5 ft oil painting featuring 76ers Allen Iverson, Wilt Chamberlain, Charles Barkley, and Julius Erving. “I attempted to depict the four greatest Sixers from the team’s history.” Milou continued works in similar fashion throughout the years, another example including four quarterbacks from the Eagles - Norm VanBrocklin, Ron Jaworski, Randall Cunningham and Donovan McNabb. More recently, Milou created a 48x36in oil portrait of Eagles quarterback Carson Wentz titled Faith in Green. Upon the Eagles 2018 NFL Super Bowl LII win, Milou conceived Next Dog Up, a 4x5ft canvas depicting Vince Lombardi trophy topped by a German shepherd wearing an Eagles helmet, Rocky Balboa and cartoon character Underdog.

=== Commissions ===
In 2001 Milou was commissioned by the Philadelphia Museum of Art to create two large oil paintings. The pair of paintings portrayed the two famous facades of the building using Milou's take on Van Gogh style techniques. He was commissioned by the museum again in 2007 to paint a portrait of Benjamin Franklin in celebration of the founding father's 300th birthday.

=== Collaborations ===
In 2004 Milou teamed up with artist Charles Cushing to create a collaborative series of 8x5ft canvases depicting different streets of Philadelphia. Milou and Cushing had been painting outdoors together for years, so they claimed “the vibrant Philly street scene was a natural choice of subject.” “It’s spontaneous creation, we paint simultaneously – it’s like dueling brushes.” They then took the set of paintings, along with 500 signed and numbered lithograph prints, to the streets of Philadelphia to sell directly to customers and to local shops. The first painting in the series of Center City, Philadelphia, titled Uptown Philly 2000, was sold to a couple for $7,500. The second large canvas was a montage of Old City, Philadelphia where Milou lived at the time. Continuing in 2004, Milou alongside Thomas Dellapenna and Brett Sauce, created paintings of Kentucky Derby and Preakness Stakes winner Smarty Jones. The paintings were displayed together in Milou's gallery. He again worked with Dellapenna in 2005 to create their painting On The Town, which is 6x8ft with the hefty price tag of $12,500.

== Galleries ==
After working and promoting himself outdoors for years in Rittenhouse Square, Milou gained enough recognition and finance to open a gallery in the area. He saw initial potential in Philadelphia's market, opening his first gallery in 2003. The eponymous Perry Milou Gallery served as an indoor studio and exhibition for people to visit after watching him paint outdoors for the previous four years. In 2005 he moved the gallery to a different location down the street. Milou opened his third gallery Galleria 1903 in 2007, continuing to showcase his personal work as well as other local artists. After years as a gallerist in Philadelphia, the businessman in Milou had him looking to other larger markets where more people would be willing to invest in quality artwork at higher price points. After closing Galleria 1903 and leaving Philadelphia, Milou moved to Miami where he opened his fourth gallery in May 2008. Milou Gallery was located in Miami's Wynwood Art District, where Milou was hoping to capitalize on the art market that was fueled by the annual Art Basel showcase.

== Philanthropy and community involvement ==
In the late 1990s during the very start of his career, Milou opened American Milou’s Studio for Children in Bala Cynwyd, Pennsylvania. Through the 2000s’ Milou was involved in philanthropic organizations such as Co-Founder of Philadelphia Art for ALS, the Susan G. Komen Breast Cancer Foundation, an annual supporter of CVI, the Cardiovascular Institute of Philadelphia, MOCA Shakers and Gen. Art. In 2009 Milou provided a series of art workshops called “Palette Kids” while he was living in Miami, in collaboration with the Miami Children's Museum. Milou has sold several paintings in silent auctions and donated the proceeds to charitable organizations, including his own retrospective show in 2013 featuring 50 of his original paintings with proceeds donated to the Philadelphia Animal Welfare Society and One Fund Boston. Another being the Second Annual Bubby's Cook-off in 2014 in which the proceeds went to the Friendship Circle Foundation.

== Controversy ==
Milou regularly worked and displayed his finished paintings in the corner of Rittenhouse Square until the Park Commission got involved in 2002. The Commission claimed receiving several complaints about Milou, and though Milou claimed he never transacted a sale inside the park, the Commission director said that was irrelevant and began to enforce the no-solicitation policy by initiating ranger patrols through the Square. Milou said he planned to continue painting in the park.

== Personal life ==
Milou was raised in the Cheltenham-Mount Airy and Haverford suburbs near Philadelphia, Pennsylvania. He graduated from the University of Arizona, where he studied graphic design and illustration. While attending university, he was the first student to convince the Bachelor of Fine Arts program to include “open studio” as a major in 1990. After college he moved back to Philadelphia. Milou now resides in Pennsylvania with his wife, daughter and son.
