= Florida State Road 933 =

State highway in Florida, United States

State Road 933
- West 12th Avenue
- SR 933 highlighted in red

Route information
- Maintained by FDOT
- Length: 4.245 mi (6.832 km)
- Existed: 1983–present

Major junctions
- South end: SR 972 in Miami
- US 41 in Miami; US 27 in Miami
- North end: SR 112 in Miami

Location
- Country: United States
- State: Florida
- Counties: Miami-Dade

Highway system
- Florida State Highway System; Interstate; US; State; Former; Pre‑1945; Toll; Scenic
| ← SR 932 | → SR 934 |

State Road 933 (SR 933), locally known as West 12th Avenue, and Ronald W. Reagan Avenue, is a 4.25-mile (6.84 km) long north–south street entirely within the city limits of Miami, Florida. Its southern terminus is an intersection with Coral Way as Coral Way changes from Southwest 22nd Street to Southwest Third Avenue; its northern terminus is an interchange with the Airport Expressway (SR 112). North of the Dolphin Expressway (SR 836), reassurance signage is virtually nonexistent (only one near the SR 836 onramp for southbound motorists), and the only indication of SR 933 existing north of Northwest 14th Street is a pair of trailblazer signs on Northwest 36th Street (US 27-SR 25).

== Route description ==
State Road 933 begins at the intersection of Coral way and SW 12th Street, with SR 933 proceeding north on SW 12th Street. From here north to SW 11th Street, SR 933 passes through one of Miami's oldest residential developments, the Roads neighborhood, with many buildings the survivors of the Great Miami Hurricane of 1926. North of SW 11th Street, SR 933 enters Little Havana and its mixture of small businesses and residences, with intersections at US 41/SR 90 (Calle Ocho) and at Miami baseline road Flagler Street (becoming "NW"), and five blocks north of Flagler Street, passes two blocks east of Marlins Park. Just north of NW 7th Street, SR 933 crosses the Miami Canal, followed by an interchange with the Dolphin Expressway (State Road 836). Within one block of either direction of the Dolphin Expressway interchange, SR 933 passes by the Civic Center district, with government buildings, law offices and other buildings associated with the Miami-Dade county legal system, and is close to other businesses: hotels, a supermarket and a marine supply store.

Between NW 14th Street and NW 19th Street, SR 933 passes through a hospital complex comprising the Jackson Memorial Hospital, Cedars-Sinai Hospital, the Veterans Affairs Hospital, clinics associated with JMH, and Miami Dade College - Medical Center Campus. From NW 14th Street north to its northern terminus of the Airport Expressway (State Road 112), the Miami Metrorail is within 25 feet of SR 933, paralleling the state road. Between NW 19th Street and NW 24th Street, SR 933 goes through the Santa Clara business and industrial parks, and at NW 21st Street, has the Santa Clara Metrorail Station. North of NW 24th Street, the road goes through residential areas to its northern terminus, with an intersection with US 27 at NW 36th Street, with the Airport Expressway interchange three blocks north, State Road 933's northern terminus.

== History ==
The current edition of State Road 933 was applied in 1983 as a part of a statewide renumbering of the state roads that particularly affected state roads in Miami-Dade County. Prior to 1983, State Road 933 was applied to what is now known as State Road 915, also in Miami-Dade County.

== Major intersections ==
The entire route is in Miami, Miami-Dade County.

| mi | km | Destinations | Notes |
|---|---|---|---|
| 0.000 | 0.000 | SR 972 (Coral Way / Southwest 3rd Avenue) | Southwest 22nd Street |
| 1.005 | 1.617 | US 41 east (Southwest 8th Street) | Tamiami Trail; one-way eastbound |
| 1.065 | 1.714 | US 41 west (Southwest 7th Street) | One-way westbound |
| 1.464 | 2.356 | SR 968 east (Southwest 1st Street) | One-way eastbound |
| 1.530 | 2.462 | SR 968 west (Flagler Street) | One-way westbound; no northbound left turn |
| 2.083– 2.201 | 3.352– 3.542 | 12th Avenue Bridge over Miami River | |
| 2.36 | 3.80 | SR 836 east to I-95 / I-395 east – Downtown Miami, Miami Beach | |
| 2.364 | 3.804 | Northwest 12th Street to SR 836 west – Airport | |
| 4.033 | 6.490 | US 27 (Northwest 36th Street) to I-95 | |
| 4.245 | 6.832 | Northwest 40th Street to SR 112 west – Airport | Road continues north without designation |
1.000 mi = 1.609 km; 1.000 km = 0.621 mi: Electronic toll collection; Incomplete access
