= Coral Way (street) =

Street in Florida, United States

State Road 972
- Coral Way
- SR 972 highlighted in red

Route information
- Maintained by FDOT
- Length: 4.164 mi (6.701 km) Coral Way extends 16.3 miles (26.2 km) total
- Existed: 1922 (Coral Way); 1983 (as SR 972)–present

Major junctions
- West end: Douglas Road in Coral Gables
- East end: US 1 in Miami

Location
- Country: United States
- State: Florida
- Counties: Miami-Dade

Highway system
- Florida State Highway System; Interstate; US; State; Former; Pre‑1945; Toll; Scenic
← SR 970	→ SR 973

Coral Way, co-signed State Road 972 (SR 972) between Douglas Road and US 1 in Miami, is a 16.4-mile-long (26.4 km) primary east-west street that extends from Southwest 157th Avenue in western Miami-Dade County to Brickell Avenue (US 1) in the Brickell neighborhood of Downtown Miami, Florida.

== Route description ==
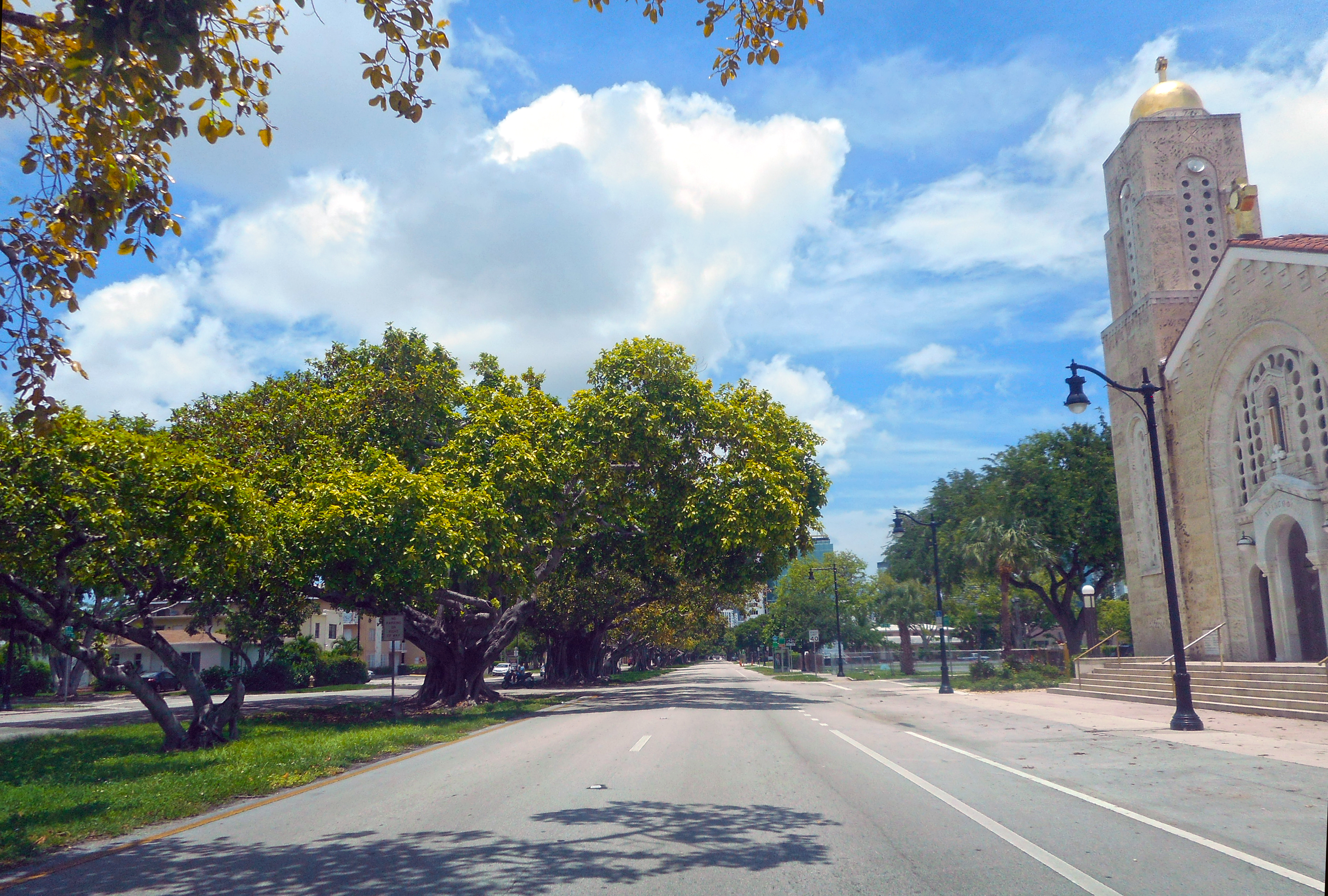
Coral Way with St. Sophia Orthodox Church near 24th Road and Third Avenue in Miami, June 2018

Coral Way begins as SW 26th Street at Southwest 157th Avenue in unincorporated Miami-Dade County as a mix of a residential street and commercial street. Just west of the Homestead Extension of Florida's Turnpike, Coral Way curves slightly to the north, becoming SW 24th Street as it passes over the Turnpike without an interchange. It continues through unincorporated Miami-Dade County, intersecting with Galloway Road, interchanging with the Palmetto Expressway, and Ludlam Road, becoming mostly residential east of Ludlam Road. At Red Road (Southwest 57th Avenue), Coral Way enters Coral Gables, becomes a two lane street, and begins a residential stretch of road in which Coral Way is covered under a natural canopy from each side of the road made of large oak, mahogany and other hardwood trees. At South Greenway Drive/Anderson Road, it exits the canopy, with the trees still lining the street, and it borders the Granada Golf Course for two blocks before a traffic circle turns Coral Way into a one way westbound street for two blocks further, with eastbound traffic taking Segovia Street south to Biltmore Way to rejoin Coral Way at the intersection with Le Jeune Road (SW 42nd Avenue). For the next half mile, Coral Way is also known as the Miracle Mile, the major east–west road through downtown Coral Gables. The median resumes with large date palm trees and flower beds lining the center of the road. The Miracle Mile ends at Douglas Road, with Coral Way leaving Coral Gables and entering Miami, and is also the western terminus of State Road 972.

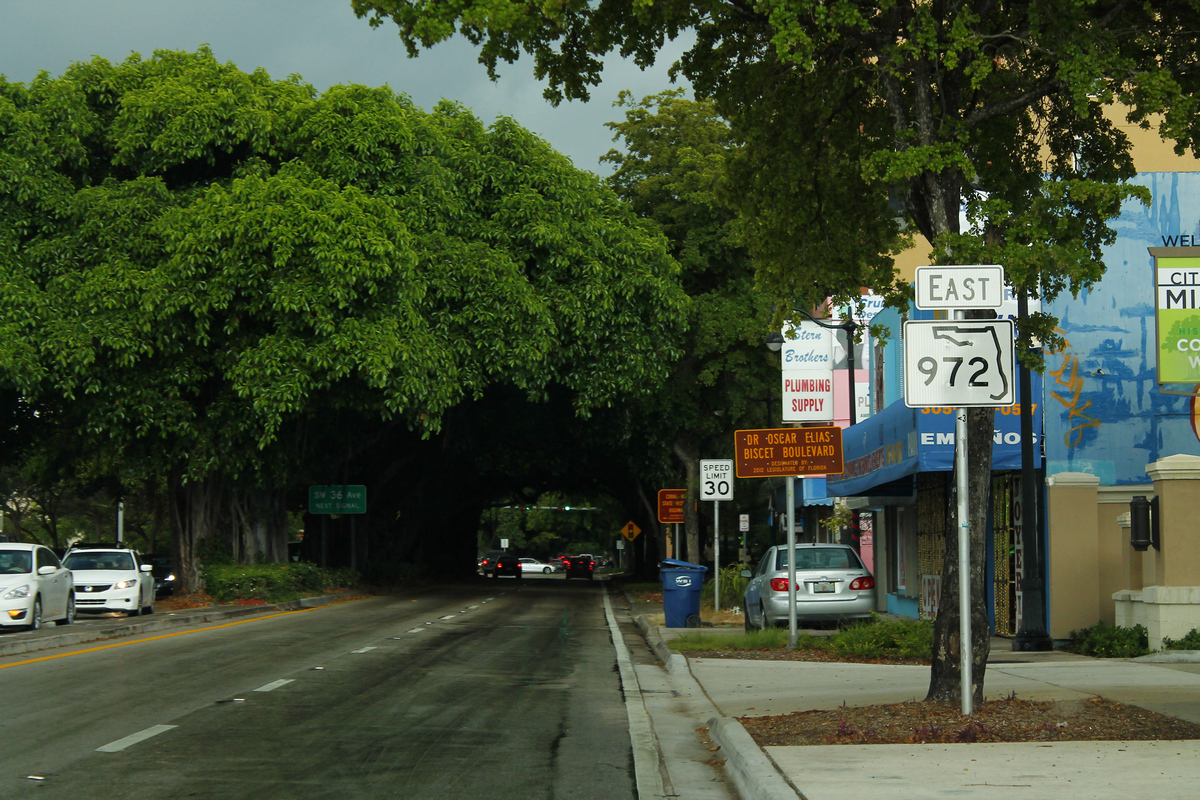
Florida State Road 972 sign on Coral Way in Coral Gables, May 2013

State Road 972 begins on the intersection between Coral Way/Southwest 22nd Street and Douglas Road (Southwest 37th Avenue) at the Coral Gables and Miami boundary, with SR 972 heading east into Miami. It runs as a 4-lane divided road with many old ficus and banyan trees in its median through a commercial area, passing by the Miracle Marketplace a few blocks east of the western terminus. It then intersects SW 27th Avenue (SR 9), and continues straight east until an intersection with SW 3rd Avenue in the Five Points neighborhood, where Coral Way veers northeast, becoming SW 3rd Avenue, and intersects with SW 12th Avenue (SR 933), still as a commercial road. After crossing under I-95 and intersecting with SW 15th Road/Broadway just east of I-95, the historic scenic drive of Coral Way ends, as it curves back into a purely eastern direction and becomes an undivided four lane road known also as SW 13th Street, heading into the core of central Miami. Four blocks east of SW 15th Road and one block east of Miami Avenue, where the road is known as SE 13th Street, SR 972 meet its eastern terminus of U.S. Route 1 (Brickell Avenue) in the downtown Miami Financial District.

== History ==
The Coral Way Corridor was built in 1922, connecting the city of Miami to Coral Gables with citrus lined streets. A few years later streetcar tracks were laid down the middle. In 1929, a roadside beautification program was started and 1,200 non-native banyan trees were planted along it.

In the years after the merger of Silver Bluff and Miami, Coral Way has been extended many times. Westward from SR 972, it now travels along Southwest 24th Street (Miracle Mile in eastern Coral Gables) until after passing over Florida's Turnpike, rounding a gentle chicane, and following Southwest 26th Street until its current terminus just west of Southwest 162nd Avenue. Although the newer sections of Coral Way west of Coral Gables do not have the scenery or the history of the current SR 972, they form an extremely important commercial link for Miami-Dade County.

=== SR 972 ===
Coral Way was designated as State Road 956 in 1980 and renumbered as State Road 972 in 1983. Originally, SR 972 extended 7.2 miles (11.6 km) further west along Southwest 24th Street to Southwest 107th Avenue (SR 985), near Tamiami Park and Florida International University. A series of truncations started in the late 1990s, first moving the western terminus 2.0 miles (3.2 km) eastward to SR 973 (Galloway Road/Southwest 87th Avenue), then another 4.5 miles (7.2 km) to SR 953 (LeJeune Road) in Coral Gables – the exit signs on the Palmetto Expressway were replaced with ones without the State Road designation in 2001 – and, at the request of businesses along the Miracle Mile stretch of Coral Way, a final move of the western terminus one-half mile to its current location. Ironically, the final move re-established SR 972 on the original, pre-1926 configuration of Coral Way (many commercially prepared maps still show an intersection with LeJeune Road as the western terminus).

== Major intersections ==
The entire route is in Miami-Dade County.

Location	mi	km	Destinations	Notes
Tamiami	0.000	0.000	Southwest 157th Avenue	Western terminus
Tamiami			SR 825 (Southwest 137th Avenue)	
Westchester			Southwest 117th Avenue; To Florida's Turnpike Extension (SR 821) – Airport	
Westchester			SR 985 (Southwest 107th Avenue) – Sweetwater, Miami-Dade County, Fontainebleau, Doral, Kendall	
Westchester			SR 973 (Southwest 87th Avenue) – Fontainebleau, Doral, Kendall	
Westchester–Coral Terrace line			SR 826 (Palmetto Expressway) – Airport	Interchange
Coral Terrace–Coral Gables line			SR 959 (Southwest 57th Avenue) – South Miami, West Miami, Flagami	
Coral Gables			SR 953 (West 42nd Avenue / LeJeune Road) – Airport, Hialeah	Coral Way continues east as "Miracle Mile"
Coral Gables–Miami line			Southwest 37th Avenue / Douglas Road	Western terminus of SR 972; Coral Way continues west as "Miracle Mile"
Miami			SR 9 (Southwest 27th Avenue / Unity Boulevard) – Coconut Grove	
Miami			SR 933 north (Southwest 12th Avenue)	
Miami			Pioneers Road / Southwest 26th Road - Rickenbacker Causeway, Key Biscayne, Marine Labs, Parks & Beaches	
Miami			To I-95 north / US 1 north / Southwest 25th Road / Mary Brickell Road	
Miami	16.004	25.756	Brickell Avenue	Eastern terminus; former US 1 (SR 5)
1.000 mi = 1.609 km; 1.000 km = 0.621 mi
