= Douglas Road (Miami) =

Road in Miami, Florida, United States

Douglas Road / Pine Island Road
- West 37th Avenue; West 89th Avenue
- Length: 20.4 mi (32.8 km) (non-contiguous)
- Location: Miami-Dade and Broward counties, Florida
- South end: Edgewater Drive in Coral Gables
- Major junctions: US 1 / SR 5 / South Dixie Highway in Miami; SR 972 (Coral Way) / Southwest 22nd Street in Miami/Coral Gables; US 41 (Tamiami Trail) / SR 90 / Southwest 8th Street in Miami/Coral Gables; SR 968 (Flagler Street) in Miami; SR 836 (Dolphin Expressway) in Miami; US 27 / SR 25 / Northwest 36th Street in Miami; SR 826 (Palmetto Expressway) in Miami Gardens; SR 860 (Miami Gardens Drive) / Northwest 183rd Street in Miami Gardens; SR 820 (Pines Boulevard) in Pembroke Pines; SR 818 (Griffin Road) in Davie; I-595 / SR 84 in Davie/Plantation
- North end: Nob Hill Road in Parkland

Construction
- Inauguration: 1923

Douglas Road, also West 37th Avenue on the greater Miami grid plan and West 89th Avenue in Miramar and Pembroke Pines, is a 20.4-mile (32.8 km) north–south thoroughfare running west of downtown Miami in Miami-Dade County and Broward County, Florida. The road is instead named Pine Island Road in Broward County north of Sheridan Street and Coral Springs Drive in Coral Springs.

== Route description ==
Douglas Road begins as Southwest 37th Avenue at Edgewater Drive in Coral Gables, immediately west of the city of Miami in Coconut Grove, headed north toward South Dixie Highway (US 1). Soon after crossing US 1, it crosses Bird Road (SR 976), straddling the border of Miami and Coral Gables. Going northward, it crosses Coral Way (SR 972) and the Tamiami Trail (US 41) before crossing Miami grid baseline Flagler Street (SR 968).

Douglas Road continues northward as Northwest 37th Avenue, crossing a fork of the Miami River before ending at Northwest South River Drive on the south bank of the Miami River, near Miami International Airport. The second segment begins at Northwest North River Drive on the north bank of the Miami River, continuing through Northwest 79th Street (SR 934) and ending again just beyond 79th Street at the Miami Amtrak station.

The road begins briefly again in a small segment between Northwest 103rd Street and Northwest 106th Street, just east of Hialeah.

The final segment of Douglas Road begins at Ali Baba Avenue in Opa-locka, briefly forming the eastern border of the Miami–Opa Locka Executive Airport and continuing northward through Miami Gardens, interchanging with the Palmetto Expressway (SR 826) and crossing Miami Gardens Drive (SR 860). After passing under the Homestead Extension of Florida's Turnpike without an interchange, the road crosses into Broward County and Miramar, becoming Southwest 89th Avenue.

The road continues north through Miramar and Pembroke Pines, becoming Northwest 89th Avenue north of Pines Boulevard (SR 820). Upon crossing Sheridan Street and leaving Pembroke Pines, it becomes Pine Island Road and continues through Cooper City and Davie, interchanging with Interstate 595 and SR 84 at the border of Davie and Plantation. It then continues north through Plantation and Sunrise, intersecting Broward Boulevard, to Tamarac and then Coral Springs, where it changes names again to Coral Springs Drive. After crossing under the Sawgrass Expressway (SR 869), the road changes names back to Pine Island Road and enters Parkland, where it ends at Nob Hill Road.

== History ==
Forming the eastern boundary of Coral Gables, George Merrick used the frontage of the home of John Douglas as the north–south road junction into the city from Coral Way in September 1923.

== See also ==
- Douglas Entrance
- Douglas Road (Metrorail station)
