= Greater Miami Expressway Agency =

Independent agency governed by the state of Florida

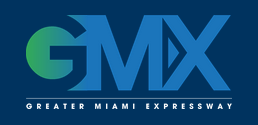
- Current logo of GMX

Agency overview
- Formed: 1994
- Jurisdiction: Miami-Dade County, Florida
- Headquarters: Miami, Florida
- Website: https://www.gmx-way.com/

The Greater Miami Expressway Agency (GMX) (formerly the Miami-Dade Expressway Authority, MDX) is an independent agency governed by the state of Florida. Since 1997, GMX has operated and maintained five expressways that run within the county.

All five expressways are all electronic toll roads, requiring the use of SunPass or a "toll-by-plate" program and does not accept cash, and the free movement sections were removed. The Gratigny Parkway, Don Shula and Snapper Creek Expressways became all electronic in 2010, while the Airport and Dolphin Expressways were converted in 2014.

== History ==
=== Beginnings (1994–2018) ===
The agency's old logo when it was MDX

In December 1994, the state of Florida along with the Miami-Dade County commission created the Miami-Dade Expressway Authority. This gave the county full control of five toll-road expressways that were formerly under the control of the Florida Department of Transportation (FDOT). Those were the Gratigny Parkway (State Road 924, SR 924), Airport Expressway (SR 112), Dolphin Expressway (SR 836), Don Shula Expressway (SR 874), and the Snapper Creek Expressway (SR 878). Control took effect in 1997.

Since then, MDX has completed projects both independently and in collaboration with FDOT most notably the western expansion on the Dolphin Expressway in 2004 and the Dolphin–Palmetto Interchange in 2009.

=== Takeover by the state (2019-present) ===
Problems began to arise in 2014 when MDX doubled its toll-enforcement. This caused backlash by many.

In 2017, then State Representative Jeanette Nunez pushed a law ordering MDX to reduce its tolls.

In 2019, the state took over MDX.

In August 2023, a judge ruled that operations are to be taken over by GMX. Since then, MDX leaders have been fighting to regain control.

== Markings ==
All GMX highways use the shield-shaped signs reserved by FDOT for toll roads, with the GMX logo attached below the shield. In addition, all GMX highways use a uniquely designed mileage marker. Instead of the green "MILE XX" markers commonly seen on Interstate Highways, the five GMX expressways use blue mileage markers featuring (from top to bottom, in white): a single letter indicating the direction of travel, the State Road designation of the highway (complete with outline of the State of Florida), and two numbers separated by a horizontal line ("2" on the top, "4" on the bottom of the line represents Mile Marker 2.4 from either the southern or western end of the expressway). These markers are placed on the edge of the shoulder every 0.2 miles (0.32 km) along the expressway. The Gratigny Parkway has two of these (mile markers 5.0 and 5.2) on a surface street near Opa-locka on Northwest 119th Street just east of the end of its easternmost ramp).

Prior to the removal of free movement sections, on portions of a GMX route where no tolls are ahead, the TOLL in the green section of the TOLL shield was removed.

== Expressways ==
=== Airport Expressway ===
SR 112, locally known as Airport Expressway is a four-mile-long (6.4 km) east–west expressway connecting Miami International Airport in Miami to Interstate 95 (I-95) and I-195, which ultimately connects to Miami Beach.

=== Dolphin Expressway ===
SR 836, locally known as the Dolphin Expressway, is a 13.8-mile-long (22.2 km) toll road currently extending from Southwest 137th Avenue in the west to I-95 in the east. The section of roadway east of I-95 is designated as I-395 or the MacArthur Causeway.

=== Don Shula Expressway ===
SR 874, locally known as the Don Shula Expressway, is seven miles (11 km) long, connecting the Homestead Extension of Florida's Turnpike and Palmetto Expressway in central Miami-Dade County, Florida. As of July 17, 2010, the Don Shula Expressway no longer accepts cash.

=== Snapper Creek Expressway ===
SR 878, locally known as the Snapper Creek Expressway, stretches for three miles (4.8 km) between Don Shula Expressway (SR 874) and U.S. Highway 1 (US 1, South Dixie Highway). This provides access to Kendall and South Miami. Although constructed, improved and maintained through toll revenue, the Snapper Creek Expressway was untolled until July 17, 2010, when open road tolling (ORT) was initiated on the expressway.

=== Gratigny Parkway ===
SR 924, locally known as Gratigny Parkway, is a 5.2-mile-long (8.4 km) limited access all-electronic toll road running east to west. The Gratigny Parkway starts east of the Palmetto Expressway/I-75 interchange in Hialeah and ends at Northwest 32nd Avenue in North Miami. The section of roadway east of NW 32nd Avenue is a surface street (Northwest 119th Street) also known as Gratigny Road. Despite its relatively short length, SR 924 is a major east–west artery in northern Miami-Dade County, Florida.

== See also ==
- Transportation in Miami
