= Miami Children's Museum =

Children's museum in Miami, Florida, U.S.

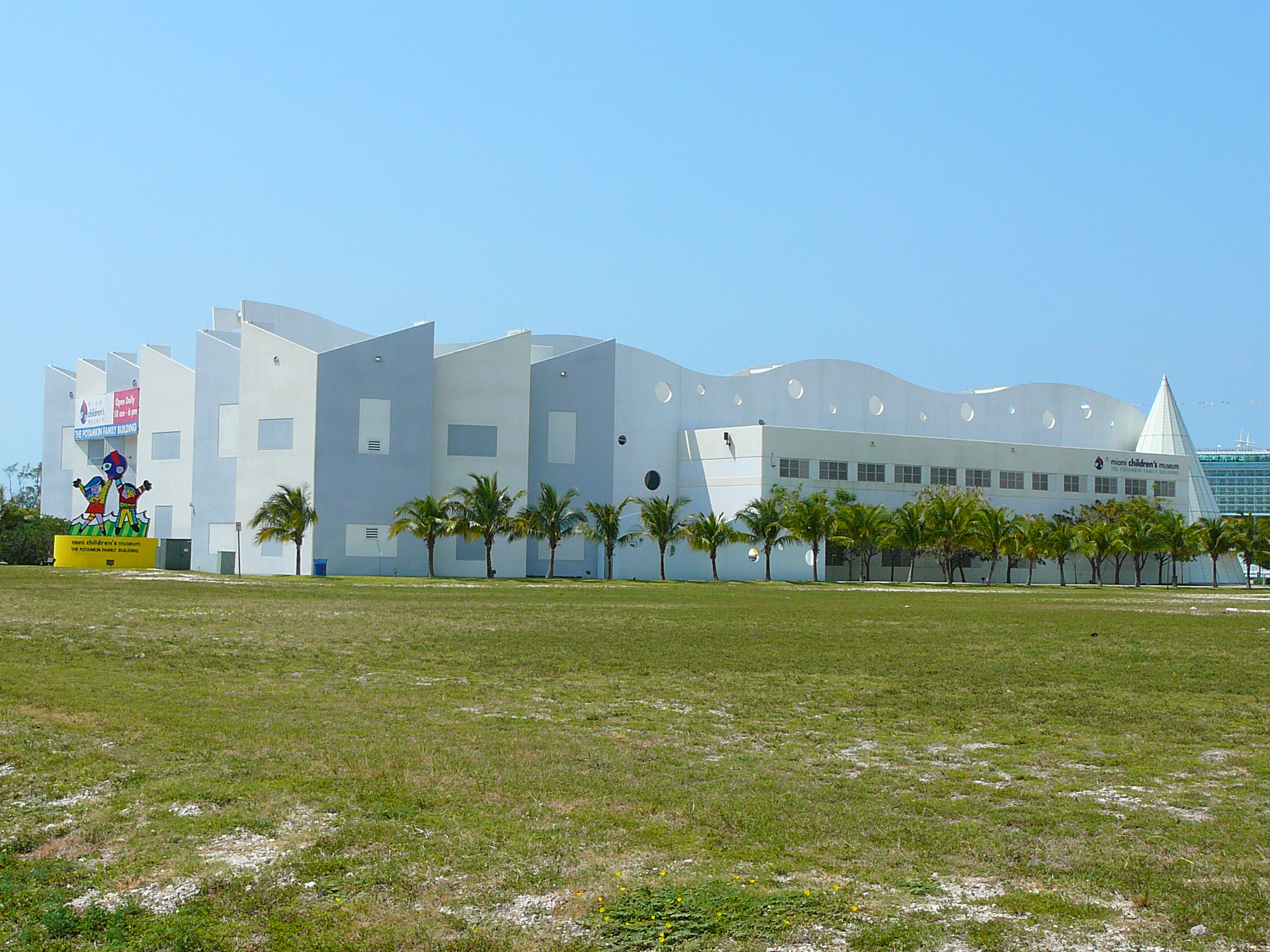
- Miami Children's Museum in 2008

- Location within Florida
- Established: 1983
- Location: 980 MacArthur Causeway, Miami, Florida, U.S.
- Coordinates: 25.784698°N 80.176519°W
- Type: Children's museum
- Director: Deborah Spiegelman
- Public transit access: Metrobus S line
- Website: miamichildrensmuseum.org

The Miami Children’s Museum (formerly the Miami Youth Museum) is a non-profit educational institution located on Watson Island in the city of Miami, Florida, United States. The museum focuses on programs, classes and learning materials related to arts, culture, community and communication. They also provide support for bilingual and disabled children.

== History ==
Founded in 1983, the museum was originally named the Miami Youth Museum. In 1985, the museum opened a 2,000 square-foot facility in a mall on Sunset Drive. In 1986, the museum was relocated to the Bakery Center shopping mall in South Miami and expanded their facility to 4,000 square feet. During this time the museum's attendance increased from around 10,000 to nearly 20,000. Over the next few years the museum continued to expand in both exhibition space and in attendance, in part due to the community outreach program established in 1987. The museum reached a peak of 47,686 visitor capacity during this time, and the community outreach program expanded to serve 899,000 people.

In 1991, the museum received its first grant from the State of Florida Cultural Facilities. The next year the museum board began plans for the construction of a new facility, and over the next few years received nearly $2 million including a lead gift of $1 million. One of these grants was a prestigious Institute of Museum and Library Services grant.

The pending demolition of the Bakery Center in 1996 forced the museum to temporarily relocate to the Miracle Center in Coral Gables, Florida. At this time, the museum was looking for a site for the new facility. In partnership with Miami Dade County, the museum secured a site at the Vizcaya Metro-Rail Station in 1996. The following year, 1997, the museum changed its name to Miami Children’s Museum.

In 2000, neighborhood opposition and the threat of protracted litigation caused the Board of Directors of Miami Children’s Museum to seek a new site for the building. A new leadership committee was formed to find a new building site, chaired by Alan Potamkin and Norman Braman, and the committee raised $8.2 million by the end of 2000. They identified a site on Watson Island and in 2001 the plans were finalized. In 2002 the State of Florida awarded $500,000 to the museum, bringing funding from the State to $2.4 million. The campaign achieved over 90% of the goal, $16.1 million in the first six months of the year. In 2003, the Miami Children’s Museum (MCM) opened in a new 56,500 square foot facility on Watson Island, near Downtown Miami, where it is still located today. The facility was designed by Arquitectonica, and the museum continued to expand the scope of their facilities through the construction of a charter school area in 2005 and 2006, helped in part by a $500,000 grant from the State of Florida Division of Cultural Affairs.

The museum now includes 14 permanent galleries, pre-school classrooms, a parent/teacher resource center, a Kid Smart educational gift shop, a 200-seat auditorium and a Subway restaurant. The museum now claims to have had over 5 million guests since 2003 and to reach over 400,000 annual visitors.
