= Tamiami Trail =

Highway in Florida

- U.S. Highway 41; Historic U.S. Highway 94; East Trail
- Tamiami Trail highlighted in red

Route information
- Length: 284 mi (457 km)
- Existed: 1928–present
- Tourist routes: Tamiami Trail Scenic Highway

Major junctions
- South end: US 1 in Miami
- I-95 in Miami; Florida's Turnpike Extension in Tamiami; I-275 near Memphis
- North end: SR 60 in Tampa

Location
- Country: United States
- State: Florida

Highway system
- Florida State Highway System; Interstate; US; State; Former; Pre‑1945; Toll; Scenic
← SR 93	US 94 (FL)	→ SR 94
← US 93	US 94	→ US 95
← US 90	SR 90	→ SR 91

The Tamiami Trail (/ˈtæmiˌæmi/) is the southernmost 284 miles (457 km) of U.S. Highway 41 (US 41) from State Road 60 (SR 60) in Tampa to US 1 in Miami. A portion of the road is officially State Road 90 (SR 90), but not signposted as such.

The 163-mile (262 km) north–south section (unsignposted SR 45) extends to Naples, whereupon it becomes an east–west road (unsignposted SR 90) crossing the Everglades (and forming part of the northern border of Everglades National Park). It becomes Southwest 8th Street in Miami-Dade County, famously known as Calle Ocho through the Little Havana neighborhood of Miami (and site of the eponymous annual festival), before ending east of Miami Avenue as Southeast 8th Street at Brickell Avenue in Brickell, Downtown Miami.

== History ==
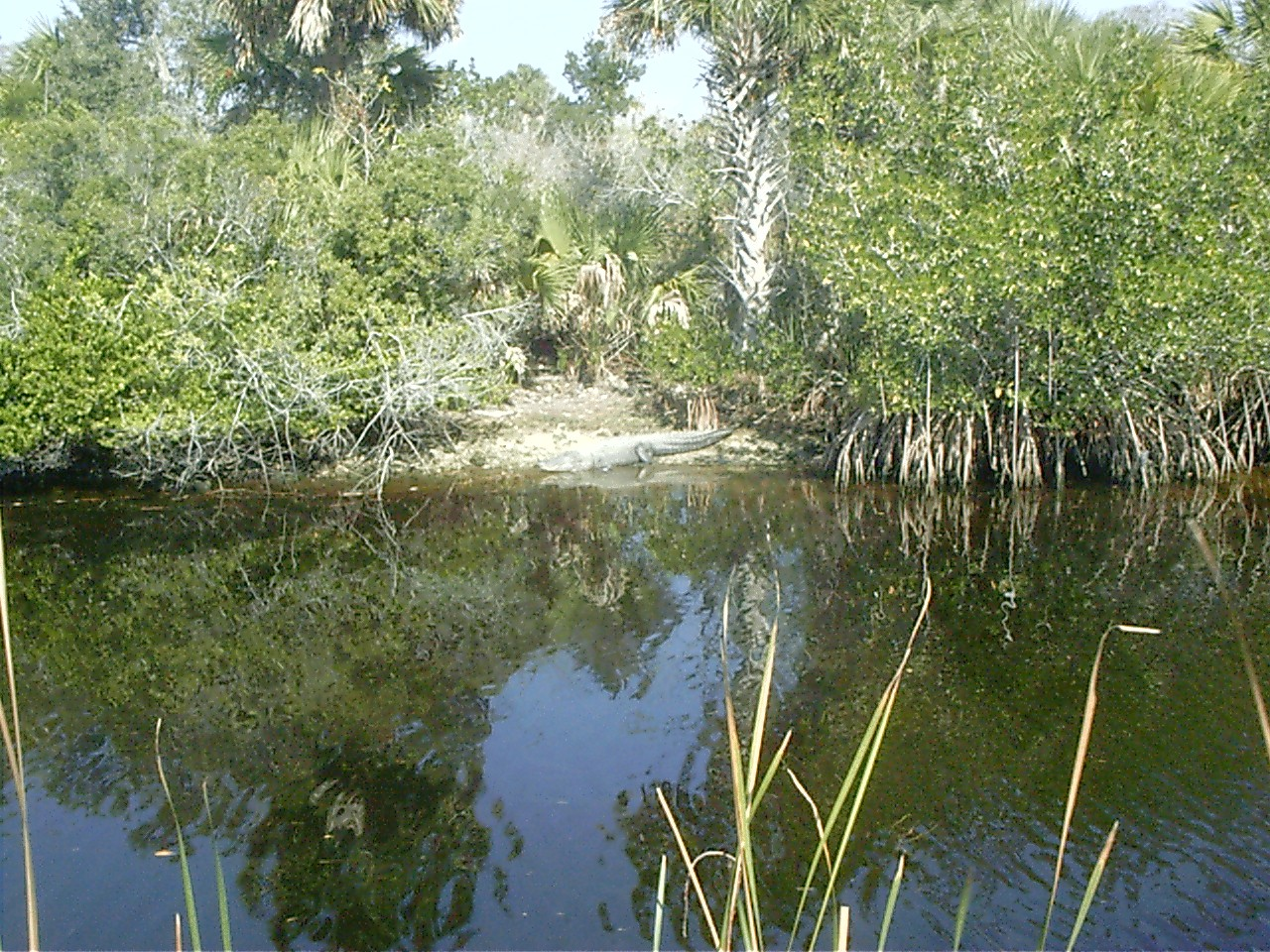
Alligators are a common sight along the scenic Tamiami Trail from Miami to Naples. Unlike its sister Alligator Alley, the trail is only one lane in each direction and has no fences to keep wildlife from traversing it.

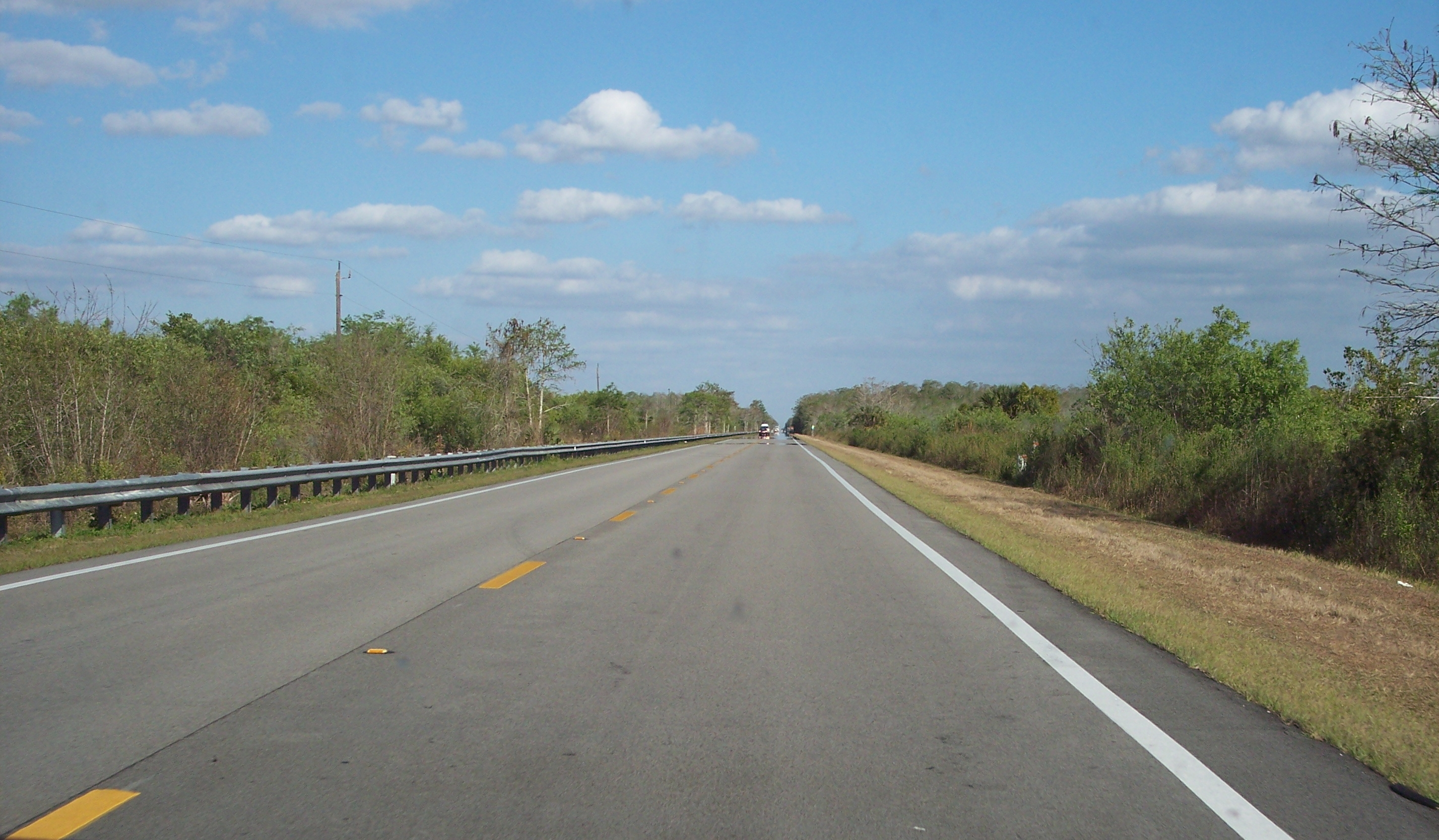
Tamiami Trail seen toward east in the Big Cypress National Preserve, a few miles north of the Everglades National Park

=== Construction and early designations ===
The idea for a trans-peninsula highway that connected the west and east coasts of Florida originated in April 1915 at an informal meeting in Tallahassee between Francis W. Perry, then president of the Fort Myers Chamber of Commerce, and James F. Jaudon of Miami, after which they returned to their respective cities and began advocating for the construction of what was originally called the Miami to Marco Highway. At a subsequent meeting in Orlando, on June 10, 1915, of what became the Central Florida Highway Association, Perry introduced a resolution which was seconded by Tampa's E. P. Dickie, for the construction of the "Tamiami Trail", which was to run from Tampa through Riverview, Bradenton, Sarasota, Arcadia, Punta Gorda, Fort Myers, Estero, Bonita Springs, Naples, Marco, then east directly across the state to Miami. Perry traced the route of the proposed Tamiami Trail on a map and accorded the credit for coining the word "Tamiami" to Dickie, although D. C. Gillett, who was president of the Tampa Board of Trade, later claimed to have originally suggested the name.

On August 3, 1915, the Board of Commissioners of Dade County agreed to fund part of the survey for the road by providing their county engineer. Two days later a team surveyed the first 3.5 miles (5.6 km), and the work on the Tamiami Trail had officially begun. The team consisted of Hobart Crabtree (county engineer), James F. Jaudon, L. T. Highleyman, Van Cleve Hallowes, Wallace Culbertson, Walter Ludlam, J. T. Albritton, A. W. Frederick and one helper.

At the time, Lee County was a much larger county (Collier and Hendry counties were created out of Lee County in 1923). In 1919, for financial reasons, Lee County was unable to complete its portion of the Tamiami Trail. Jaudon had already purchased 207,360 acres (83,920 ha) of land, mostly in Monroe County. His company, the Chevelier Corporation, came to the rescue and offered to build a link of the highway through its holdings in Monroe County if Dade and Lee counties would agree to re-route the Tamiami Trail through Monroe County. The proposal was accepted; the Chevelier Corporation began laying out a new route for the road and in 1921 began construction on the new segment of the Tamiami Trail. This segment is today known as Loop Road (located in Big Cypress National Preserve).

In 1922, the State of Florida ran out of construction funds for the east–west portion. The following year, Barron Collier, an advertising mogul who had recently diversified his holdings by investing in various types of businesses and millions of acres of southwest Florida wilderness, pledged that he would bankroll the completion of the Tamiami Trail; in return, the State legislature would establish a new county and name it after him.

So in 1923, Collier County was created out of the southern portion of Lee County. Almost immediately contention arose over the change of the route. The sponsors of the new county advocated for the original route, which was completely inside the boundaries of Collier County, and the State Road Department agreed with Collier County. Even so, the Board of County Commissioners of Dade County supported the Chevelier segment, since so much money had already been invested, and only a few miles of road were left to be completed.

Despite this protest, the State Road Department reinstated the original route of the Tamiami Trail to be completed, and the already completed portion of roadway in Monroe County was accepted as a "South Loop" of the Tamiami Trail. As construction of the north–south section resumed, Collier hired A. R. Richardson to be the head engineer of the Naples-to-Miami section. A few months later, A. W. Frederick replaced Richardson, who returned to the Everglades Drainage District.

The Tamiami Trail Blazers would launch an expedition leaving out of Fort Myers on April 4, 1923, with the goal of reaching Miami. The Blazers wanted to do this as a publicity stunt to try to get national attention. It would consist of a motorcade of 10 vehicles, a commissary truck, 7 Ford Model T's, an Elcar and a tractor, conveying 29 people (25 men and 4 women). The party consisted of members of Florida county boards, the road department, as well as several native guides, most likely Seminoles. When the expedition did not arrive on time, it was speculated they had become lost and likely died which drew national attention to the expedition. Planes were sent to try to find them and parties to rescue them would be dispatched from both coasts. The expedition did end up making it to Miami. The first 11 would come to Miami 19 days after it started and the rest would come a few days later, but the expedition did lose three of their vehicles. Construction started on the east–west stretch later that year, thanks to funding from Barron Collier.

In 1926, both the north–south section and the east–west stretch were designated U.S. highways. Although the Trail was intended to be one road, the two sections received two different numbers: as each section was completed, the north–south portion received US 41 signs, and the east–west stretch was designated US 94 upon completion (to comply with the route-numbering guidelines of AASHTO). In addition, both sections south of Fort Myers received the State Road 27 designation.

North of Fort Myers, it was designated State Road 5.

While a 1927 Rand McNally map indicated the southern terminus at Fort Myers, US 41 signs had already been erected on the completed segment (south to Naples) in late 1926; US 94 signs made their appearances when the final section was completed in April 1928. The Tamiami Trail took 13 years, cost $8 million (equivalent to $118 million in 2025), and used 2.6 million sticks of dynamite in its construction. The Tamiami Trail officially opened on April 26, 1928. To celebrate, a convoy of over 500 cars would leave out of Tampa on the morning of April 25 and arrive in Miami during the late part of the next day.

=== US 94 ===
U.S. Highway 94 sign, c. 1930s

Upon the completion of the Tamiami Trail, U.S. Highway 94 (US 94) extended from the intersection of Ninth Street South and Fifth Avenue South in Naples (the southern terminus of US 41) to the intersection of South Eighth Street and Brickell Avenue (US 1) in Miami. At the time it was considered a major achievement of engineering that was the only route from Naples (and, by extension, from Tampa) to the southeastern coast of Florida.

In 1945, a restructuring of Florida's State Road system resulted in the removal of the SR 27 signs from US 94 and the assignment of the unsignposted Florida Department of Transportation designation State Road 90, which continues to be applied to the east–west stretch of highway to this day. The north-south section was designated State Road 45.

In 1949, the US 94 signage was replaced with US 41 signs, over a decade after AASHO modified its guidelines to discourage short (under 300 mi or 480 km) U.S. Highways that are entirely within one state.

=== After US 94 ===
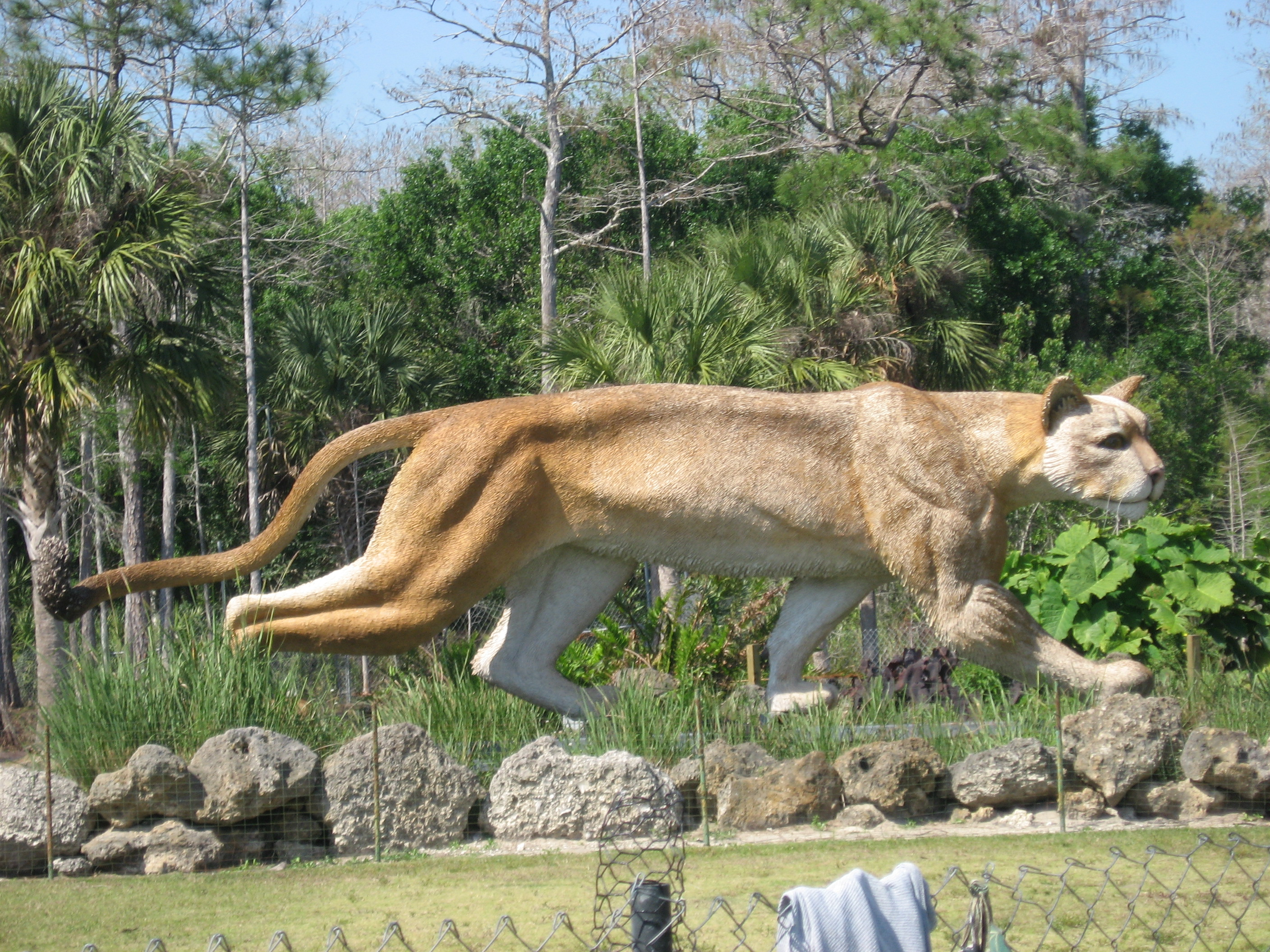
Roadside attractions, sometimes called tourist traps, were a part of the folk character of Tamiami before the interstates. Today, some of these attractions remain, including this greeter/creature at the Skunk-Ape Research Headquarters in Ochopee.

A US 41 shield used in Florida prior to 1993

In the 1950s, the newly configured US 41 was extended eastward and northward, first to downtown Miami along US 1 in 1950, then to Miami Beach along US 1 and SR A1A in 1953.

The alignment of the Tamiami Trail and US 41 at the north end between Tampa and Palmetto was also changed in the 1950s. The original alignment ran further inland through Riverview and Parrish. The route was realigned to its current route through Ruskin and Apollo Beach in 1951, which had previously been designated US 541. The original inland alignment was then redesignated as an extension of US 301.

In 1965, US 41 was rerouted as a bypass along unsigned SR 45A around Venice Gardens, while Business US 41 signs mark the three-mile-long (4.8 km) former alignment (which is still named Tamiami Trail).

This configuration of US 41 south of Tampa remained intact until the U.S. Highway was truncated to US 1 and Southwest Eighth Street in Miami in 2001—the historic eastern terminus of US 94, former SR 27, and current SR 90 (westbound US 41 and SR 90 now begin one block to the north, on Southwest Seventh Street, as the easternmost 2.7 miles (4.3 km) of the U.S. Highway now lie along a one-way pair).

While US 41 and SR 90 have not significantly changed since the 1960s (aside from the widening to the east of SR 997 in Miami-Dade County in the 1970s and in 2002-2005), its importance to motorists of southeastern Florida has changed since the opening of Alligator Alley (I-75) to the north in 1968. Since then, traffic on the Tamiami Trail across the Everglades has lessened significantly, while urban sections of the road are now often congested.

In 1968, the Dade County Port Authority began construction on what was to become the world's largest airport. The Miami Jetport was located 36 miles (58 km) west of Miami, just across the Collier County line. It was to be a six-runway supersonic airport. The project would also transform the Tamiami Trail into a multi-lane expressway. Conservationists were worried about the impact an airport that size would have on the environment of the Everglades and Big Cypress. After several court hearings, a ban was placed upon further development. The widening of Tamiami Trail as a part of the Jetport had been stopped. One runway had already been completed; so the runway was allowed to be used as a flight training center. The runway remains today as a part of the Dade-Collier Training and Transition Airport.

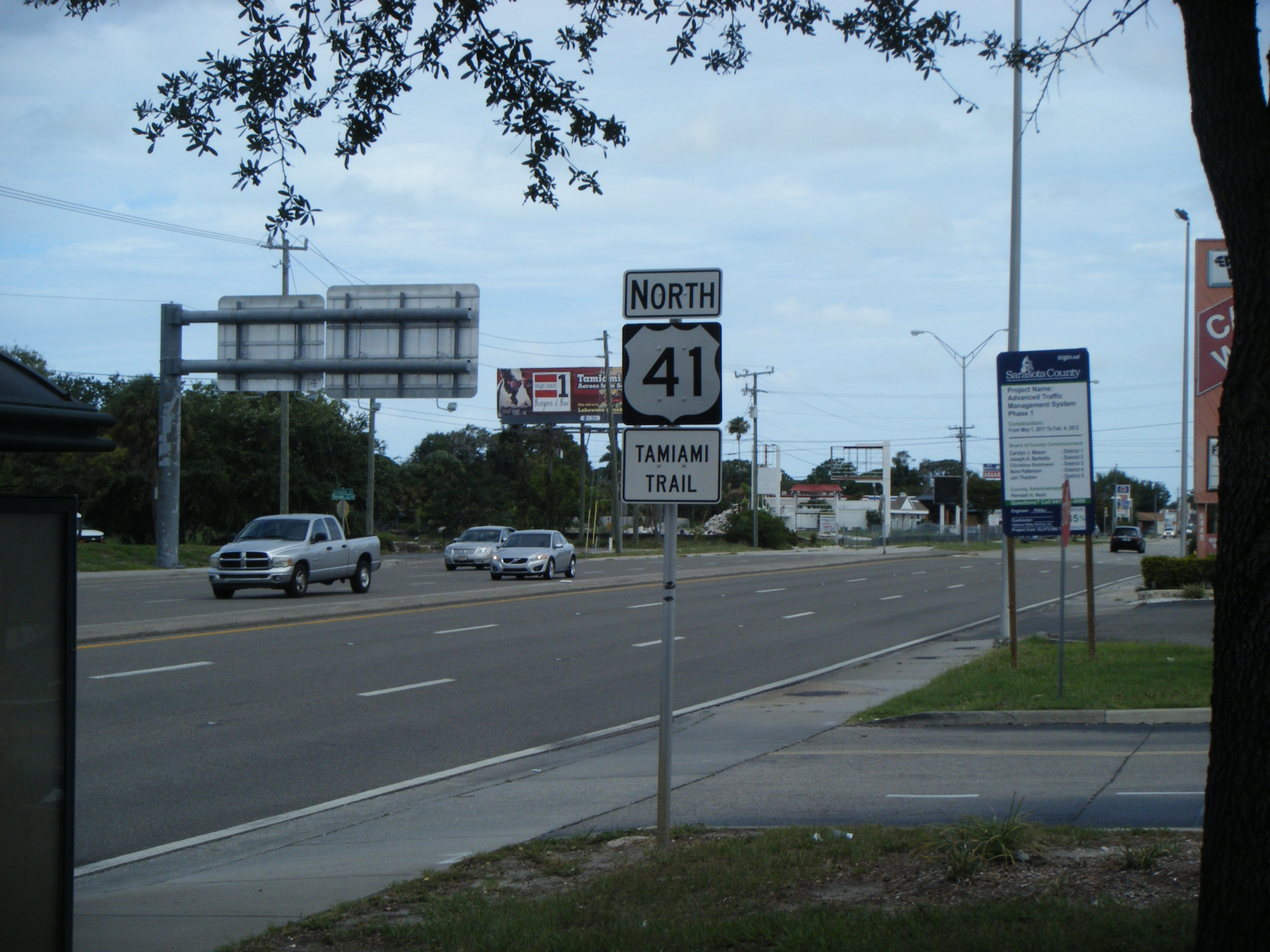
Tamiami Trail (US 41) northbound past SR 72 in Gulf Gate Estates

Also in 1968, construction of an extension of Interstate 75 (I-75) south from Tampa to Miami was started, with an eye toward routing the freeway along an upgraded Tamiami Trail from Naples to a soon-to-be completed SR 836 whereupon it would continue on the east–west highway to its intended terminus at an interchange with I-95. However, planners made the decision in 1973 to shift I-75's proposed route to instead cross the Everglades along Alligator Alley over environmental concerns related to upgrading the Tamiami Trail, which runs along the northern border of Everglades National Park. Additionally, Alligator Alley itself needed upgrading, as the then-narrow toll road was dangerous to both motorists and wildlife (most notably the Florida panther) alike, and SR 836, with its left exits and narrow lanes, was not being built to Interstate Highway standards, with the costs to upgrade it being too expensive. As a result, construction for a rerouted I-75 in southern Florida began in 1974, now with I-75 using Alligator Alley instead of US 41 to cross the peninsula. The configured Interstate would not be completed for another 19 years.

Since then, the Tamiami Trail has been designated a National Scenic Byway by the United States Department of Transportation for its unique scenery in the Everglades and the Big Cypress National Preserve.

On February 25, 2025, Florida senator Joe Gruters introduced a bill that would have renamed a portion of the Tamiami Trail to the "Gulf of America Trail" to celebrate President Donald Trump’s renaming of the Gulf of Mexico on federal maps and documents. However, on March 4, he withdrew his proposal due to public criticism.

== Proposed improvements ==
The roadway and the Tamiami Canal have acted as a dam to block water flow from Lake Okeechobee to Florida Bay at the southern tip of the peninsula. As a result, the Everglades has had its water flow greatly diminished over the years, resulting in a devastating impact on the ecology of the region.

In the 1990s, a few canals were filled and additional culverts were constructed under US 41 to help regulate water flow. According to the United States Army Corps of Engineers, this was only a partial solution to the problems of the Everglades and the Tamiami Trail. In 2003, after considering a variety of plans involving the rebuilding of US 41/SR 90, the Corps recommended that a 3,000-foot-long (910 m) causeway be built near the Northeast Shark Slough northeast of Everglades National Park, all road fill removed that would otherwise be adjacent to the bridge, the 57 culverts that are already in place maintained, and the appropriate water flow rate maintained under the non-causeway portions of the Tamiami Trail crossing the Everglades. The proposed causeway is being called the Everglades Skyway by the Sierra Club, Audubon Society, World Wildlife Fund, and other organizations in an Internet-based effort to lobby Florida and United States government officials for project construction money. In December 2009, construction began on a one-mile-long (1.6 km) project to lift a portion of the road to allow the more natural water flow into the southern Everglades. At the Everglades Foundation's America's Everglades Summit held in mid-May 2010, Assistant Secretary of the U.S. Department of Interior, Thomas Strickland, revealed that the Interior Department's National Park Service released a draft Environmental Impact Statement recommending an additional 5.5 miles (8.9 km) of bridging the Tamiami Trail. The Everglades Foundation is a group that supports the Tamiami Trail bridging and dedicated to Everglades restoration.

In 2013, Florida announced a $90 million commitment to elevate 2.6 miles (4.2 km) of the road to allow natural drainage into the Everglades and Everglades National Park.

In June 2019, a $60 million grant was announced by the Federal Highway Administration (FHWA) to Everglades National Park through the Nationally Significant Federal Lands and Tribal Projects program to complete the Tamiami Trail Next Steps project, intended to allow more north-to-south water flow into the Everglades. This grant matches a $43.5 million commitment by the State of Florida for the raising and reconstruction of the remaining 6.5 miles (10.5 km) of the eastern Tamiami Trail roadway.

As of September 2020, the plan to complete and finish the Tamiami Trail has been approved for the final steps of the project. These plans to begin the final steps will start November 2020 and should be finished by the end of 2024.
