= Miracle Marketplace =

Shopping mall in Miami, Florida, United States

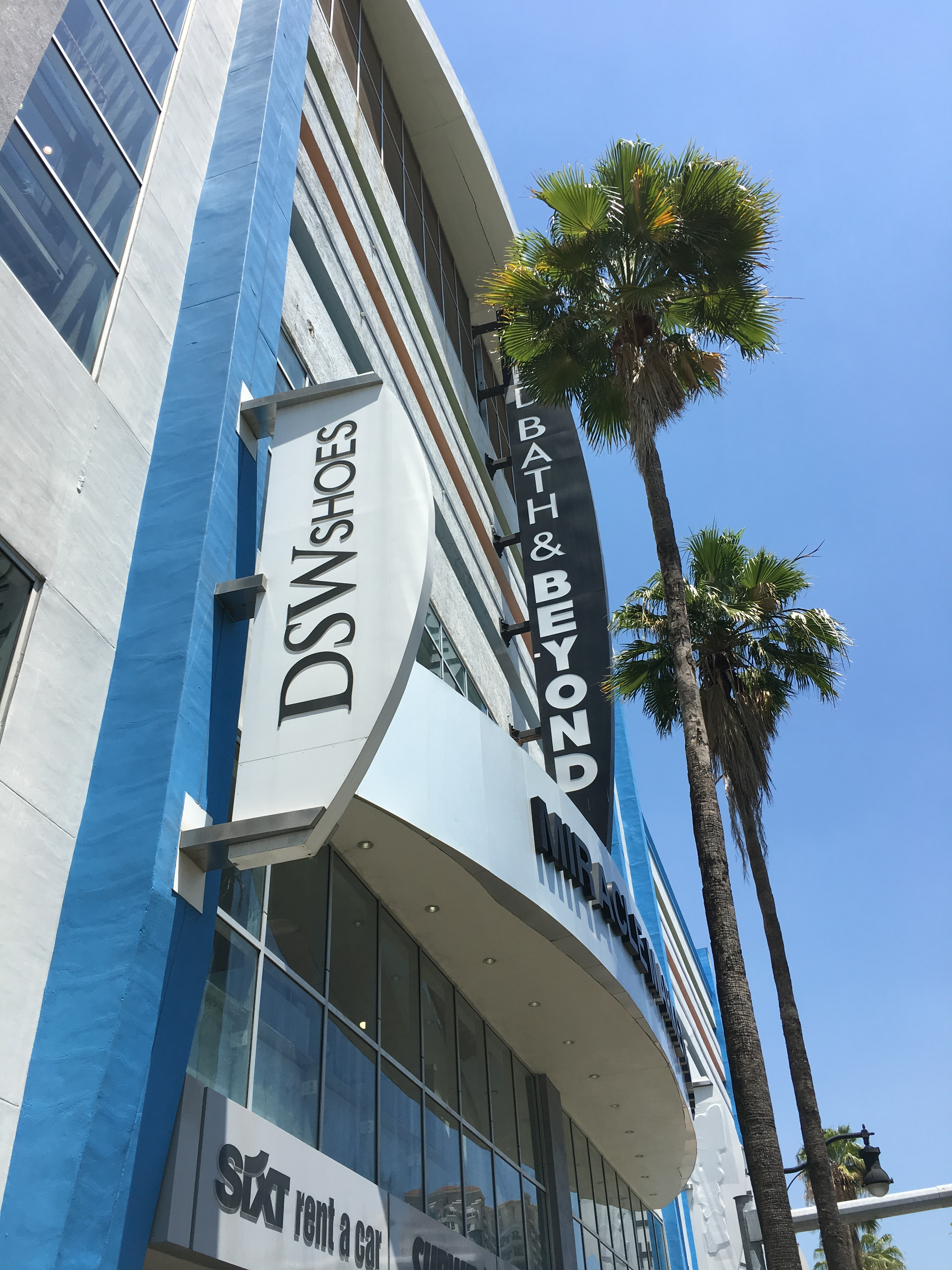
- Miracle Marketplace exterior, 2018
- Location: Miami, Florida, United States
- Coordinates: 25.7504°N 80.2497°W
- Address: 3301 Coral Way
- Opened: 1989
- Architect: Architectonica International, redesigned by Beame Architectural Partnership in 2003 for opening in 2009
- Floor area: 260,000 square feet (24,000 m^{2})
- Floors: 3

Miracle Marketplace is a shopping mall in Miami, Florida, United States, which opened in March 1989. It is located at 3301 Coral Way (S.W. 22 Street), just a few blocks east of Douglas Road (S.W. 37 Avenue), east of Coral Gables.

== History ==
In 1989, the mall opened as Miracle Center. At the time, it included several chain retail tenants, a movie theatre owned by General Cinema Corporation, and three chain restaurants: Chili's; TGI Friday's; and Fuddruckers. It was designed by Architectonica International in a 1980s Post-Modern style. It had large trapezoidal "clouds" affixed to the façade, but they were removed by new owners when the building was renovated in the mid-2000s.

By 1996, most of the mall's inline tenants had closed due to lack of business. Its developers announced plans to reconstruct the first level as a marketplace with local vendors. At this point, the complex was renamed The Village at Paseos.

In 2000, after the Village at Paseos concept also failed to generate business, Swerdlow Group bought the mall and renovated it as an office space. The offices all closed after the end of the dot-com bubble. The only tenant that remained from the previous mall at the time was Bally Total Fitness.

In 2005, Talisman Companies bought the building and announced plans to rebuild it as a power center. Initial plans included DSW Shoe Warehouse, PetSmart, OfficeMax, and Ulta as possible tenants.

In 2009, the three-story, 260,000-square-foot (6.0-acre; 24,000 m^{2}; 2.4 ha) mall reopened as Miracle Marketplace. Among its tenants were Marshalls, Michaels, Nordstrom Rack, PetSmart, DSW Shoe Warehouse, and Bed Bath & Beyond.
