= Ines Silva =

Venezuelan visual artist (born 1970)

Ines Silva (also written Inés Silva; born 12 January 1970, in Caracas, Venezuela) is a Venezuelan visual artist who works in geometric abstraction. She has lived in the United States since 2010.

== Biography ==
Silva studied architecture at the Central University of Venezuela, graduating with honors in 1992, and then turned to art. Since then her work has developed within constructivism and geometric abstraction.

Much of her work uses plexiglas as a support, on which she paints planes, stripes and lines in intense, translucent colors, so that each piece changes with the viewer's position.

In 2002 she received the Critics Award at the first Art Biennial of the Faculty of Architecture and Urbanism of the Central University of Venezuela.

== Career ==
Silva took part in the Salon Comparaisons and the Salon des Réalités Nouvelles in Paris, and has exhibited with the Madi group, the Expansionism group and Art Construit International.

Her solo exhibitions include Euritmia at Graphic Art Gallery, Caracas (2007); De Rerum Natura at the Francisco Narváez Museum of Contemporary Art, Porlamar (2009); Musik der Farben und Formen at Museum Haus Ludwig, Saarlouis (2012); JardInés Colgantes at Graphic Art Gallery, Caracas (2023); and Rhythms of Geometry at Durban Segnini Gallery, Miami (2026).

Since December 2015 she has been represented in France by Galerie Denise René.

In 2019 her work Jardín Colgante negro was included in Negative Space: Trajectories of Sculpture in the 20th and 21st Centuries at ZKM Center for Art and Media Karlsruhe, curated by Peter Weibel with Anett Holzheid and Daria Mille. That year she also took part in For Now at the Coral Gables Museum.

== Collections ==
Her work is held in collections including the Satoru Sato Art Museum in Tome, Japan; the Museum of Geometric and MADI Art in Dallas; and MAGI '900 in Pieve di Cento, Italy.
