= Coral Gables City Hall =

- U.S. National Register of Historic Places
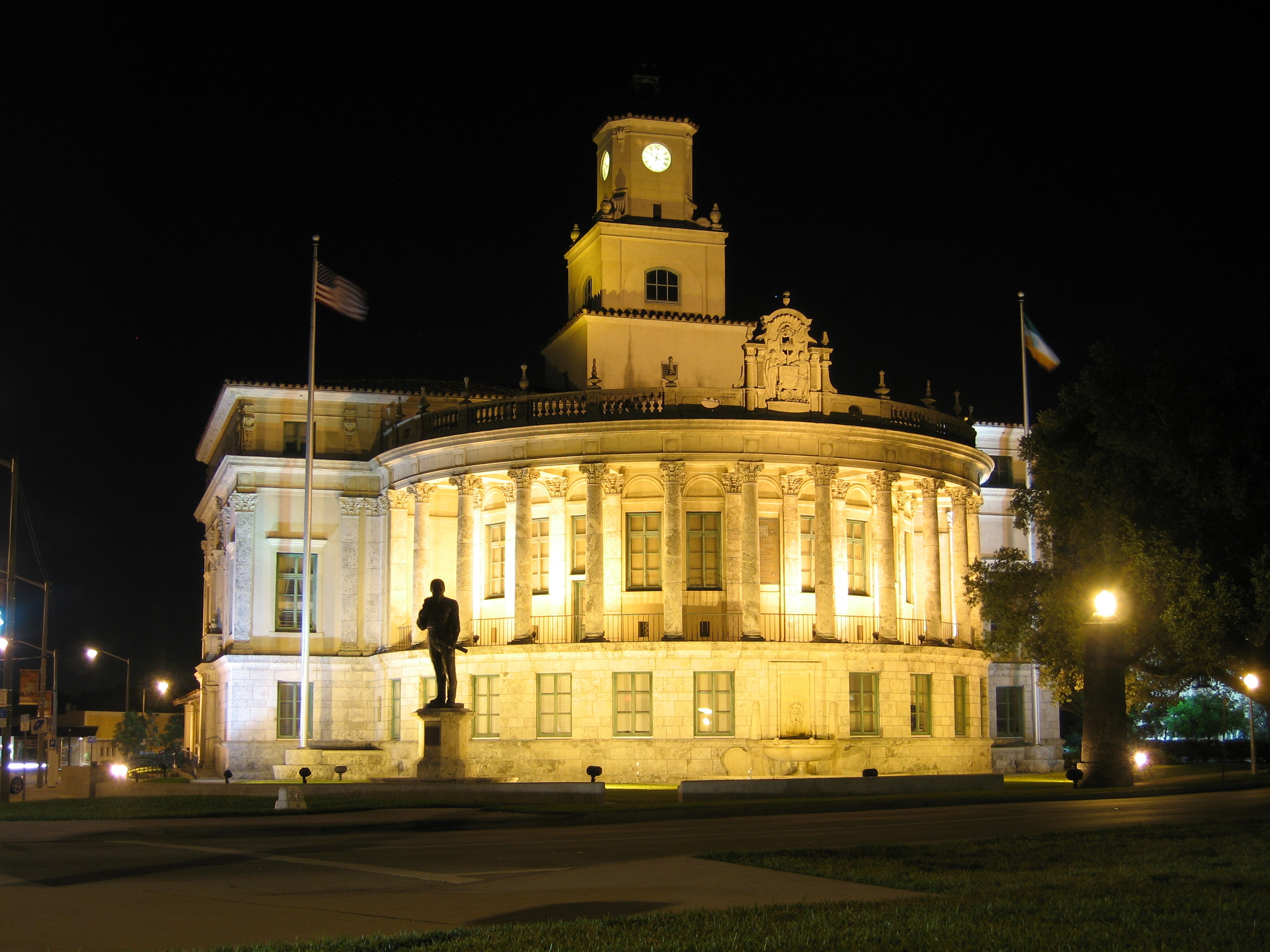
- Coral Gables City Hall at night, April 2008

- Location within Miami Location within Florida Location within the United States
- Location: Coral Gables, Florida
- Coordinates: 25°44′55″N 80°15′49″W
- Built: 1928
- Architect: Phineas Paist, Harold Steward
- Architectural style: Mediterranean Revival
- NRHP reference No.: 74000616
- Added to NRHP: July 24, 1974

The Coral Gables City Hall is a historic site in Coral Gables, Florida. It is located at 405 Biltmore Way. On July 24, 1974, it was added to the U.S. National Register of Historic Places.

The city hall was built in the Mediterranean Revival architectural style. It was completed in 1928. Phineas Paist and Harold Steward were the architects; Denman Fink was the artistic advisor. It is three stories tall, built of local limestone, has a stuccoed exterior, tile roof, central 3-stage clock tower, and a Corinthian colonnade. It was a major element in the plan of George E. Merrick, founder of Coral Gables, to create a Spanish-Mediterranean city.

== Sources ==
- Behar, Roberto M., ed. Coral Gables. Paris, France: Editions Norma, 1997. ISBN 2-909283-34-8
- Patricios, Nicholas N. Building Marvelous Miami. Gainesville, FL: University Press of Florida, 1994. ISBN 0-8130-1299-6.
- "Dade county listings at National Register".
