= David W. Dyer Federal Building and United States Courthouse =

- US Post Office and Courthouse
- U.S. National Register of Historic Places
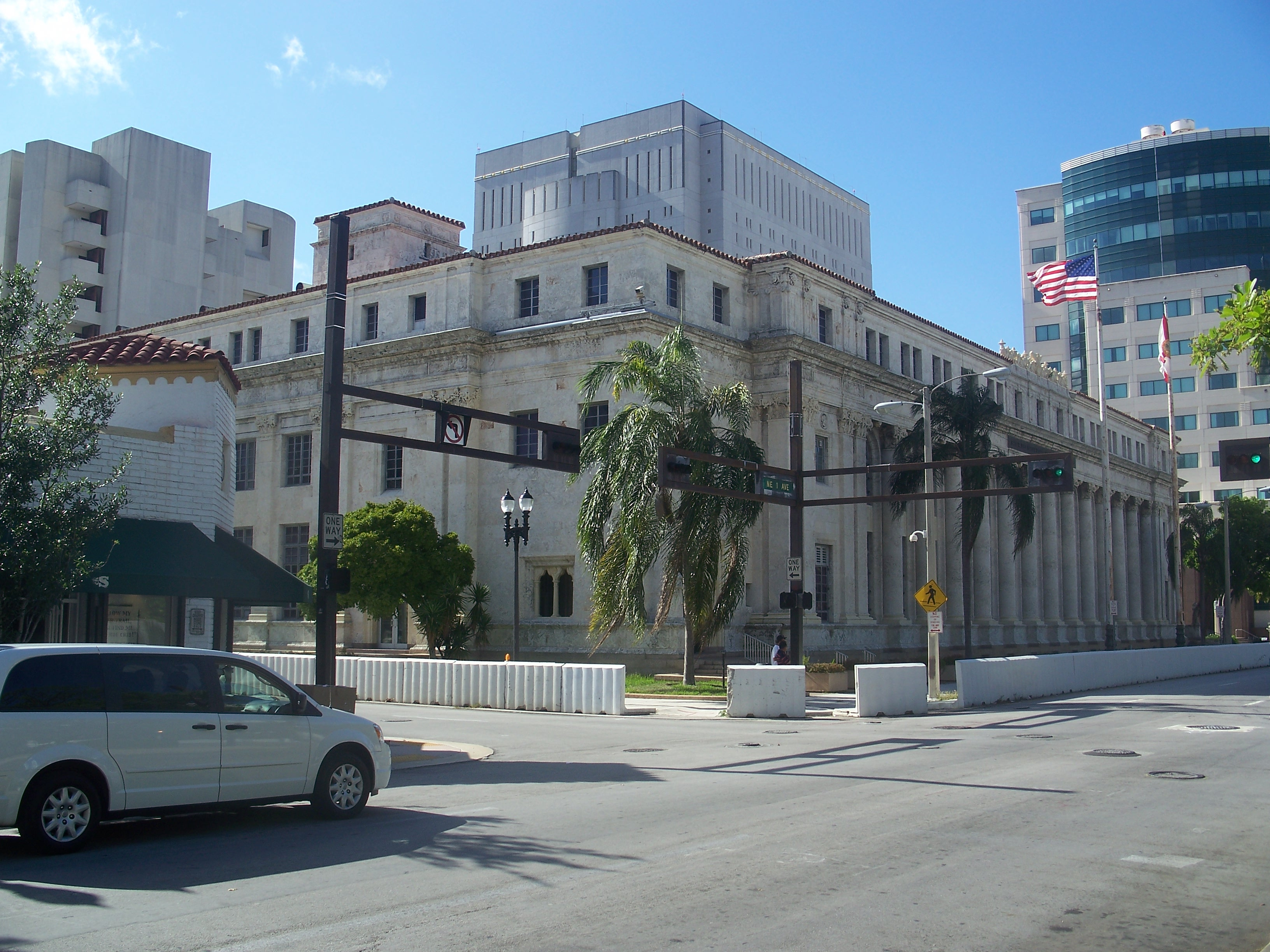

- Location within Miami Location within Florida Location within the United States
- Location: 300 Northeast First Ave., Miami, Florida
- Coordinates: 25°46′38″N 80°11′34″W
- Built: 1931
- Architect: Paist & Steward
- Architectural style: Mission/Spanish Revival
- NRHP reference No.: 83003518
- Added to NRHP: October 14, 1983

The David W. Dyer Federal Building and U.S. Courthouse, formerly known simply as the U.S. Post Office and Courthouse, is an historic United States Post Office and federal courthouse of the United States District Court for the Southern District of Florida located at 300 Northeast 1st Avenue in Miami, Florida. Built in 1931 of limestone, it is the largest such structure in South Florida.

The building was listed in the U.S. National Register of Historic Places in 1983. In 1997, it was renamed to honor David W. Dyer, a former Chief Judge of the Southern District who was appointed to the circuit court in 1966.

== Building history ==
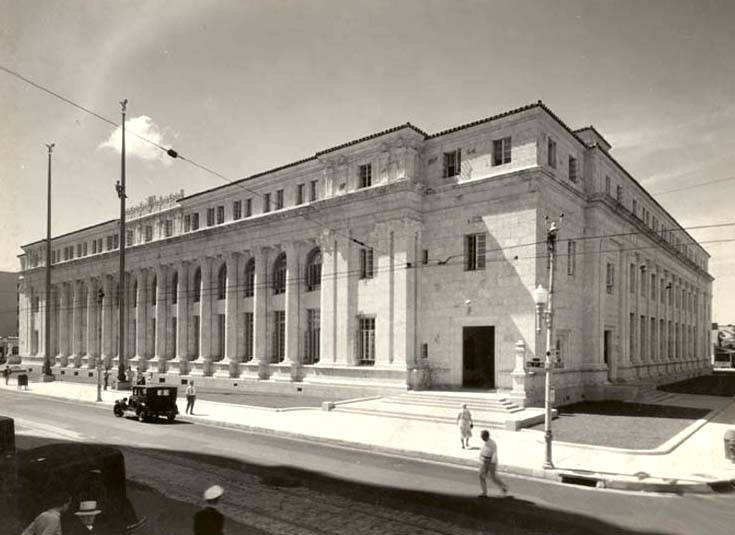
Courthouse in 1933

In 1887, railroad and real estate tycoon Henry Flagler hired the renowned New York architectural firm of Carrere & Hastings to design the Ponce de Leon Hotel in St. Augustine, Florida. The hotel's Mediterranean Revival design was so successful that it influenced numerous Florida architects and became the principal aesthetic in the Miami area from the mid-1910s into the 1930s.

In 1926, a devastating hurricane decimated southern Florida, prompting Congress to appropriate more than $2 million for a new courthouse in Miami in 1928. The Office of the Supervising Architect of the Treasury selected the highly regarded architectural partnership of Phineas Paist and Harold D. Steward. In the 1920s, Paist had been one of primary architects for developer George E. Merrick, for the Miami suburb of Coral Gables. Designing the building between 1930 and 1931, Paist and Steward blended classically inspired Renaissance Revival forms and design elements with Mediterranean ornamentation.

Paist and Steward developed two sets of plans, each to be built upon a poured concrete and steel structural frame, ensuring the new federal building would resist hurricane-force winds. The first envisioned using imported marble and bronze, while the second was to use aluminum and a local coralline limestone, a lithified coral quarried at Windley Key near Key Largo and called Keystone. The government opted to clad the building in Keystone, reasoning that local materials added to the regional appeal of the building. Construction commenced in 1931 and the opening ceremony was held on July 1, 1933. It remains the most monumental Keystone structure in South Florida.

When it opened, the building housed all Miami-area federal agencies with the exception of the Weather Service. The U.S. Postal Service vacated the building in 1976. It was occupied by federal courts and various federal agencies until 2008. It is contained within Federal Courthouse Square, a two-block area that includes two other courthouses. On May 12, 2016, neighboring Miami Dade College signed a $1 a year, 115-year lease of the building for use as class rooms and lecture halls.

== Architecture ==
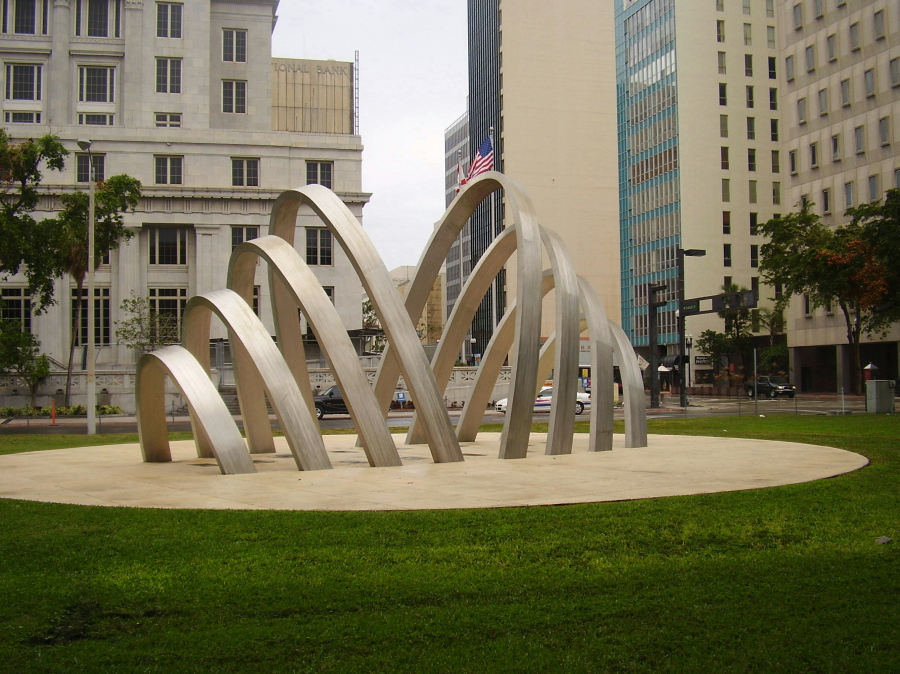
Sculpture in front of the courthouse

The building is an example of Mediterranean Revival architecture that combines Renaissance Revival elements with regional Florida architectural features. The building, which is faced in Keystone, is three stories in height, with the third story set above a widely projecting entablature on the north, east, and south elevations.

The facade, which has a slightly projecting central bay, faces east onto First Avenue and is dominated by a colonnade composed of regularly spaced engaged Corinthian columns supporting the classical entablature crowning the second story. Cast-aluminum casement window frames have embossed repeating chevron patterns. Spandrel panels depicting scenes from Florida's history are above the second story's arched windows.

The bays adjoining the colonnade feature paired Corinthian pilasters. Bas relief medallions containing classical figures in profile decorate lintels. The central parapet features a carved marble frieze incorporating a large eagle, flanked by a repeating motif of pelicans supporting heraldic shields. The entrances at the ends of the facade have surrounds of carved Floridene buff marble. The north and south elevations feature two-story Corinthian pilasters evoking the facade's colonnade. Ornate mascarons (carved faces) are found on the building's exterior.

The north and south elevations are dominated by central pavilions with bays separated by evenly spaced two-story engaged columns, placed singly and in pairs. An annex is attached to the west elevation. The building's shallow hipped roof is covered with terra-cotta tiles, typical of the Mediterranean Revival style.

Interior spaces are equally elaborate and incorporate eleven different types of marble. Entry vestibules with arched openings lead to the main lobby, where marble covers floors and forms wainscot. Marble pilasters have striking gilt capitals. An inset, multi-colored marble star pattern adorns the center of the floor. Original aluminum and glass chandeliers hang from the painted and gilt wood-and-plaster coffered ceiling. Marble postal tables retain original lamps and inset cast-brass grilles.

The double-height ceremonial District Courtroom is another significant space with well-preserved original details, including the carved wooden judge's bench, jury box, witness stand, and clerk's desk. Decorative details include fluted pilasters, rosettes, and carved plaques with floral rinceaux. At the walls, seven feet of paneled wood wainscot is located beneath scored plaster. Marble Ionic pilasters divide the window openings.

The mural Law Guides Florida Progress completed by artist Denman Fink in 1941 is located above the judge's bench and is flanked by two pairs of Ionic marble pilasters. The mural depicts the positive impact of justice guiding Florida's economic development. Fink included a likeness of himself as a draftsman and a likeness of architect Phineas E. Paist, with whom he worked in Coral Gables, as a chemist. The coffered ceiling features rosettes, stars, and shells.

Other significant artwork in the courthouse includes two striking cast-stone lunettes by Yugoslav-born American artist Alexander Sambugnac. Executed in 1938, the low-relief panels portray two allegorical figures representing themes of the spirit of justice and are placed on the lintels above the leather-covered doors. Love and Hope shows a young woman playing the lyre, while Wisdom and Courage depicts a seated figure gazing at a tablet of the law.

The interior brick courtyard admits light into the building while also providing a beautiful outdoor space commonly found in Florida architecture. A two-story loggia with a vaulted ceiling and columns surrounds the courtyard on three sides. Keystone pilasters support arched lunette windows above the public lobby's paired French doors. Quoins (corner blocks) and Doric columns add decorative elements to the space. The courtyard's interior walls are unplastered brick, as are the exterior walls that face toward the courtyard from the north, east and south wings. The loggia's plaster walls and ceiling are ornamented with the multi-colored Frescoes in Courtyard, added by artist David Novros in 1984. An original postal marble writing table with an elaborate pedestal occupies the west side of the courtyard.

== Significant events ==
- 1928 Congress appropriates money for new federal courthouse in Miami
- 1930-1931 Architects Paist and Steward design building
- 1931-1933 Building constructed
- 1940 Denman Fink's Law Guides Florida Progress mural completed
- 1983 Building listed in the National Register of Historic Places
- 1997 Building renamed to honor Judge David W. Dyer
- 2016 Miami Dade College signs 115-year lease of the building.

== Building facts ==
- Location: 300 Northeast First Avenue
- Architects: Phineas E. Paist and Harold D. Steward
- Construction Dates: 1931–1933
- Architectural Style: Mediterranean Revival
- Landmark Status: Listed in the National Register of Historic Places
- Primary Material: Keystone
- Prominent Features: Elaborate Classical Facade; Interior Courtyard and Galleries; Ceremonial Courtroom

== See also ==
- List of United States post offices
