= Coral Gables Police and Fire Station =

Coral Gables Museum
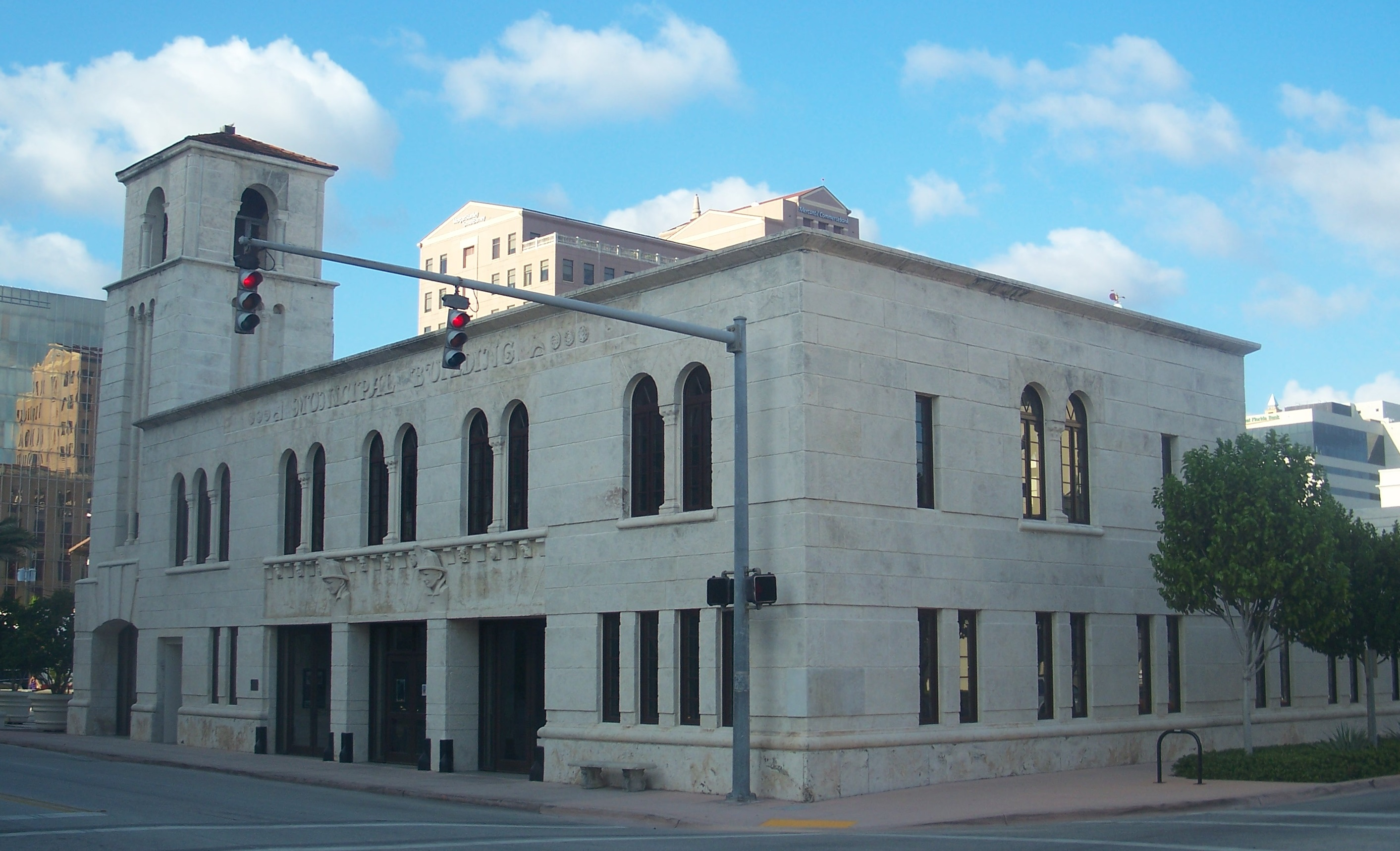
- Coral Gables Police and Fire Station in Coral Gables, Florida, April 2011
- Former name: City of Coral Gables Public Safety Building
- Established: October 2011
- Location: Coral Gables, Florida
- Type: Local history museum
- Founder: Wayne "Chip" Withers
- Director: Christine Rupp
- Chairperson: Arva Moore Parks
- Public transit access: Metrobus Route 56 & 24
- Website: coralgablesmuseum.org
- Coral Gables Police and Fire Station
- U.S. National Register of Historic Places
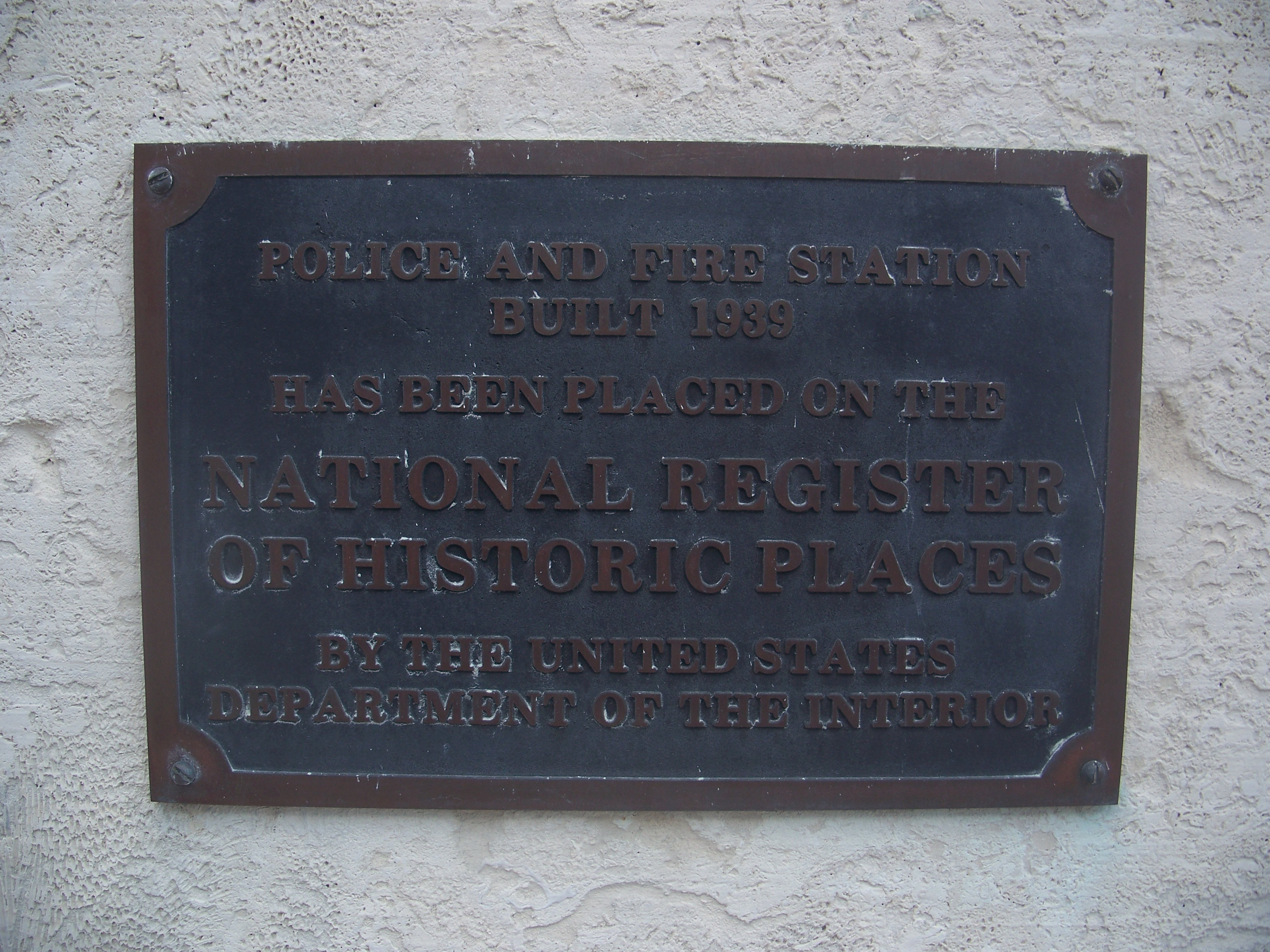

- Location within Florida
- Location: Coral Gables, Florida
- Coordinates: 25°45′1.95″N 80°15′38.16″W
- Built: 1939
- Architect: Phineas Paist
- Architectural style: Mediterranean Revival
- NRHP reference No.: 84000354
- Added to NRHP: November 6, 1984

The Coral Gables Police and Fire Station (also known as the City of Coral Gables Public Safety Building) is a historic site in Coral Gables, Florida. Completed in 1939 as a Works Progress Administration project, it was designed by Phineas Paist. In 2003, steps were taken to preserve the building and its legacy and by 2011, it was reopened to the public as the Coral Gables Museum.

== History ==
=== Police and fire station ===
Designed by Phineas Paist of the firm Paist and Steward, the building was built by the Works Progress Administration from 1938 to 1939 and includes a number of distinctive examples of Depression Modern sculpture. Paist was significant as the first registered architect in Miami and as the principal architect for the planned community of-Coral-Gables-. The structure is one of two W.P.A. municipal buildings in Coral Gables and survives in a relatively unaltered state.

Completed in 1939, the Old Coral Gables Police and Fire Station replaced a smaller interim facility located on the southwest corner of Salzedo and Alcazar. As a W.P.A. project, the City of Coral Gables provided the land and the Federal government the labor and 71.7% of the construction cost. The Police and Fire Station is of architectural distinction through its use of native keystone (oolitic or coral rock) in contrast to the concrete block construction of the Public Service Building. The architect of the building was responsible for some of the most distinguished buildings in Coral Gables, including the Douglas Entrance, City Hall, Christian Science Church and the Granada Plaza Fountains. For the exterior sculpture of the building, the W.P.A. commissioned Jon Keller (professional name, Theresa Keller maiden name). Keller was also responsible for works of Stephen Foster at the North Florida Memorial, a bust of John Gorrie (inventor of refrigeration) and two 13-foot statues at the Doral Beach Hotel on Miami Beach.

In 1975, the Police and Fire Departments vacated the building, although it has remained in the ownership of the City of Coral Gables.

=== Museum ===
In the mid-1990s Coral Gables Commissioner Wayne "Chip" Withers began conversations regarding the possibility of integrating a new museum into the City of Coral Gables. From initial living room chats with a group of artists, architects and cultural insiders, a dream began to take shape as Withers found that there was substantial interest in the idea. The Coral Gables Community Foundation volunteered as the fiscal agent for initial funds that were pledged for the museum. Eventually the city government as a whole became involved and a plan was formulated to house the museum in the historic 1939 Police and Fire Station. After the police and fire departments vacating the building and moving to their new location in the 1970s, the building was used for city offices that were to be re-located, and the beautiful old structure, deeply in need of restoration, seemed to be the perfect location for the cultural facility.

In 2003, the non-profit Coral Gables Museum Corp. was formed to direct and operate the museum in partnership with the City of Coral Gables. The City's Historical Resources Department applied for and received over $1.5 million in state and county grants to rehabilitate the building. In 2005, the Museum Corp. began to raise additional funds, and through the grant funding, the architectural firm of Jorge L. Hernandez was hired for the project. Eventually, the Museum Corp. determined that additional space would be necessary to make the museum a viable institution. The City agreed, and a new and separate 3,000 square feet (280 m^{2}) gallery space was designed, in addition to a beautiful 5000 square foot public plaza, both of which will be located in the surface parking lot currently behind the Old Police and Fire Station.

In 2007, the City of Coral Gables and the Coral Gables Museum Corp. executed an agreement whereby both the City and the Museum Corp. would be responsible for the restoration and rehabilitation of the original structure and the Museum Corp. would be responsible for funding the new construction; the Museum Corp. hired their first employee and the Community Foundation was relieved of their fiscal duties, and a Mission Statement was approved.

In 2008, the construction costs became fully funded and work began in earnest on the project. Dooley Mack Constructors managed the 1.5 year construction project working with a variety of specialized tradesmen and artisans to restore the beautiful 1939 building and construct the Fewell Wing. The topping off celebration was held in November 2009. The Certificate of Occupancy was issued in early 2011. The fully staffed Museum opened to the public in October 2011. Its diverse exhibit and program offerings focused on the civic arts continue to be well received by the South Florida community.

Elvis Fuentes, a Cuban-born curator who had previously worked at El Museo del Barrio in New York and the Institute of Puerto Rican Culture, became executive director in 2022. Under Fuentes, the museum expanded its exhibition of visual arts, while retaining its emphasis on architecture, urban design and the history of Coral Gables.
