= Venetian Pool =

- U.S. National Register of Historic Places
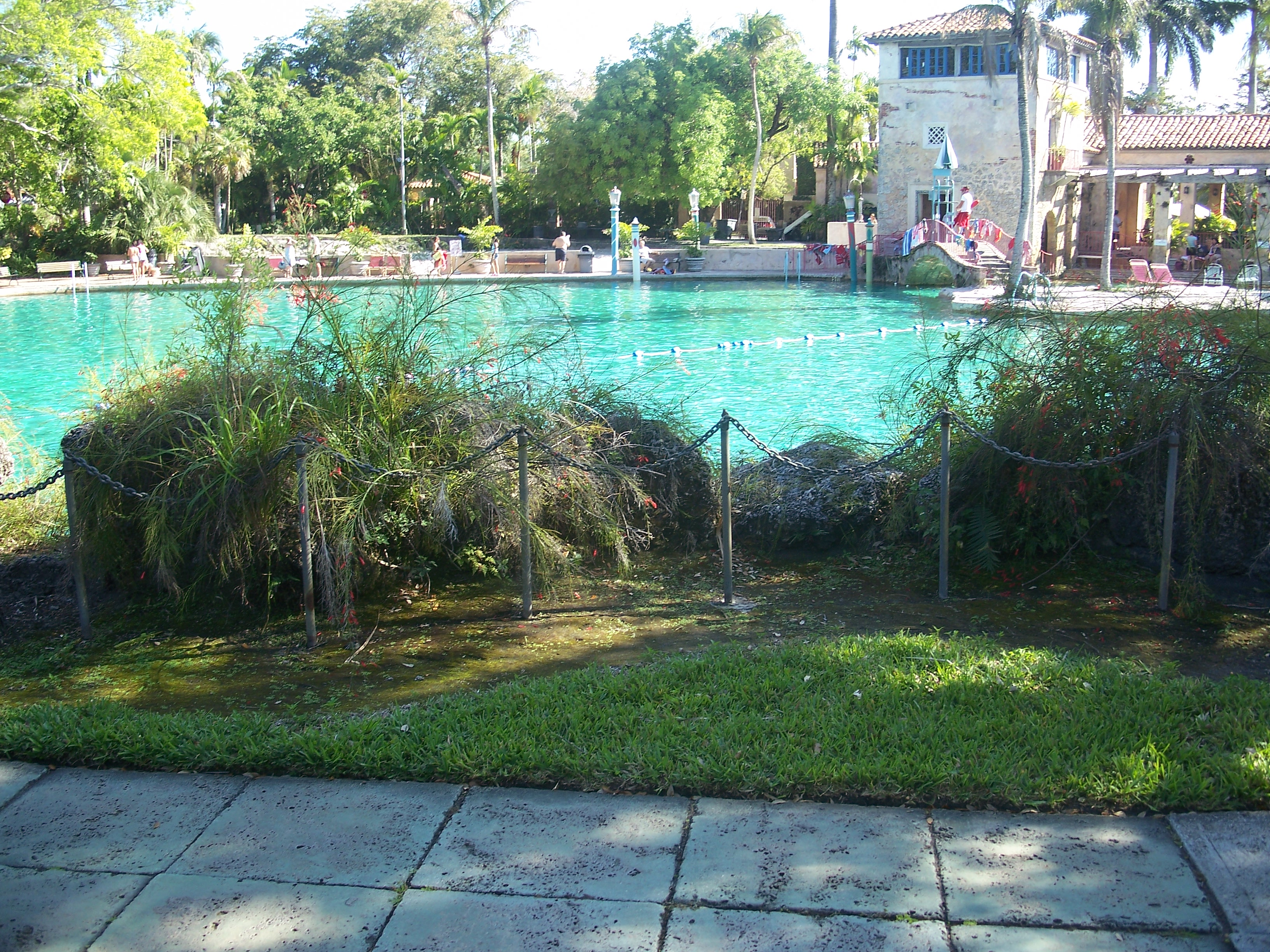
- Venetian Pool in Coral Gables, Florida, June 2016
- Location: Coral Gables, Florida, United States
- Coordinates: 25°44′46″N 80°16′27″W
- Area: 4 acres (16,000 m^{2})
- Built: 1924
- Architect: Phineas Paist
- NRHP reference No.: 81000193
- Added to NRHP: August 20, 1981

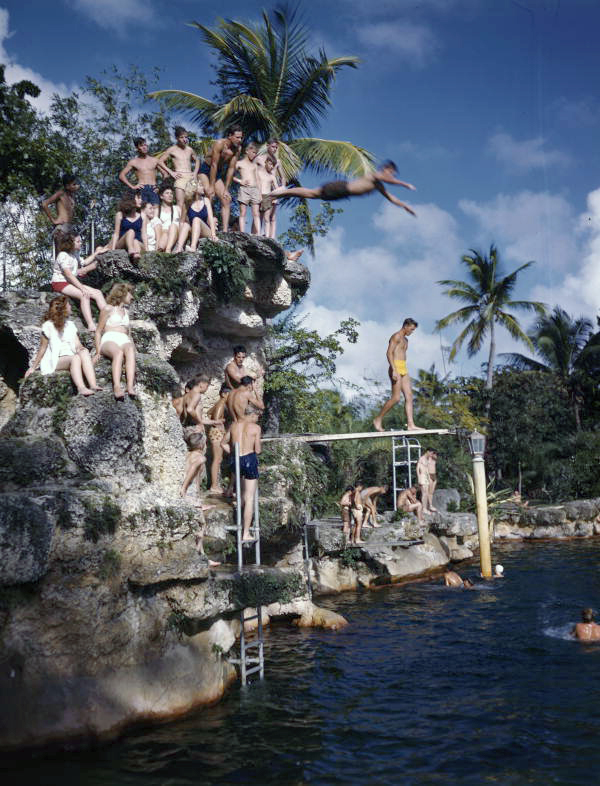
Kids diving off rock hill at the Venetian Pool tourist attraction in Coral Gables, Florida in the 1940s

Venetian Pool is a historic U.S. public swimming pool located in Coral Gables, Florida. Completed in 1924, it was designed by Phineas Paist with Denman Fink.

== History ==
Venetian Pool, opened in 1924 as "Venetian Casino," was created from a 4-acre (16,000 m^{2}) old limestone quarry, abandoned in 1921. The pool was founded by George Merrick as part of the development of Coral Gables, which was created in Mediterranean Revival style and utilized a large amount of limestone for ornamental features of the community. The remaining quarry was reconfigured by architect Phineas Paist and designed by artist Denman Fink. Named for the Mediterranean city of Venice, Italy, the pool included a Venetian style bridge and classic mooring posts.

Venetian Pool has gone through several phases. A large additional island was created to allow Venetian-style gondolas to dock alongside, though the gondolas were later removed. A high diving platform was constructed above the grand waterfall and was also later torn down. Early in its history, the pool was regularly drained completely to permit the Miami Symphony to perform in it, taking advantage of the quarry's natural acoustic qualities. In 2001, to celebrate the 75th anniversary of Coral Gables, the pool was once again drained for an orchestral performance. A 1989 renovation restored many of the pool's original features.

In 1981, Venetian Pool was added to the National Register of Historic Places, and is the only pool listed on the register.

== Description ==
The pool occupies a shallow quarry displacing some 820,000 US gallons (3,100 m^{3}) of fresh water daily from artesian wells, making it the largest freshwater pool in the United States.

The pool ranges in depth from four feet to depths of over eight feet near the grand waterfall, with a two-foot kiddy pool near the lifeguard station; the station is atop a bridge leading out to an island with two full size palm trees on it. A grotto, where natural water-filled caves stretch back over twelve feet into the hillside, is located across the pool from the island. There is a sandy sunning area for sunbathers and a café area that is commonly used for weddings and receptions. A walking path surrounds the whole complex.

The pool received a massive historical restoration in 1989. The pool had another major renovation (and was closed to the public) between September 8, 2008 and April 30, 2009.

== Sustainability ==
The pool has come under criticism from environmentalists due to the massive amounts of fresh water it uses daily, raising concerns that the process of completely draining the pool every night and refilling it the following day was depleting the Floridian aquifers. In 1998 a solution was devised to drain the water back into the aquifer, using natural ground filtration, thus recycling the precious natural resource, while allowing the pool to maintain its fresh, clear water.

== Hours of operation ==
The Venetian Pools operate from Tuesday to Sunday from February to mid-March. Guests can attend the pool from 10 a.m to 4:30 p.m during these dates. The Venetian Pool's operation dates and times change frequently.

In the later spring, the pools hours of operation are from 11 a.m to 4:30 p.m Tuesday through Friday. On Saturday and Sunday, the Venetian Pool is open from 10 a.m to 4:30 p.m.

In the summer, the pool is open Monday through Friday from 11 a.m to 6:30 p.m and 10 a.m to 4:30 p.m on Saturdays and Sundays.

From labor day, the Venetian Pool is open Tuesday through Friday from 11 a.m to 5:30 p.m.

From the end of October to the end of to November, the Venetian Pool is open from 10 a.m to 4:30 p.m Tuesday through Sunday. The Venetian Pool is closed on certain holidays, which include: New Year’s Day, Martin Luther King Day, President’s Day, Thanksgiving Day, Day after Thanksgiving, Christmas Eve, and Christmas Day.

== Admission ==
Admission varies, depending on whether or not the guest is a Coral Gables resident. For residents 13 years and older, admissions prices are $6.50. Any children ranging from ages 3 to 13 have an admissions price of $5.50. Non-residential children must pay $16 and adults $21 for admission. At the venue, lawn chairs and life jackets are readily available.

== Gallery ==
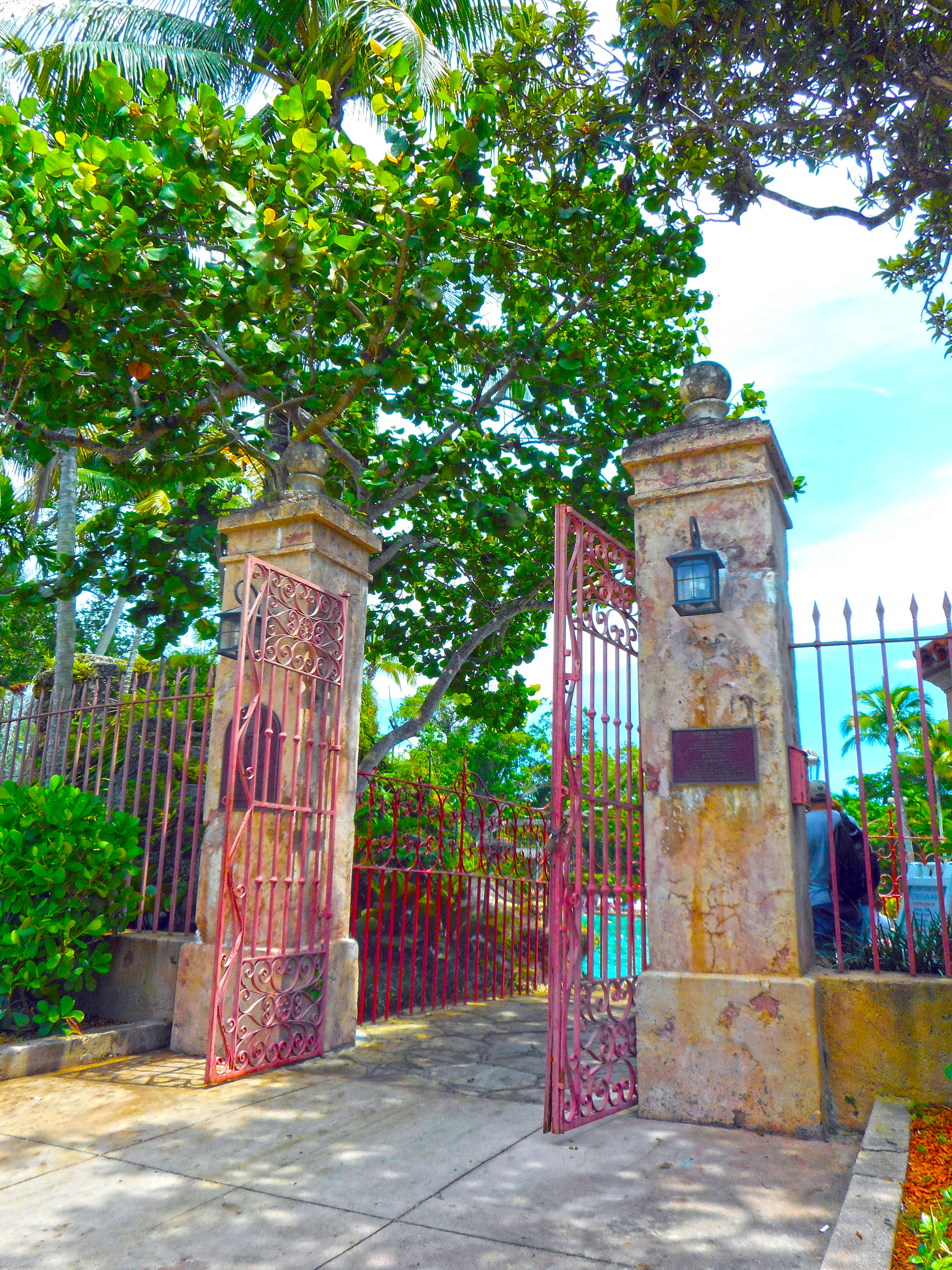
Entrance gate

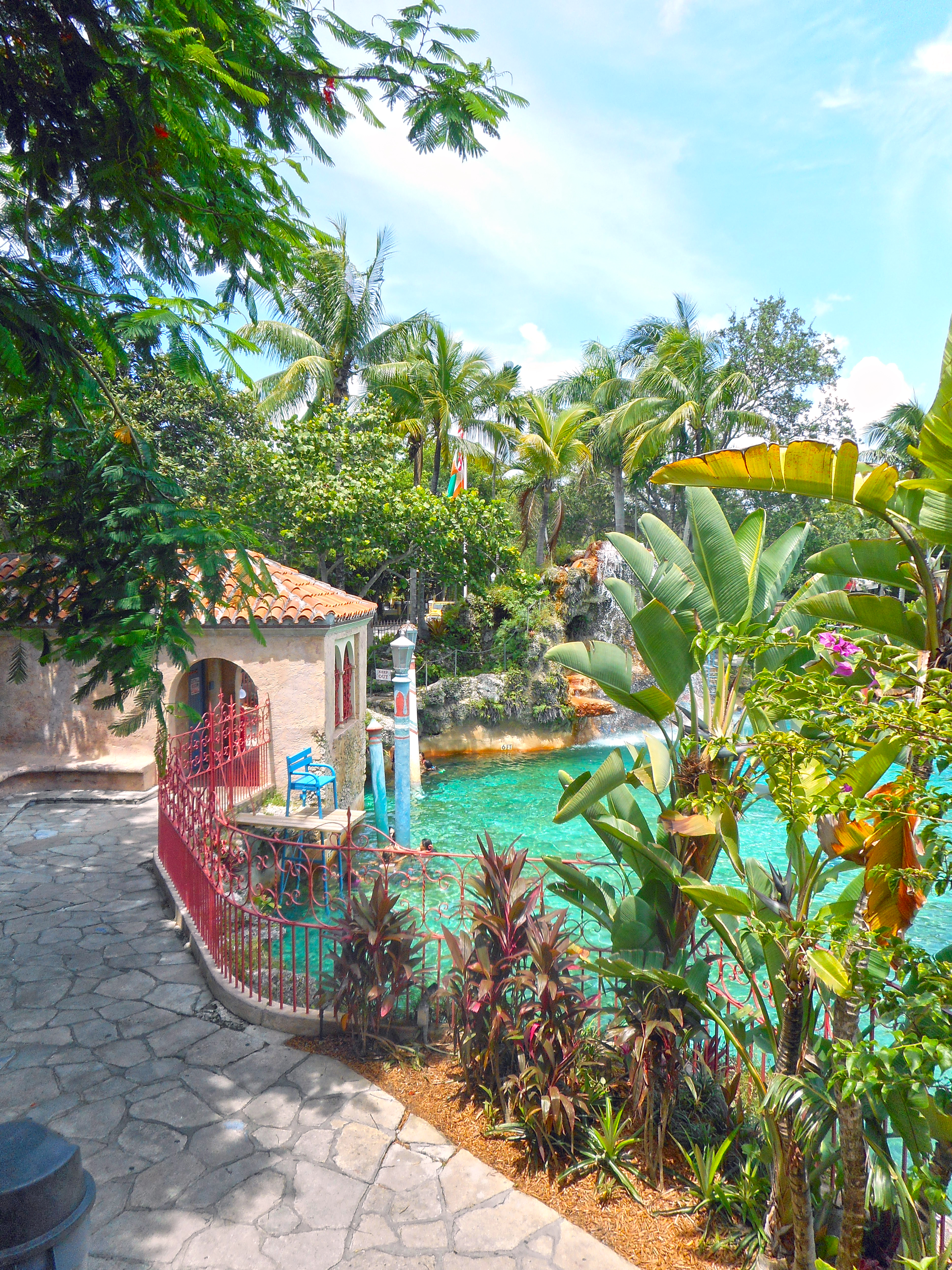
Entrance building with greenery

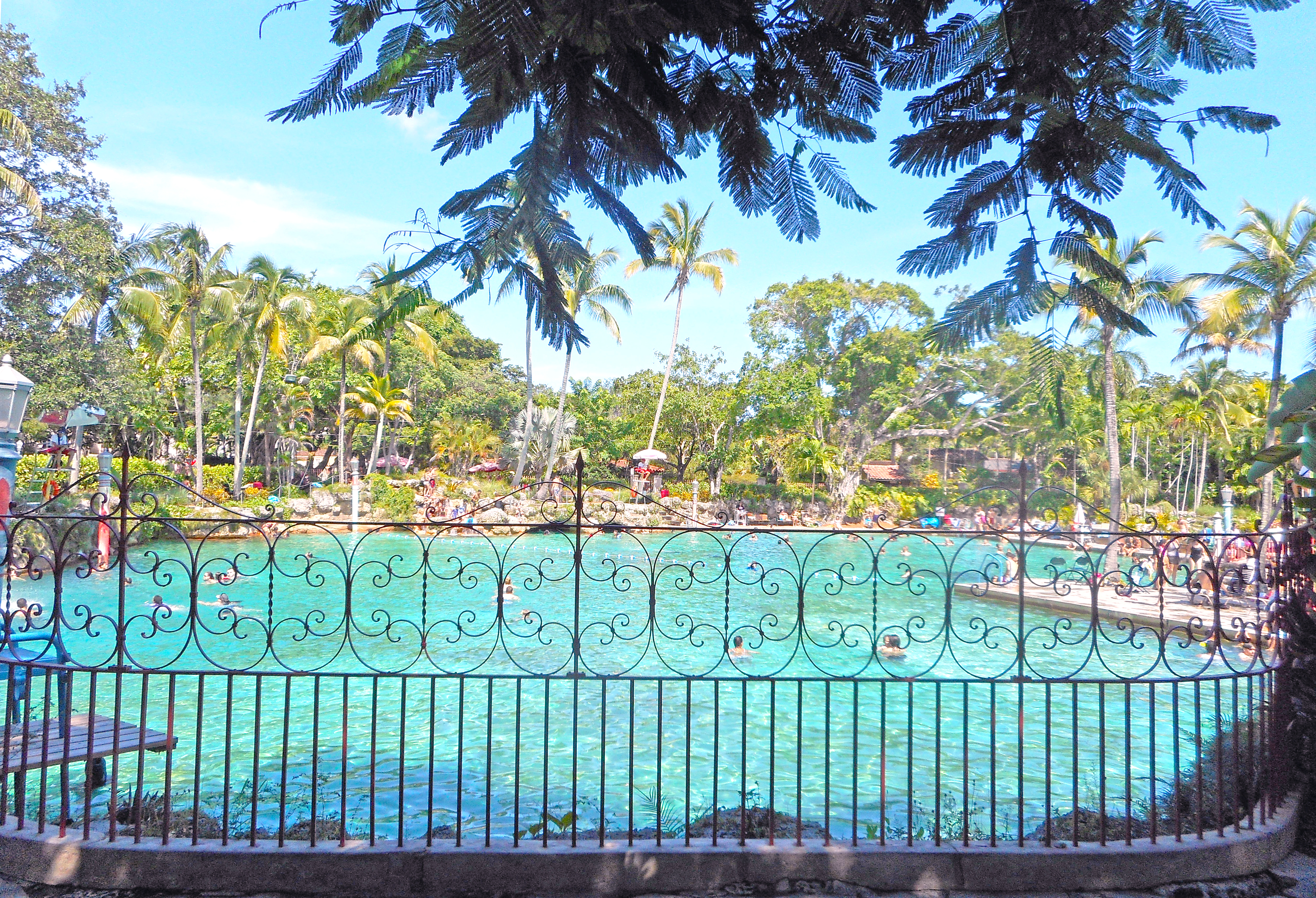
View of pool through railings

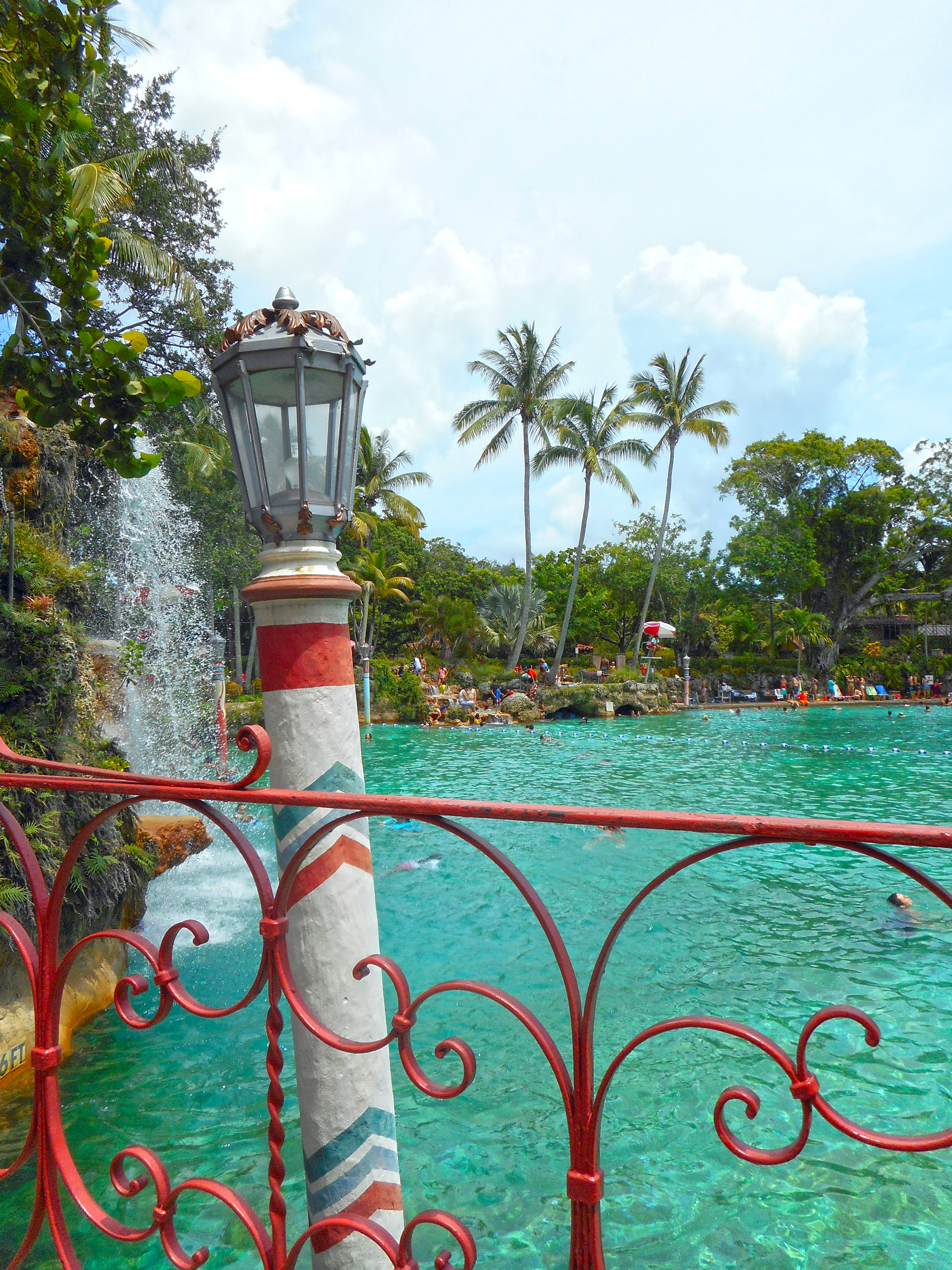
Mooring post and waterfall

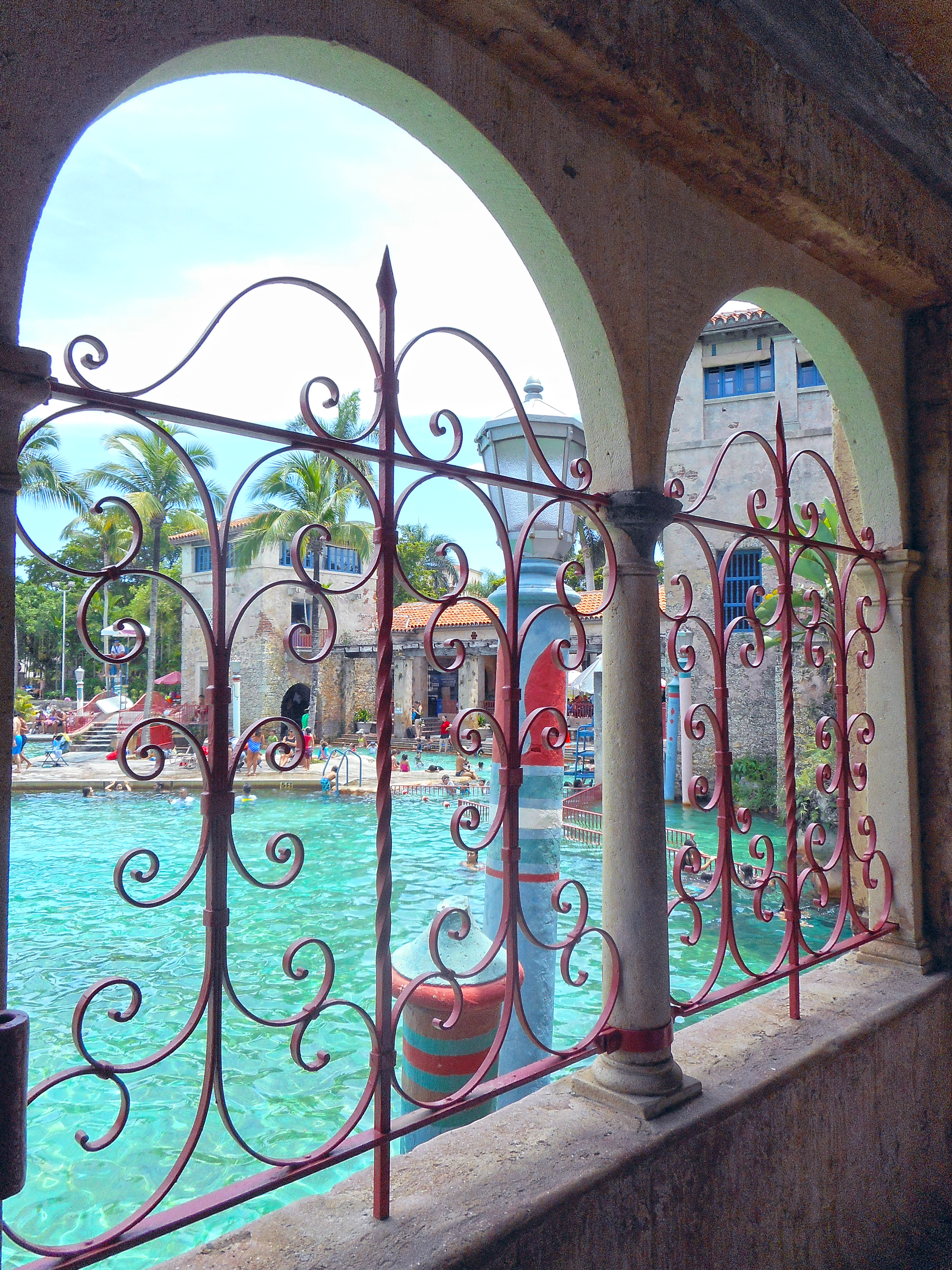
View of pool through entrance building

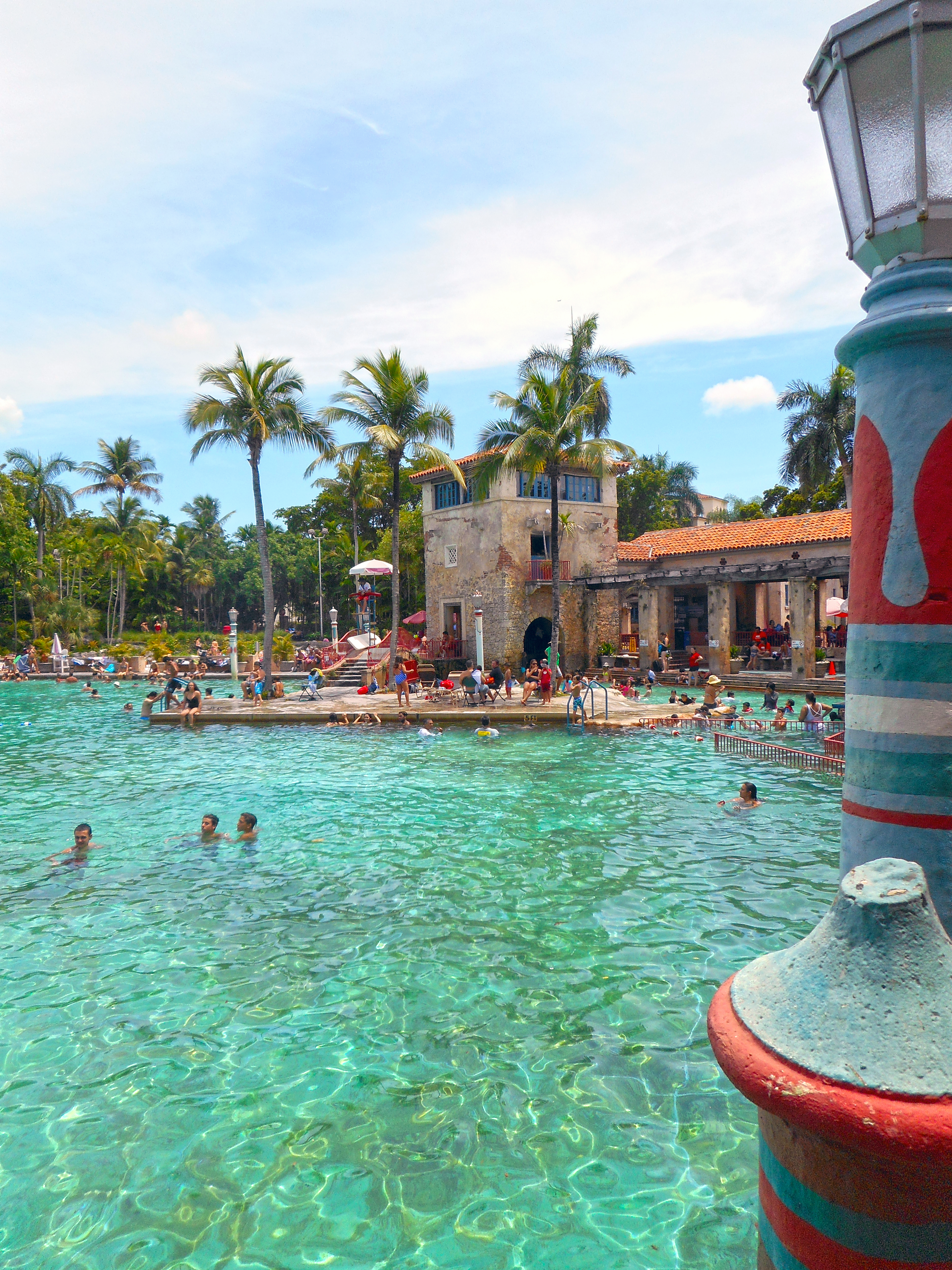
Mooring post, island and pool

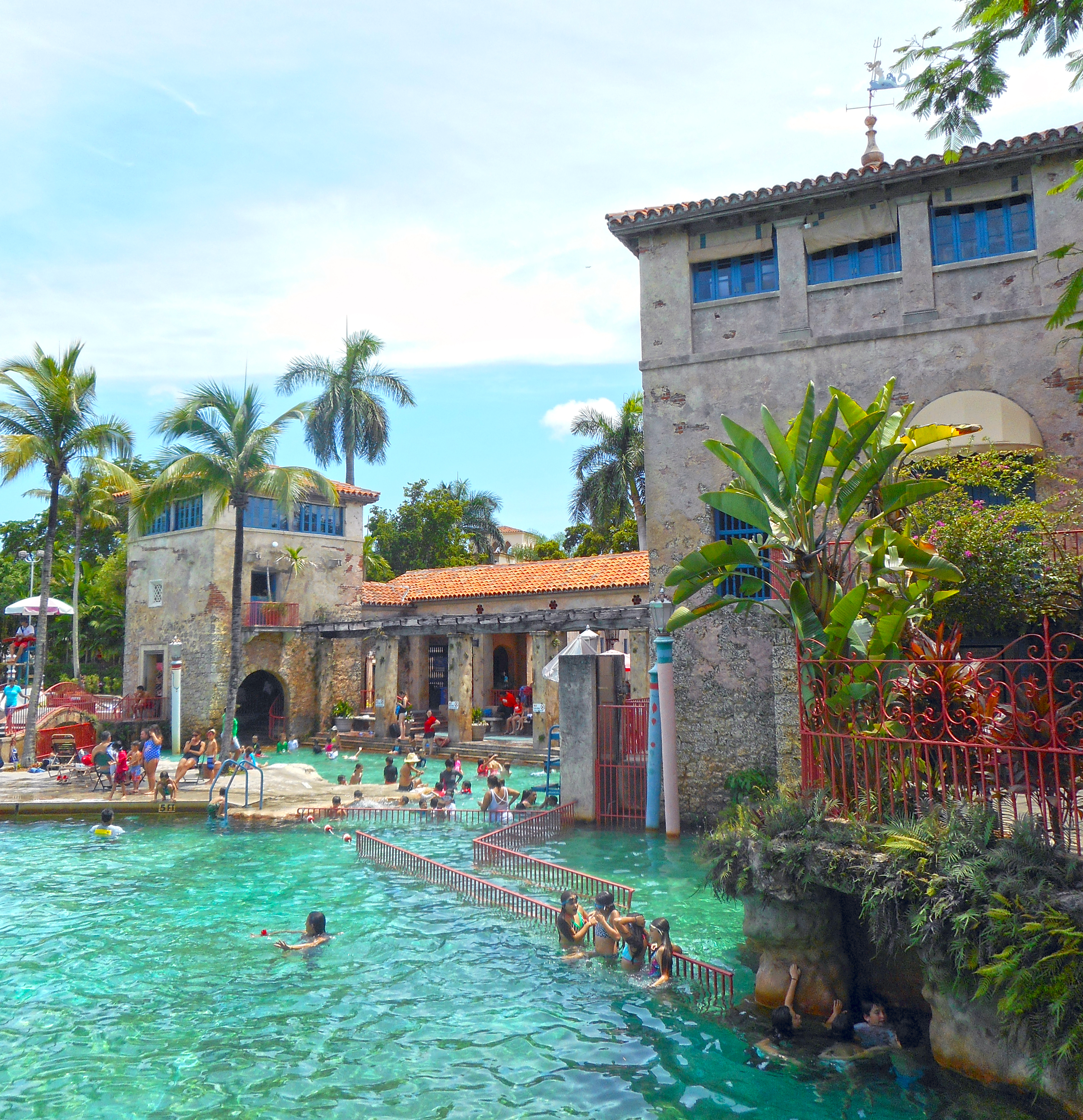
Main buildings with pool and island

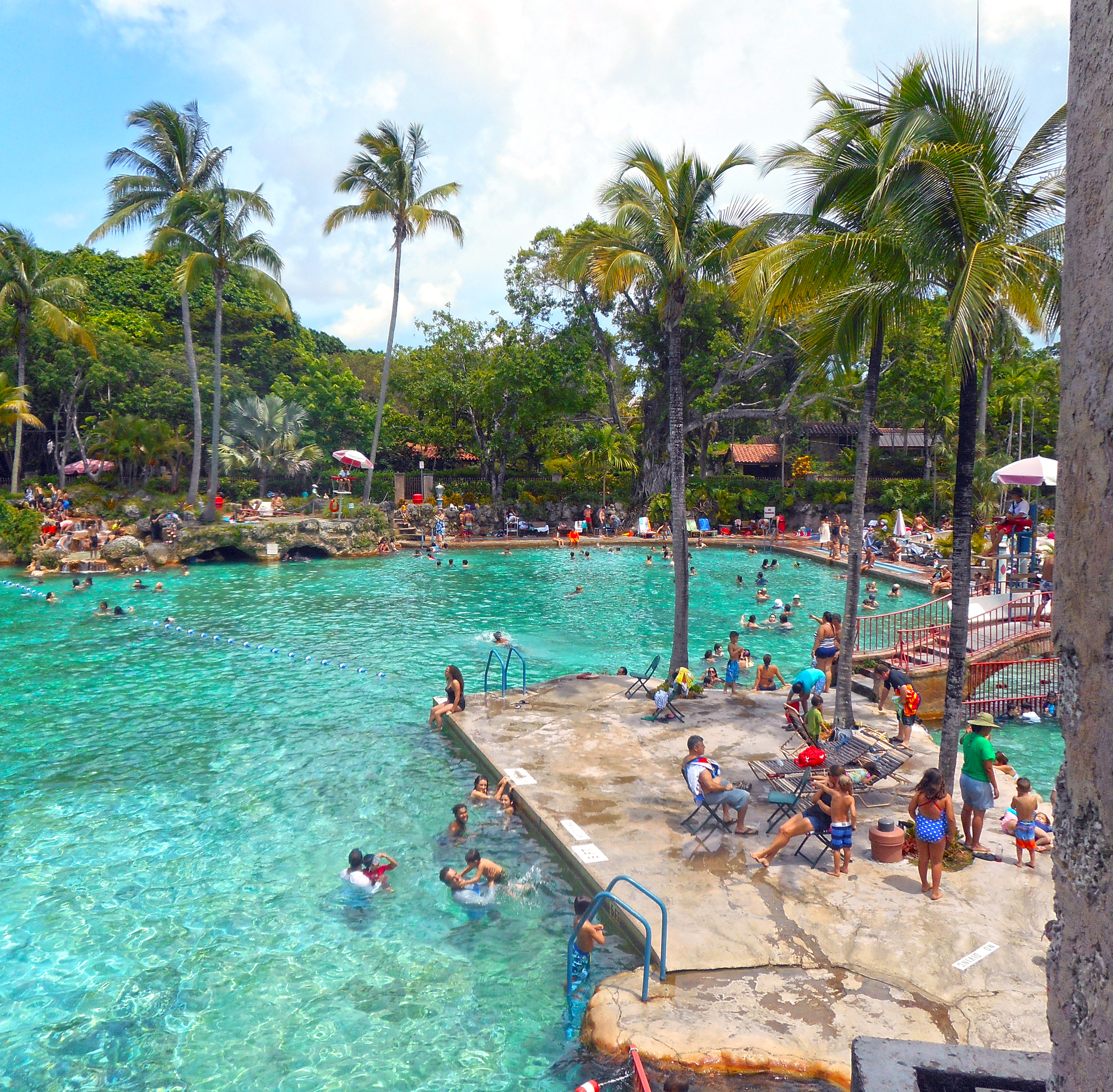
Island with bridge

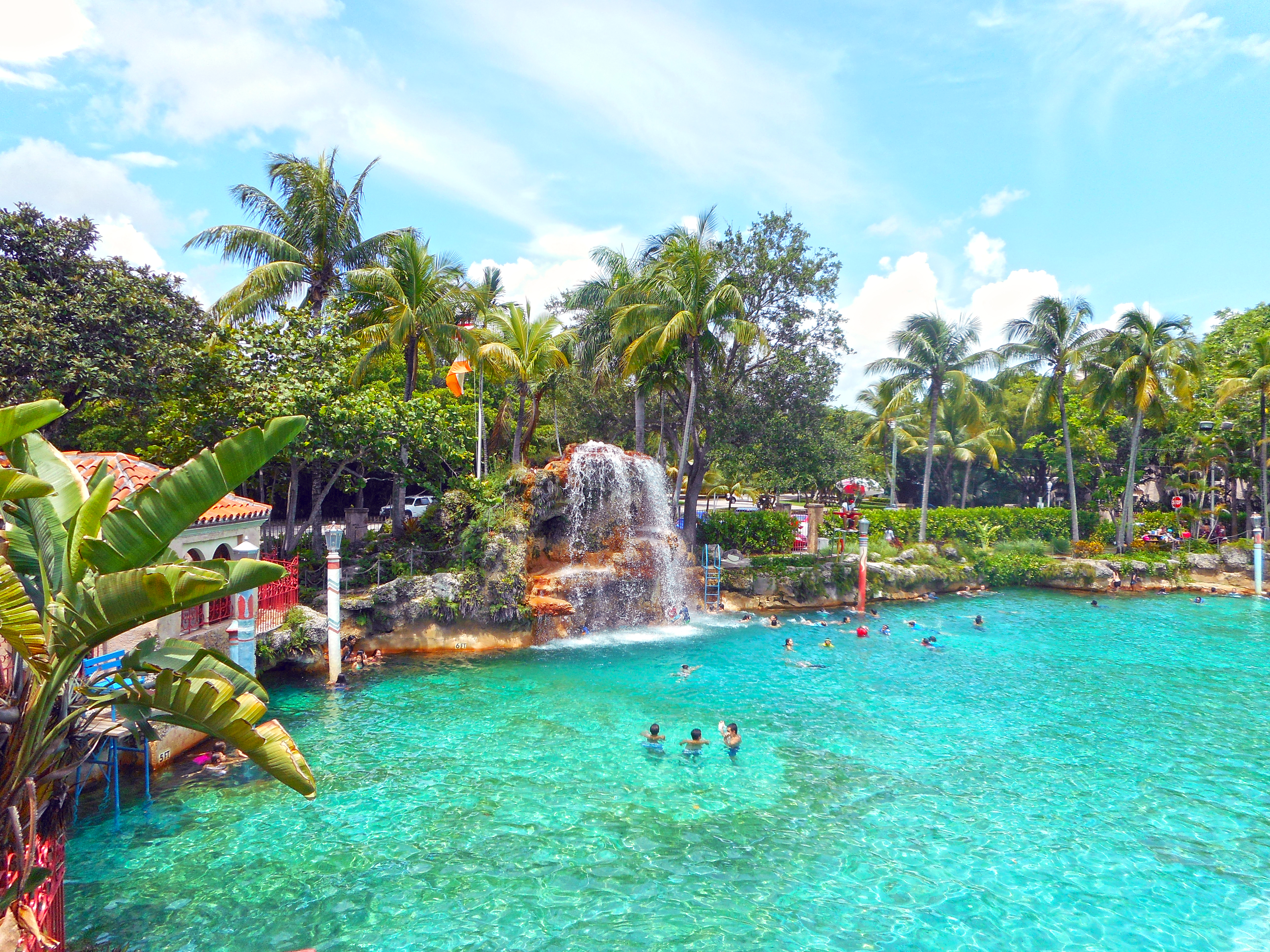
Waterfall and pool

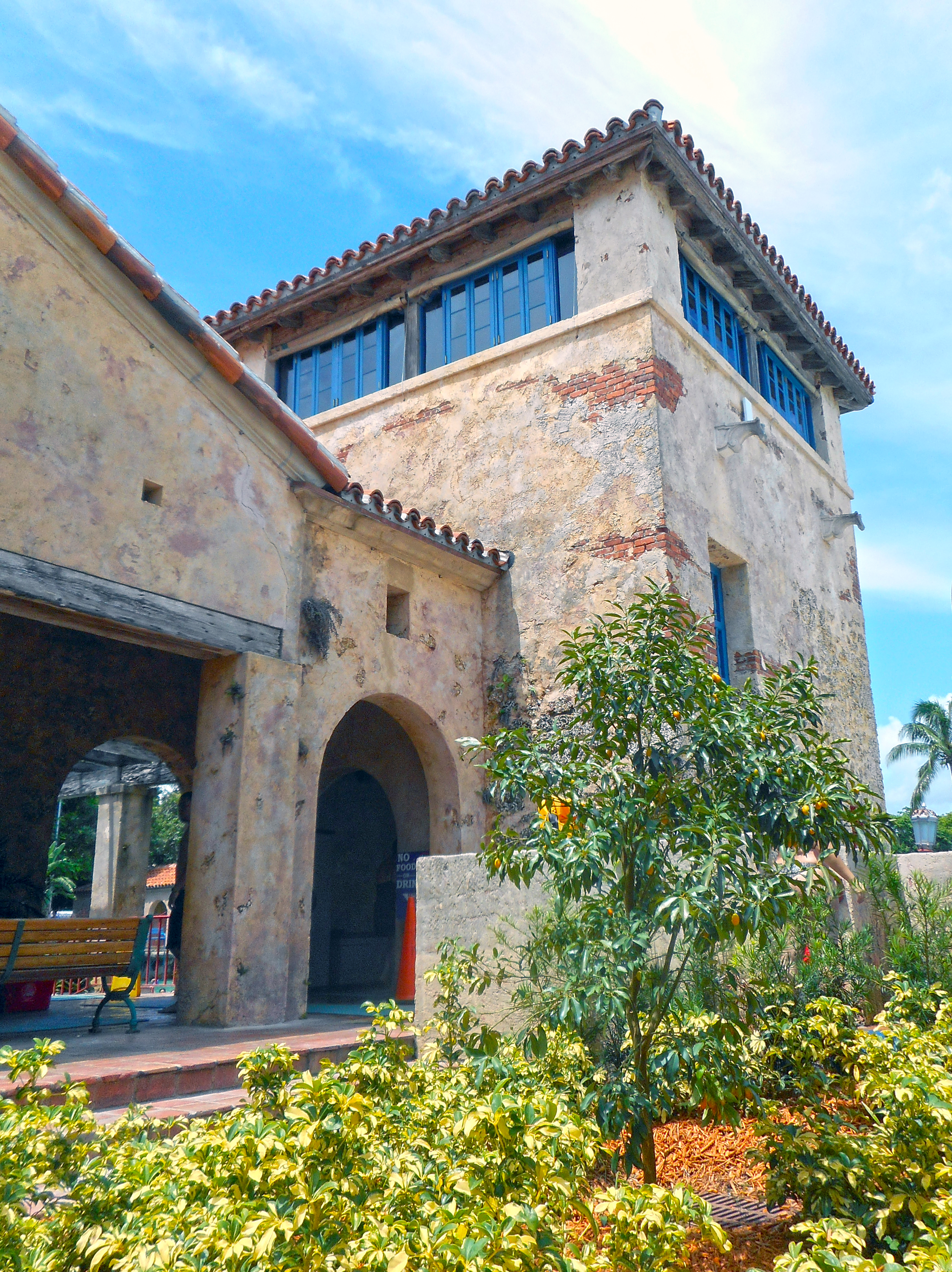
Main building and greenery

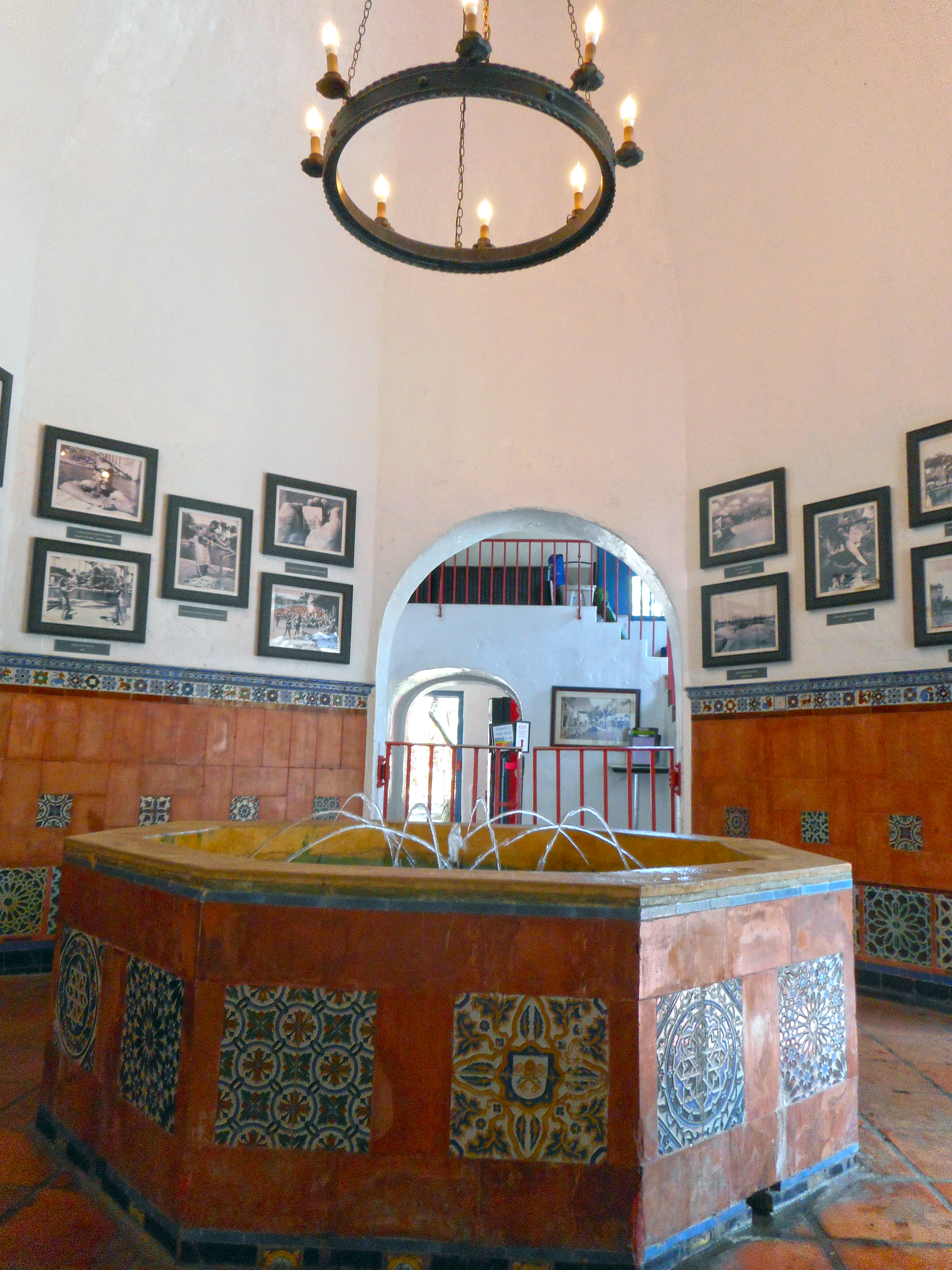
Fountain and hanging ceiling lamp

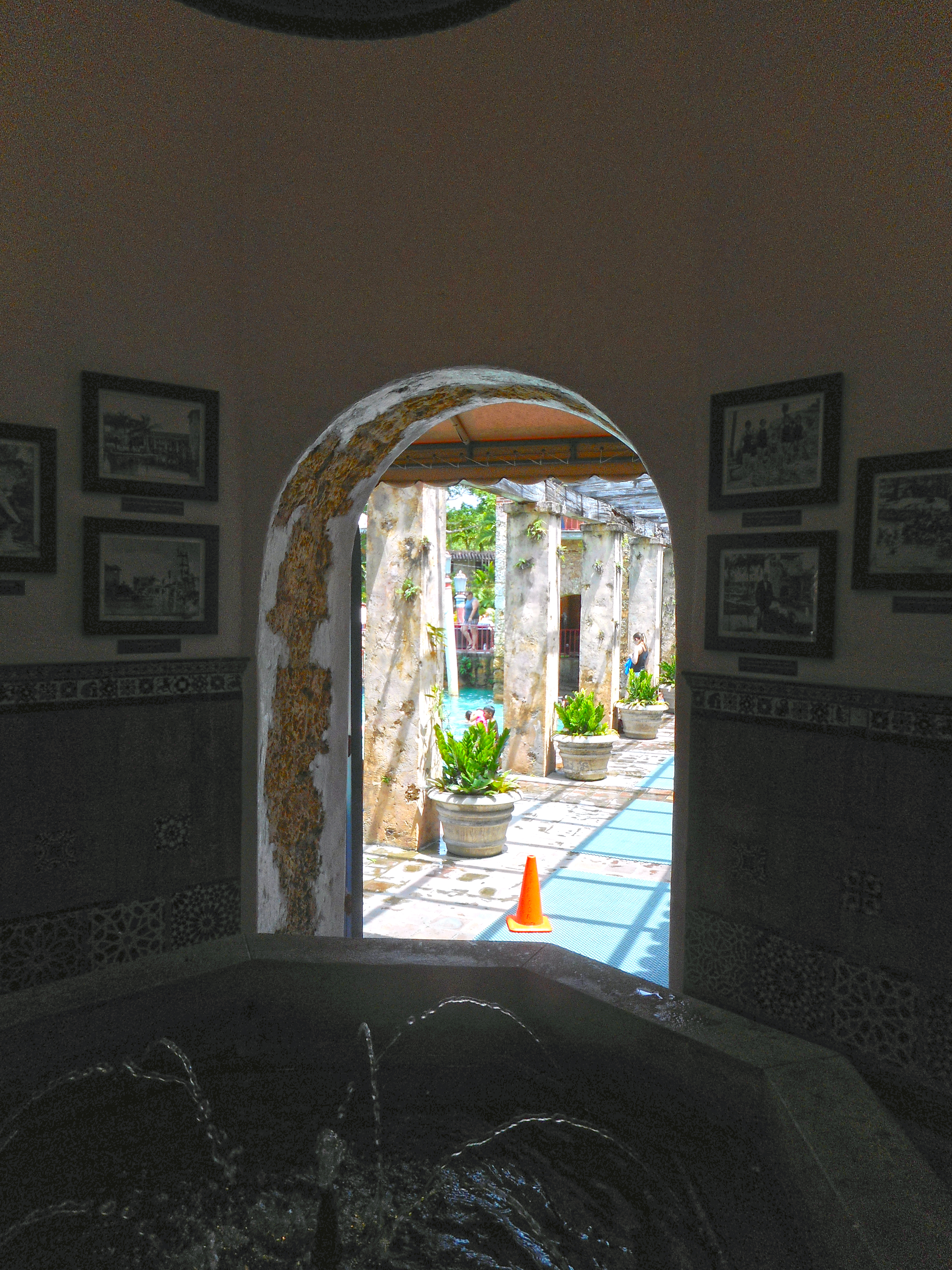
Fountain in main building

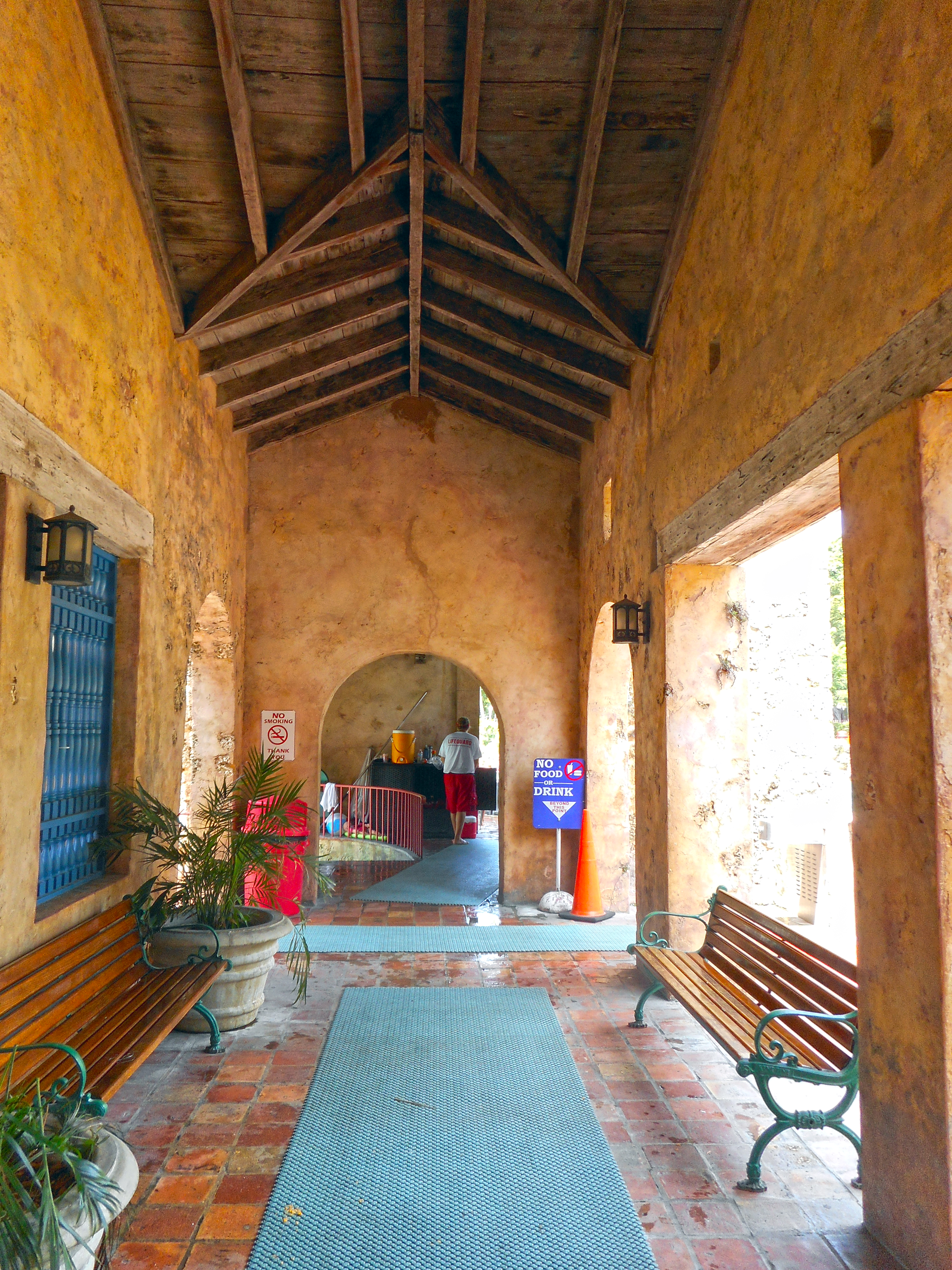
Interior gallery of main building

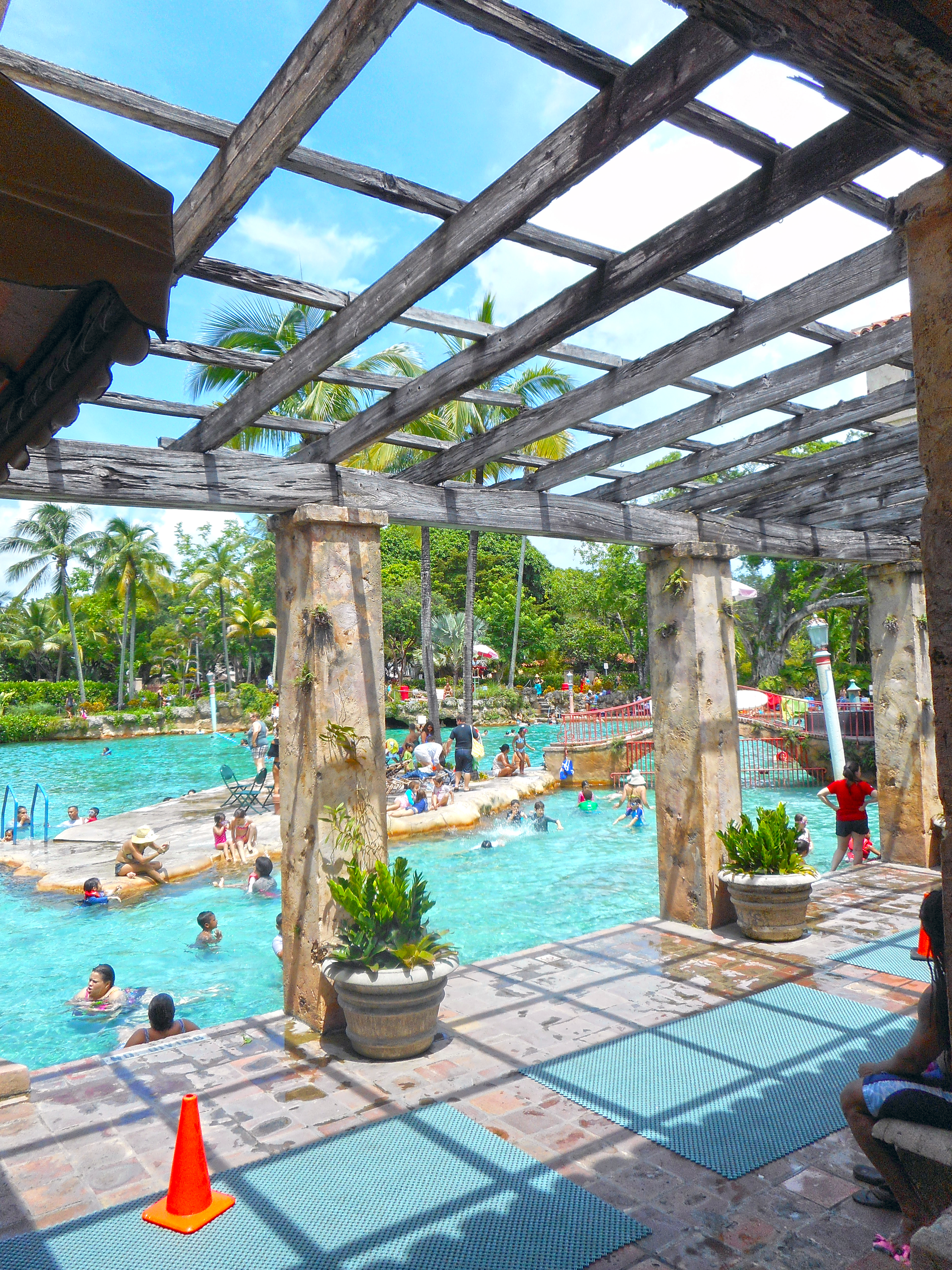
Trellis gallery

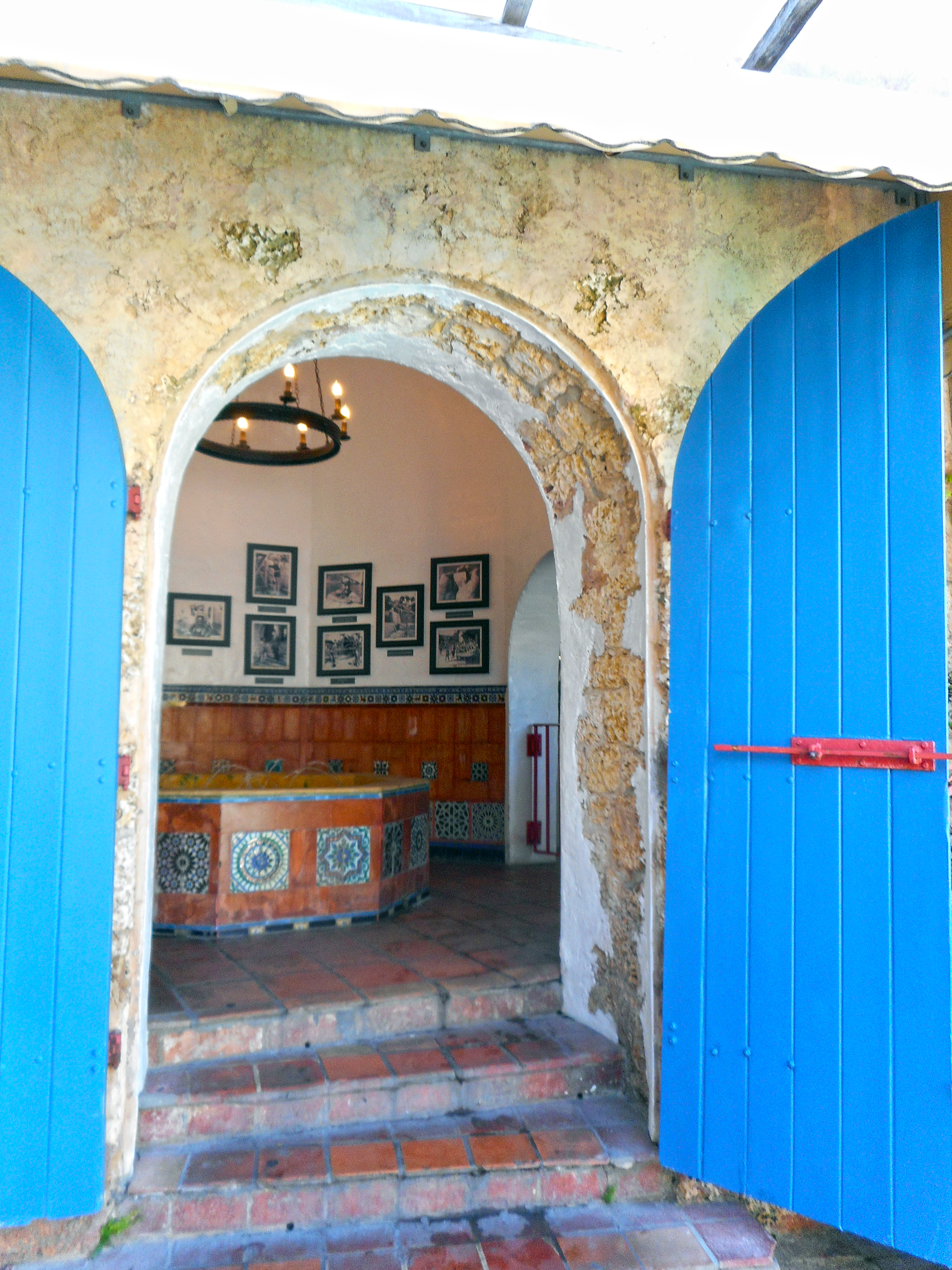
Door leading to water fountain in main building

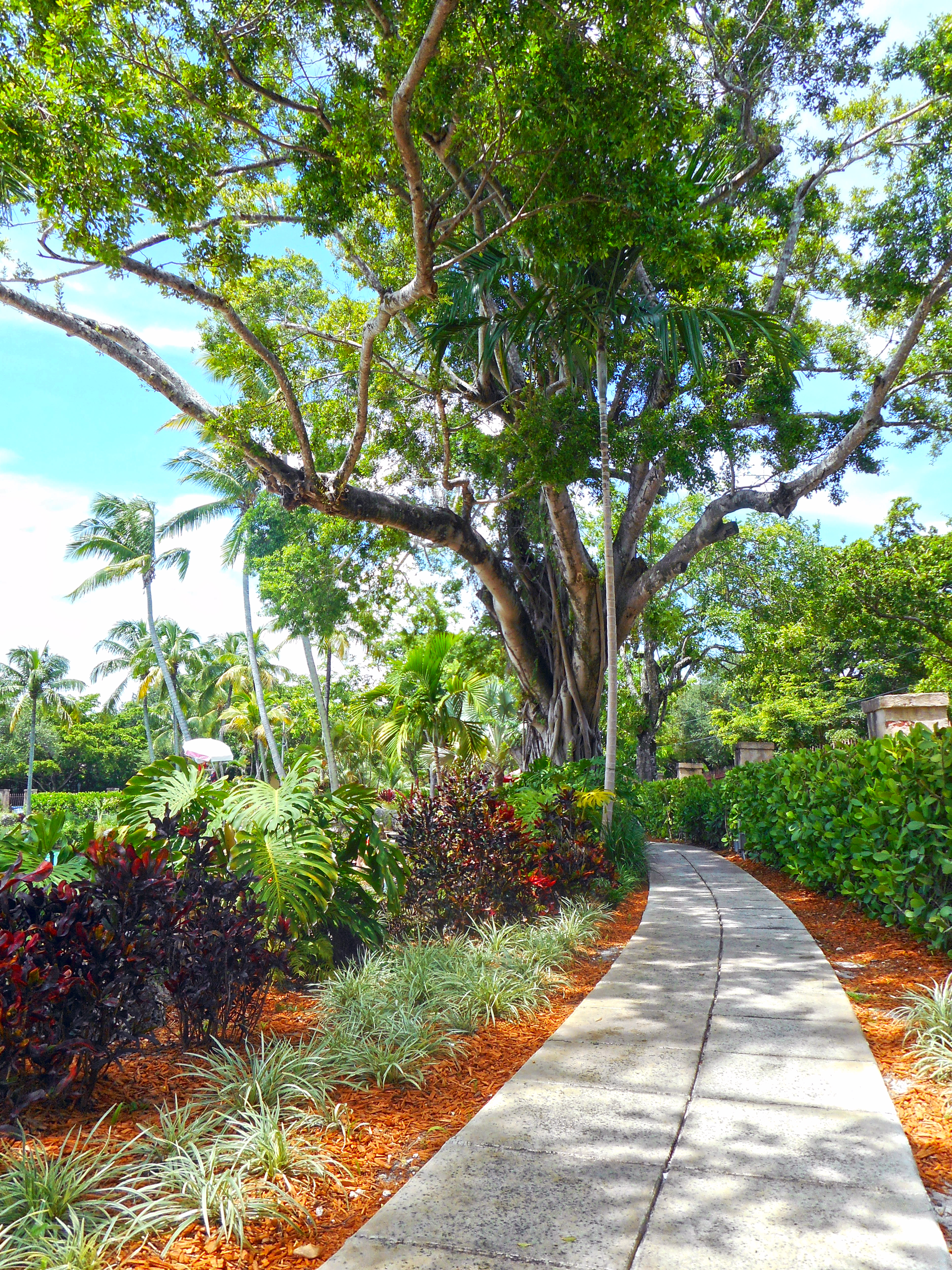
Landscaped path around pool

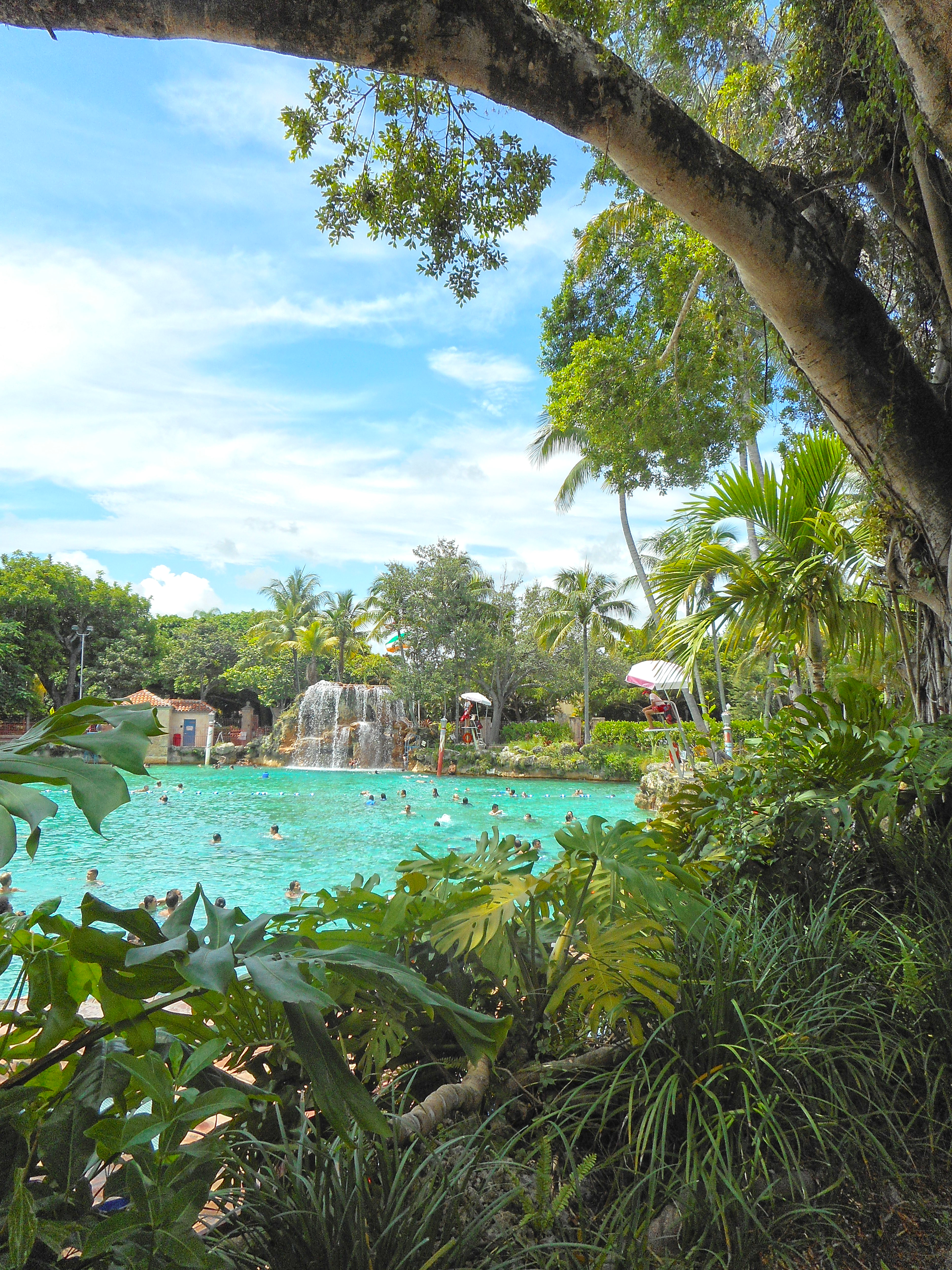
Shrubbery, trees and pool

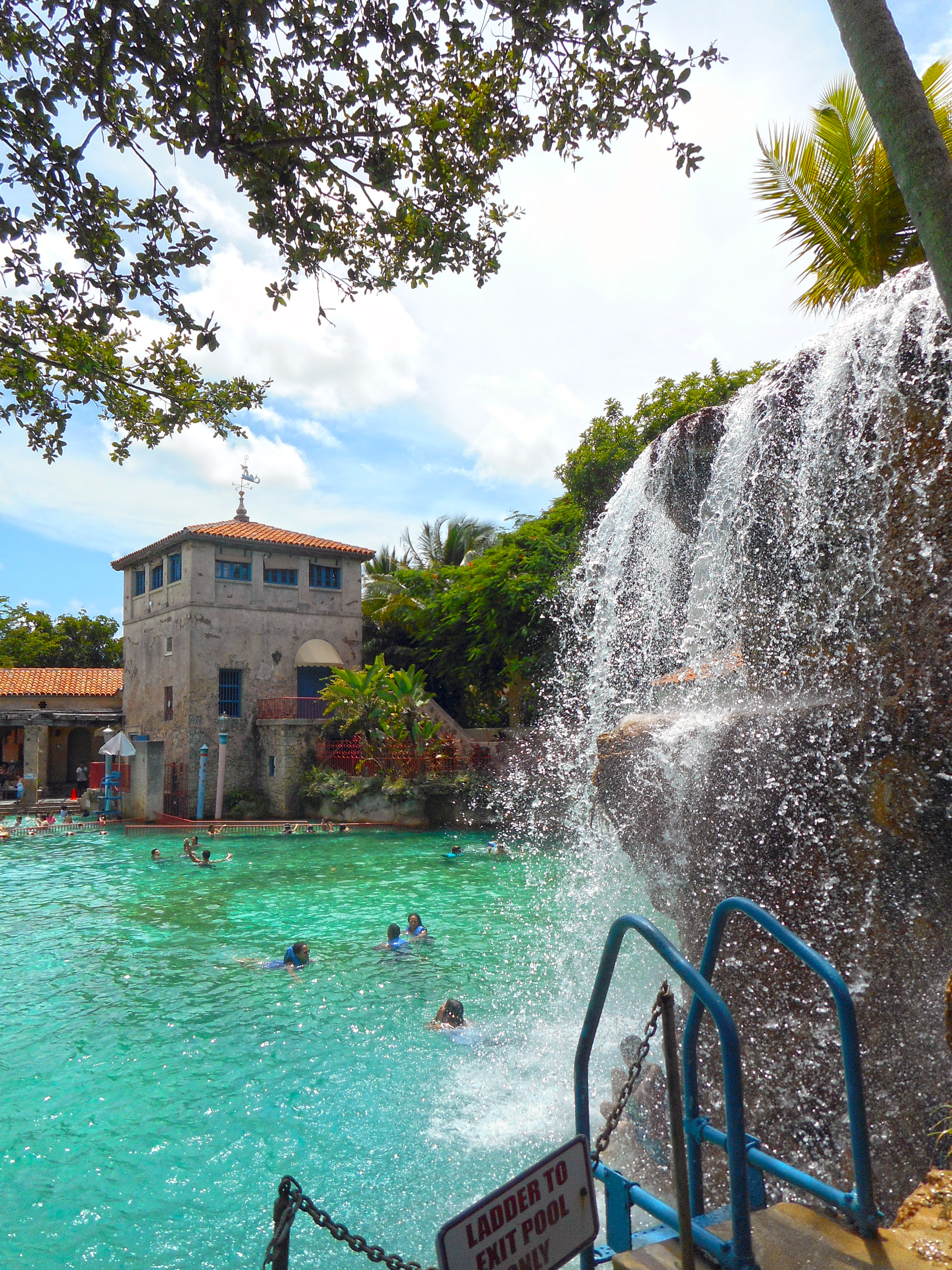
Waterfall and main building

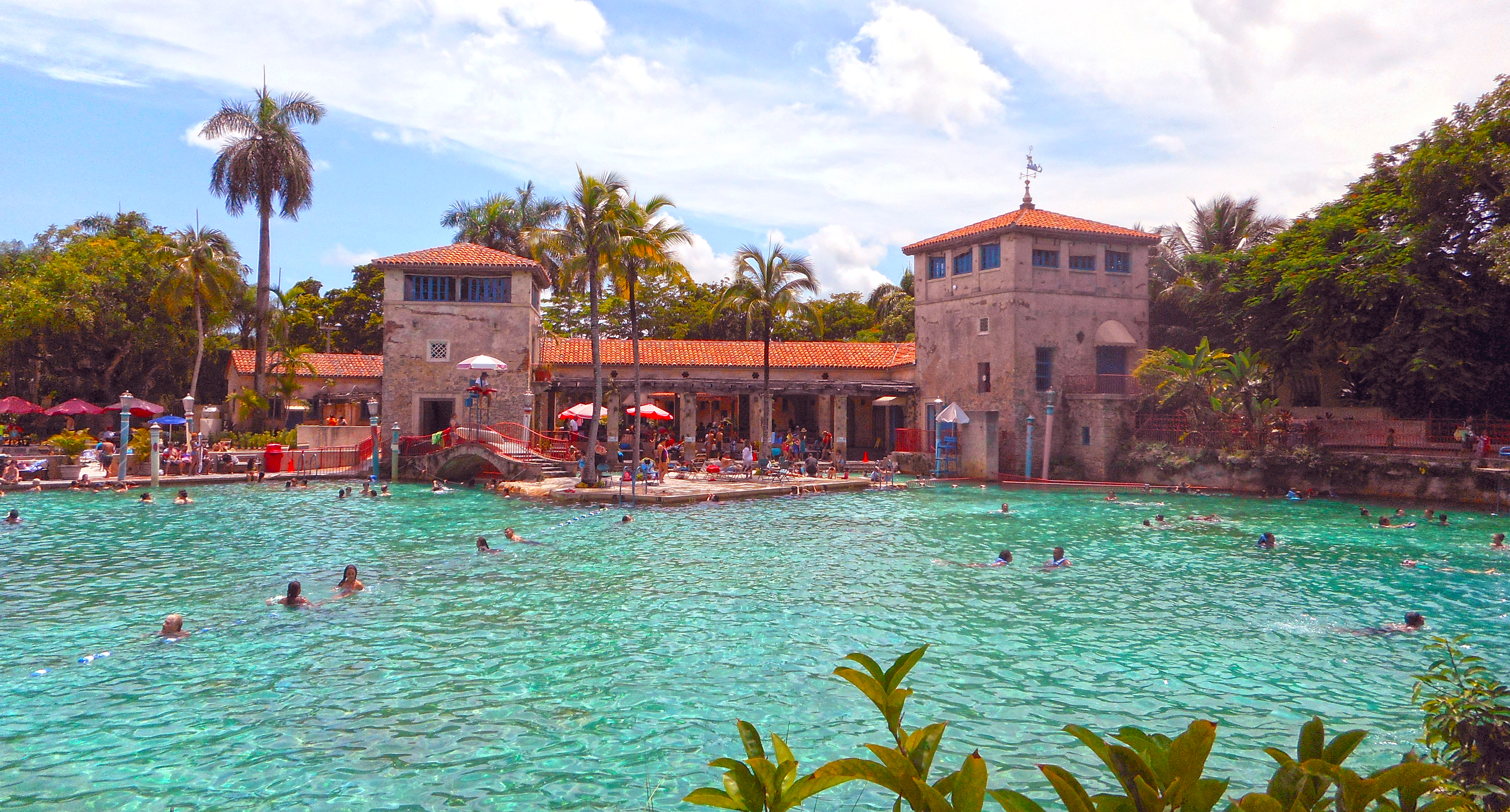
General view of buildings and pool
