= Phineas Paist =

American architect

Phineas P. Paist
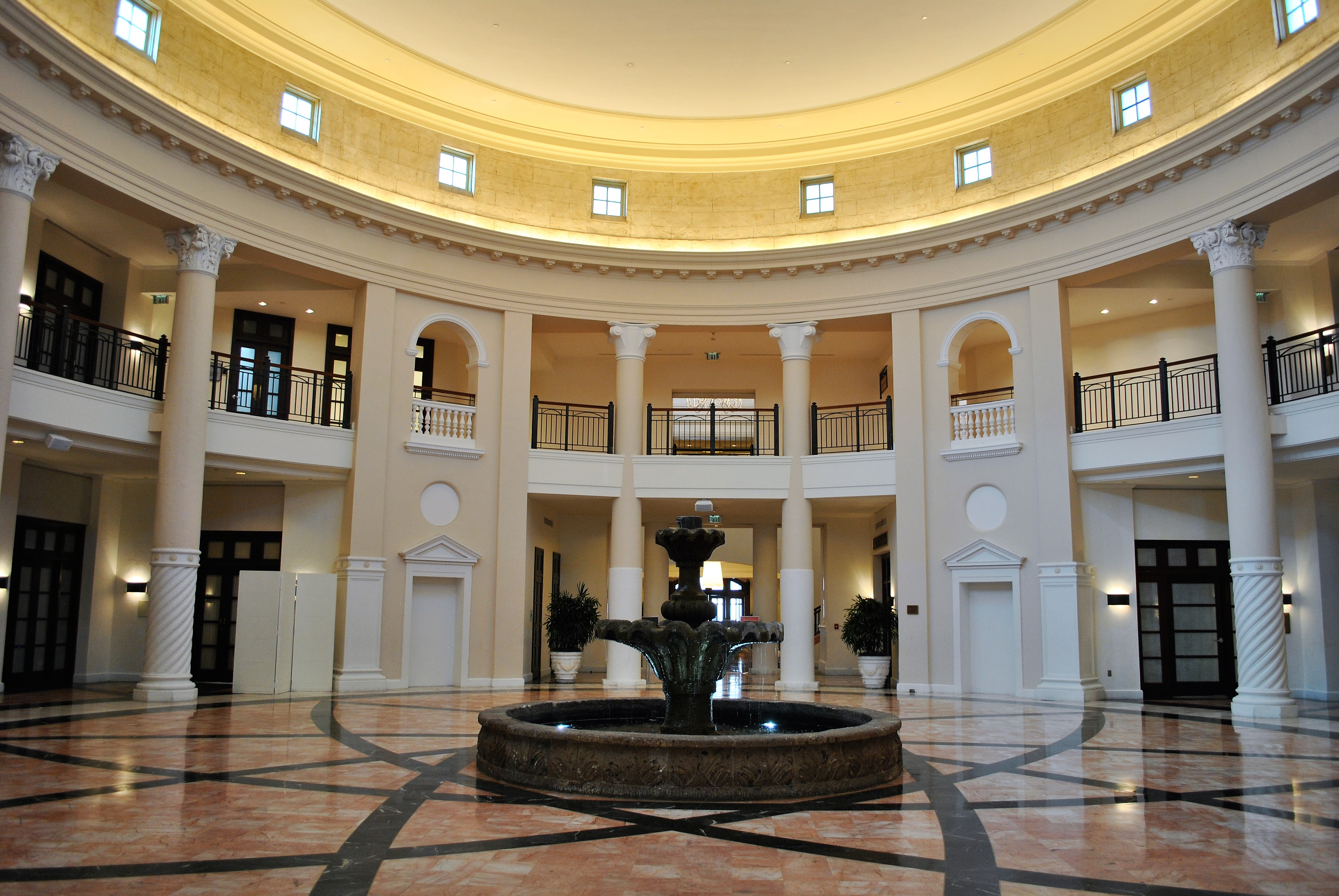
- Colonnade Building in Coral Gables, Florida
- Born: 1875; Pennsylvania, U.S.
- Died: May 02, 1937; Coral Gables, Florida, U.S.
- Education: Pennsylvania Academy of the Fine Arts
- Occupation: Architect
- Projects: City of Coral Gables

Phineas P. Paist (August 28, 1873 – May 2, 1937) was an American architect who was the supervising architect for the Coral Gables Corporation.

He attended Pennsylvania Academy of the Fine Arts. Paist was an architect working for S. Gifford Slocum at age 20. In 1893 he became an associate of G. W. & W. D. Hewitt. He later worked as an associate architect to Paul Chalfin in building the Villa Vizcaya in Florida.

== Some of his projects ==
- Douglas Entrance, 1924, Coral Gables, FL. On the U.S. National Register of Historic Places. With Denman Fink and Walter De Garmo.
- Venetian Pool, 1925, Coral Gables, FL. On the U.S. National Register of Historic Places. With Denman Fink.
- Colonnade Building, 1926, Coral Gables, FL. With Walter De Garmo and Paul Chalfin.
- San Sebastian Apartment Hotel, 1926, Coral Gables, FL.
- Coral Gables City Hall, 1928, Coral Gables. On the U.S. National Register of Historic Places. With Harold Steward.
- Old United States Courthouse, 1931, Miami, FL. On the U.S. National Register of Historic Places.
- Coral Gables Police and Fire Station, 1939, Coral Gables, FL. On the U.S. National Register of Historic Places.
- Charles Deering Estate. On the U.S. National Register of Historic Places.
