= Walter De Garmo =

American architect

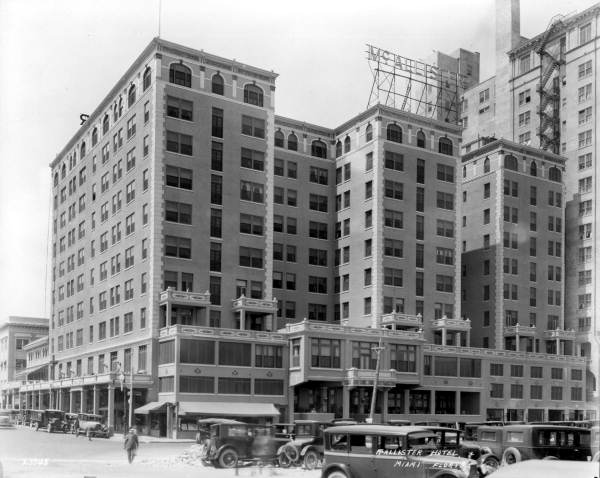
Photograph of the McAllister Hotel in 1926 courtesy of the Florida Photographic Collection. Once the tallest building in Miami, it was eventually demolished.

Walter C. De Garmo (1876–1951) was a prominent architect in Miami, Florida and its surrounding communities. His buildings include the Woman's Club of Coconut Grove and the 1907 Miami City Hall. He is known for his residential work in South Florida, especially large luxury residences in the Mission Revival and Mediterranean Revival styles.

== Biography and career ==
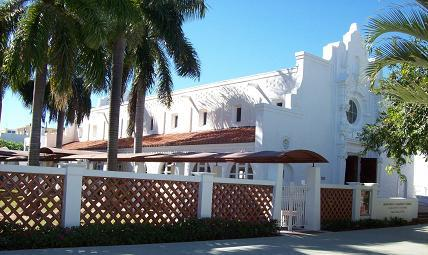
Miami Beach Community Church

De Garmo studied under John Russell Pope, and worked as an architect in New York before moving to Miami. He was the first registered architect in the Miami area. He held a degree in architecture from Cornell University. Marion Manley, Florida's first female architect, interned with De Garmo. He has been referred to as the "Dean of Miami architects."

The 1907 Miami City Hall designed by De Garmo was in use until 1928, when city functions were relocated to the newly built Dade County Courthouse, and the De Garmo building demolished. As of 1996, only two buildings by De Garmo remained in Miami Beach.

=== Coral Gables ===
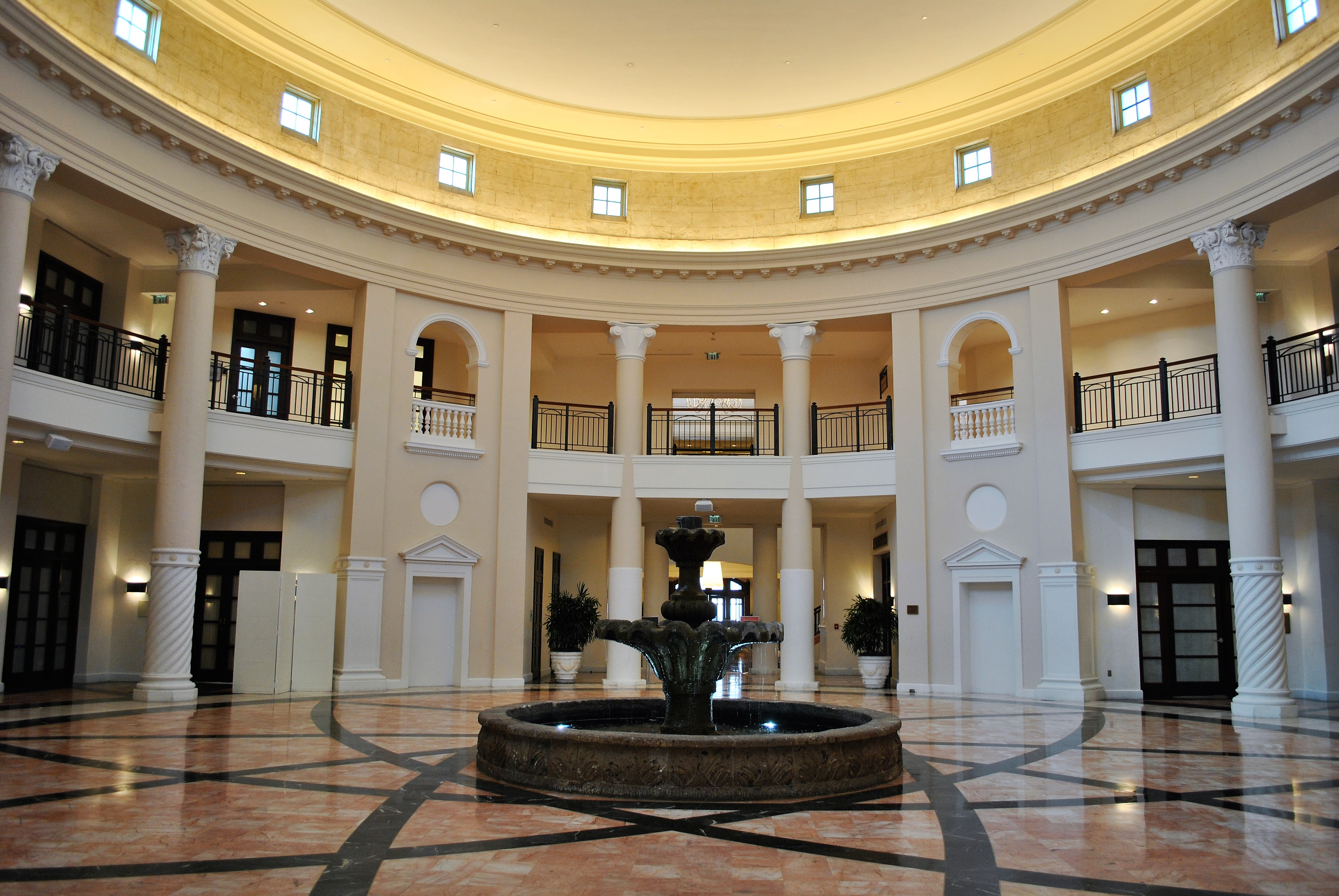
Colonnade Building, 1926, Coral Gables, with Phineas Paist and Paul Chalfin

The developer of Coral Gables, Florida, George E. Merrick, selected De Garmo as "one of the lead architects." In 1924, Degarmo joined with Denman Fink to design the Douglas Entrance in Coral Gables, which is on the U.S. National Register of Historic Places.

A 1926 home in Coral Gables, Florida, described as De Garmo's "masterpiece," was up for sale in 2013 for US$12.5 million. A 1925 luxury residence by De Garmo, Casa Di Paolo, in Star Island, Miami Beach, was described in 2011 as having 12 bedrooms and 13.5 baths, with a "courtyard, arches, Moorish influences and columns," a "separate two-story guesthouse and 100 feet of deep-water dockage."
