= Douglas Entrance =

- U.S. National Register of Historic Places
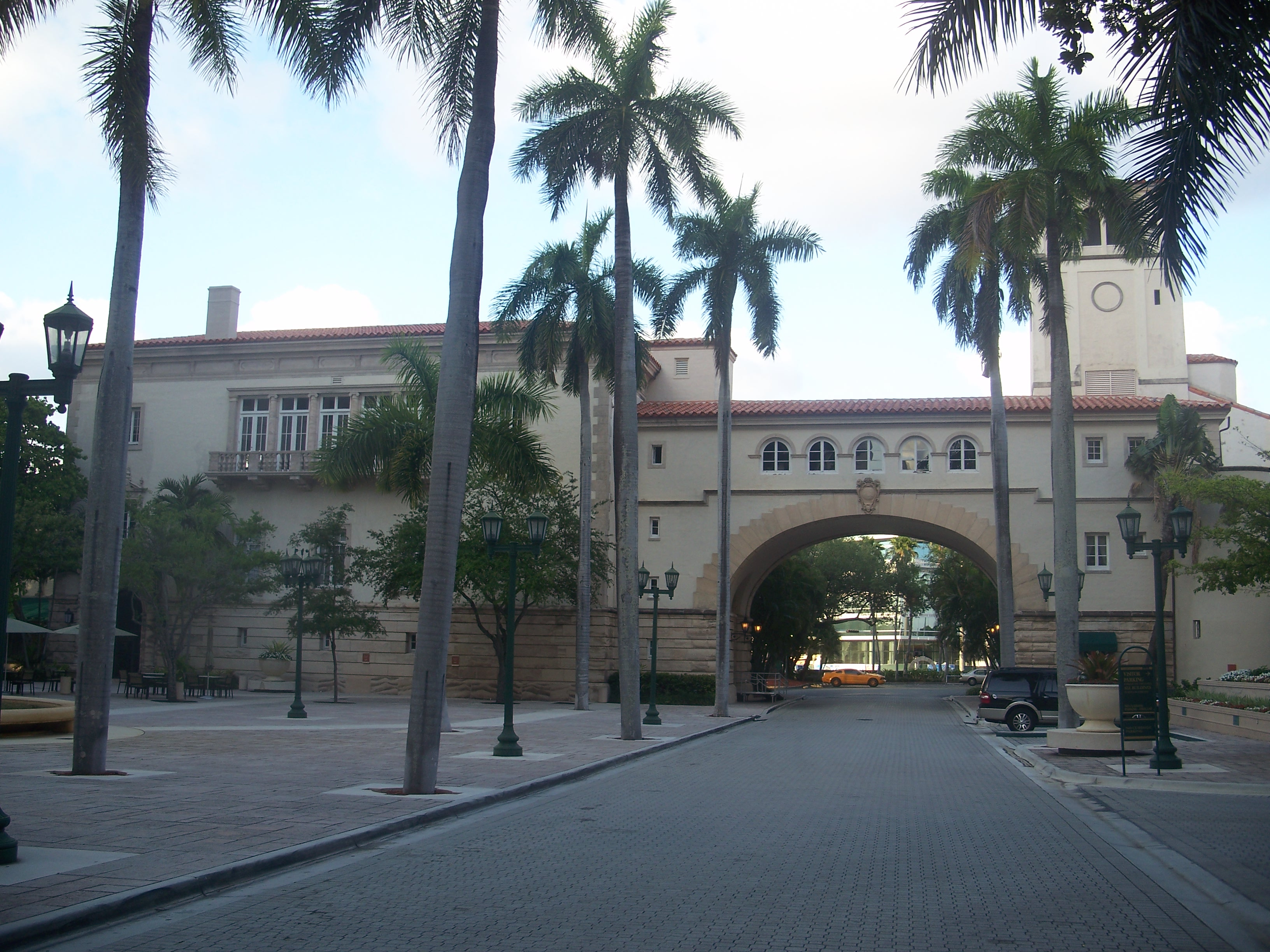
- Douglas Entrance in Coral Gables, Florida, April 2011

- Location within Miami Location within Florida Location within the United States
- Location: Coral Gables, Florida
- Coordinates: 25°45′49″N 80°15′21″W
- Architect: Phineas Paist
- NRHP reference No.: 72000305
- Added to NRHP: September 22, 1972

The Douglas Entrance (also known as La Puerta del Sol) is a historic site in Coral Gables, Florida. It is located at the junction of Douglas Road and Tamiami Trail (US 41). The architect was Phineas Paist and it was completed in 1924. On September 22, 1972, it is listed on the U.S. National Register of Historic Places.

The Douglas Entrance design also involved Denman Fink and Walter De Garmo.
