= Denman Fink =

American painter

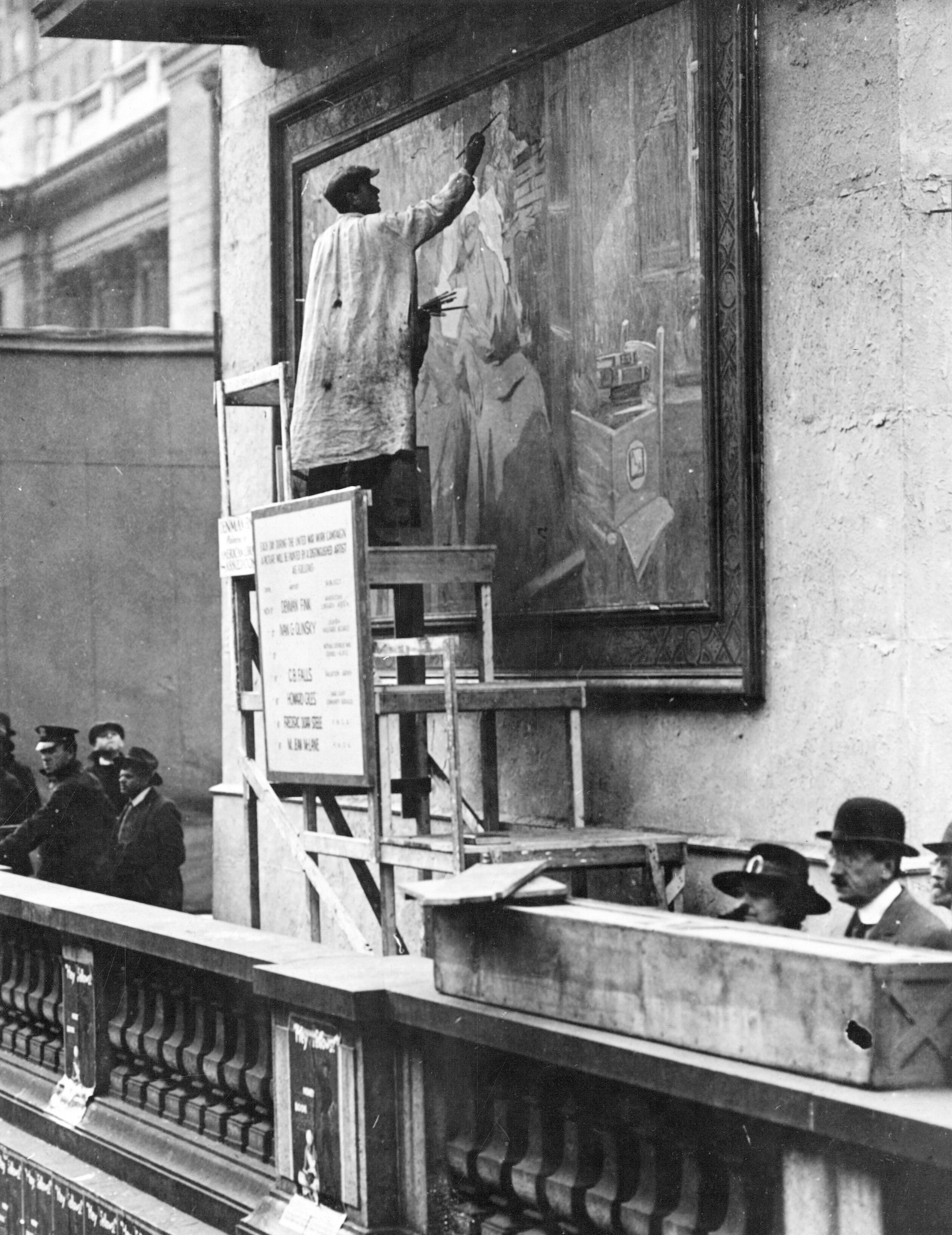
On the first day of the United War Work Campaign, Denman Fink paints a mural at the New York Public Library promoting the American Library Association's services to World War I soldiers blinded in battle. (November 11, 1918)

Denman Fink (1880–1956) was an American artist and magazine illustrator.

== Works ==
He worked with Phineas P. Paist and Walter De Garmo on the Douglas Entrance (1924) in Coral Gables, Florida, a property listed on the National Register of Historic Places. He also designed the Venetian Pool (1925) in Coral Gables, which is also listed on the National Register of Historic Places. The designs were strictly Denman's. The only thing Phineas Paist and Walter De Garmo added was their architect's seal because Denman was not a licensed architect. Denman designed all of the original entrances to Coral Gables and designed the original water tower in the shape of a lighthouse. Fink was artistic advisor for the City of Coral Gables. He also designed the Coral Gables City Hall.

== New Jersey ==
Fink was a long-time resident of Haworth, New Jersey.

== Murals ==
Law Guides Florida Progress (1941), mural at the David W. Dyer Federal Building and United States Courthouse commissioned by the Section of Painting and Sculpture

Fink was commissioned to create United States post office murals by the Treasury Department Section of Painting and Sculpture. At the U.S. Post Office and Courthouse in Miami, he completed a mural titled Law Guides Florida Progress (1941). It is above the judge's bench and is flanked by two pairs of Ionic marble pilasters. The mural depicts the positive impact of justice guiding Florida's economic development. Fink included a likeness of himself as a draftsman and a likeness of architect Phineas E. Paist (with whom he worked in Coral Gables, Florida) as a chemist. At the Lake Wales, Florida post office, he painted a mural titled Harvest Time-Lake Wales in 1942.
