= Coral Gables Villages =

Themed developments in Coral Gables, Florida, US

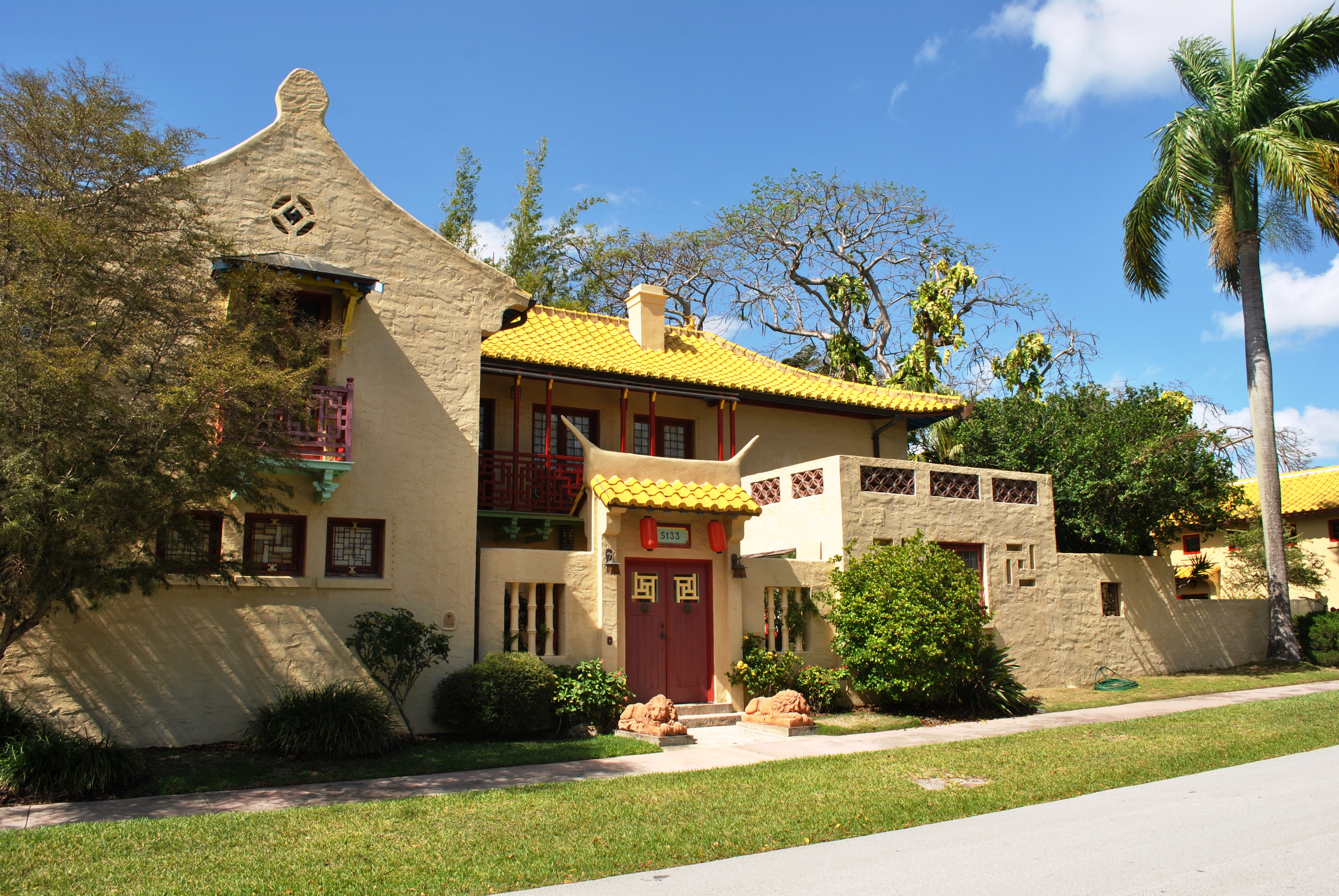
Coral Gables Villages, April 2012

The Villages of Coral Gables are a series of themed developments in Coral Gables, Florida, by city founder George E. Merrick.

== Background ==
=== Concept ===
Within his development of Coral Gables, Florida, a planned city, George E. Merrick decided that he would design small communities, or villages, within Coral Gables with different international influences. The urban planning initiative was called "The Village Project." While the predominant architectural style in Coral Gables in Mediterranean Revival, some of the villages would become rare exceptions intended to add more architectural diversity to the new city it, such with as the Chinese and the Dutch South African Villages. The original plan, devised in collaboration with banker and former Ohio governor Myers Y. Cooper, called for 14 villages at a cost of $75 million, with financing by the American Building Corporation of Cincinnati.

=== Completion ===
The Villages were developed during the foundational real estate boom of the 1920s, and subsequently came to a halt by the end of the decade due to a cascading series of factors in its later half that included the 1926 Miami Hurricane, the 1928 Okeechobee Hurricane, the arrival of the Mediterranean fruit fly, and the onset of the Great Depression with the Wall Street crash of 1929. In all, fewer than 80 of Merrick's intended 1,000 planned village homes were completed before development slowed. The unrealized villages included: Japanese, Italian Country, Neopolitan Baroque, Mexican Hacienda, African Bazaar, Persian Canal, and Tangier villages. Another, far larger-scale unrealized project was the materialization of a Spanish Village. Merrick would later refer his planned Spanish Village as his "unfinished symphony" and was unable to continue his village project before his death due to his financial losses in the Depression.

=== Attempted revival ===
Nearly a century after its premature completion, noted Coral Gables developer Ralph Sanchez and his Ponce Circle Developers firm announced the "Old Spanish Village" development project in the mid-2000s, an intended fulfillment of Merrick's original concept for a Spanish Village. Sanchez was directly inspired by Merrick's "The Village Project" of the early 1920s, which had converted nearly 10,000 acres of the Merrick family's grapefruit plantation into the original architecturally-themed village communities. Sanchez himself spent much of the preceding decade assembling the 7.2 acres of land that would form the core of the new project. The proposed $500 million, 900,000-square-foot project was located in downtown Coral Gables by Ponce Circle and blocks from Miracle Mile. Though large, the mostly residential complex was scaled to retain the localized charm of the Village Project and prominently implemented several elements to support the original spirit and vision of Merrick's plans. Old Spanish Village was designed in the classic Spanish Revival (with some broader elements of Mediterranean Revival) style that is prevalent in much of Coral Gables, including cobblestone walkways, open balconies, lush garden landscaping, swimming pools, and private courtyards. The architecture team composed of a high-profile collaboration between Ignacio Permuy's (son of Jesús Permuy) Coral Gables-based TERRA Architecture firm (now Permuy Architecture) and University of Miami professor Jorge Hernandez, who was responsible for the urban planning aspects.

Sanchez and the architecture team went to signifiancant lengths to ensure the project upheld Coral Gables' historic heritage, especially with respect to the original Village Project. They centrally incorporated and renovated a 1926 Merrick-era three-story art center building located at 2901 Ponce de Leon Boulevard. The renovation, costing over $1.5 million, was intended to serve as a visible and cohesive bridge between the historic elements and the new. Additionally, leading historian and author Arva Moore Parks was hired to join the Old Spanish Village team. In the lead-up to the initial drafting of plans for Old Spanish Village in 2005, they would search extensively through newspaper archives, public documents, and photos relating to the city and the site's history as well as Merrick's plans and achievements. Describing how George Merrick inspired the project, Sanchez said: "He was an incredible visionary and did things that had never been done before," and "He is a hero in this town and this project continues his vision."

The project broke ground in November 2007 and Sanchez invested $128 million into the first phase of Old Spanish Village. This included three-story villas with rooftop terraces, private elevator access, two-car garages, and the Las Porres complex with 50 luxury units in two residential towers with private elevator access. As with the original Village Project, however, Old Spanish Village was slowed substantially by the global economy, in this case the Great Recession, which marred the incomplete development into the early 2010s. Sanchez' death also impacted the competition as he was the main force driving the project conceptually and financially. The project was later renamed "Mediterranean Village" and continued to be plagued with increasing issues, until it was finally bought by the Jose Cuervo Spirits-linked Agave Holdings Development firm. Agave demolished the completed portions of Sanchez' Old Spanish Village and used its consolidated foundation to develop a new, substantially expanded and modern high-end commercial project called "The Plaza Coral Gables", which would grow to encompass 2.25 million square feet.

=== Legacy ===
Describing the concept of the Village Project, Moore Parks stated: "George [Merrick] believed that beauty was for everyone, [...] He was a visionary man who believed you didn’t have to be rich to live in a beautiful setting. He set out to bring that level of beauty to the middle class" and "[...] create a place where people felt special when they were there".

Following the suspension of the original Village Project, their architectural styles would go on to inspire and influence the housing designs of Cincinnati from the 1930-50s with the return of Myers Cooper and the American Building Corporation of Cincinnati. During this period, the French Normandy Village was sold to the University of Miami in 1935 and by the early 1940s would house five fraternities. The remaining six historical villages, most of which were completed by 1927, have been designated "Landmark Homes" by the City of Coral Gables.

The Village of Merrick Park, a shopping mall and park built in 2002, despite its name, is unrelated to these architecturally-themed communities.

== The Villages ==
The still existing villages are:

- Dutch South African Village: inspired by the Dutch colonist farmhouses in 17th century South Africa. Architect: Marion Sims Wyeth. Contributing properties: 6612, 6700, 6704, 6710 LeJeune Road and 6705 San Vicente Street.
- Chinese Village: inspired by Oriental architecture, all houses are linked by a common wall, creating a unique compound. Architect: Henry Killam Murphy. 1926–1927. Contributing properties: bounded by Sansovino Avenue, Castania Avenue, Maggiore Street, Riviera Drive, and Menendez Avenue.
- French City Village: inspired by the city village houses in 18th century France. Architects: Mott B. Schmidt (Italian Renaissance houses along the north side of Hardee Road) and Philip Goodwin (rustic style houses on the south side of Hardee Road). Contributing properties: 1000 block of Hardee Road.
- French Country Village: inspired by the country houses in 18th century France. Architects: Frank J. Forster (farm style homes), Edgar Albright and Phillip L. Goodwin (rustic style homes). Contributing properties: 500 block of Hardee Road.
- French Normandy Village: inspired by the village houses in 15th century France. Architect: John and Coulton Skinner. 1926–1927. Contributing properties: bounded by LeJeune Road, Viscaya Court, Viscaya Avenue, and Alesio Avenue.
- Florida Pioneer Village/Colonial Village: in the Georgial Colonial style and inspired by New England architecture. Architects: John Pierson, and John and Coulton Skinner. 1925–1926. Contributing properties: 4320, 4409, 4515, 4520, and 4620 Santa Maria Street. Included in 2007 in the Santa Maria Street Historic District.
- Italian Village: 17 houses inspired by Italian farm houses. Architects: Alfred L. Klingbeil, John and Coulton Skinner, R. F. Ware, and Robert Law Weed. 1925–1927. Contributing properties: bounded by San Antonio Avenue, San Esteban, Segovia Street and Monserrate Street.

== Gallery ==
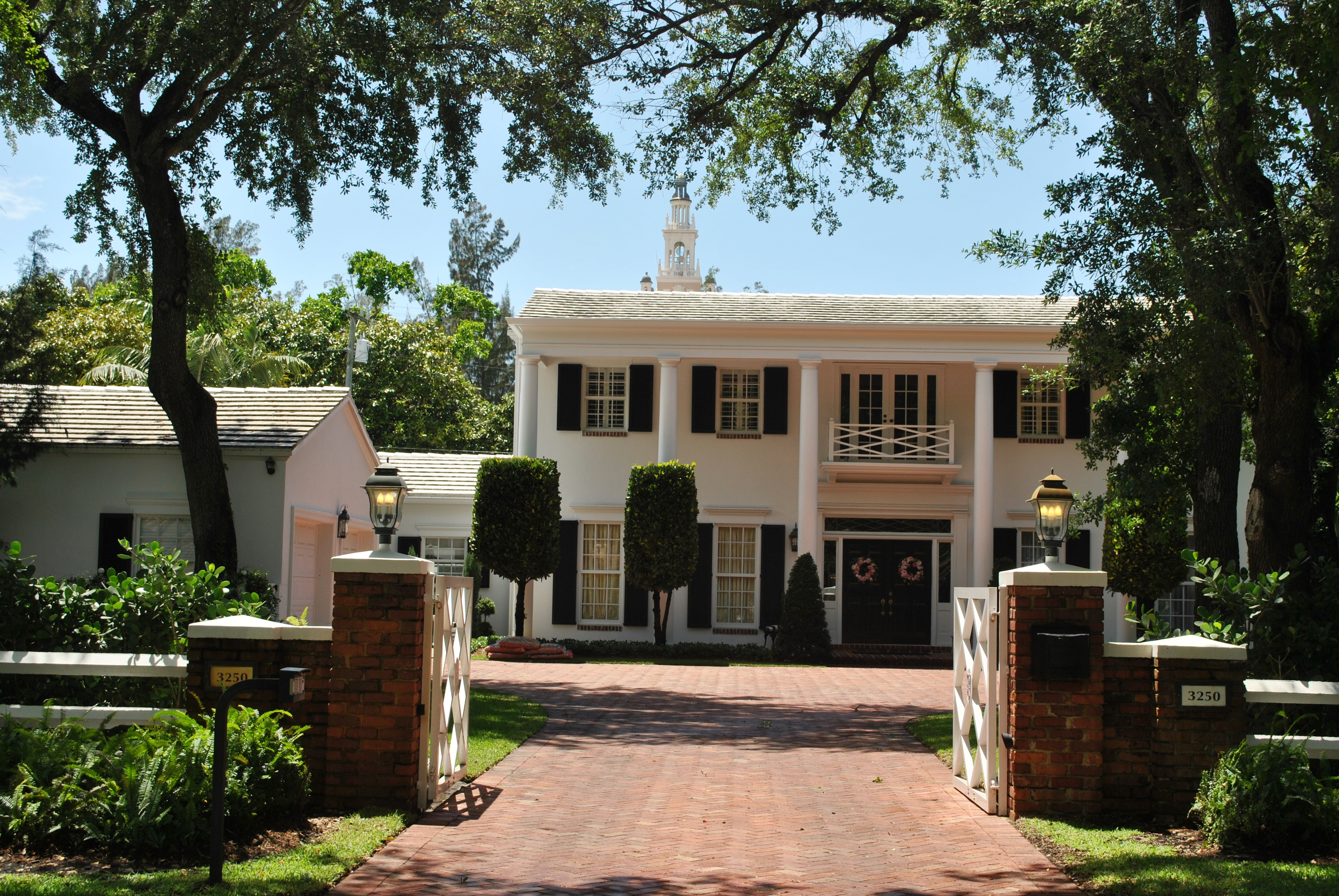
Colonial Village (John Pierson, John and Coulton Skinner, 1925–1926)

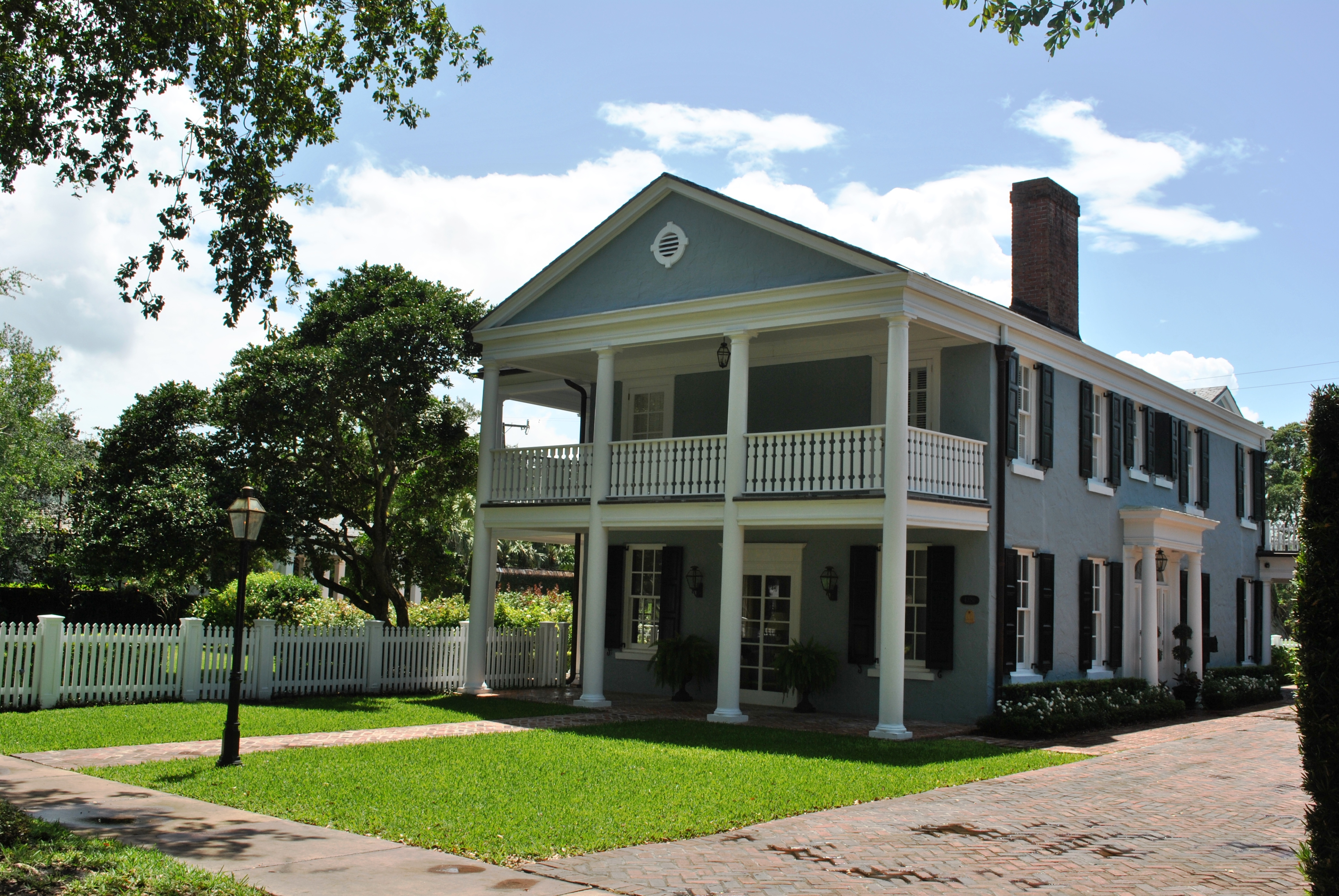
Colonial Village (John Pierson, John and Coulton Skinner, 1925–1926)

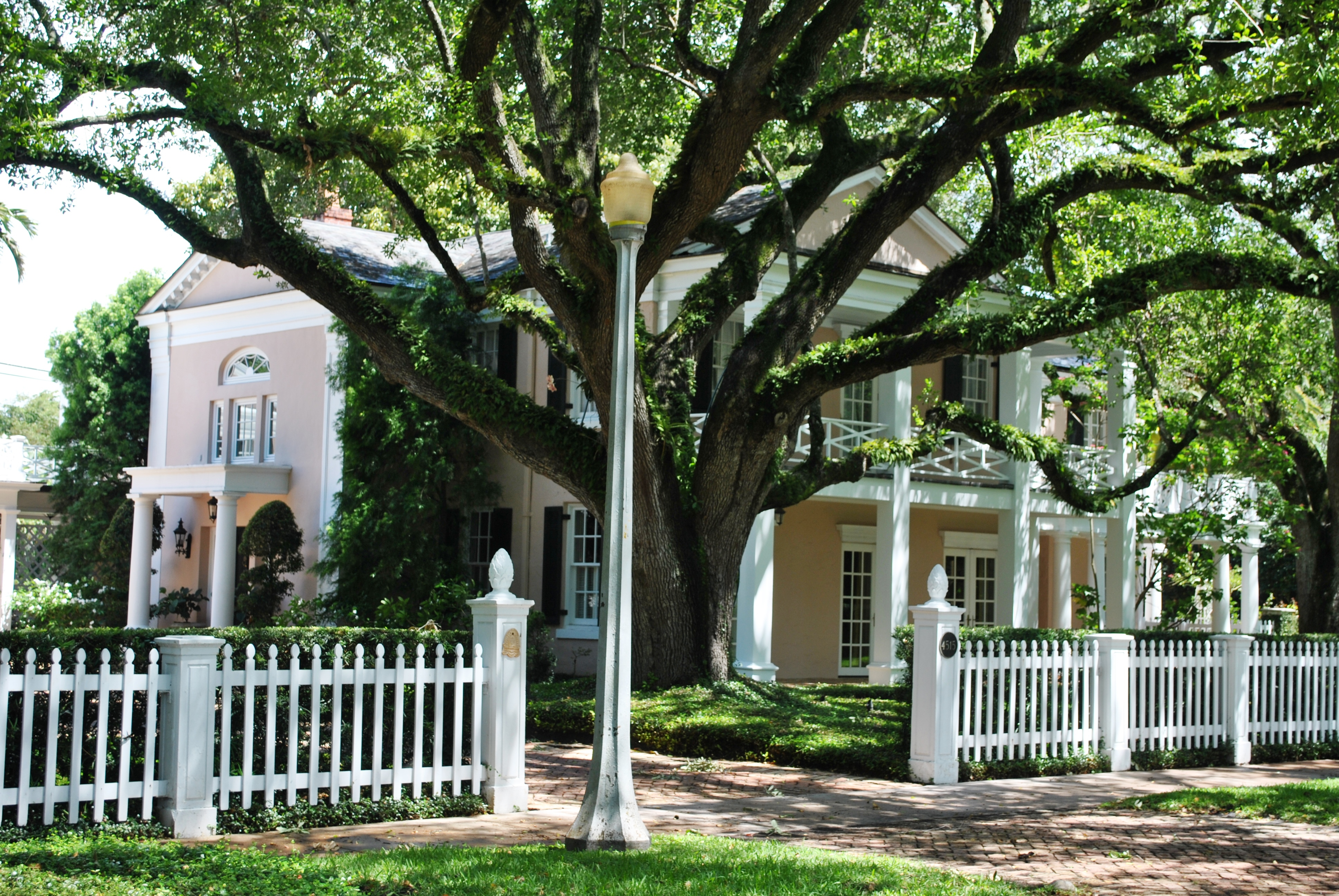
Colonial Village (John Pierson, John and Coulton Skinner, 1925–1926)

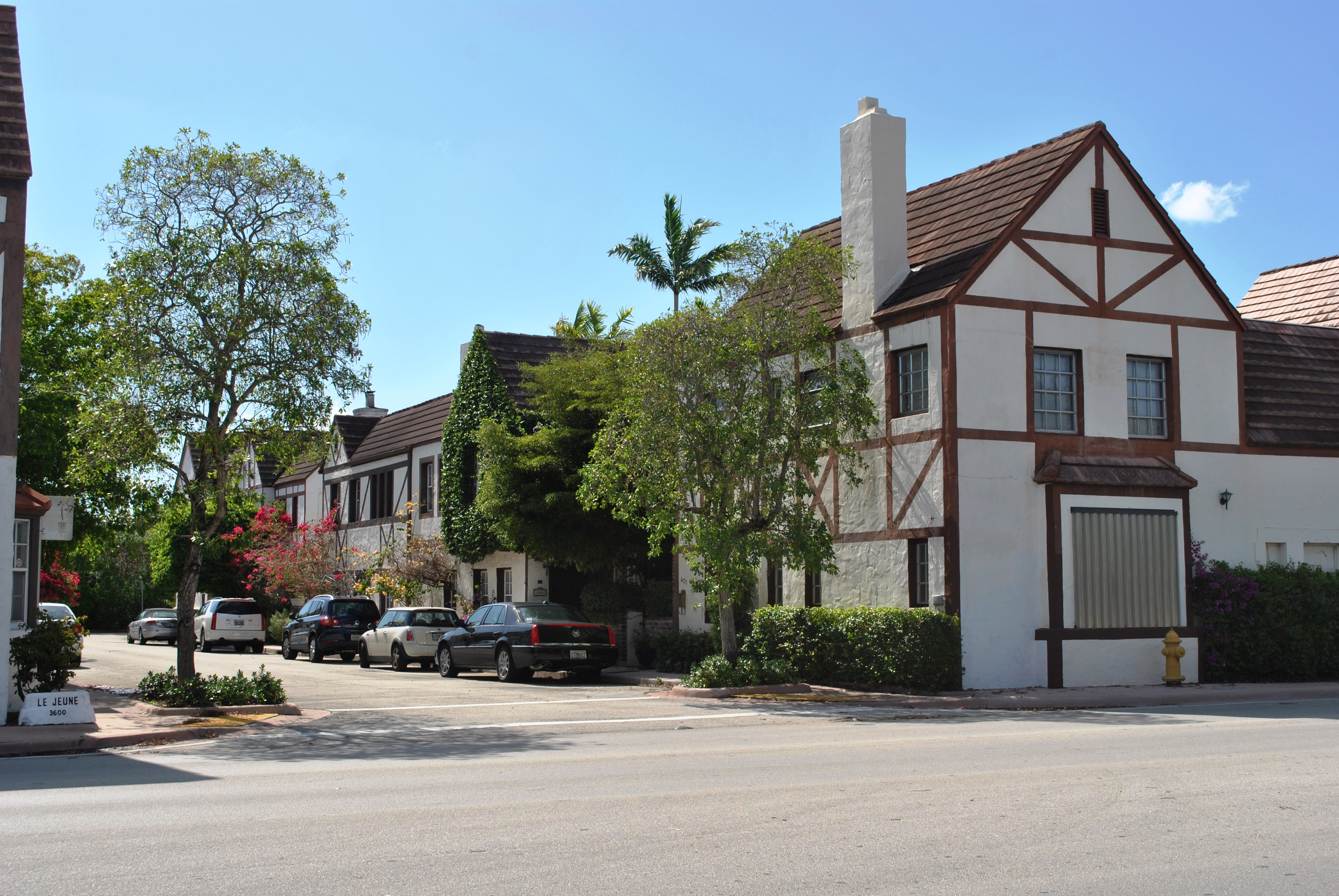
French Normandy Village (John and Coulton Skinner, 1926–1927)
