= Mott B. Schmidt =

American architect

- Born: Mott Brooshovft Schmidt; September 2, 1889; Middletown, New York
- Died: July 22, 1977 (aged 87); New London, Connecticut
- Education: Pratt Institute
- Occupation: Architect
- Spouses: Elena Bachman (m. 1922; died 1955) Katherine Temple Lapsley (m. 1958)
- Buildings: Mount Kisco Municipal Complex; 655 Park Avenue

Mott Brooshovft Schmidt (September 2, 1889 – July 22, 1977) was an American architect best known for his buildings in the American Georgian Classical style.

== Early life ==
Schmidt was born in Middletown, New York, on September 2, 1889, and was named in honor of Dr. Valentine Mott, a friend of the Schmidt family. He was a son of Edward Mott Schmidt (1838–1909) and, his third wife, Frances M. (née Jennette) Schmidt (1864–1940), and grew up in a brownstone at 671 Park Place, near Prospect Park and Grand Army Plaza.

Schmidt was a fourth-generation American of German and Irish ancestry. His great-grandfather was Dr. John William Schmidt; his grandfather, Dr. John W. Schmidt Jr., was the first visiting surgeon at St. Vincent's Hospital and helped start the New York Academy of Medicine in 1847.

He attended public schools in Brooklyn. After graduating with a degree in architecture from the Pratt Institute in 1906, he took a two-year Grand Tour on which he drew many of Europe's best-known monuments.

== Career ==
After returning from Europe, Schmidt worked as an apprentice in the New York architecture office of Carrére and Hastings for four years. There he learned not only to build using modern materials, but also to design in the classical styles favored by Beaux Arts trained architects. Founding his own practice in 1912, he took small residential jobs, remodeling townhouses in Brooklyn and Manhattan, and some commercial projects.

During World War I, Schmidt served stateside in the U.S. Army as a First Lieutenant, supervising military installations at the Edgewood Arsenal in Maryland and at Hastings-on-Hudson, New York, during 1917 and 1918. During this period, he also completed a townhouse for Herbert J. Johnson and in 1917, the alteration of a townhouse at 39 East 63rd Street for Grenville T. Emmet (later U.S. Minister to Austria and the Netherlands), Schmidt's first important commission. Two years after the Emmet project's completion, Architectural Record wrote about it, bringing him professional recognition and attracting new patrons.

=== Sutton Place ===
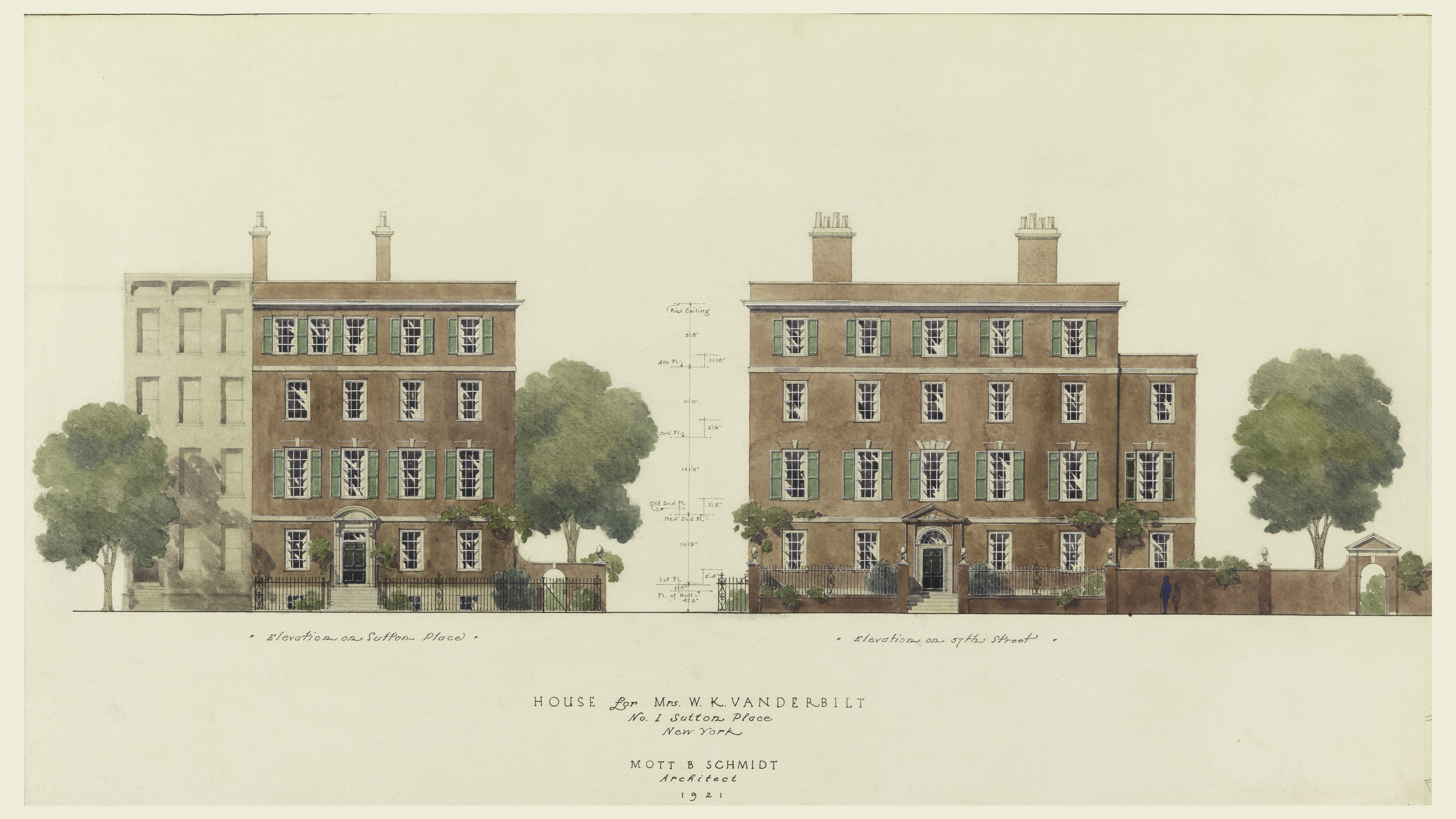
Rendering of One Sutton Place, 1921.

In the early 1920s, Schmidt was hired by wealthy socialites Anne Harriman Vanderbilt, second wife of William Kissam Vanderbilt; and Anne Morgan, daughter of banker J. Pierpont Morgan; and Elisabeth Marbury, to design their townhouses in the then-new Sutton Place neighborhood in Manhattan, which up to that point had been known as a "squalid place." For Vanderbilt, who had purchased the former home of Effingham B. Sutton, at 1 Sutton Place, Mott renovated the existing structure beyond recognition, transforming the home into a 13-room townhouse with terraced gardens that overlooked the East River. The $75,000 renovation was complemented by interiors designed by Elsie de Wolfe.

While the society pages of The New York Times initially scoffed at the choice of location, and referred to the area as an "Amazon Enclave," the commissions launched Schmidt's career, and by 1929, the neighborhood had firmly transformed into a luxury enclave.

=== Pook's Hill ===
In 1926, Schmidt built a gracious brick country home for his family in Bedford, New York. It was called Pook's Hill, after a children's book by Rudyard Kipling. The house won first prize in a 1931 competition for "A Common Brick House," published in The Architectural Forum, and was exhibited featured in the Architectural League of New York's 1932 yearbook. Schmidt sold the home in the 1950s.

=== Other works ===
Apartment buildings designed by Schmidt include 655 Park Avenue in 1924, 1088 Park Avenue in 1924, and the Vincent Astor Townhouse in 1926. Vincent Astor was the only son of John Jacob Astor IV (who died aboard the Titanic) and Ava Lowle Willing. He also designed the Italian Renaissance houses along the north side of Hardee Road in Coral Gables French City Village.

His civic works include the Mount Kisco Municipal Complex. He also designed the 1966 Susan B. Wagner wing of Gracie Mansion in New York City, an $800,000 two-story addition that included a ballroom modeled after the one in a 1790 house built for the Lyman family of Waltham, Massachusetts.

== Personal life ==
In June 1922, Schmidt was married to Elena Bachman (1890–1955), who was raised in Colombia and was the daughter of a Swiss businessman. Elena was an interior decorator in Elsie de Wolfe's office who later designed the decor and furnishings for the Rainbow Room in Rockefeller Center in 1934. Together, they were the parents of one daughter: Elena Anne Schmidt (1924–1954), who married William R. Chandler, a son of Alfred Dupont Chandler, in 1947.

In 1958, after the death of his first wife, he was married to Katherine Temple Lapsley in Bedford Village, New York. Katherine, a daughter of John Willard Lapsley and graduate of the Ethel Walker School, was previously married to, and divorced from, Melville E. Stone II.

In 1922, Schmidt was sketched by Albert Sterner and his first wife was painted by Bernard Boutet de Monvel.

Schmidt died at the Lawrence and Memorial Hospital in New London, Connecticut on July 22, 1977.

== Gallery ==
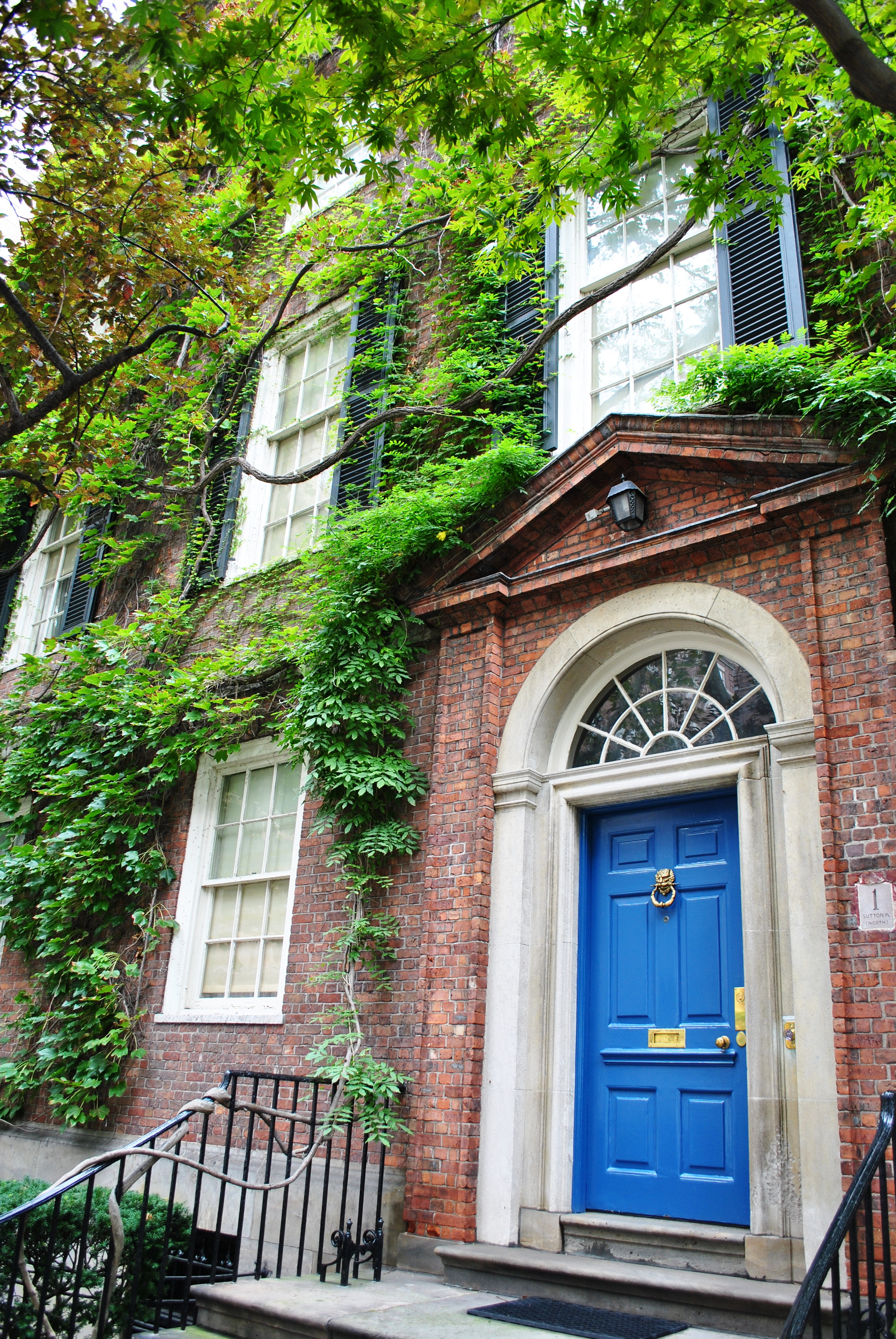
One Sutton Place North, New York City (completed 1921)

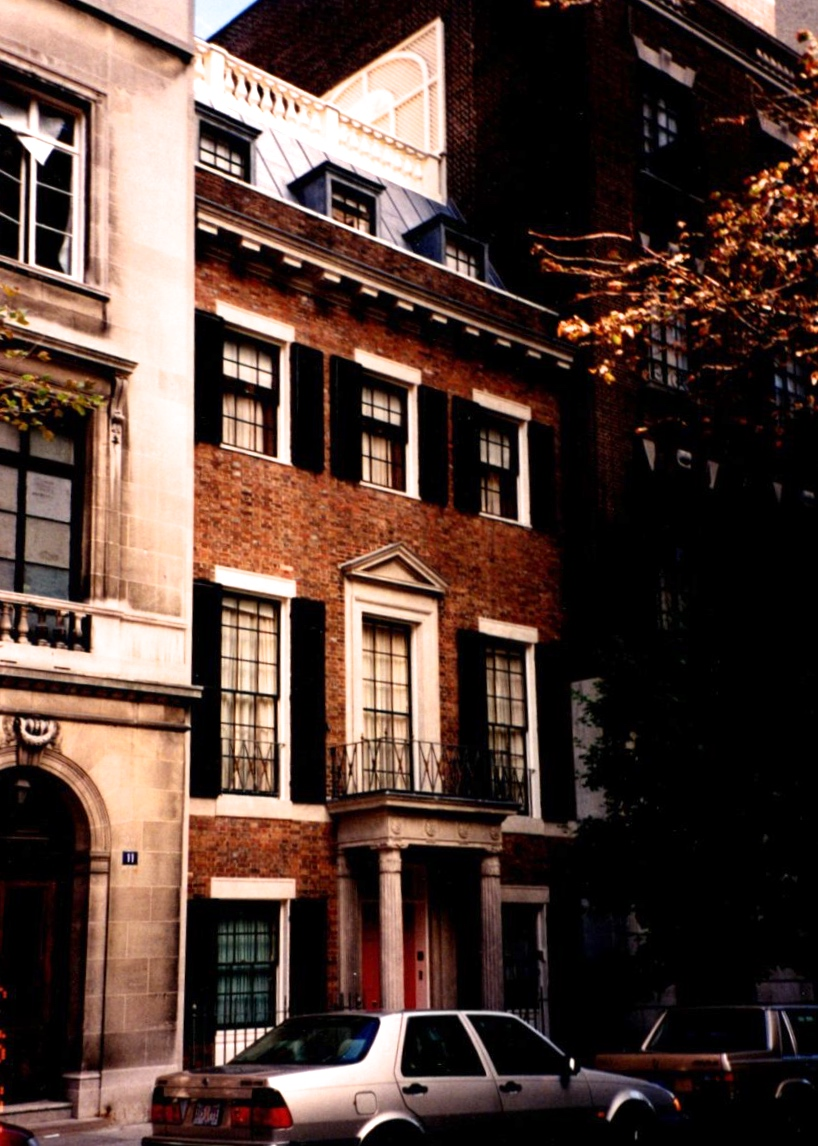
Emily Trevor Townhouse, New York City (completed 1926).

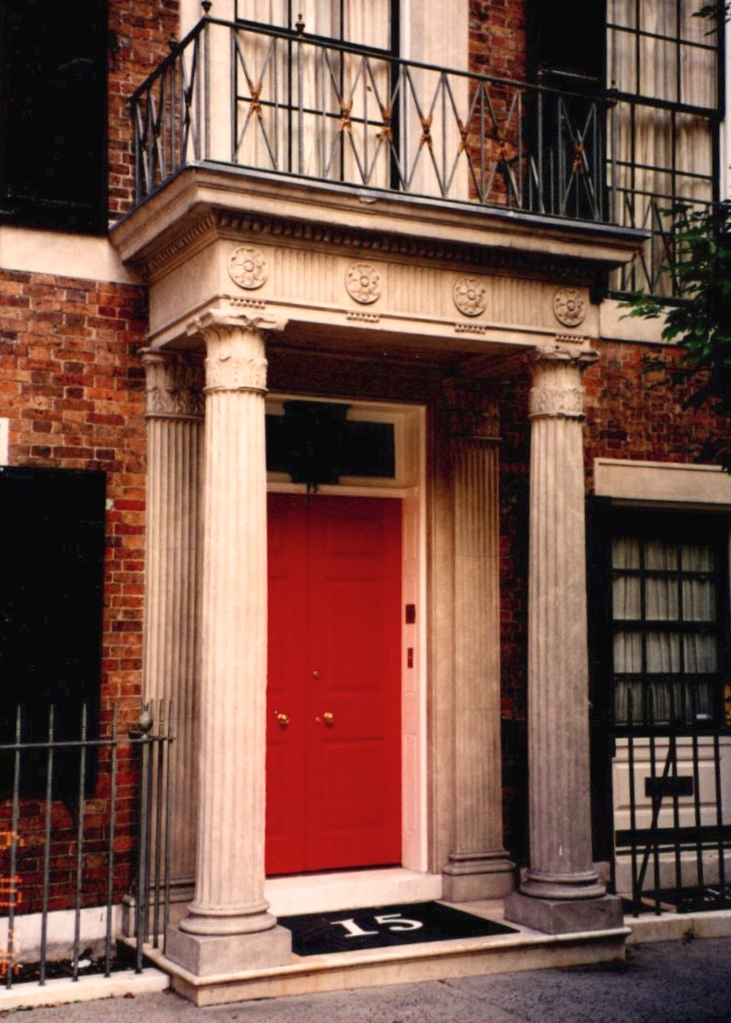
The Entrance Portico of the Trevor Townhouse.

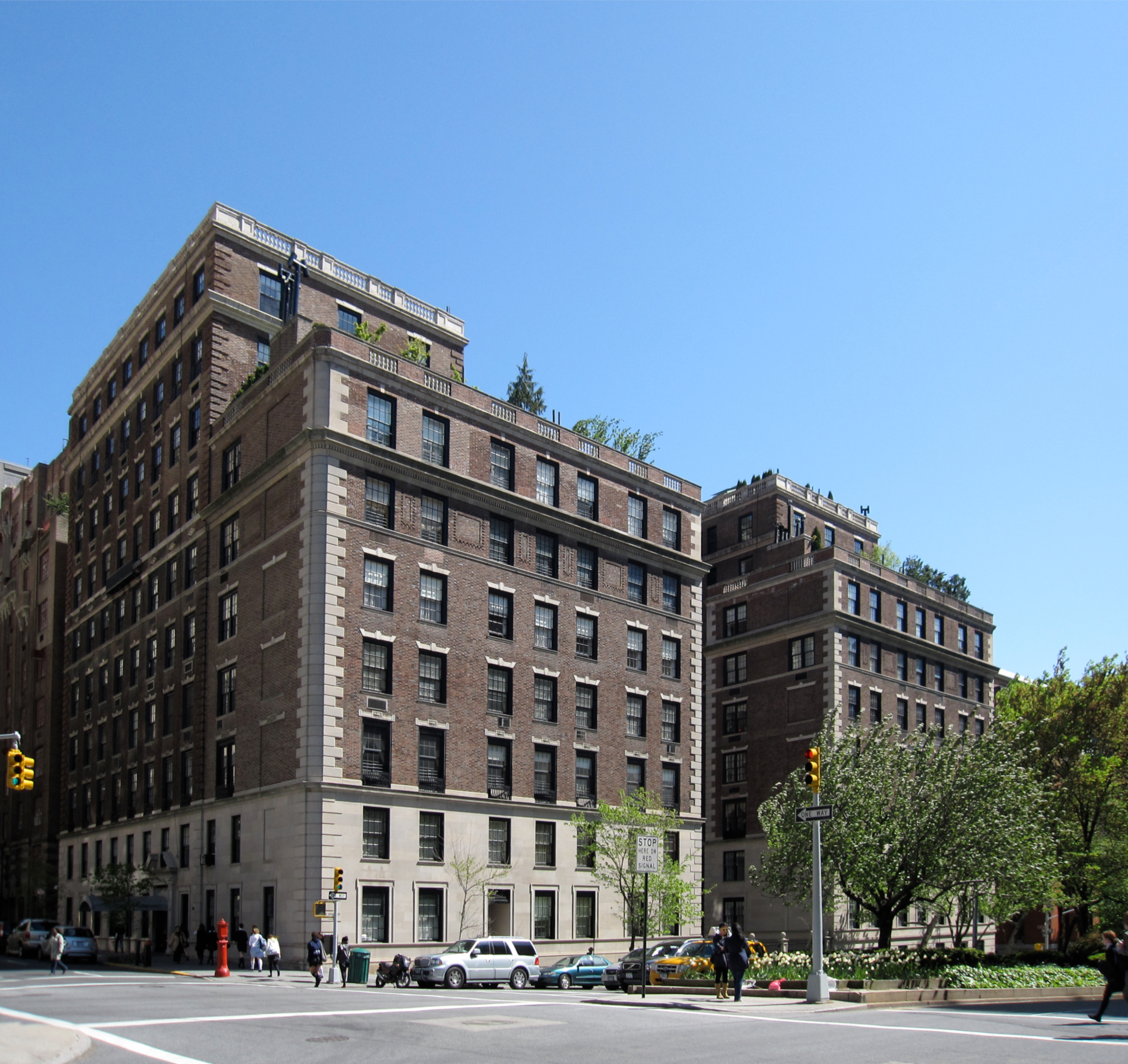
655 Park Avenue, New York City (completed 1924).

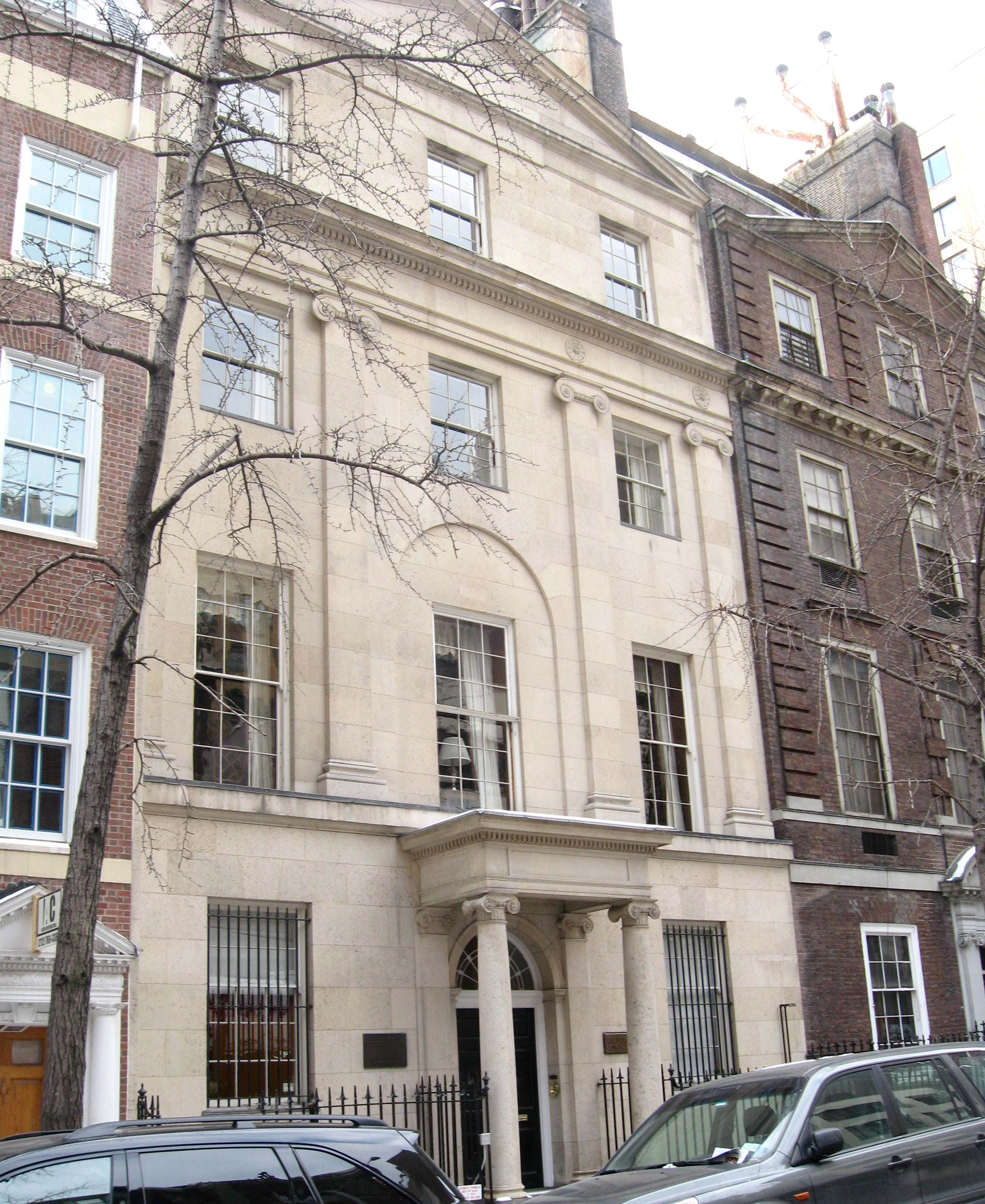
Vincent Astor Townhouse, New York City (completed 1927).

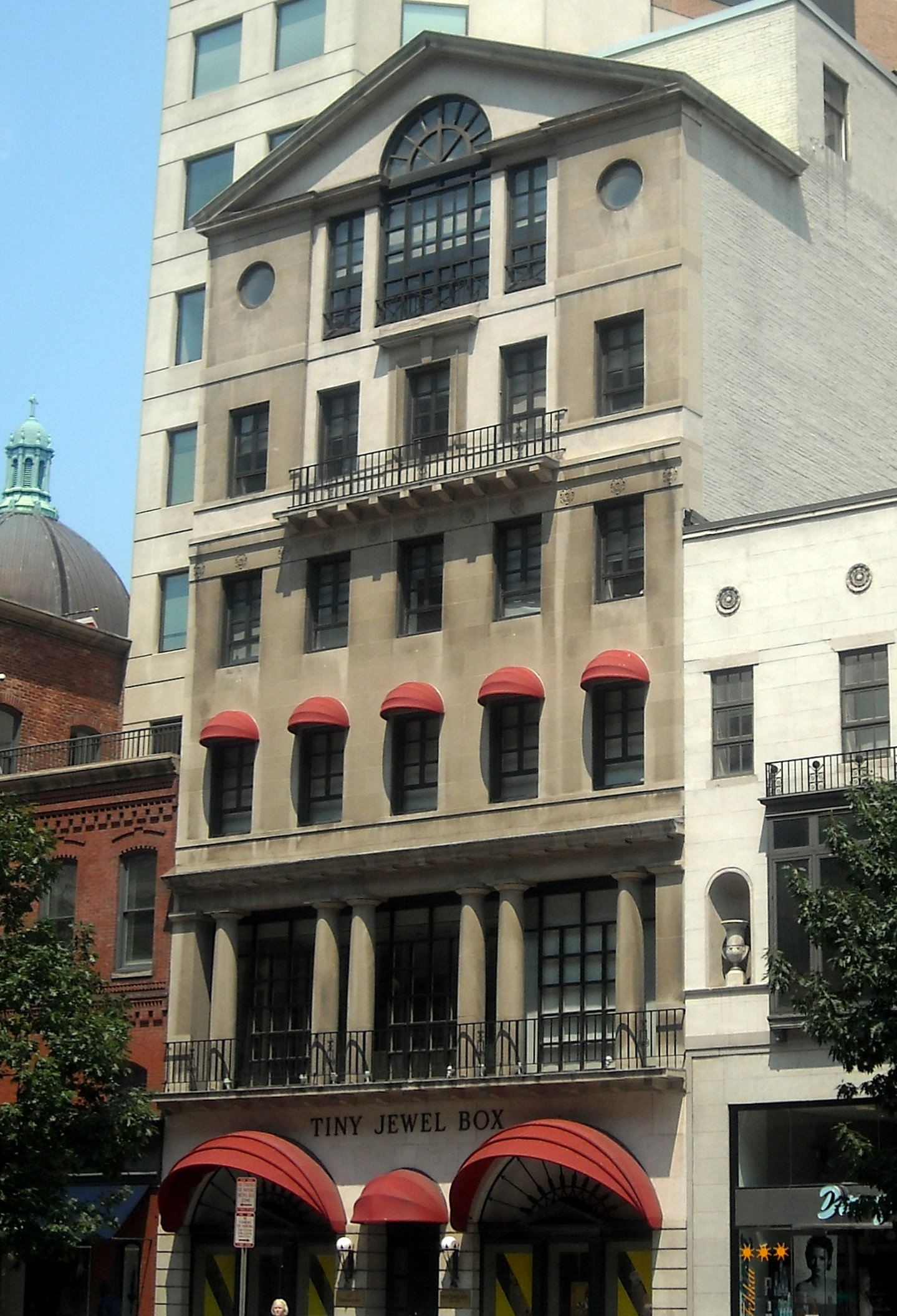
Elizabeth Arden Building, Washington DC (completed 1929).

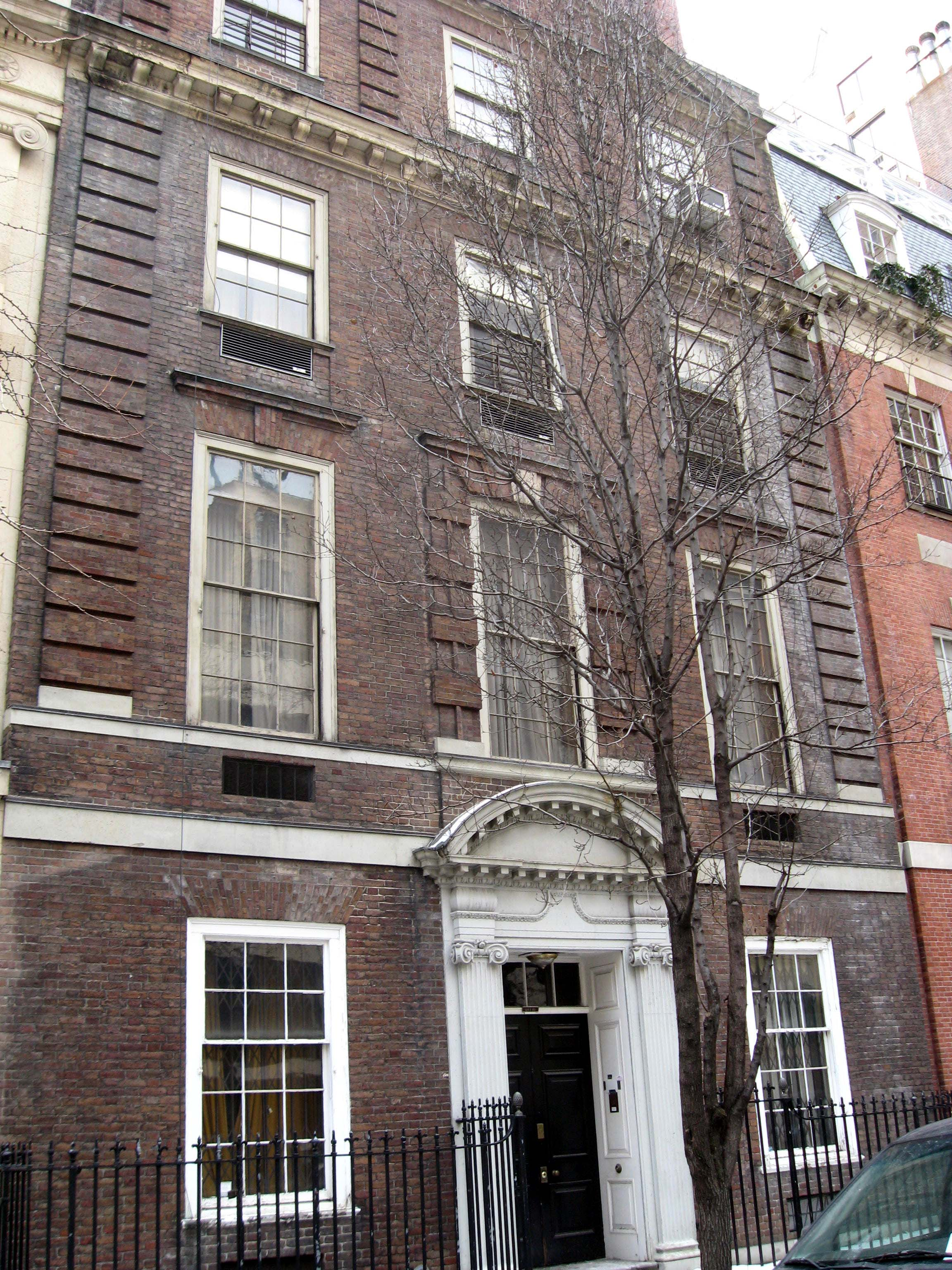
Douglas Dillon Townhouse, New York City (completed 1930).

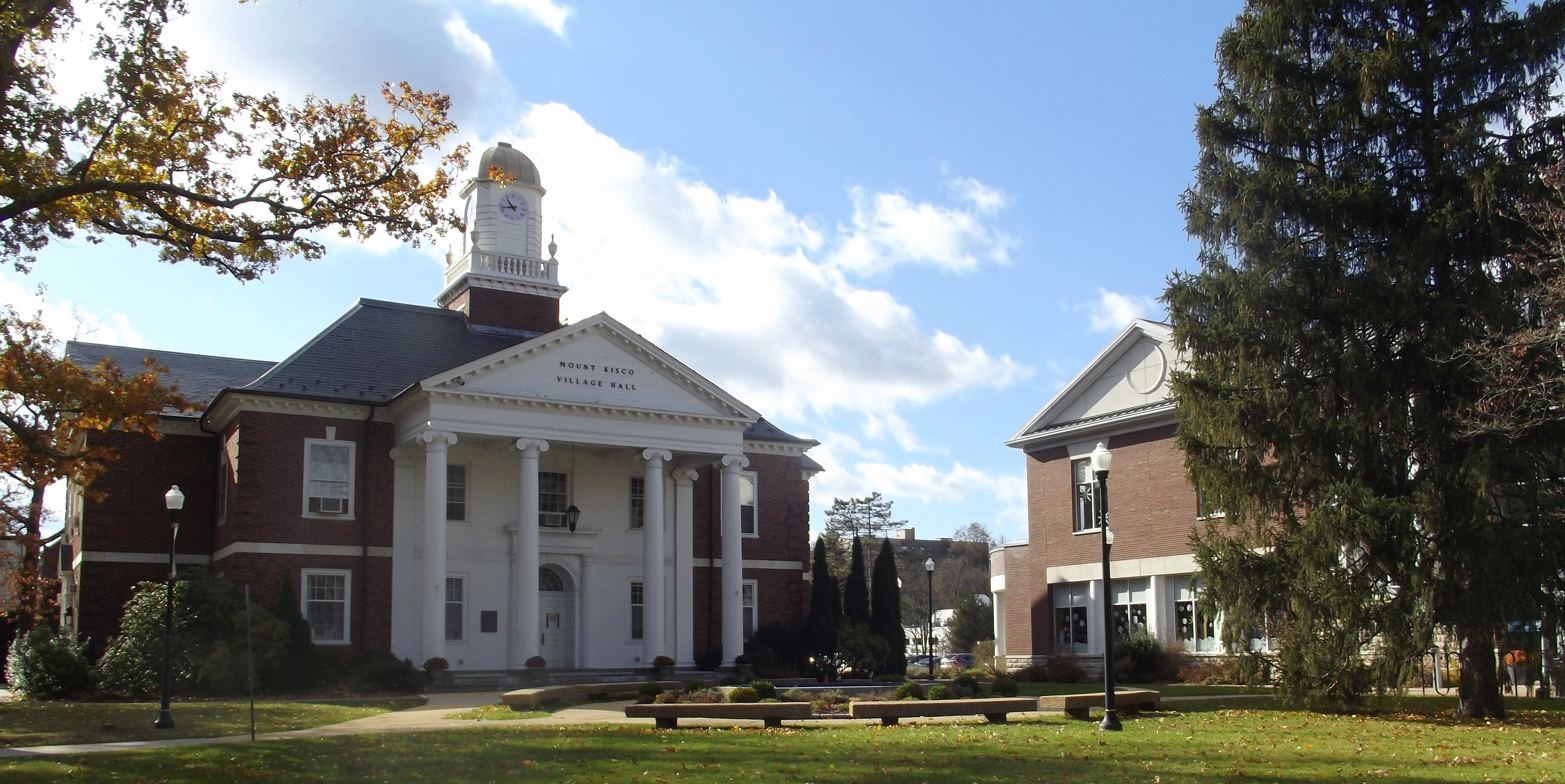
Municipal Building and Post Office, Mt. Kisco, New York (completed 1932).
