= Mount Kisco Municipal Complex =

- U.S. National Register of Historic Places
- U.S. Historic district
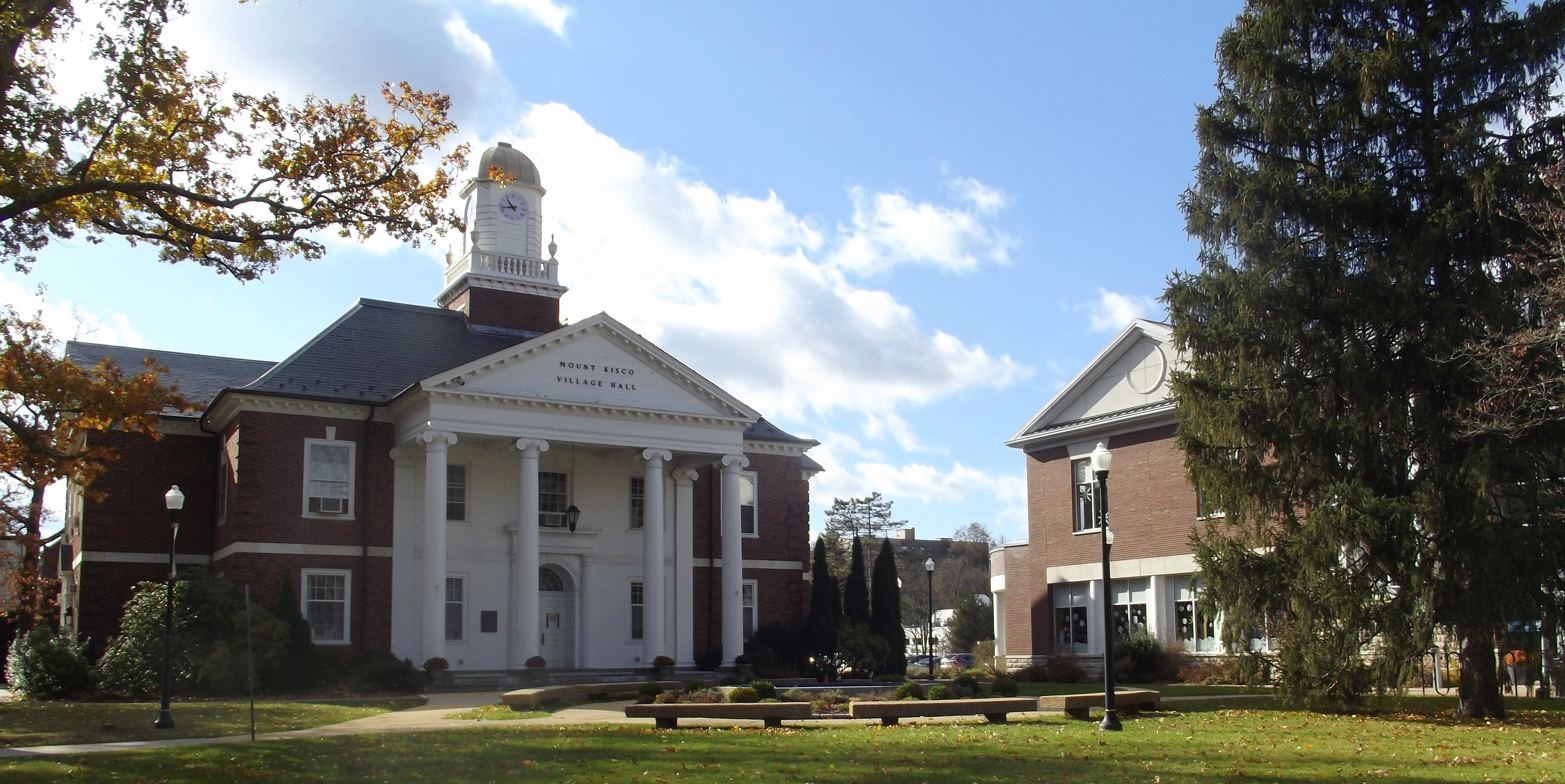

- Location within New York Location within the United States
- Location: 100-120 Main St., Mount Kisco, New York
- Coordinates: 41°12′9″N 73°43′37″W
- Built: 1932
- Architect: Mott B. Schmidt; O'Brien & Klikel
- Architectural style: Colonial Revival
- NRHP reference No.: 97000116
- Added to NRHP: March 9, 1997

Mount Kisco Municipal Complex is a national historic district located at Mount Kisco, Westchester County, New York. The district contains two contributing buildings; the Mount Kisco Town and Village Hall (1932) and the United States Post Office (1936). Both are in the Colonial Revival style. The Town and Village Hall is a 2-story, cruciform plan brick building on a limestone foundation and topped by a slate-covered hipped and gable roof. It features an octagonal clock tower. The Village Library formerly occupied the second floor until a separate, adjacent building was constructed in the 1960s. The first floor formerly housed the police station and a small jail. The Post Office is a 1 1/2-story brick building set on a limestone foundation and topped by a slate shingle clad gable roof. It consists of a central section flanked by 1-story wings, with a large 2-story rear wing. The interior features murals depicting the history of Mount Kisco executed by artist Thomas Donnelly in 1936.

It was added to the National Register of Historic Places in 1997.

In 2017, the Mount Kisco Public Library was renamed the Henry V. Kensing Memorial Library in honor of the town's former mayor.

== See also ==
- National Register of Historic Places listings in northern Westchester County, New York
