= SS George E. Merrick =

Liberty ship of WWII

History

United States
- Name: George E. Merrick
- Namesake: George E. Merrick
- Owner: War Shipping Administration (WSA)
- Operator: United States Lines
- Ordered: as type (EC2-S-C1) hull, MC hull 2476
- Awarded: 23 April 1943
- Builder: St. Johns River Shipbuilding Company, Jacksonville, Florida
- Cost: $1,096,218
- Yard number: 40
- Way number: 4
- Laid down: 20 March 1944
- Launched: 4 May 1944
- Sponsored by: Mrs. Louis V. Tallamy
- Completed: 21 May 1944
- Identification: Call sign: WKZZ
- Fate: Laid up in the, Hudson River Reserve Fleet, Jones Point, New York, 22 April 1948; Sold for commercial use, 25 January 1951, removed from fleet, 6 March 1951

United States
- Name: Saxon
- Owner: Saxon Steamship Co.
- Fate: Sold, 1956

United States
- Name: Saxon
- Owner: Aspin Steamship Co.
- Operator: Isbrandtsen and Co.
- Fate: Sold, 1961

Greece
- Name: Panagia Kounistra
- Owner: Guiadoro Cia. Nav.
- Operator: Zaharias Sitinas
- Fate: Scrapped, 1972

General characteristics
- Class & type: Liberty ship; type EC2-S-C1, standard
- Tonnage: 10,865 LT DWT; 7,176 GRT
- Displacement: 3,380 long tons (3,434 t) (light); 14,245 long tons (14,474 t) (max)
- Length: 441 feet 6 inches (135 m) oa; 416 feet (127 m) pp; 427 feet (130 m) lwl
- Beam: 57 feet (17 m)
- Draft: 27 ft 9.25 in (8.4646 m)
- Installed power: 2 × Oil fired 450 °F (232 °C) boilers, operating at 220 psi (1,500 kPa); 2,500 hp (1,900 kW)
- Propulsion: 1 × triple-expansion steam engine, (manufactured by Filer and Stowell, Milwaukee, Wisconsin); 1 × screw propeller
- Speed: 11.5 knots (21.3 km/h; 13.2 mph)
- Capacity: 562,608 cubic feet (15,931 m^{3}) (grain); 499,573 cubic feet (14,146 m^{3}) (bale)
- Complement: 38–62 USMM; 21–40 USNAG
- Armament: Varied by ship; Bow-mounted 3-inch (76 mm)/50-caliber gun; Stern-mounted 4-inch (102 mm)/50-caliber gun; 2–8 × single 20-millimeter (0.79 in) Oerlikon anti-aircraft (AA) cannons and/or, 2–8 × 37-millimeter (1.46 in) M1 AA guns

SS George E. Merrick was a Liberty ship built in the United States during World War II. She was named after George E. Merrick, a real estate developer who is best known as the planner and builder of the city of Coral Gables, Florida, in the 1920s, one of the first planned communities in the United States.

== Construction ==
George E. Merrick was laid down on 20 March 1944, under a Maritime Commission (MARCOM) contract, MC hull 2476, by the St. Johns River Shipbuilding Company, Jacksonville, Florida; she was sponsored by Mrs. Louis V. Tallamy, the president of the Ladies Auxiliary for the Harvey Seeds American Legion Post, Miami, and was launched on 4 May 1944.

== History ==
She was allocated to the United States Lines, on 21 May 1944. On 2 December 1947, she was laid up in the Hudson River Reserve Fleet, Jones Point, New York. She was sold for commercial use, 25 January 1951, to Saxson Steamship Co. She was removed from the fleet on 6 March 1951. George E. Merrick was renamed Saxon and remained flagged in the US. Saxon was sold to the Aspin Steamship Co. in 1956. In 1961, she was sold to Guiadoro Cia. Nav., and renamed Panaiga Kounistra and reflagged in Greece. She was scrapped in 1972, in Istanbul.

== Bibliography ==
- "St. John's River Shipbuilding, Jacksonville FL". www.ShipbuildingHistory.com. 16 October 2010.
- Maritime Administration. "George E. Merrick". Ship History Database Vessel Status Card. U.S. Department of Transportation, Maritime Administration.
- Davies, James (May 2004). "Specifications (As-Built)" (PDF). p. 23.
- "SS George E. Merrick".
