= Frank Morse Button =

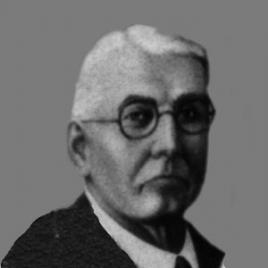
- Born: August 14, 1866; Brandon, Vermont, U.S.
- Died: August 3, 1938 (aged 71); Miami, Florida, U.S.
- Education: University of Vermont
- Occupation: Landscape architect

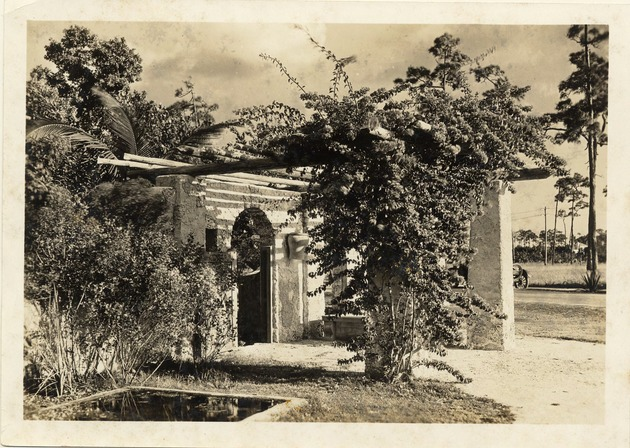
Ponce de Leon Plaza, Coral Gables, Florida, designed by Frank Button. http://dpanther.fiu.edu/dpService/dpPurlService/purl/FI12041014/00001

Frank Morse Button (August 14, 1866 – August 3, 1938) was an American landscape architect, known for his impactful designs in the City of Coral Gables, Florida. He was born in Brandon, Vermont and attended the University of Vermont where he received a degree in civil engineering in 1887. Button was a part of the Army Corps of Engineers from 1889 to 1899, where he worked on various projects, including the 1893 Chicago Columbian Exposition where he was responsible for laying the pilings for the facsimile battleship Illinois. In 1903, he joined the landscape firm of Ossian Cole Simonds, working on projects such as the Charles Deering estate at Buena Vista and Lincoln Park in Chicago.

He was the first registered landscape architect in Florida and named a Fellow of the American Society of Landscape Architects in 1910.

After the death of his wife, Button and his daughter moved to Florida, where he was hired by Coral Gables founder George Merrick as the master planner for Coral Gables at a fee of $1 an acre, and completed the first comprehensive map of the city in July 1921. His design for the city included parkways, canals, gardens, fountains, and recreational facilities and incorporated the use of native plants alongside tropical and imported specimens.

Button also directed the landscaping of all the streets, plazas, parkways and parks in Coral Gables, and his close participation in field-work led to his untimely death in 1938 when he fell into the path of a truck while supervising the planting of Ficus trees in the median of Bird Road.

The Coral Gables Historic Preservation Board created a 2-sided historic bronze marker honoring Frank Button for his significant role in the creation of the City of Coral Gables. It was placed in Alhambra Plaza at the intersection of Alhambra Circle and Granada Boulevard and unveiled at the City's annual Arbor Day Celebration on April 29, 2016.
