= French Provincial architecture =

Revivalist architectural style

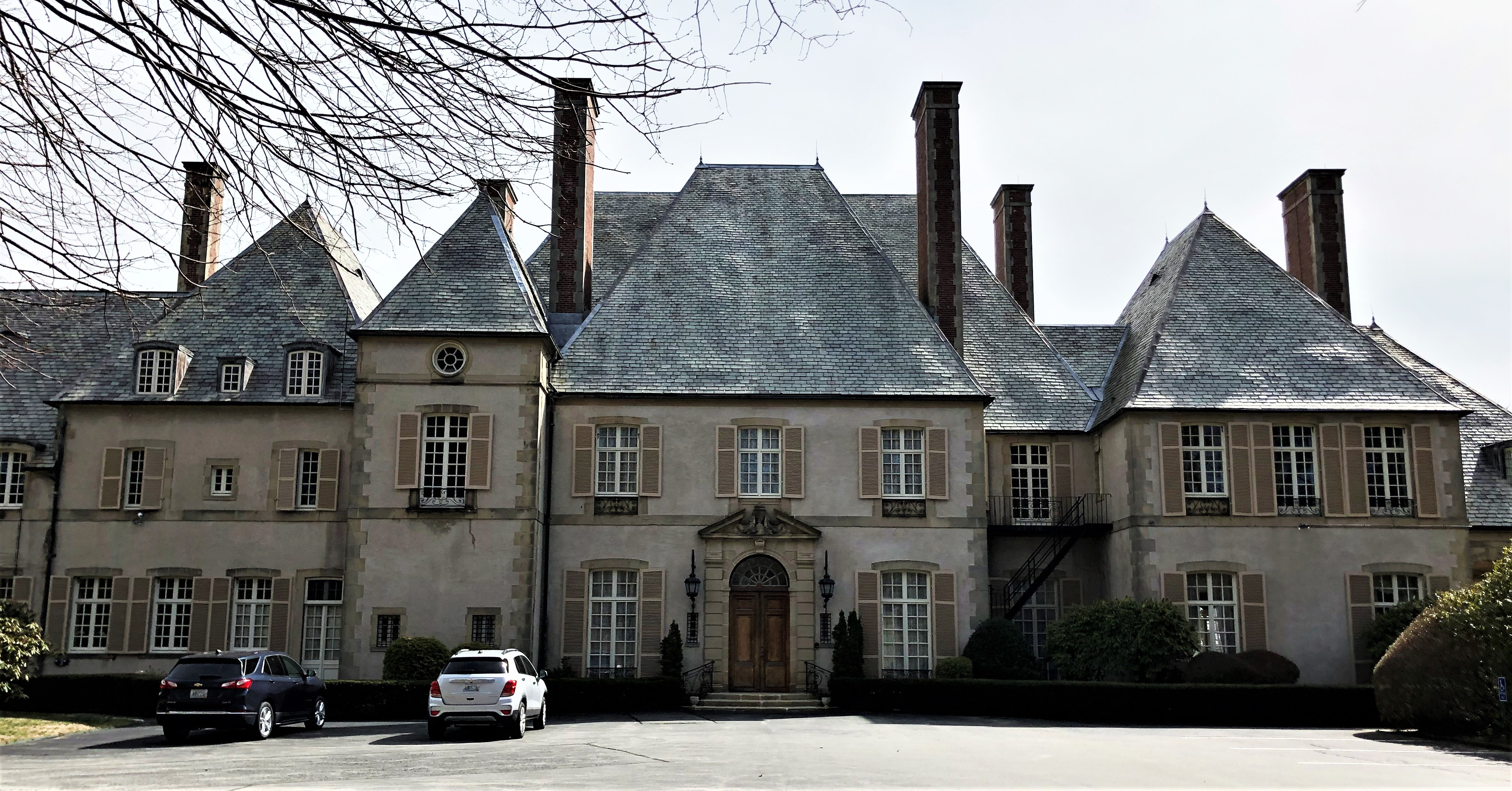
Glen Manor House in Rhode Island, is an example of French Provincial Architecture

French Provincial architecture, also known as French Eclectic architecture, is a revivalist architectural style based on manor houses or chateaux homes which were built by French aristocrats beginning in the 1600s. The homes are characterized by arched doorways and symmetrically placed elements. They are usually two stories tall with steep hipped roofs. The design came to the United States after American servicemen returned from fighting in France during World War I.

== History ==
The houses which inspired French Provincial architecture were found in rural France from the 1600s. The architecture was inspired by the stylings of Versailles during the reign of King Louis XIV. Homes found in Normandy, France are examples of the style. The first homes to be designed in the style were manor houses. French nobles built chateaus or manor houses with steep hipped roofs and an overall formal appearance. Architectural journals also refer to the style as French Eclectic architecture.

=== United States ===
In the United States, the style became popular following World War I. American soldiers admired the architecture of rural France, and when they returned from the war, they built homes in the style. The style remained popular though the 1920s. By 1932, nearly one in three homes which appeared in the annual country house issue of the American magazine Architectural Record had French Provincial design elements. The style fell out of favor in the 1930s, but had a resurgence in the 1960s.

Architect Frank J. Forster promoted the style in the United States. He was recognized by his peers as a master of French Provincial architecture in 1927, 1928, and 1929.

== Design ==
Elements of French Provincial architecture include narrow tall windows with shutters, slate roof, copper gutters and symmetrically placed chimneys. The homes usually feature a rectangular floor plan. Exterior is usually brick or stucco with symmetrically placed exterior components. The design of doors is rectangular with an arched opening. The French provincial homes are two stories tall. The original modest designs ranged from modest farmhouses to wealthy aristocrat country estates.
