= Arva Moore Parks McCabe =

American historian (1939–2020)

Arva Moore Parks McCabe (born Arva Moore; January 19, 1939 – May 10, 2020) was a historian, author and preservationist in Miami, Florida.

== Career ==
A University of Florida alumna (1960), she was inducted into the Florida Women's Hall of Fame (1986) and was honored as Coral Gables' "Citizen of the Year".

She worked to preserve Harry Truman’s Little White House and the Biltmore Hotel. She ran the Coral Gables Museum and served as president of HistoryMiami, chaired Coral Gables' Historic Preservation Board, and the Florida Humanities Council. She produced films on Miami and Coconut Grove (earning an Emmy Award from the Florida Academy of Television Arts and Sciences) and chaired the Florida Endowment for the Humanities in 1982-83.

== Notable works ==
She authored and co-authored numerous books on the history of Coral Gables and Miami that have helped shape the scholarly understanding of their respective backgrounds and evolution in the 21st century.

Notably, she was also hired by high-profile Coral Gables developer Ralph Sanchez as a historical consultant for his Old Spanish Village development project.

Arva McCabe is credited with expanding and deepening Sanchez' interest and appreciation for George Merrick, which helped shape the project and resulted her the 2006 book George Merrick's Coral Gables: Where 'Castles in Spain' Are Made Real, published by Sanchez' Ponce Circle Developers firm. Other books she wrote include:

- Miami, The Magic City ISBN 097176493X
- Miami - Now and Then
- Miami: The American Crossroad
- Images of America: Coconut Grove ISBN 0738586277
- George Merrick, Son of the South Wind: Visionary Creator of Coral Gables
- Legendary Locals of Greater Miami
- The Forgotten Frontier: Florida Through the Lens of Ralph Middleton Munroe
