= Frank J. Forster =

American architect from New York City

Frank Joseph Forster (1886 – March 4, 1948) was an American architect who designed homes in the style of French Provincial architecture during the early 20th century. He was also the author of two books about the French Provincial architecture style.

== Early life ==
Forster was born in New York City in 1886. From 1903 to 1908 he studied architecture at Cooper Union college in New York City. He went to Europe in 1908 and upon his return he began work as a draftsman for New York Architect Edward King.

== Career ==
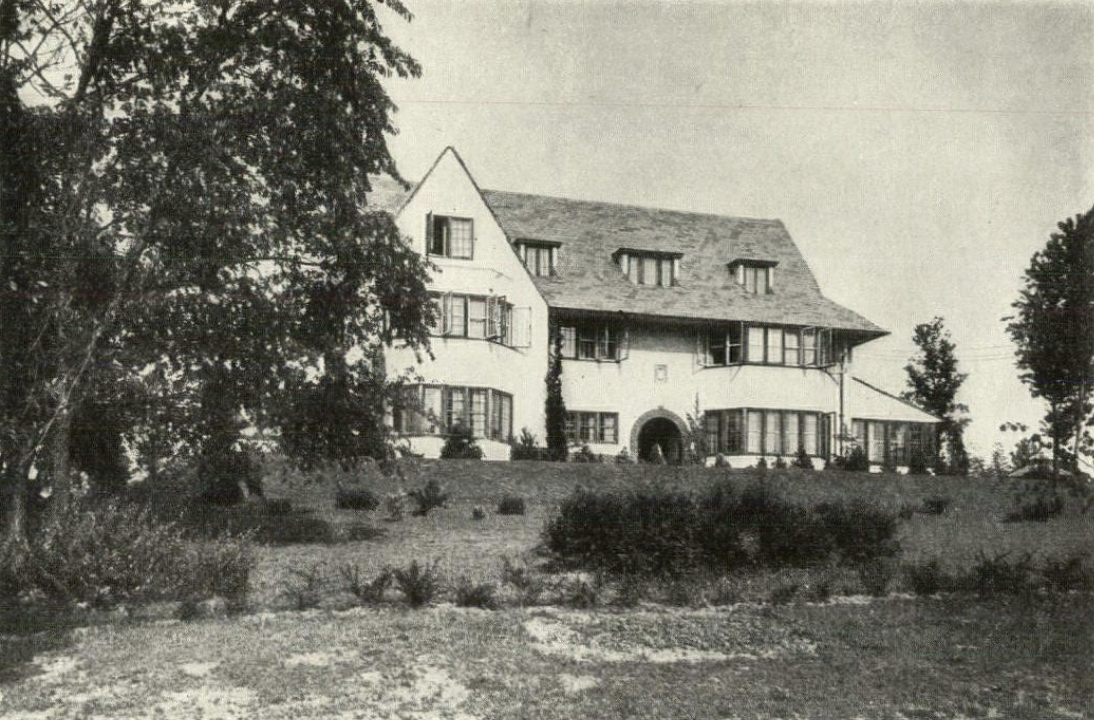
John B .Van Haelen residence Frank J. Forster New York (1919)

He was considered an expert in the creation of French Provincial architecture. Many of the homes he designed are located in the New York Metropolitan area. He was from New York but he also built homes in Fairfield County, Connecticut, Long Island's north shore and along the Hudson River. His architectural designs recreating French chateaus and English Tudor homes often featuring turrets. He built several homes in Connecticut including a home in Greenwich, Connecticut that was home of singer Diana Ross.

In 1927 and 1929 Forster won the Architectural League Medal for Domestic architecture. In 1933 he won the Better Homes Medal for his residential designs.

== Personal life ==
He was married to Mary Viola Tackleson. Forster and his wife Mary purchased 92 acres in Connecticut and built their home in what is now Forster Pond State Park which is also known as Chatfield Hollow State Park in Killingworth, Connecticut. He died at his home in Killingworth on March 4, 1948 after an illness.

== Bibliography ==
- Forster, Frank J. (1931). Country Houses [The Work of Frank J. Forster]. New York city: William Helburn, Inc.
- Forster, Frank J. (1931). Provincial Architecture of Northern France [The Tuileries Brochures, Vol. III, No. 3]. University of Michigan: Ludowici-Celadon Company.
