= George E. Merrick =

American politician

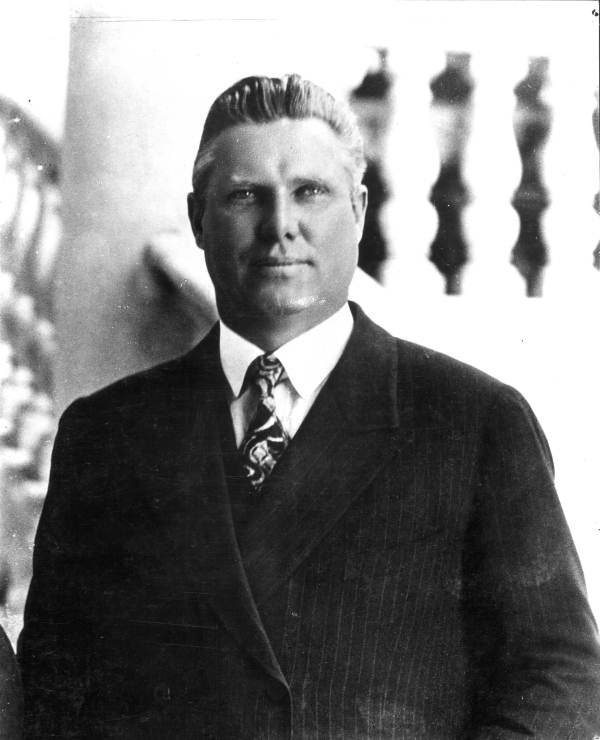
- George E. Merrick
- Born: June 3, 1886; Springdale, Pennsylvania, U.S.
- Died: March 26, 1942 (aged 55); Miami, Florida U.S.
- Spouse: Eunice Isabella Peacock
- Parent(s): Solomon Greasley Merrick (1859-1911); Althea Fink Merrick (1859-1937)
- Relatives: Ethel Merrick (sister)

George Edgar Merrick (June 3, 1886 – March 26, 1942) was an American real estate developer who is best known as the planner and builder of the city of Coral Gables, Florida in the 1920s, one of the first major planned communities in the United States.

== Early life and education ==
Merrick was born in Springdale, Pennsylvania, a suburb of Pittsburgh, on June 3, 1886. His father, Solomon G. Merrick, was a Congregationalist minister. The family moved to Miami from Duxbury, Massachusetts in 1898 when George was 12 years old. He attended Rollins College in Winter Park, Florida. After graduating, Merrick moved to New York to study law until 1911 when his father's death prompted him to return to Miami.

== Career ==
In October, 1915, Merrick was appointed by the governor of Florida to replace F.A. Bryant as the county commissioner in District 1. He spent the next 15 months on the commission championing the building of roads in south Florida, including major arteries that would later serve to connect his well-planned community of Coral Gables, Florida with the fast-growing city of Miami. Along with Commissioner Edward DeVere Burr of Arch Creek, the two men ushered the vast majority of all road construction projects in Dade County, including the construction of South Dixie Highway (US 1), the Tamiami Trail across the Everglades, the County Causeway to Miami Beach, Ingraham Highway (later known as Old Cutler Road) along the coast, the Miami Canal Highway and many others. These improvements allowed the population of Greater Miami to quadruple from 1915 to 1921, transforming a pioneer territory into a burgeoning metropolis.

=== Coral Gables ===
Beginning in 1922, on 3,000 acres (12 km²) of citrus groves and land covered in pine trees which his father had left him, Merrick began carving out a town along the lines of the City Beautiful movement. He designed the new town in great detail, featuring wide, tree-lined boulevards, delicate bridges and sedate urban golf courses. Merrick's secret was his passionate devotion to aesthetics. He wanted to focus on the finest details of this town not just on the major ideas behind the project. As a result, his team included men of diverse background, such as Denman Fink, an artist, H. George Fink and Phineas Paist, both architects, and Frank Button, a landscape artist. Another important aspect of the planning that was very important to Merrick was zoning divisions. Merrick wanted areas of the community to be set aside as commercial, residential or recreational and he wanted the divisions to be clear.

In three years, Merrick spent over $20 million to build a thousand Mediterranean style houses, which complemented the Biltmore Hotel, the country clubs, and the other community buildings that Merrick had also designed and overseen the construction of.

In an interview with The New York Times in March 1925, Merrick said, "Just how I came to utilize the Spanish type of architecture in Coral Gables, I can hardly say, except that it always seemed to me to be the only way houses should be built down there in those tropical surroundings."

Once he was done building the core of Coral Gables, Merrick decided to branch out creatively. Many people who did not like the Mediterranean Revival Style rejected Coral Gables because of its lack of variety. Merrick therefore decided to design small communities, or villages, within Coral Gables with different international influences.

=== University of Miami ===
Merrick is credited with the establishment of the University of Miami in Coral Gables, Florida, in 1925, with a donation of 600 acres (2.4 km^{2}) of land and a pledged contribution of $5 million to the university. The following year, just weeks before the start of the inaugural school year, a devastating hurricane on September 17–18, 1926, followed by the Great Depression, ended Merrick's dreams of further developing Coral Gables.

Merrick later fell into heavy debt. In 1928, he was asked to leave the Coral Gables Commission. He then left Coral Gables and moved to Upper Matecumbe Key, where he opened Caribee Club with his wife; it was not far from Long Key Fishing Camp, an upscale fishing resort on nearby Long Key. In 1935, the monstrous Labor Day Hurricane, called the "Storm of the Century", destroyed almost everything on the Middle Keys, including Merrick's Caribee Club, which was never rebuilt. Merrick returned to Coral Gables only when he became the postmaster for the county two years before his death.

Merrick's former home in Coral Gables, Coral Gables House, is maintained as a historic house museum. The Solomon G. Merrick Building at the University of Miami at Coral Gables was built in honor of Merrick's father, who was a Congregational minister and abolitionist.

== Poetry ==
In 1920, Merrick published a book of poetry, Songs of the Wind on a Southern Shore, and other Poems of Florida, with The Four Seas Publishing Company.

== Controversy ==
In May 2021, the University of Miami announced the parking structure on Merrick Drive would no longer be referred to by George Merrick's name, but that the Solomon G. Merrick Building named in honor of George Merrick’s father would remain, and "as for the roadway, the renaming of George E. Merrick Street goes beyond the purview of the Board of Trustees." The university's decision was a response to a petition created by alumni and students in the wake of Black Lives Matter protests, titled "Rename University of Miami facilities with a racist history". The petition alleged George Merrick "boldly held, and acted upon, racist segregationist beliefs throughout his life." The petition did not mention that George Merrick faced criticism from the white community when he let the black community's housing cross over the color line, which violated the segregationist laws of the time. The petition mentioned that Merrick looked up to his father, but did not mention that his father, Solomon G. Merrick, was an abolitionist and a reverend with one of the first American Protestant denominations to take a stand against slavery in the 1850s, nor did it state that George Merrick lived in a society where segregation was legally required because of Jim Crow laws- laws which predated his birth and were still in place after his death.

In the early to mid-twentieth century, government sought to improve living conditions and public health and safety by clearing slums, with the Housing Act of 1937 defining a slum as "any area where dwellings predominate which by reason of dilapidation, over-crowding, faulty arrangement or design, lack of ventilation, light or sanitation facilities, or any combination of these factors, are detrimental to safety, health, or morals." This was relevant to Merrick, who experienced a yellow fever epidemic and forced quarantine when he was moving to South Florida as a boy. In 1937, Merrick's proposed "Negro Resettlement Plan", as part of the slum clearance laws promulgated under President Franklin D. Roosevelt, would have relocated Black residents to new locations outside of their current segregated housing in Miami, but the resettlement plan was never implemented. Merrick recognized that the living conditions for the Black community were unfair, and he advocated for the Black community's access to water, their ability to grow and access their own fresh food from their own property, and their right to larger and beautiful homes. When beachfront land was being bought up, Merrick argued that everyone should have the right to beach access, including middle to lower income whites and the Black community. Due to Jim Crow laws, beaches were segregated, but Merrick believed that rather than deny the Black community complete beach access, they should have their own "great Bay beach" and park and that it should be forever preserved for the Black community.

In his 1937 speech to the Miami Realty Board, Merrick lamented the unfair living conditions of the Black community, recalling peddling vegetables when he was young and stating "[i]f I had anything in the wagon left over, I would go over into Negro town and get rid of it. Sadly, but truly, that is the picture of how we have always treated our Negro population. If anything is left over, or anything we do not want, then the Negroes get that. Today one third of our present population is Negro. When we will have a million people, we will have at least a fourth of a million Negroes. Today this third of our present citizenry are effectively denied water access and water use. Now collectively, as well as individually, we cannot receive fairness, unless we give fairness. It is proposed—for Miami at least, that this unfair condition be remedied. It is proposed to give fairness to this deserving one third of our citizenry. It is proposed that at a proper point on this proposed fifty mile water Loop, that a great Bay beach be established and forever preserved for Negro use. And that similarly, on the ocean side of the Loop that similar advantages be established and preferably in one whole little island facing on the Gulf Stream, which could ideally be made there for them an ocean and Gulf Stream park."

The petition to remove Merrick's name from the University of Miami campus claimed that leading up to public votes on George Merrick’s aforementioned Negro Resettlement Plan, the use of racist advertisement materials was "fairly wide-spread throughout Miami and the surrounding areas." The petition then cited an image of a slum clearance ad from the 1950s, years after Merrick’s death.

Published as part of Vizcaya Museum and Gardens, "Black Voices", by historian and founder of The Black Archives Dr. Dorothy Fields, noted the significance of Merrick's admiration of the Bahamian community's impact and inspiration. Merrick wrote a series of stories he titled “Men of the Magical Isles”, honoring the Bahamian laborers he worked with. When Nellie Powers, a Black woman in the community, decided to open a private school to educate Black children, Merrick, along with a biracial board, donated to the cause. Up until that point, "Miami had never seen such an inter-racial effort". Merrick also purchased land to give to the Bahamian laborers to live on, this land later becoming the MacFarlane District.

The only structure on the University of Miami campus named after George Merrick is the Merrick Garage, which the university and students also refer to as the Brown Garage. The Solomon G. Merrick Building, named after George Merrick's father, is sometimes referred to as simply the Merrick Building. As of June 2022, the University of Miami has retained the name "Merrick Garage" on all directional signs and maps.

== Personal life ==
On February 5, 1916, Merrick married the daughter of Coconut Grove pioneers, R.A.S. Peacock and Lilian Irene Frow, Eunice Isabella Peacock, a life-long Christian Scientist. Merrick built a home for his bride, called Poinciana Place, located at 937 Coral Way, in Coral Gables.

== Legacy and honors ==
- In 1927, Merrick was awarded the Order of Isabella the Catholic by King Alfonso XIII of Spain for his support of Spanish culture in Coral Gables.
- A year after Merrick's death, in 1943, the World War II Liberty Ship SS George E. Merrick was named in his honor.
- In 2006, the Coral Gables Garden Club commissioned a statue of George Merrick to be placed in front of City Hall. The bronze statue was crafted by American sculptor, William Beckwith. Architect Rocco Ceo designed the pedestal for the statue and surrounding bench, which were constructed from coral rock.
- On June 3, 2021, the City of Coral Gables celebrated its inaugural "Founder's Day Ceremony" at City Hall, marking the 135th anniversary of George Merrick's birthday to commemorate his legacy.
- The cover of the July 2021 edition of Coral Gables Magazine features a watercolor painting honoring Merrick by artist Carlos Garcia-Barbon; the painting depicts the bronze George Merrick statue in front of City Hall.
- In 2022, the City of Coral Gables enacted a resolution recognizing June 3 as "Founder's Day in Coral Gables" honoring Merrick on the anniversary of his birthday.

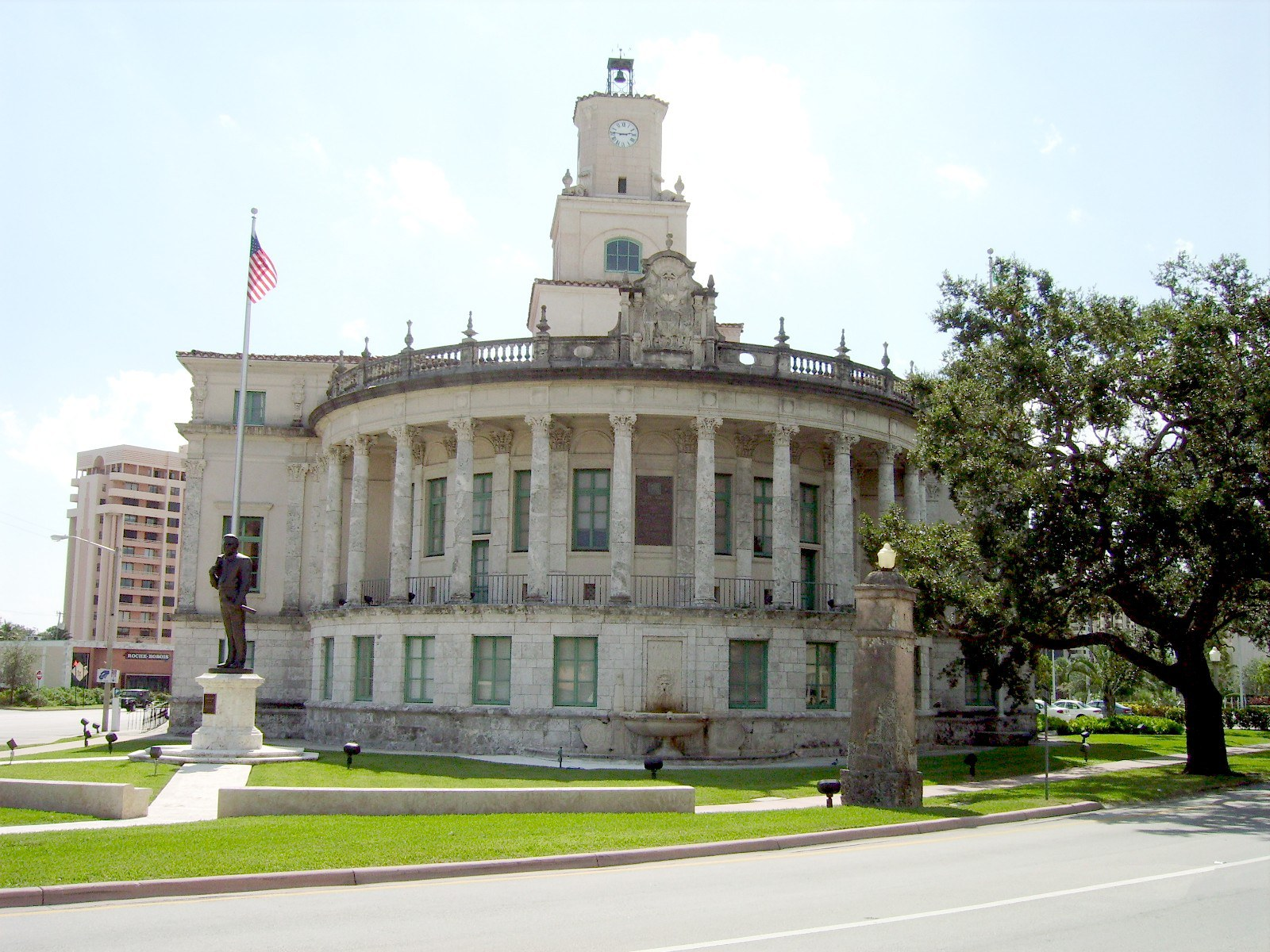
Coral Gables City Hall with its statue of Merrick.

== In popular culture ==
Merrick appears as a major supporting character in the 2014 point and click adventure A Golden Wake.

In 2023, a play called “The Placemaker Poet”, starring Charles Sothers, explored the life and legacy of Coral Gables’ visionary developer, George E. Merrick.
