= Eau Gallie Historic District =

Historic district in Florida

Coordinates: 28.129961°N 80.6301374°W

The Eau Gallie Historic District is a historic district in Eau Gallie, Florida. It contains several old buildings. It also contains the Eau Gallie Arts District.

== Advent Christian Church ==
Advent Christian Church
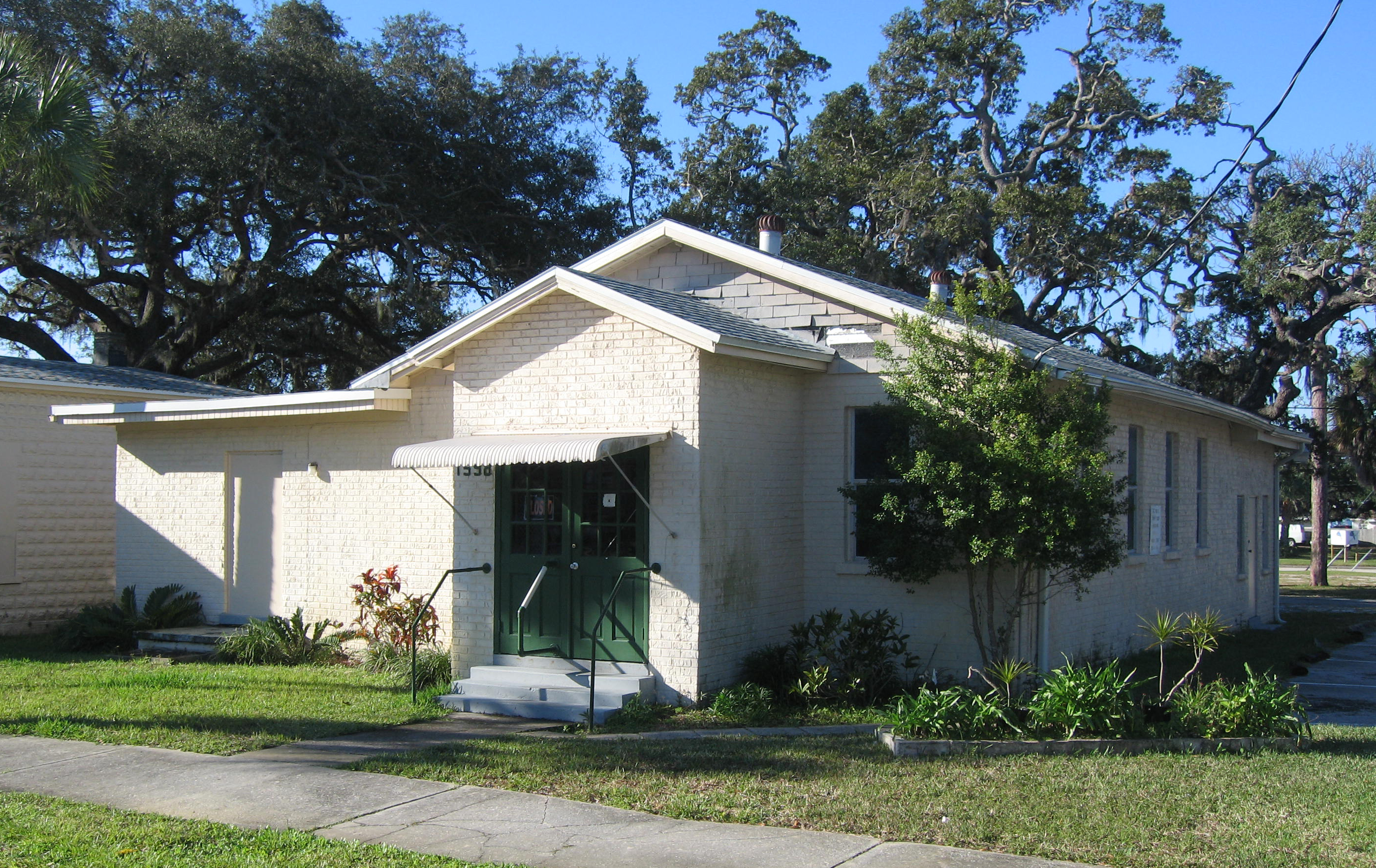
- Advent Christian Church

Religion
- Rite: Adventism

Location
- Location: 1598 Highland Avenue
- Interactive map of Advent Christian Church

Architecture
- Completed: 1914
- Materials: Brick

The Advent Christian Church is a U.S. church building located at 1598 Highland Avenue, Eau Gallie, Florida. The original building was constructed in 1914 and a new building was constructed between 1946 and 1948 using a majority of the materials from the old church. The church congregation initially formed on October 10, 1910, as the Second Advent Church. Reverend H. V. Skipper organized the church and it contained 30 members by the time the church was built, including several families of the area.

== Ginter Building ==
Ginter Building
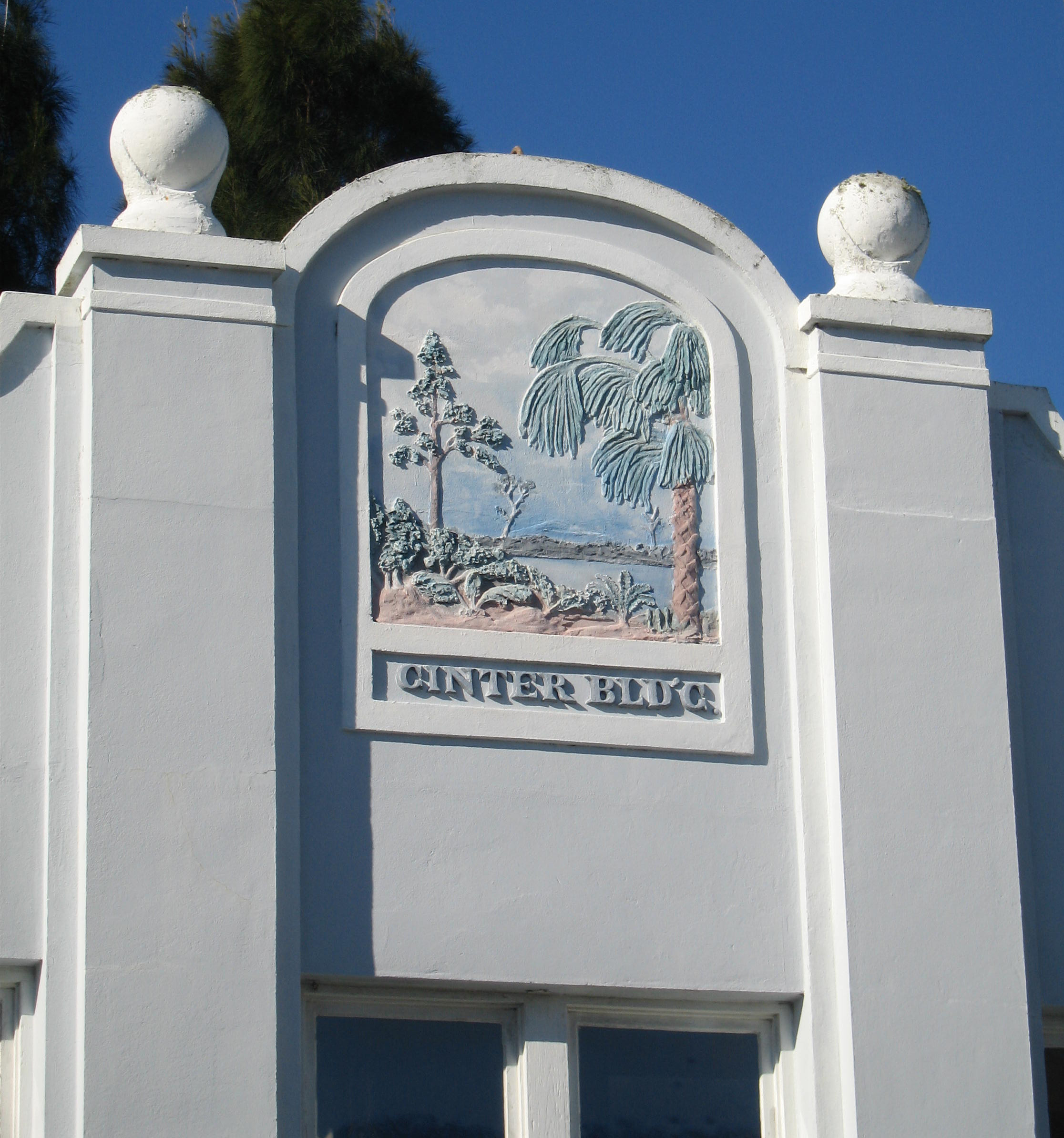
- Detail of the facade
- Interactive map of the Ginter Building area

General information
- Location: 1540 Highland Avenue
- Completed: 1926
- Client: Clifford Ginter

Technical details
- Size: 2 story

The Ginter Building is a historic U.S. building located at 1540 Highland Avenue, Eau Gallie, Florida. The building was constructed in 1926 by Clifford Ginter. Over the years, it was used as an apartment building, a rescue mission house, a store, professional offices, and a nursery school.

== Karrick Building ==
Karrick Building
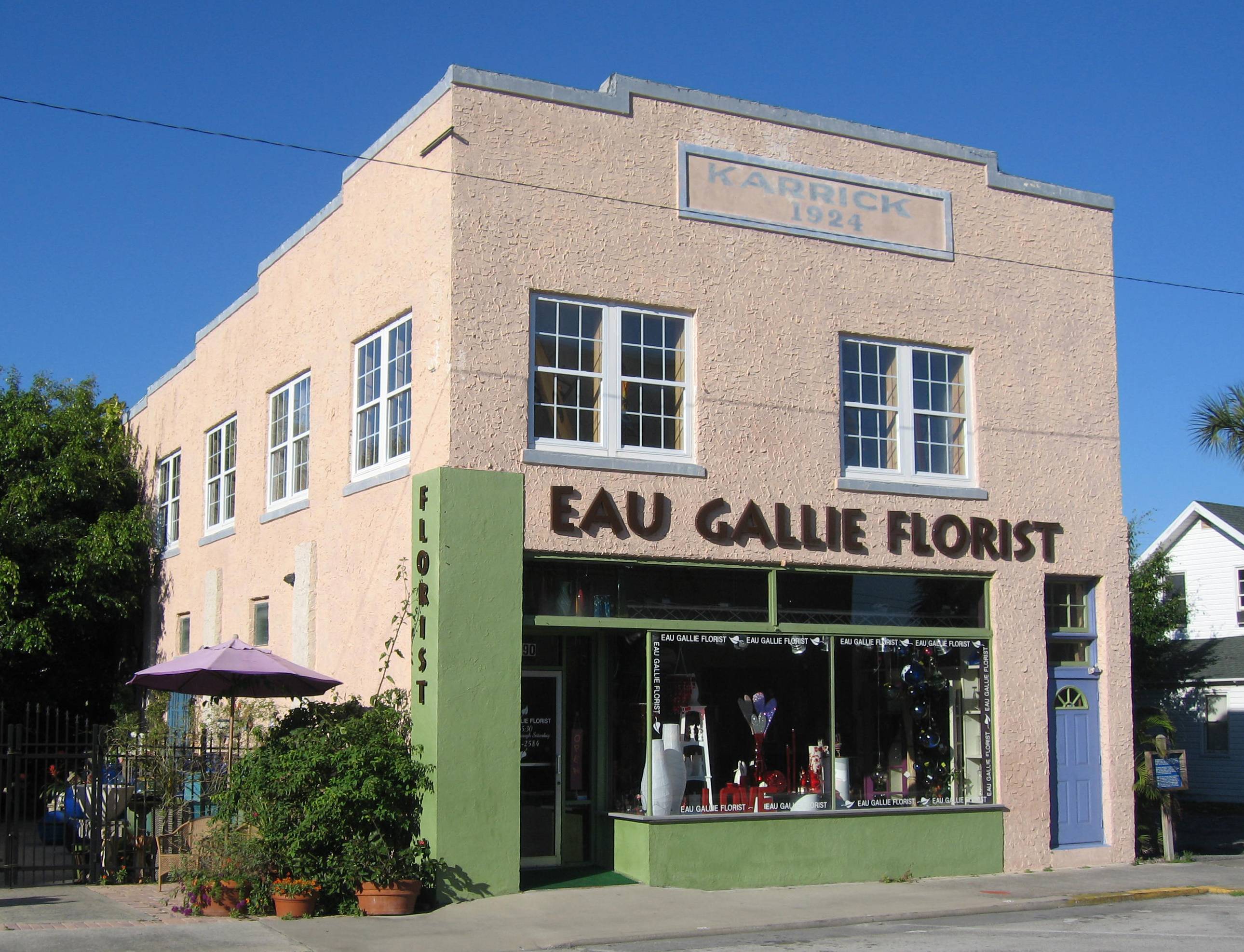
- Oblique view of the Karrick Building
- Interactive map of the Karrick Building area

General information
- Location: 1490 Highland Avenue
- Construction started: 1924

The Karrick Building is a historic U.S. building located at 1490 Highland Avenue, Eau Gallie, Florida. The building was constructed in 1924 by Jesse Karrick and it was used as a general merchandise and grocery store until 1963. Jesse Karrick was the first proprietor of the store and also served as the first fire chief of Eau Gallie.

== Old Eau Gallie Post Office ==
- See Old Eau Gallie Post Office.

== James Wadsworth Rossetter House ==
- See James Wadsworth Rossetter House

== Winchester Symphony House ==
- See Winchester Symphony House

== Roesch House ==
- See Roesch House

== Foosaner Art Museum ==
- See Foosaner Art Museum

== Houston Pioneer Cemetery ==
- See Houston Pioneer Cemetery

== Rossetter Park ==
- See Rossetter Park

== Eau Gallie Arts District ==
The Eau Gallie Arts District is now a non-accredited Florida Main Street Program, a program administered by the Division of Historical Resources at the Florida Department of State. On June 18, 2020, it received its 10th year of accreditation as a Florida Main Street America, a recognition by the National Main Street Program.
