= William Roesch (mayor) =

American politician, newspaper editor (1865-?)

William Russell Roesch

1st, 5th, 9th, 11th, and 21st Mayor of Eau Gallie, Florida
- In office 1896–1897
- Preceded by: Office established
- Succeeded by: John Caroll Houston, IV
- In office 1901–1902
- Preceded by: C. L. Taylor
- Succeeded by: W.J. Nesbett
- In office 1905–1906
- Preceded by: George Paddison
- Succeeded by: S.K. Watts
- In office 1908–1909
- Preceded by: S.K. Watts
- Succeeded by: George Paddison
- In office 1924–1925
- Preceded by: G.P. Bond
- Succeeded by: J.E. Torrence

Personal details
- Born: July 1865 Wisconsin
- Died: Eau Gallie, Florida
- Resting place: Houston Pioneer Cemetery, Eau Gallie, Florida
- Spouse(s): Ada Louise Houston (b. 1856, Volusia County, Florida; m. January 16, 1885, Brevard County, Florida; d. 1925)
- Children: Mary, Earl Leroy, William Phillip
- Occupation: Newspaper editor, postmaster

William Russell Roesch (born July 1865) was the first mayor of Eau Gallie, Florida. He served six-terms in 1896, 1901, 1905, 1908, 1924, and 1925. He was the founder and editor of the newspaper The Eau Gallie Record. He also served as postmaster.

Roesch, was the first town treasurer of Eau Gallie in 1887.

In 1913, President Woodrow Wilson appointed Roesch postmaster of Eau Gallie, and reappointed him in 1918. In 1921, he was reappointed by President Warren Harding. Roesch was also member of the local volunteer fire department.

He founded The Eau Gallie Record in 1916. He turned over the day-to-day operations of the newspaper to his son, William Phillip Roesch, when he became Eau Gallie's mayor. The Roesch family sold the Record in 1925 when both William R. Roesch's wife and his son's wife died within weeks of each other that year.

== See also ==
- Roesch House - a frame vernacular style house built in about 1901. In 1945, the house was bought by one of William Rosseter's daughters, Caroline, who donated it in 1992 to the Florida Historical Society. It was made the society's state headquarters.

Preceded by Office established	Mayor of Eau Gallie, Florida; 1896–1897	Succeeded by John Caroll Houston, IV
Preceded by C. L. Taylor	Mayor of Eau Gallie, Florida; 1901–1902	Succeeded by W.J. Nesbett
Preceded by George Paddison	Mayor of Eau Gallie, Florida; 1905–1906	Succeeded by S.K. Watts
Preceded by S.K. Watts	Mayor of Eau Gallie, Florida; 1908–1909	Succeeded by George Paddison
Preceded by G.P. Bond	Mayor of Eau Gallie, Florida; 1924–1925	Succeeded by J.E. Torrence
