= Jason Vuic =

American author

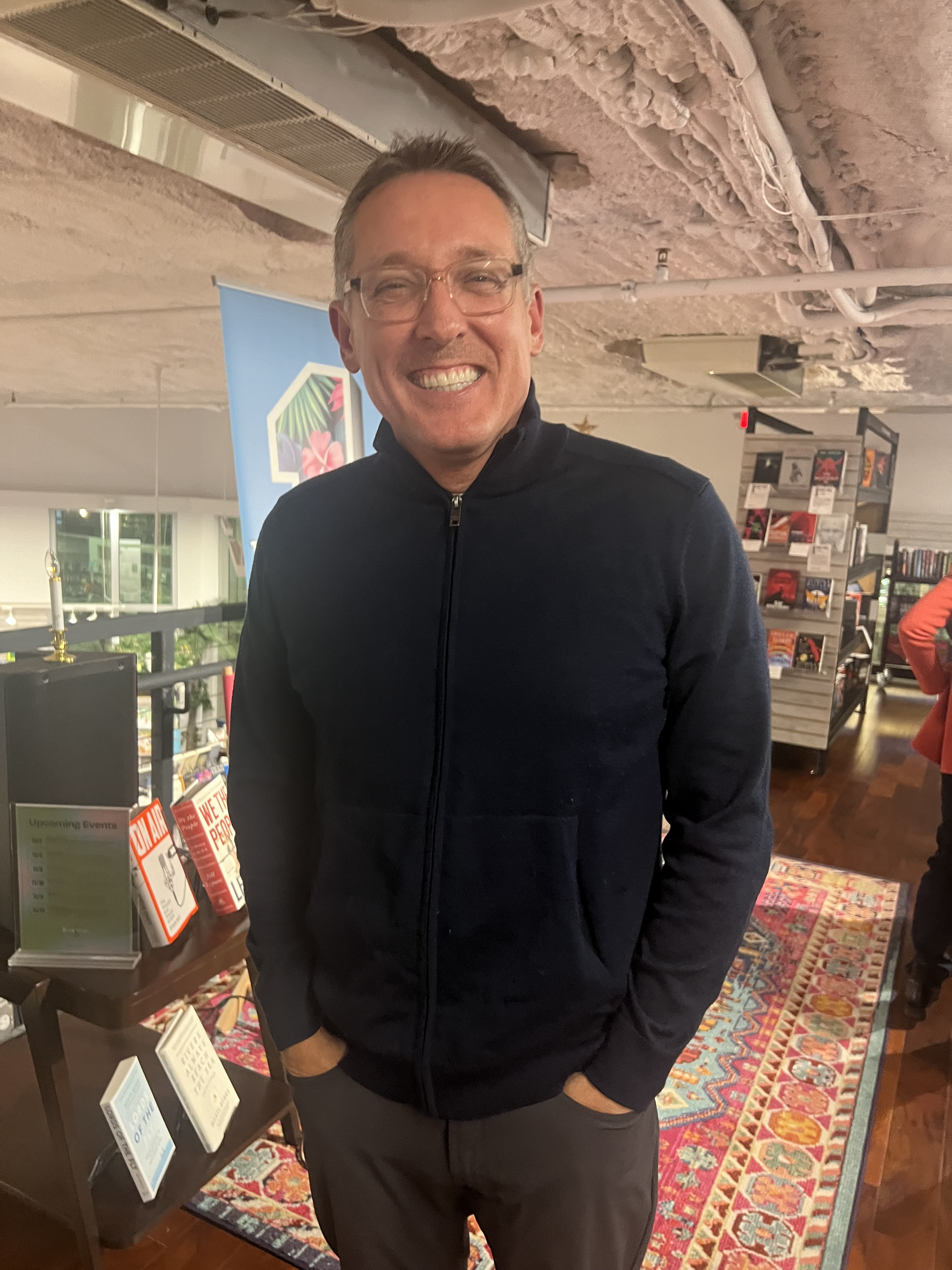
Jason Vuic in 2025

Jason Vuic is a journalist and author in the United States. He has written several books including one about Yugoslavia's Yugo car company, the 1984 Winter Olympics in Sarajevo, and several about the history of Florida. His book The Swamp Peddlers: How Lot Sellers, Land Scammers, and Retirees Built Modern Florida and Transformed the American Dream won a gold medal in 2021 from the Florida Book Awards and received the Charlton Tebeau Award from the Florida Historical Society. His book about the history of Arcadia, Florida, A Town Without Pity, was published in October 2025.

He wrote a book about the Yugo's rise and fall as a car company. He wrote a book about the Tampa Bay Buccaneers football team and their 26 straight loses. He wrote a book about property developers in Florida.

Vuic grew up in Punta Gorda, Florida. He received a doctorate in history from Indiana University. He was a Fulbright Scholar. He gave a presentation on his book Swamp Peddlars to the Historical Society of Palm Beach County in 2022. He also discussed it at Florida Southern University. He was interviewed on the Florida Humanities podcast in 2024.

== Writings ==
- The Yugo: The Rise and Fall of the Worst Car in History (2010)
- The Sarajevo Olympics; A History of the 1984 Winter Games (2015)
- The Yucks: Two Years in Tampa with the Losingest Team in NFL History (2016)
- The Swamp Peddlers: How Lot Sellers, Land Scammers, and Retirees Built Modern Florida and Transformed the American Dream UNC Press (2021), winner of the Florida Book Awards Gold Medal for Florida Nonfiction and the Florida Historical Society's Charlton Tebeau Award (Charlton Tebeau)
- A Town Without Pity: AIDS, Race & Resistance in Florida's Deep South (2025)
