= Karrick =

Karrick could refer to:

- David Karrick, an American politician
- Lewis Karrick (1890–1962), an American petroleum refinery engineer, oil shale and coal technologist, and inventor
- Karrick process, a low temperature carbonization process
- Karrick Building, a historic U.S. building located at Eau Gallie, Florida

== See also ==
- Carrick
