= Roesch House =

Coordinates: 28.128621°N 80.62613°W

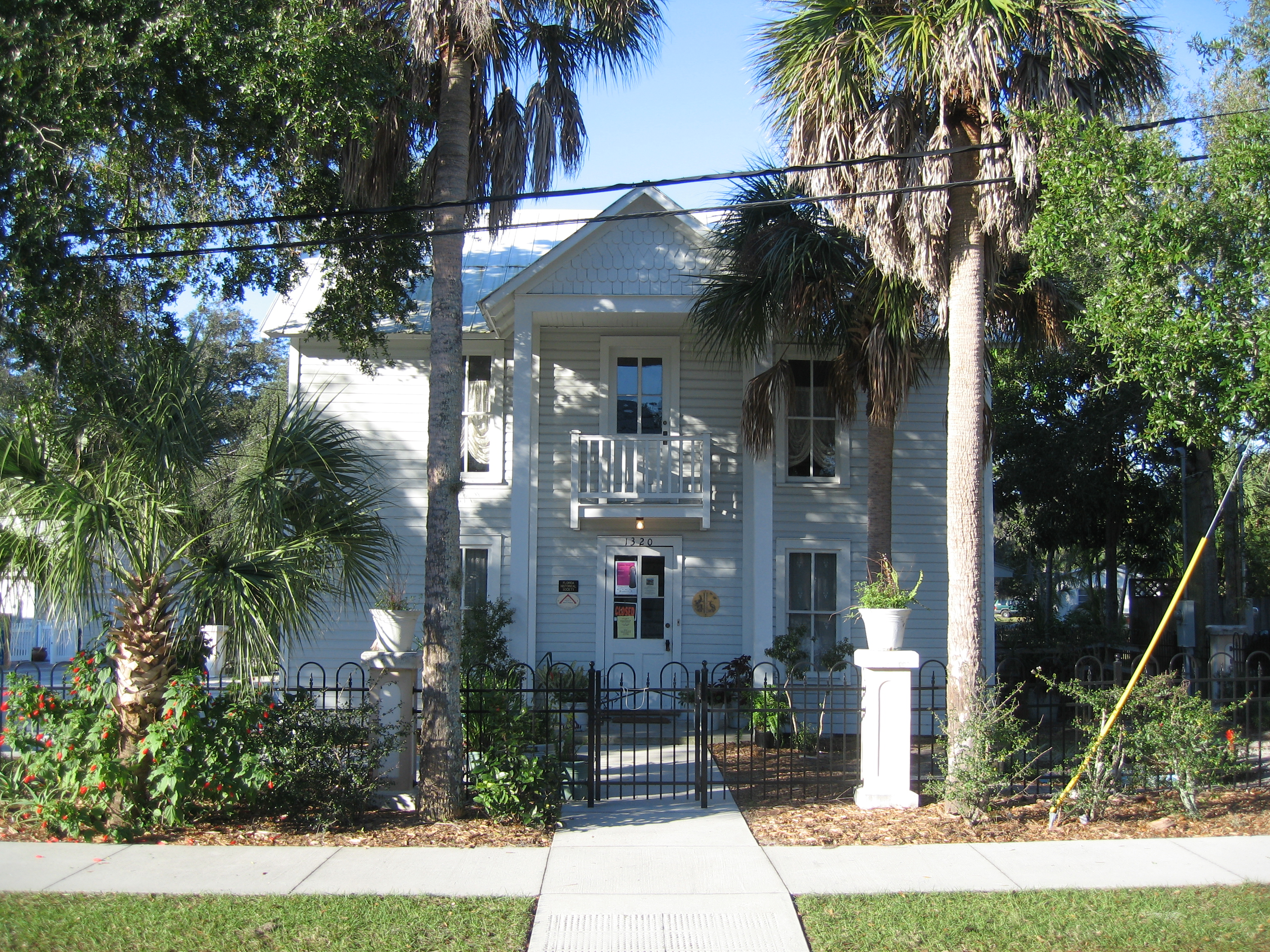
- Interactive map of the Roesch House area

General information
- Type: Wood
- Location: 1320 Highland Avenue; Melbourne, Florida
- Construction started: Circa 1898
- Completed: 1901
- Owner: William Roesch
- Governing body: The Rossetter House Foundation, Inc.

Technical details
- Floor count: 2

The Roesch House is a historic U.S. home located at 1320 Highland Avenue, Melbourne, Florida. The house is owned by The Rossetter House Foundation, Inc., managed by the Florida Historical Society, and part of the Historic Rossetter House Museum.

The house was owned by William Roesch, the first mayor of Eau Gallie, Florida.

== Gallery ==
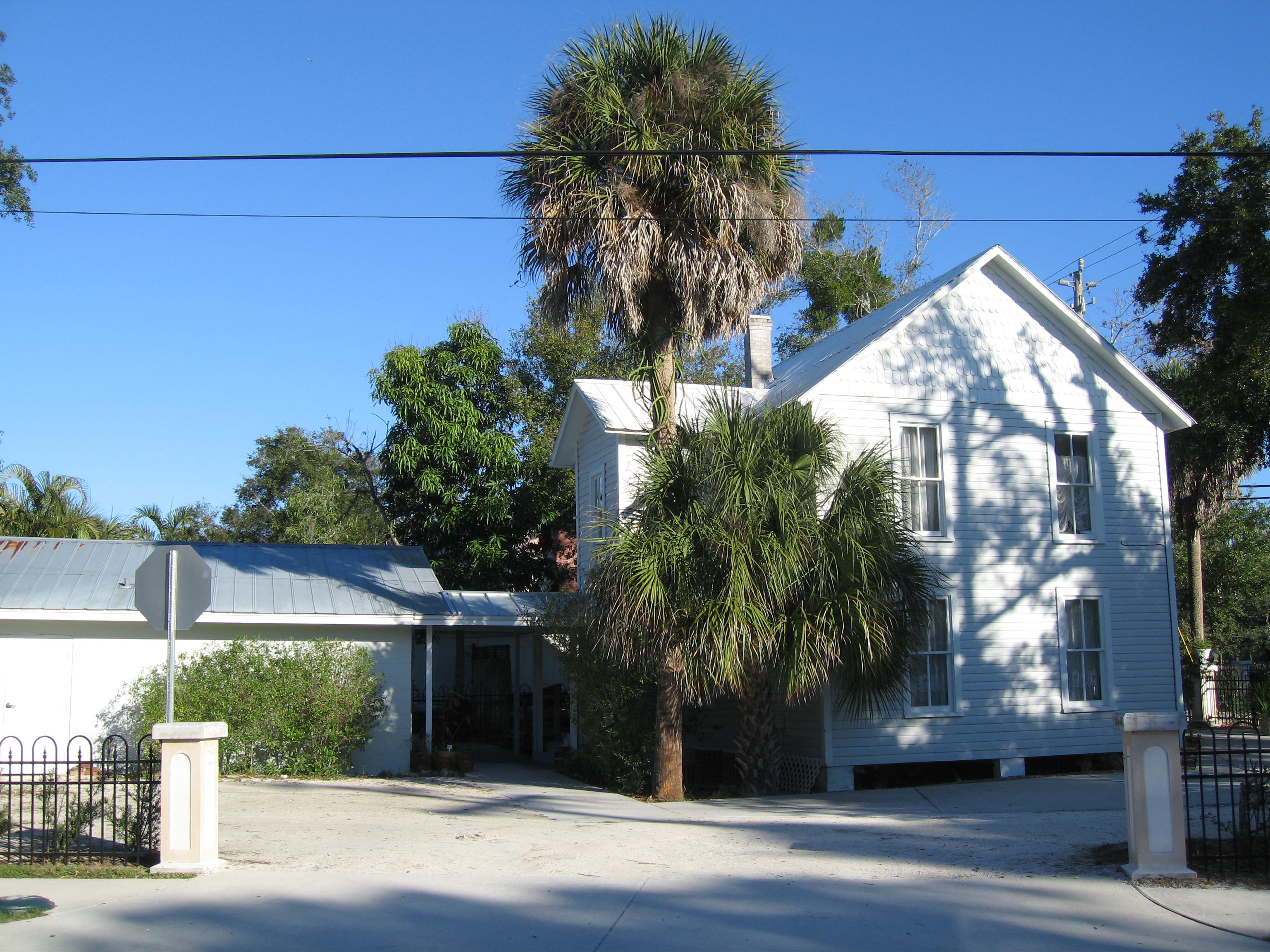
South side of the Roesch House

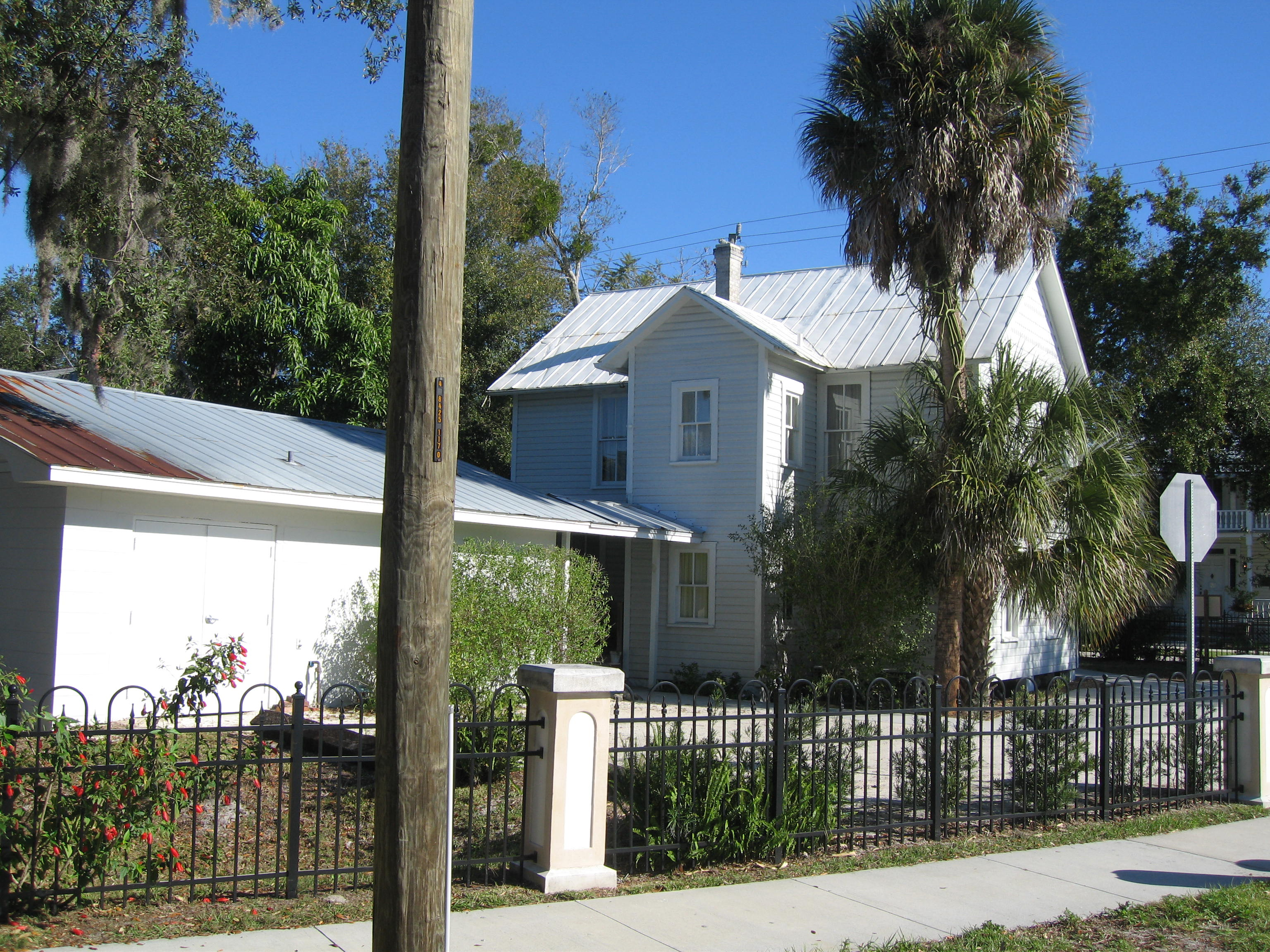
Rear oblique view of the Roesch House
