= John Caroll Houston IV =

American politician (1842–1918)

2nd, 7th, and 15th Mayor of Eau Gallie, Florida
- In office 1897–1898
- Preceded by: William Roesch
- Succeeded by: Albert Burnett
- In office 1902–1903
- Preceded by: W. J. Nesbett
- Succeeded by: George Paddison
- In office 1910–1911
- Preceded by: George Paddison
- Succeeded by: George Paddison

Personal details
- Born: April 3, 1842 Mayport, Florida, US
- Died: February 22, 1918 (aged 75) Houston Street, [[Eau Gallie, Florida|]], US
- Resting place: Houston Pioneer Cemetery, Eau Gallie, Florida
- Spouse: Susan Elizabeth Stewart (m. 1860)
- Children: Clara Houston McMillan, George C., Frank, Bessie, and Annie Laura Houston Braddock
- Occupation: cattle rancher; boat captain for passenger, mail and freight

Military service
- Allegiance: Confederate States of America
- Rank: Captain
- Unit: 3rd Florida Infantry
- Battles/wars: American Indian Wars

John Caroll Houston IV (April 3, 1842 – February 22, 1918) was one of the first permanent settlers of Eau Gallie, Florida and served as its mayor for three terms in 1897, 1902 and 1910.

Preceded by William Roesch	Mayor of Eau Gallie, Florida; 1897–1898	Succeeded by Albert Burnett
Preceded by W. J. Nesbett	Mayor of Eau Gallie, Florida; 1902–1903	Succeeded by George Paddison
Preceded by George Paddison	Mayor of Eau Gallie, Florida; 1910–1911	Succeeded by George Paddison
