= Historic Rossetter House Museum =

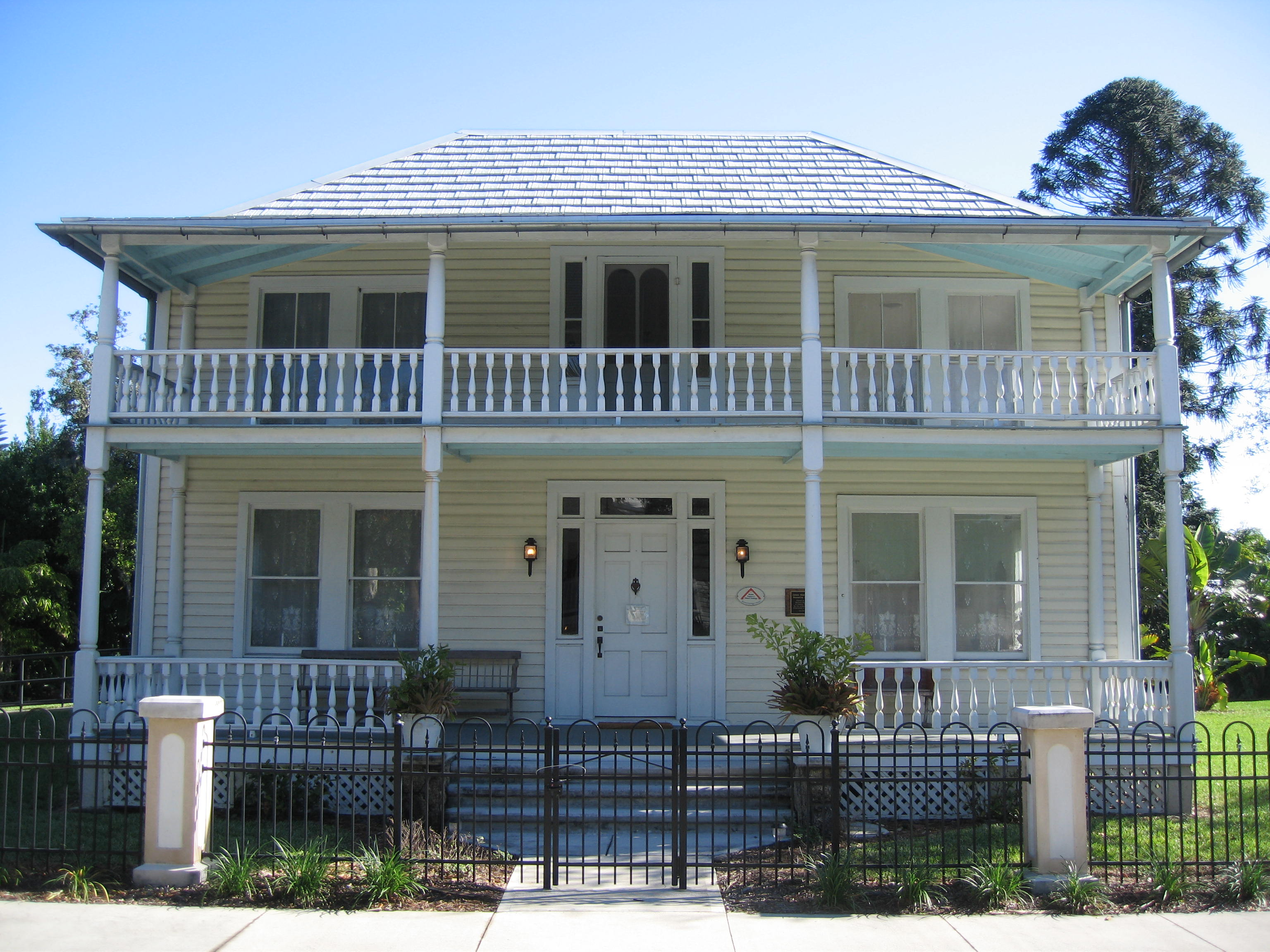

- Location within Florida
- Location: 1320 Highland Avenue; Melbourne, Florida
- Coordinates: 28.128621°N 80.62613°W
- Type: History
- Website: Historic Rossetter House Museum

The Historic Rossetter House Museum is located at 1320 Highland Avenue, Melbourne, Florida in the historic section of Eau Gallie. The museum consists of the James Wadsworth Rossetter House and Gardens (1908), the William P. Roesch House (1901), and the Houston Family Memorial Cemetery (1865). The museum is owned by The Rossetter House Foundation, Inc. and managed by the Florida Historical Society. The museum includes antiques and exhibits that explore local history.
