= Rossetter Park =

Public park in Eau Gallie, Florida

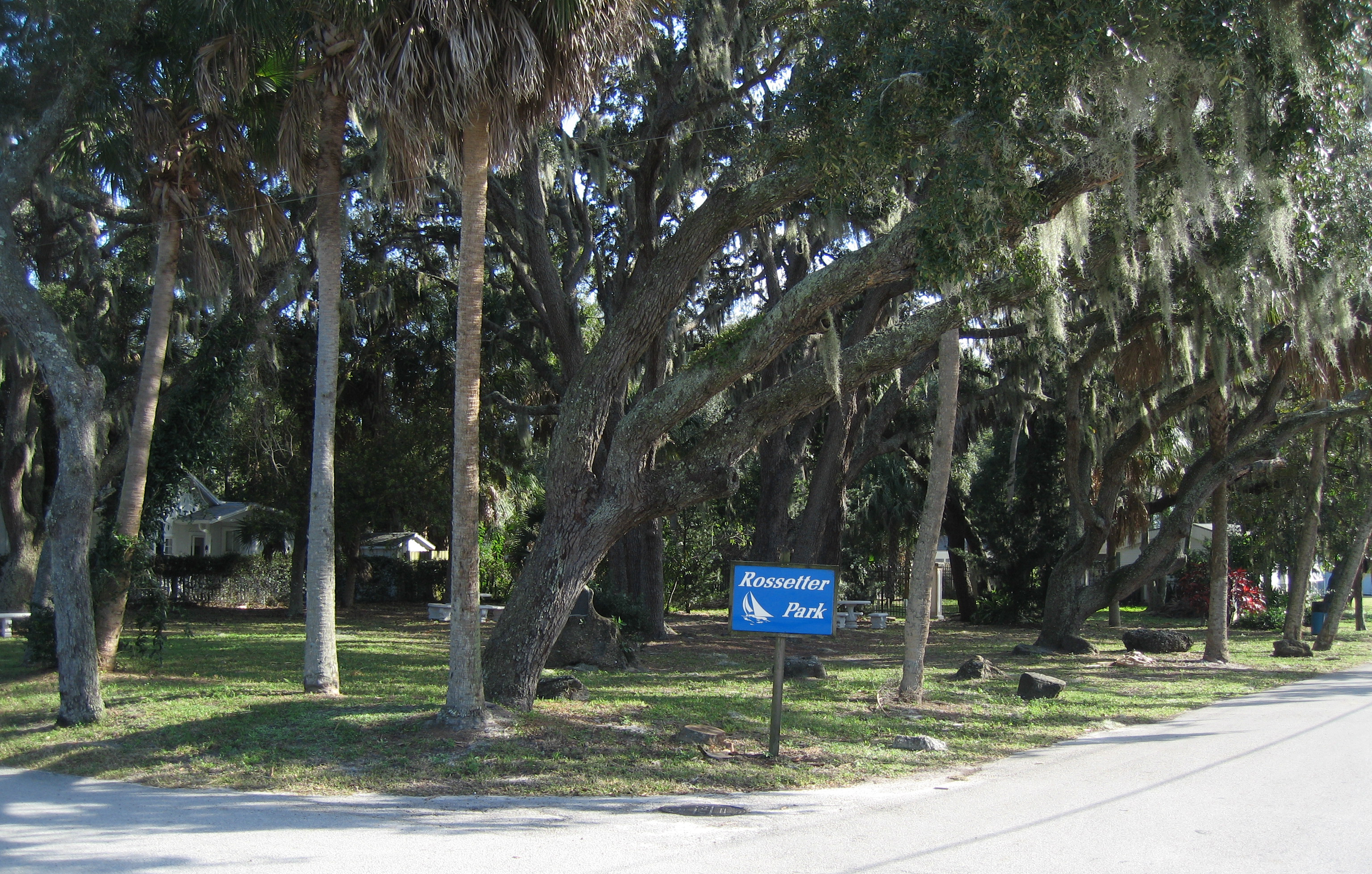
- Northwest corner of Rossetter Park
- Interactive map of Rossetter Park
- Type: Public park
- Location: East side of Highland Avenue between Oak Street & Shady Lane; Eau Gallie, Florida
- Coordinates: 28.12821°N 80.62591°W
- Status: Open all year

Rossetter Park is a public park located on the east side of Highland Avenue between Oak Street and Shady Lane in Eau Gallie, Florida. The park contains the Houston Pioneer Cemetery. The park also contains several grand old live oaks festooned with hanging moss.

== Gallery ==
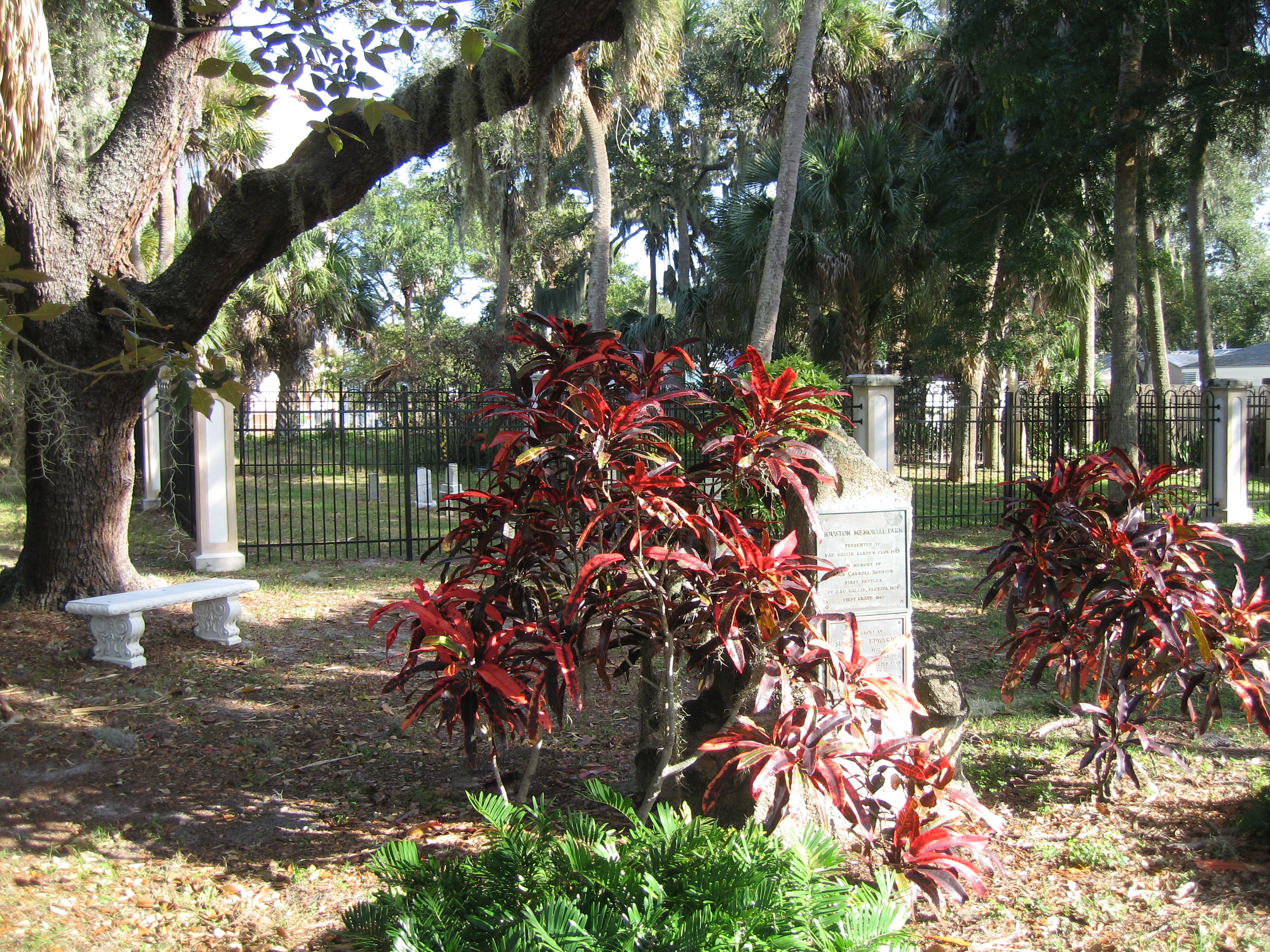
Houston Pioneer Cemetery

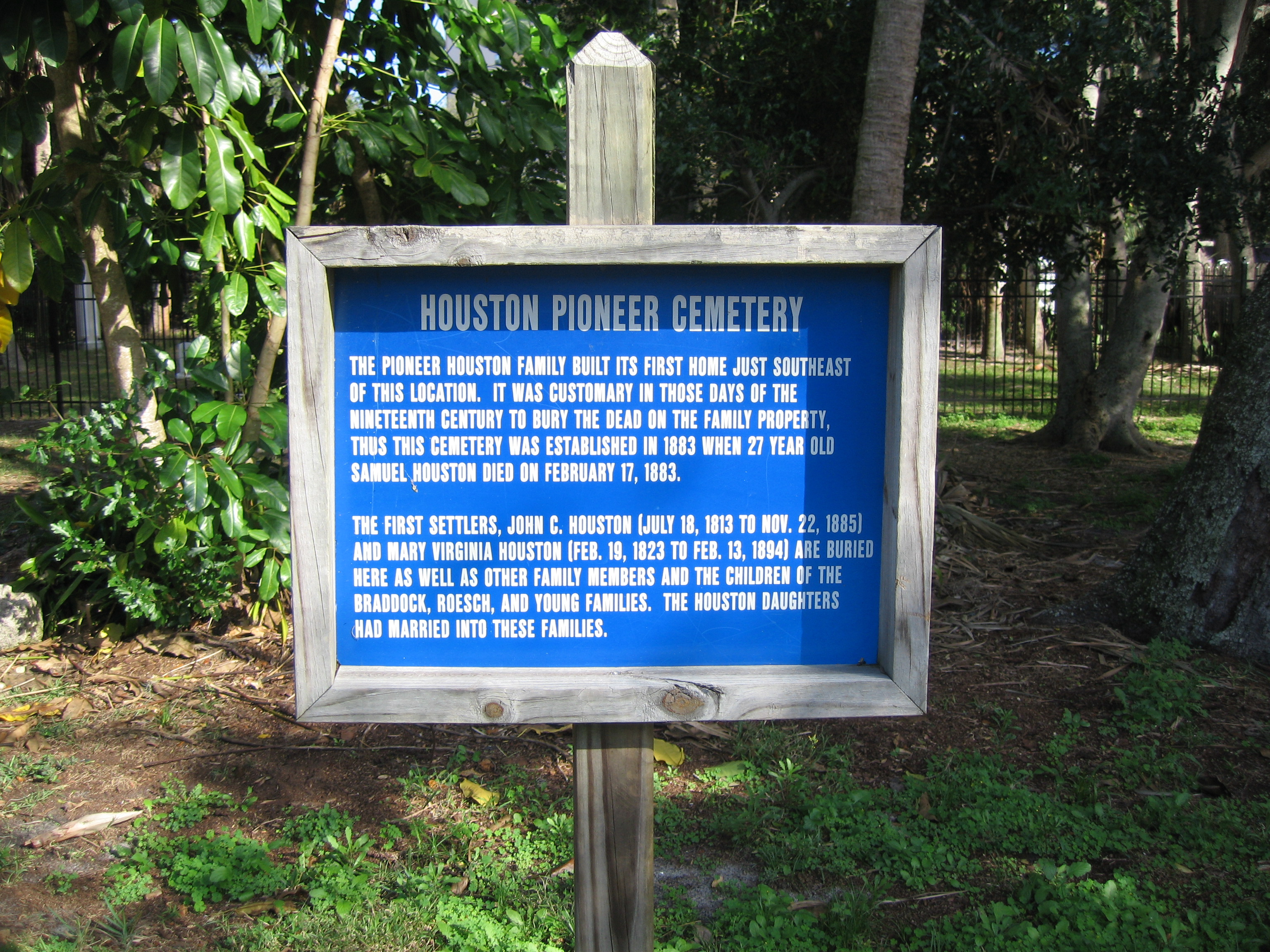
Historical marker in the park at Houston Pioneer Cemetery

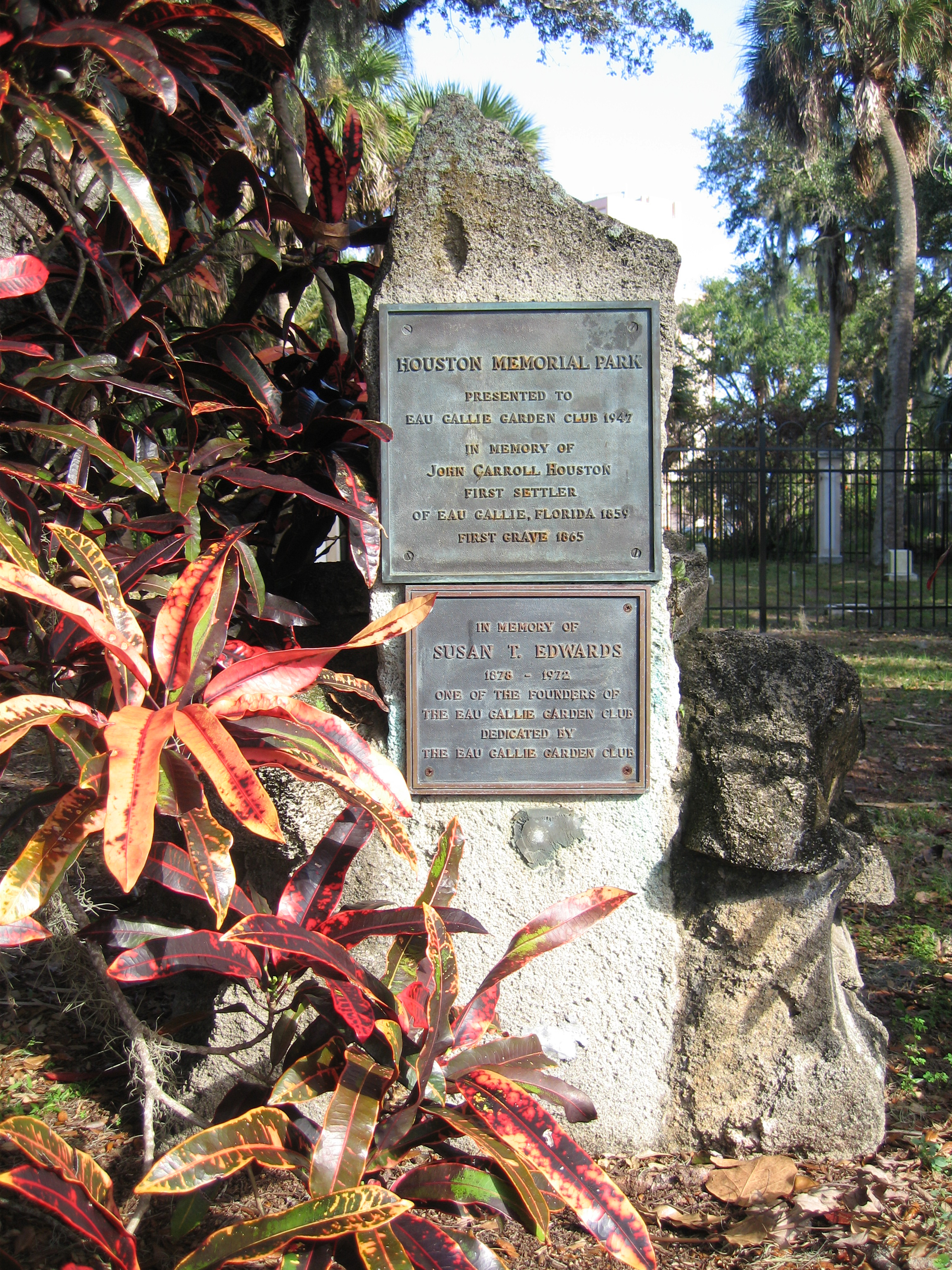
Memorial in park
