= Ginter Building =

Historic U.S. building located at Florida

Coordinates: 28.1320°N 80.6281°W

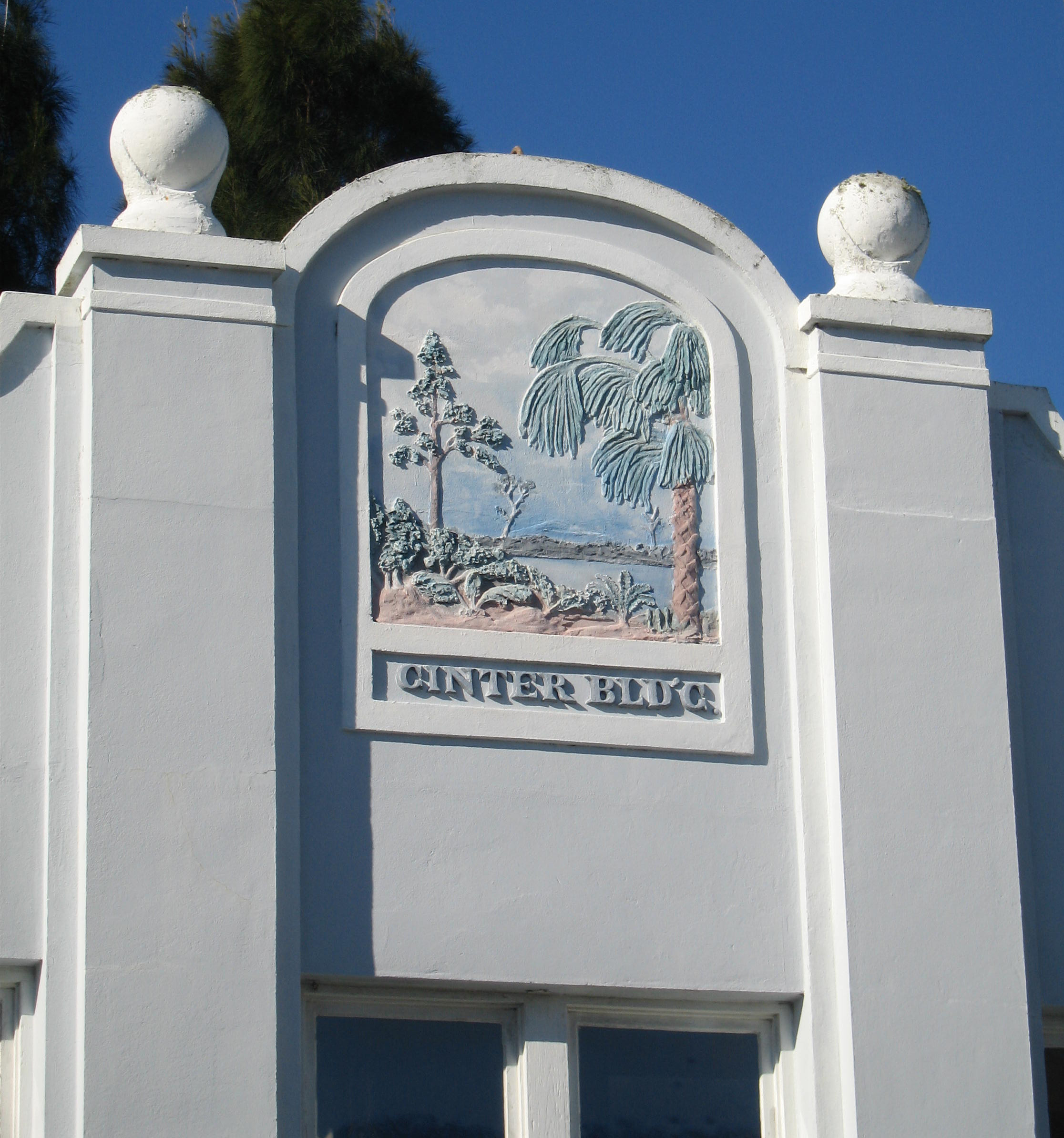
- Detail of the facade
- Interactive map of the Ginter Building area

General information
- Location: 1540 Highland Avenue; Eau Gallie, Florida, United States
- Completed: 1926
- Client: Clifford Ginter

Technical details
- Size: 2 story

The Ginter Building is a historic U.S. building located at 1540 Highland Avenue, Eau Gallie, Florida. The building was constructed in 1926 by Clifford Ginter. Over the years, it was used as an apartment building, a rescue mission house, a store, professional offices, and a nursery school.

== Gallery ==
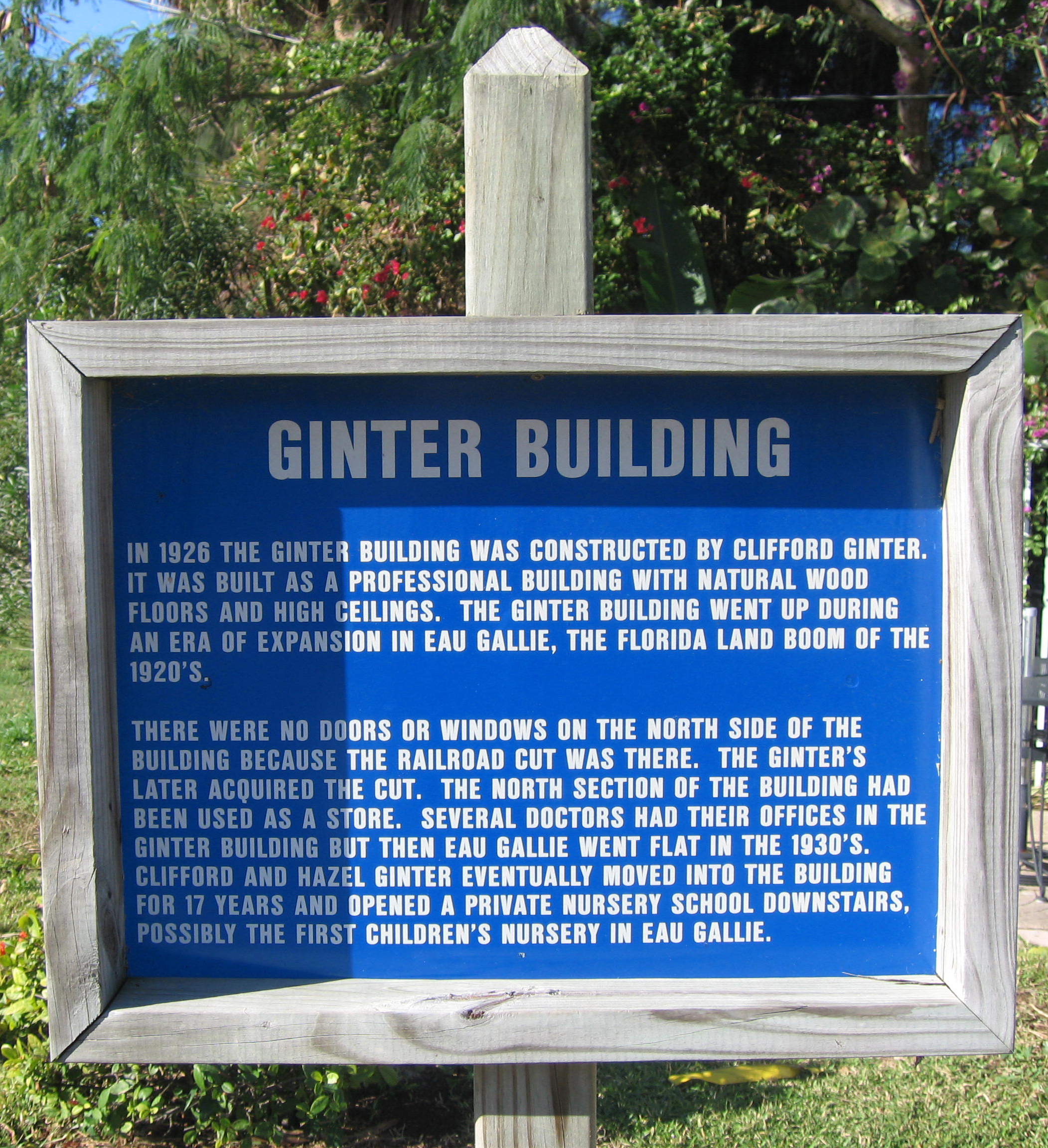
Historical Marker for the Ginter Building
