= James Clark (lynching victim) =

African American who was lynched in the U.S.

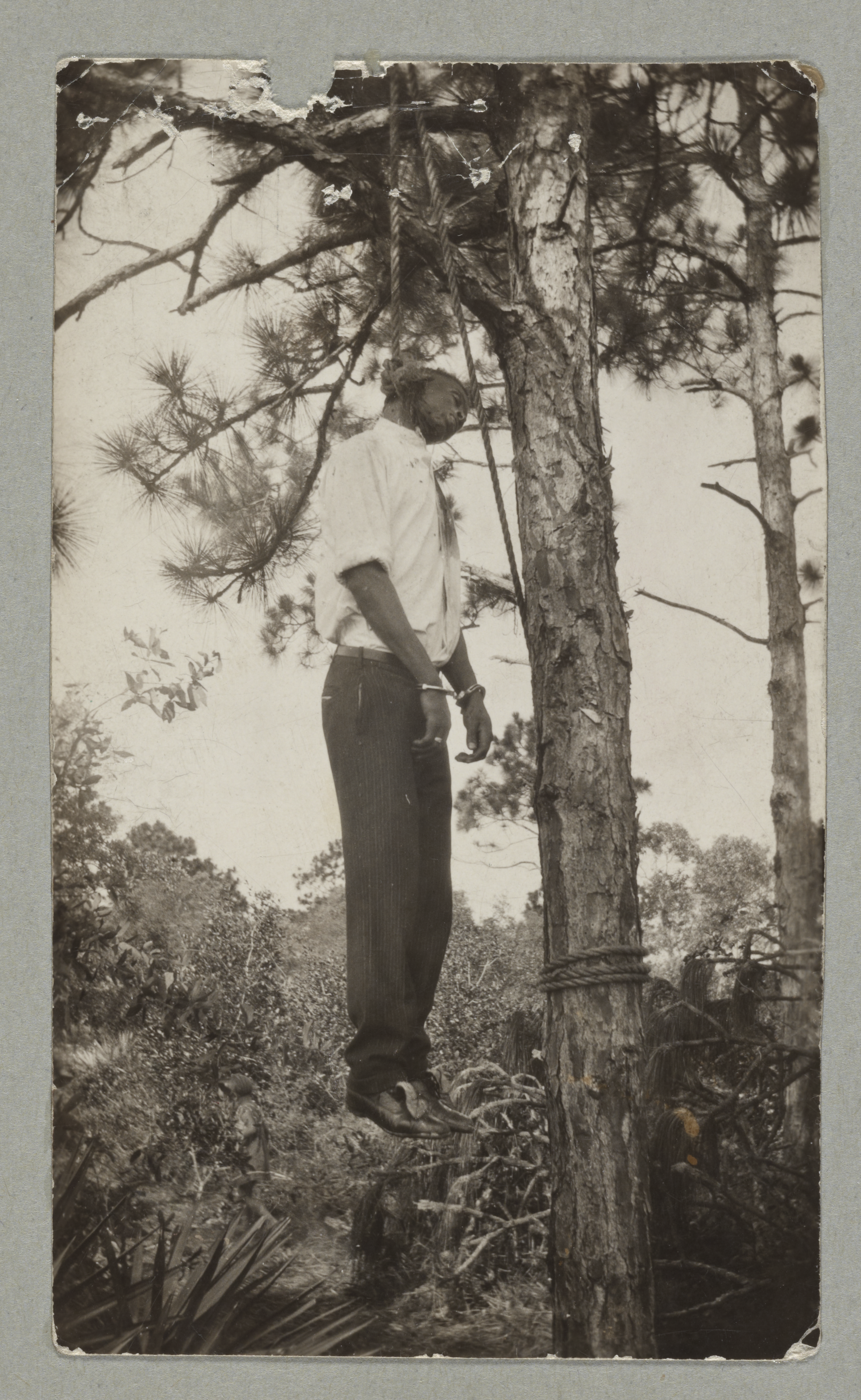
Lynching of James Clark, July 11, 1926, Florida

James Clark was an African-American man who was lynched in Eau Gallie, Florida by ten white men in 1926.

== History ==
On July 11, 1926, James Clark, a chauffeur for a traveling salesman, was accused of rape by a white girl. He was arrested, but the chief of police turned him over to a mob. A noose was placed around his neck, he was dragged over a tree limb, and shot with a shotgun. The street near the site of the lynching, around Parkway Drive and U.S. 1 in what is now Melbourne, Florida was named Lynching Tree Drive until 1980, when the black community petitioned the Melbourne City Council to change the name, which was then changed to Legendary Lane.

No attempt was made to determine who murdered Clark without the benefit of a trial. This is the last known lynching in Brevard County.
