= Houston Pioneer Cemetery =

Cemetery in Eau Gallie, Florida, United States

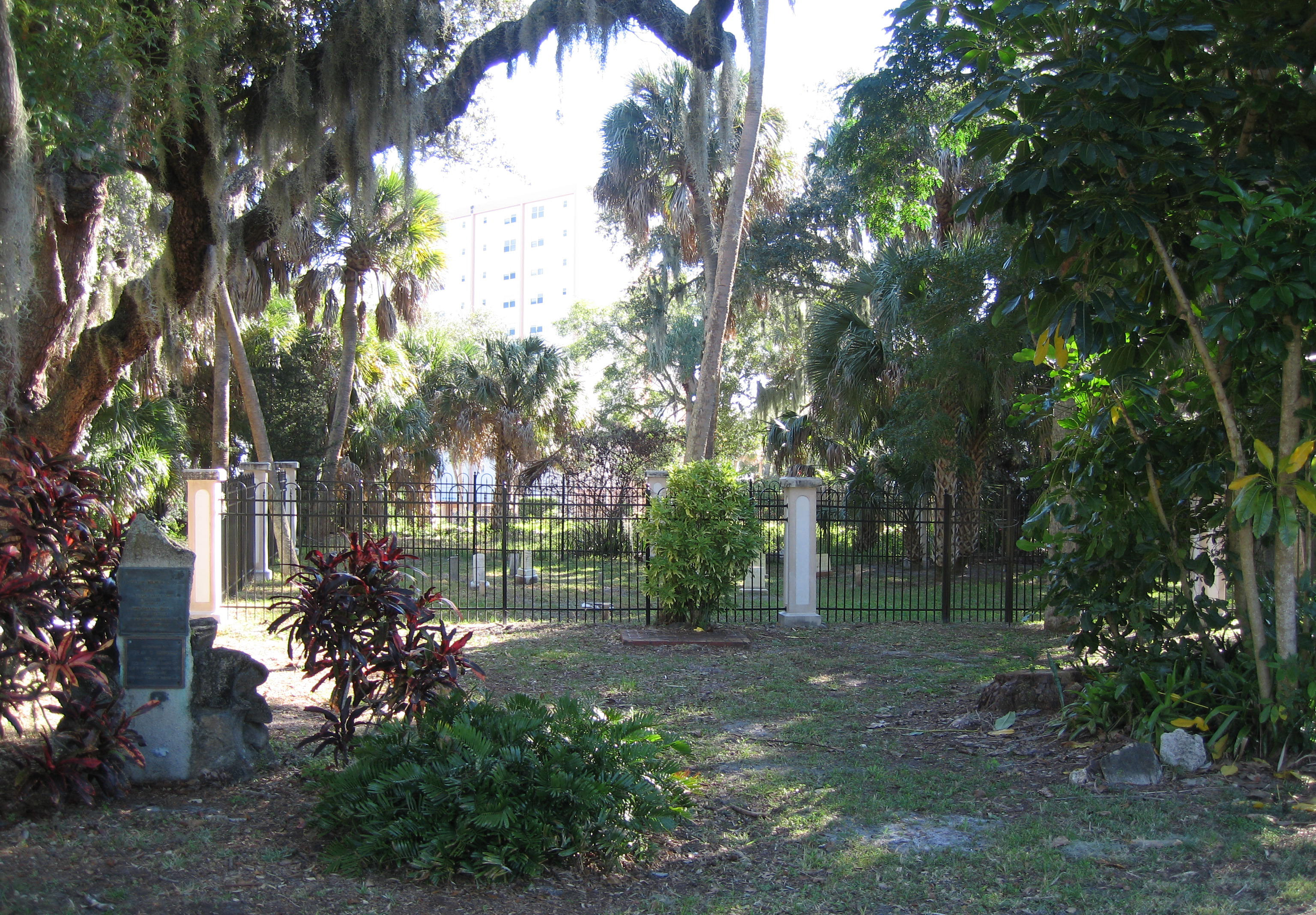
- Front of Houston Pioneer Cemetery
- Interactive map of Houston Pioneer Cemetery

Details
- Established: 1883
- Location: Eau Gallie, Florida
- Coordinates: 28.12796°N 80.62589°W
- Type: private
- Owned by: Rossetter House Foundation, Inc.
- Size: About 75 feet wide X 40 feet deep
- No. of graves: About 12 headstones
- Website: Historic Rossetter House Museum
- Find a Grave: Houston Pioneer Cemetery

The Houston Pioneer Cemetery is a historic cemetery in Eau Gallie, Florida. It is located within Rossetter Park off Highland Avenue between Oak Street and Shady Lane near the James Wadsworth Rossetter House. The cemetery includes graves of original settlers from Eau Gallie such as John Caroll Houston, III and his wife Mary Virginia Houston. The Houston Memorial Park is also located here with a memorial from 1947 located adjacent to the cemetery. This memorial dates the first grave at 1865, but no headstone contains that date. John Caroll Houston, IV was buried here.

== See also ==
- Historic Rossetter House Museum

== Gallery ==
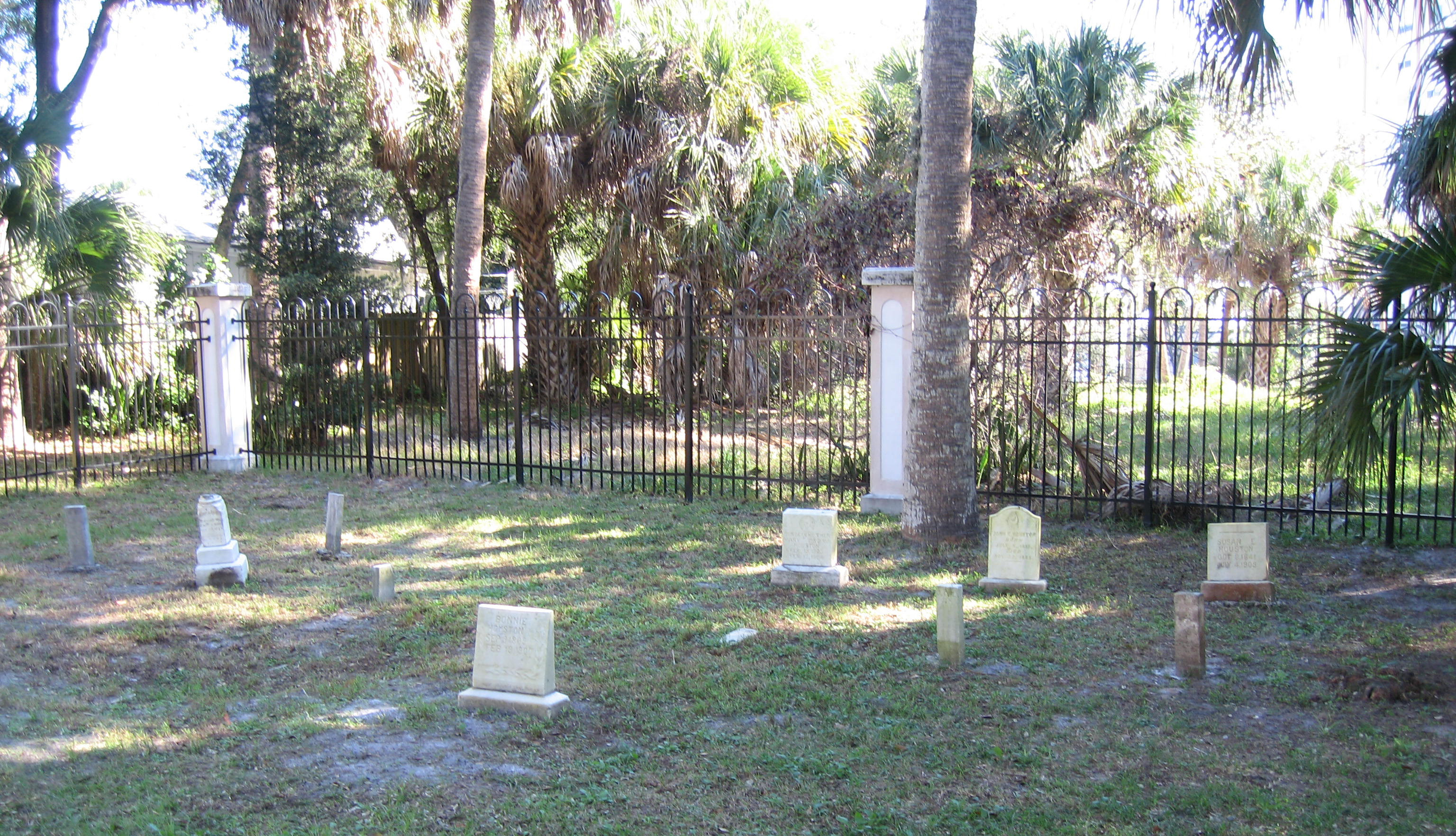
Inside front of cemetery

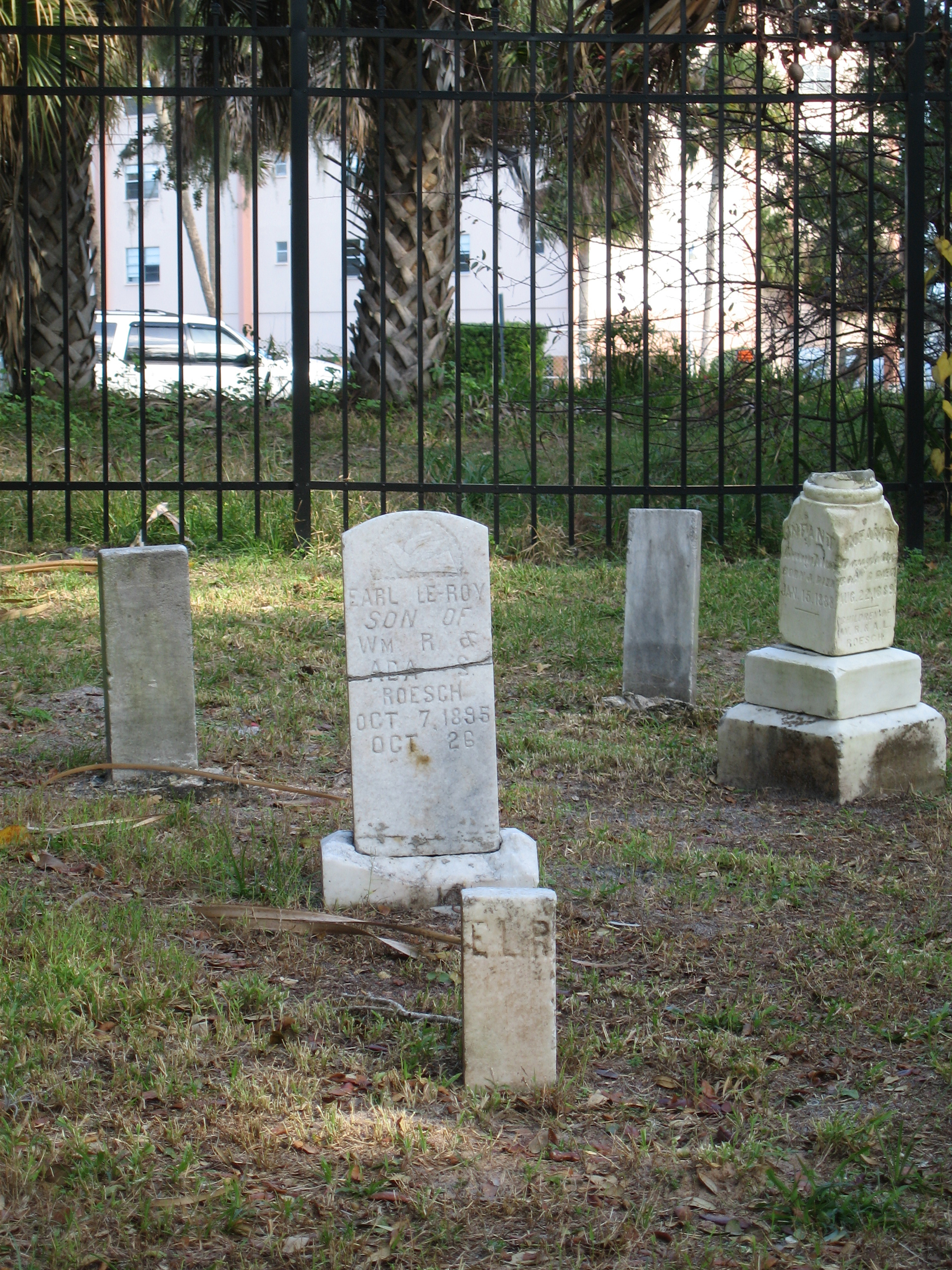
Gravestones in cemetery

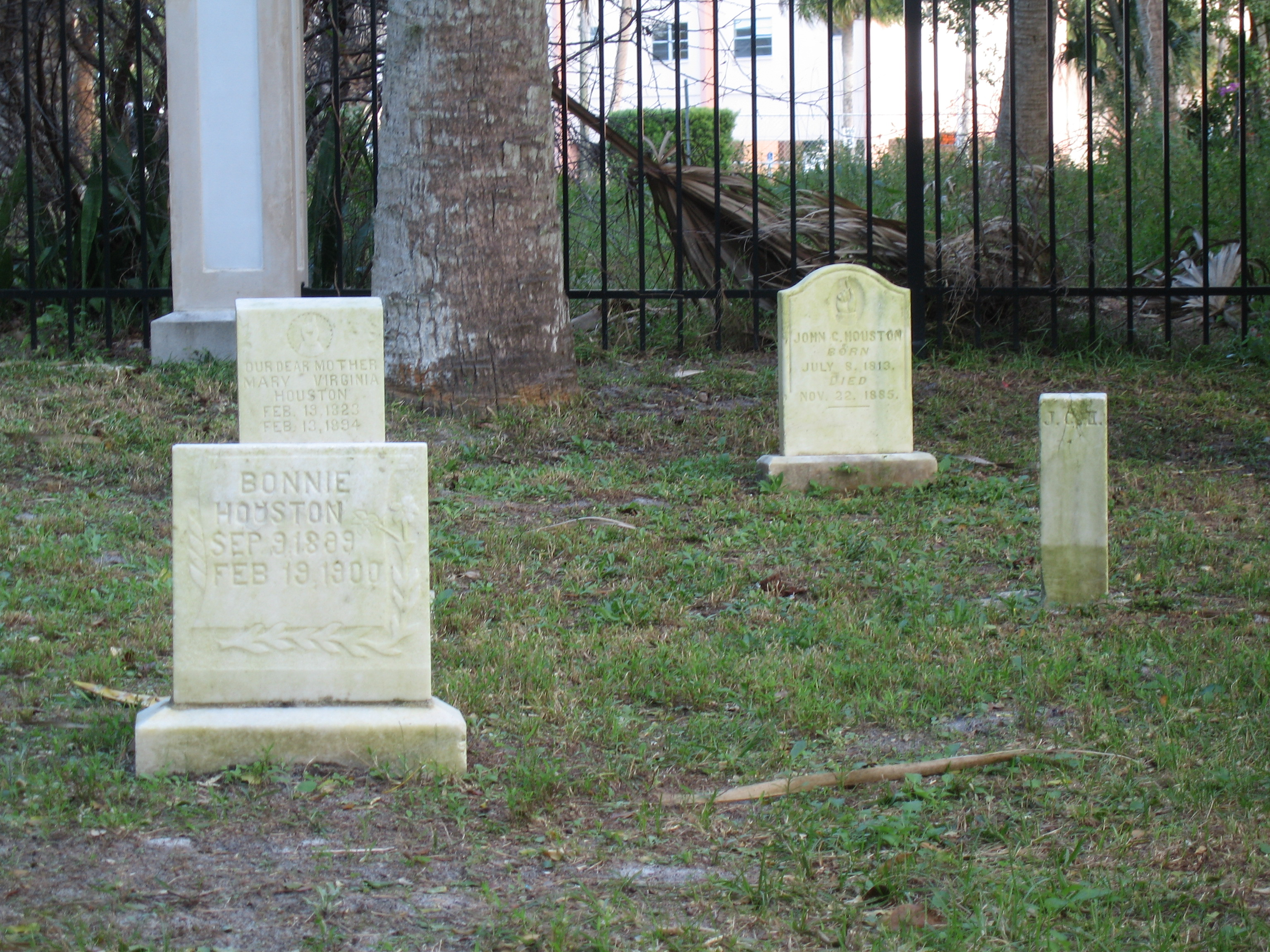
Gravestones in cemetery

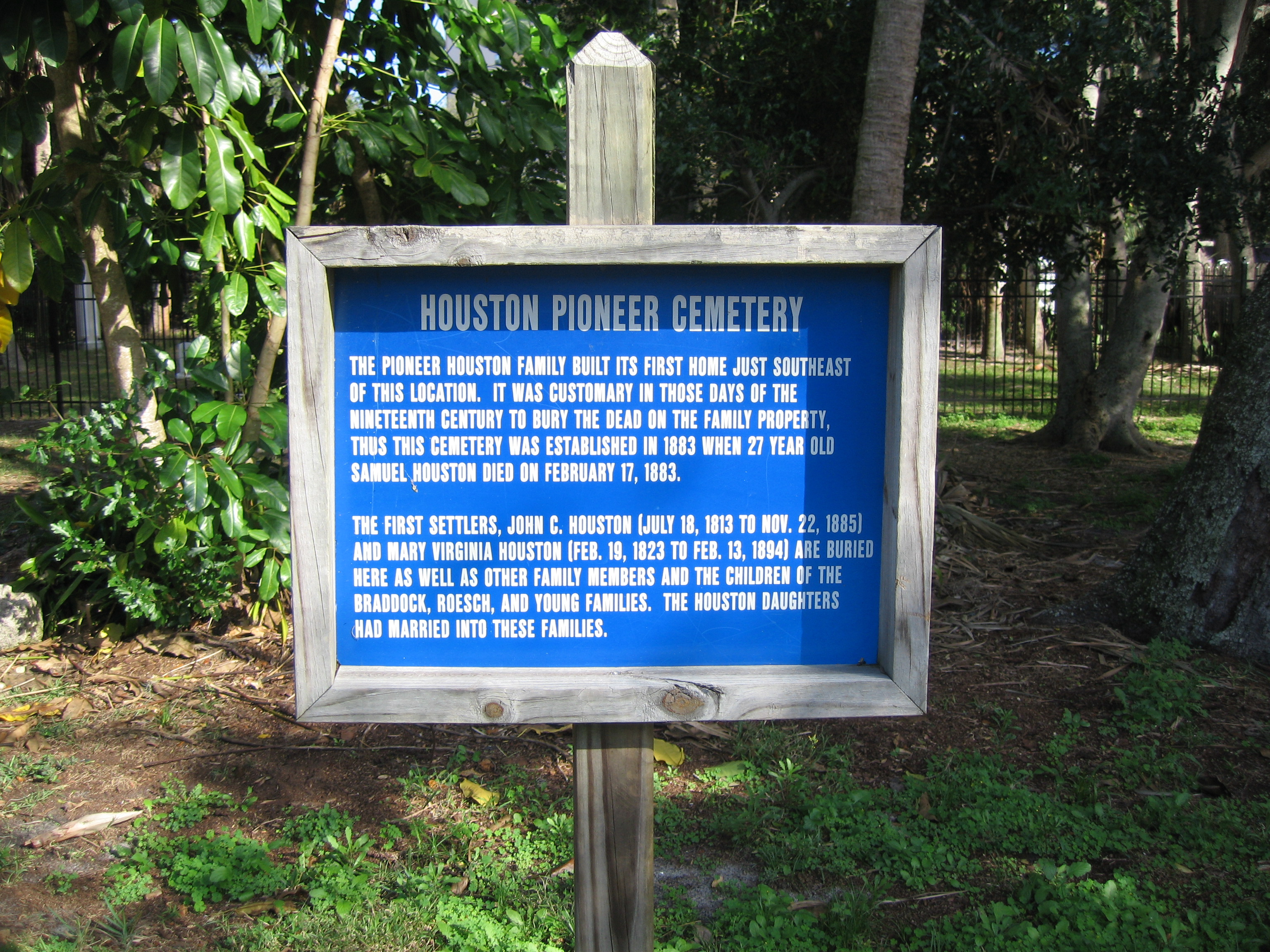
Historical marker in front of cemetery

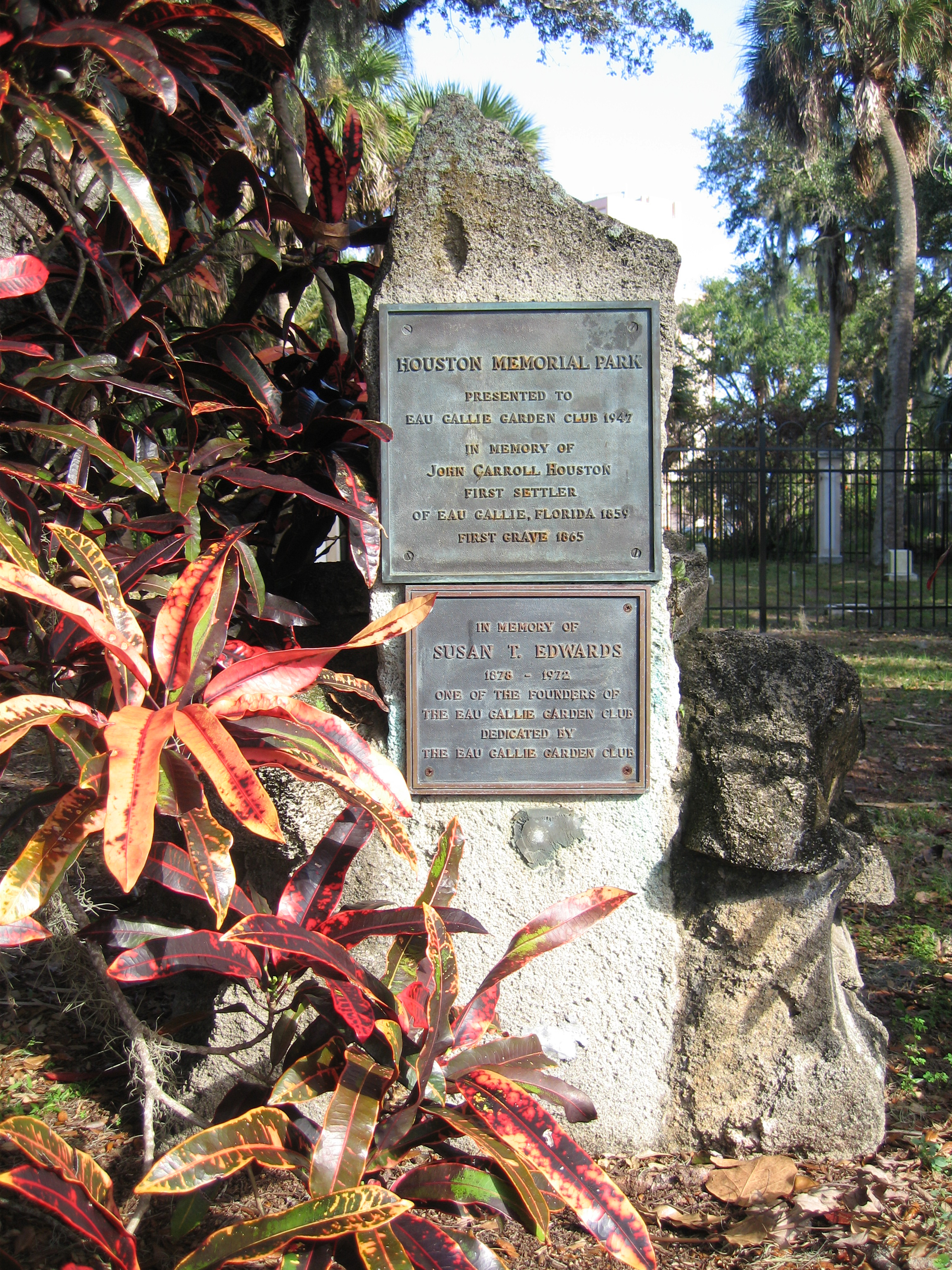
Memorial in front of the cemetery
