= Karrick Building (Eau Gallie, Florida) =

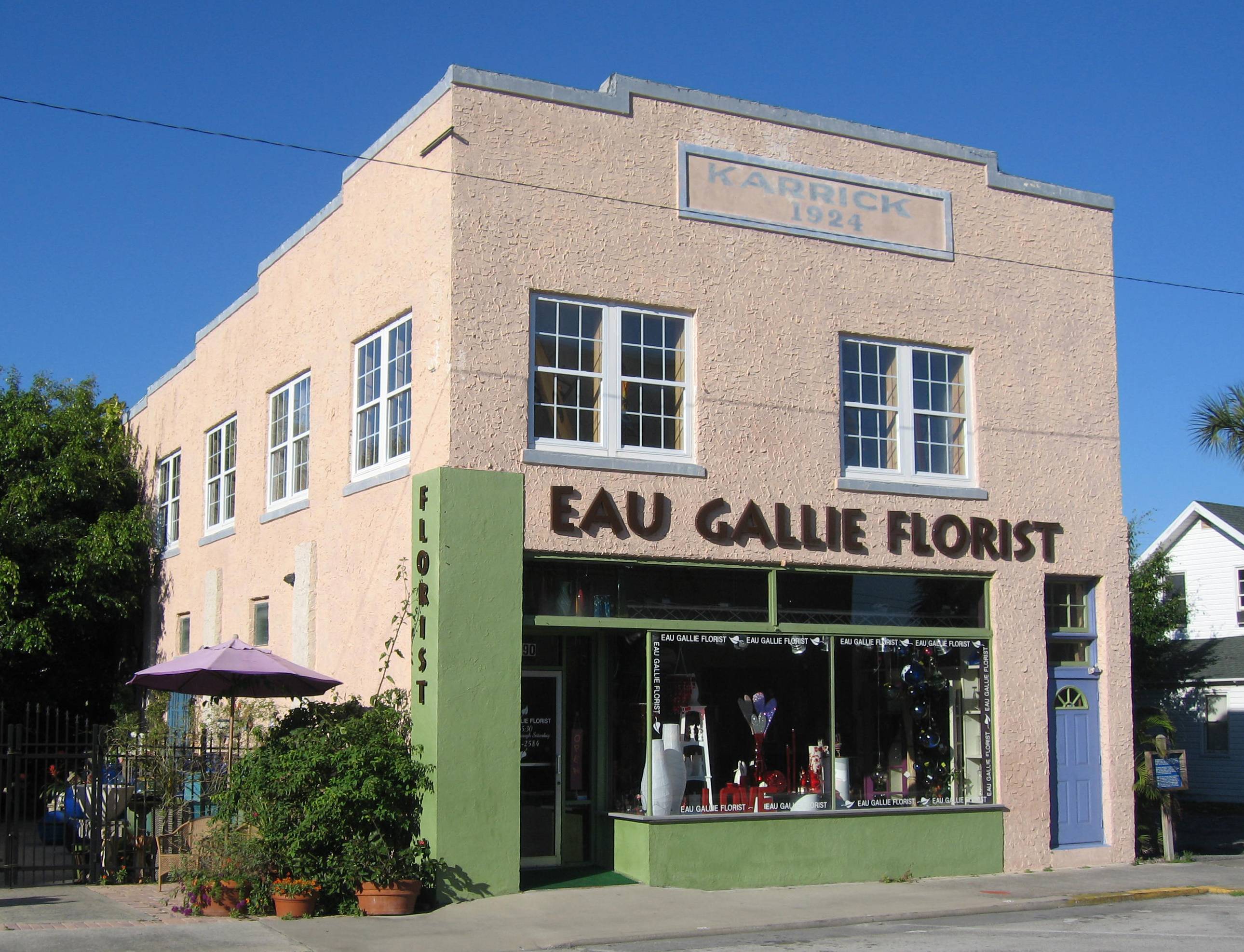
- Oblique view of the Karrick Building
- Interactive map of the Karrick Building area

General information
- Location: 1490 Highland Avenue; Eau Gallie, Florida, United States
- Coordinates: 28.13111°N 80.6276°W
- Construction started: 1924

The Karrick Building is a historic U.S. building located at 1490 Highland Avenue, Eau Gallie, Florida. The building was constructed in 1924 by Jesse Karrick and it was used as a general merchandise and grocery store until 1963. Jesse Karrick was the first proprietor of the store and also served as the first fire chief of Eau Gallie.

== Gallery ==
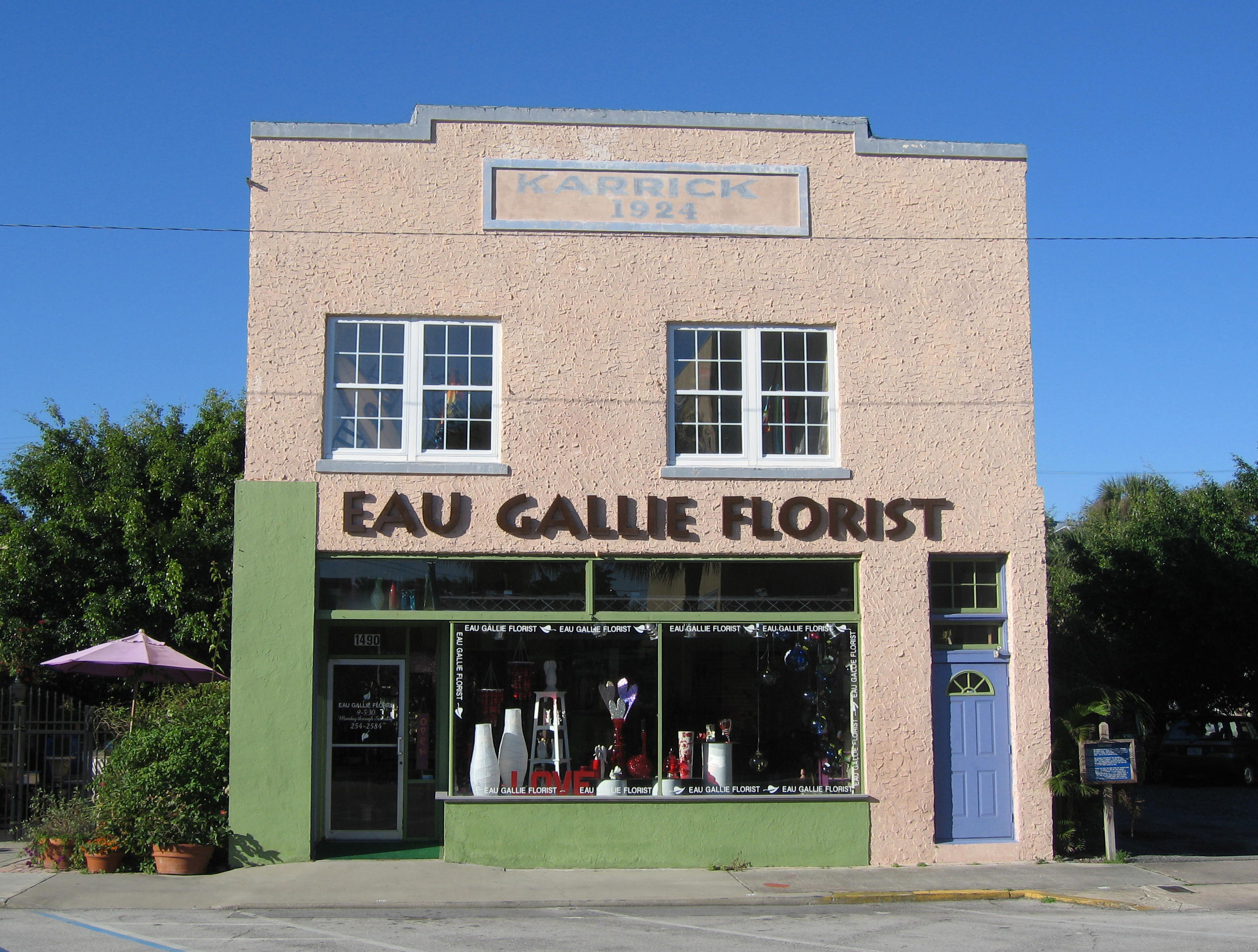
Front of the Karrick Building

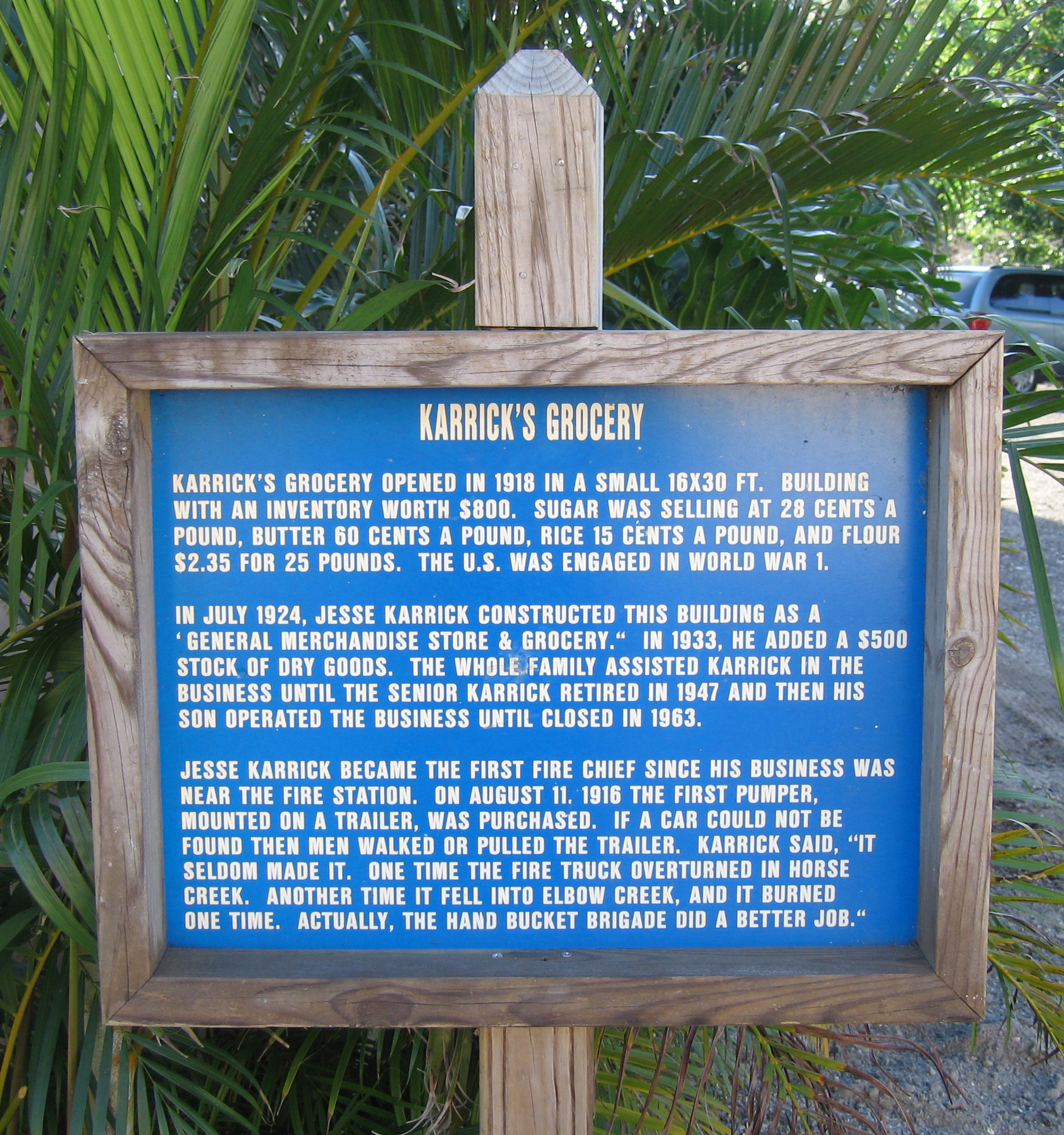
Historical Marker for Karrick's Grocery

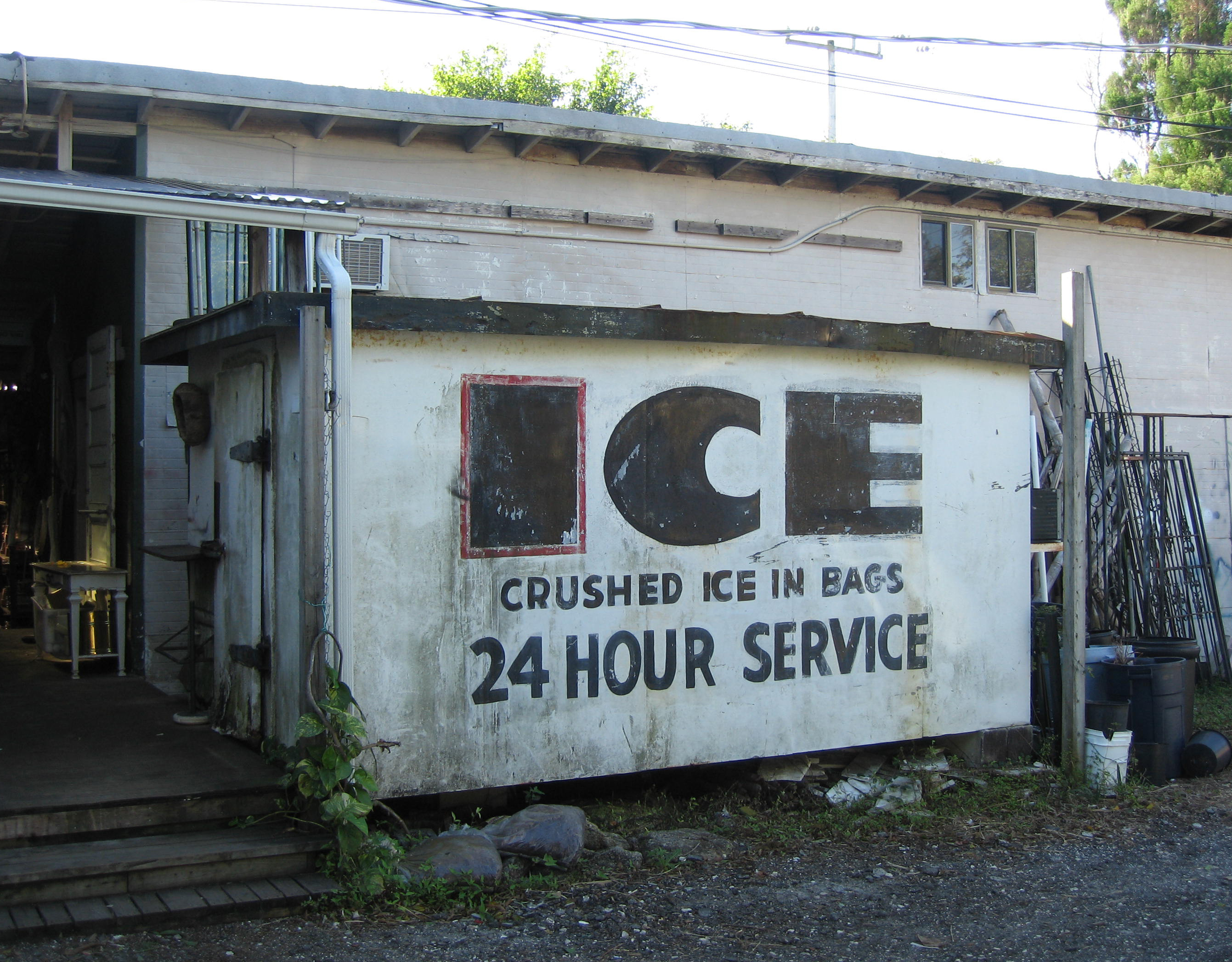
Vintage Outside Ice Freezer at the Karrick Building
