= Foosaner Art Museum =

Art museum in Melbourne, Florida

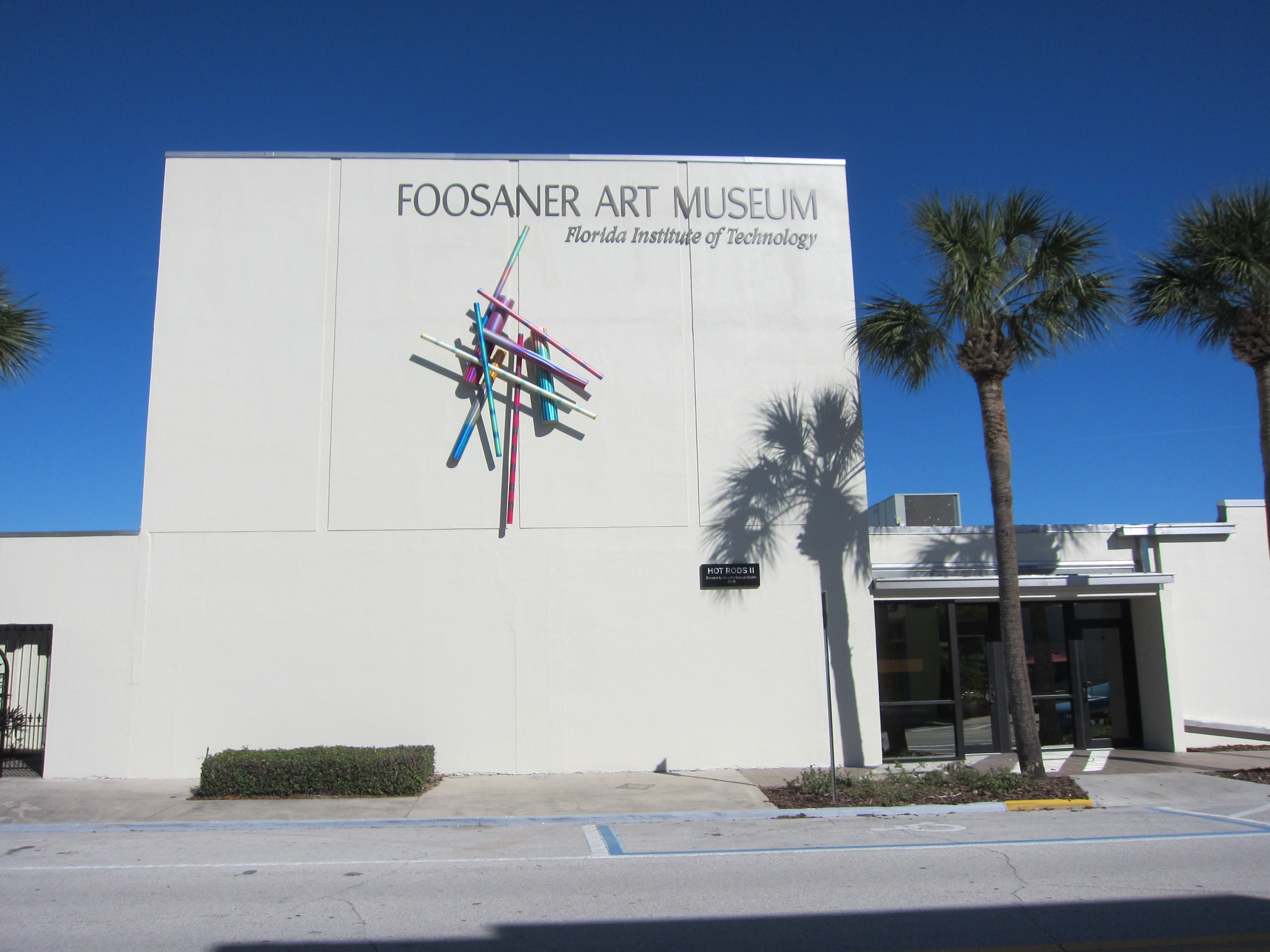

- Location within Florida
- Established: March 14, 1978
- Location: 1463 Highland Avenue; Melbourne, Florida
- Coordinates: 28.131281°N 80.627275°W
- Type: Art
- Website: foosanerartmuseum.org

The Foosaner Art Museum, formerly the Brevard Art Museum, was located along the Indian River in the Eau Gallie Arts District, 1463 Highland Avenue, Melbourne, Florida. Since opening in 1978 the Foosaner Art Museum amassed over 5,000 objects, spanning 20 centuries. These items formed the museum's Permanent Collection, reflecting not only the museum's interests and specialties, but also the lives of the people who lived in the community.

Throughout the year, visitors could experience a changing selection of exhibitions. Rotating exhibitions of nationally and internationally recognized artists showcased contemporary trends and historical art movements as do the variety of exhibitions created from the museum's permanent collection. The Foosaner Art Museum's permanent collection was composed primarily of Modern and Contemporary Art and included the Enrique Conill Mendoza Collection of American Industrial Design and the world's largest collection of works by Ernst Oppler (German, 1897–1929).

== History ==
The Foosaner Art Museum, Florida Institute of Technology, was established March 8, 1978 as the Brevard Art Center and Museum, Inc. The first building was acquired during the summer of 1978, and was modified to meet the needs of a visual arts museum. The museum was then a 4,500-square-foot exhibition space consisting of three galleries.

In June 1980, a major gift from Cocoa Beach philanthropist Samuel J. Foosaner made possible the purchase of a 6,000-sq. ft. building adjoining the existing museum. The building was subsequently remodeled to accommodate an extensive program of studio classes. Children and adults now enjoy the opportunity to study and create art at the Renee Foosaner Education Center.

In February 1986, the museum moved to a new five-gallery facility across the street from the original site. The renovated space tripled the exhibition area and provided greater office, technical support, and storage areas. Culturally significant collections could now be exhibited at the museum. The permanent collection has grown to over 3,000 objects with the addition of several recently gifted artworks.

Following the demise of the community's local science museum in 1994, the board of trustees voted to undergo expansion and develop a children's science education facility adjacent to the museum's educational wing, adding approximately 5,000 square feet of science exhibition space. The newly refurbished science center opened in the fall of 1995.

In February 1995, the organization name was officially changed to Brevard Museum of Art and Science. In 1999 the science center was renamed the Ruth Cote Clemente Children's Science Center, in honor of a major donor.

Educational programming remains at the core of the Foosaner Art Museum's mission, with their extensive range of programs designed to appeal to the community. As the largest visual arts museum in Brevard County, the museum plays an invaluable role in the county for both residents and visitors.

Today, more than 30 years later, the Foosaner Art Museum has tripled the exhibition area and provides modern technical conservation methods and storage areas as the collection increases in size. In addition, children and adults now enjoy the opportunity to study and create art at the Renee Foosaner Education Center which houses pottery, painting, drawing and printmaking studios.

In June 2007, the Board of Trustees announced the museum's name change from the Brevard Museum of Art and Science to the Brevard Art Museum. The former Science Center space was redesigned to enlarge painting and ceramic studios.

On July 1, 2011, the museum merged with the Florida Institute of Technology, the only independent, technological university in the Southeast. Florida Tech received a $1 million gift from the Foosaner Foundation, by Samuel Foosaner's daughter Dione Negroni-Hendrick (d. 2017), to benefit the museum, now officially known as the Foosaner Art Museum. "The Foosaner family has a long history of philanthropy in Brevard," said Florida Tech President Anthony J. Catanese. "This generous gift will help perpetuate the important efforts of education and cultural enrichment started by the museum in 1978, and now continued by Florida Tech."

In January 2018, the university's board of trustees voted to close the museum due to its expense to run, however a second vote in February extended its operation till July 2021. Florida Tech sold the space to property developers in April 2020. The collection would be transferred to the Appleton Museum in Ocala. Samuel Foosaner's granddaughter and Negroni-Hendrick's daughter Andrea Lee Negroni expressed disappointment and anger with Florida Tech for having "squandered" the museum. She also revealed the last of her mother's donation was processed three months before the board's vote, leading Negroni to believe her mother was deceived into inducing a gift and that she would not have donated if she knew this would happen.

== Exhibits ==
- Langdon Kihn: An American Story (22 March? - 11 May 2014) - more than 80 works on view, with 31 from Dr. Clifford Bragdon's personal collection. The rest were lent from private collectors, institutions and the National Geographic Society. Also on view were photos from The New York Times documenting Kihn's career, and relics from western North American Indigenous communities. Those relics were given to Kihn and now belong to the Bragdons' personal collection.
- Clyde Butcher: Florida's Photographer (8 June 2019 – ) - 69 black and white landscape photographs.
- Abstraction: Retrospective Memories (March 2021 – July 2021) by Rene Griffith and Steve Steinberg
