= Winchester Symphony House =

1886 building in Melbourne, Florida, US

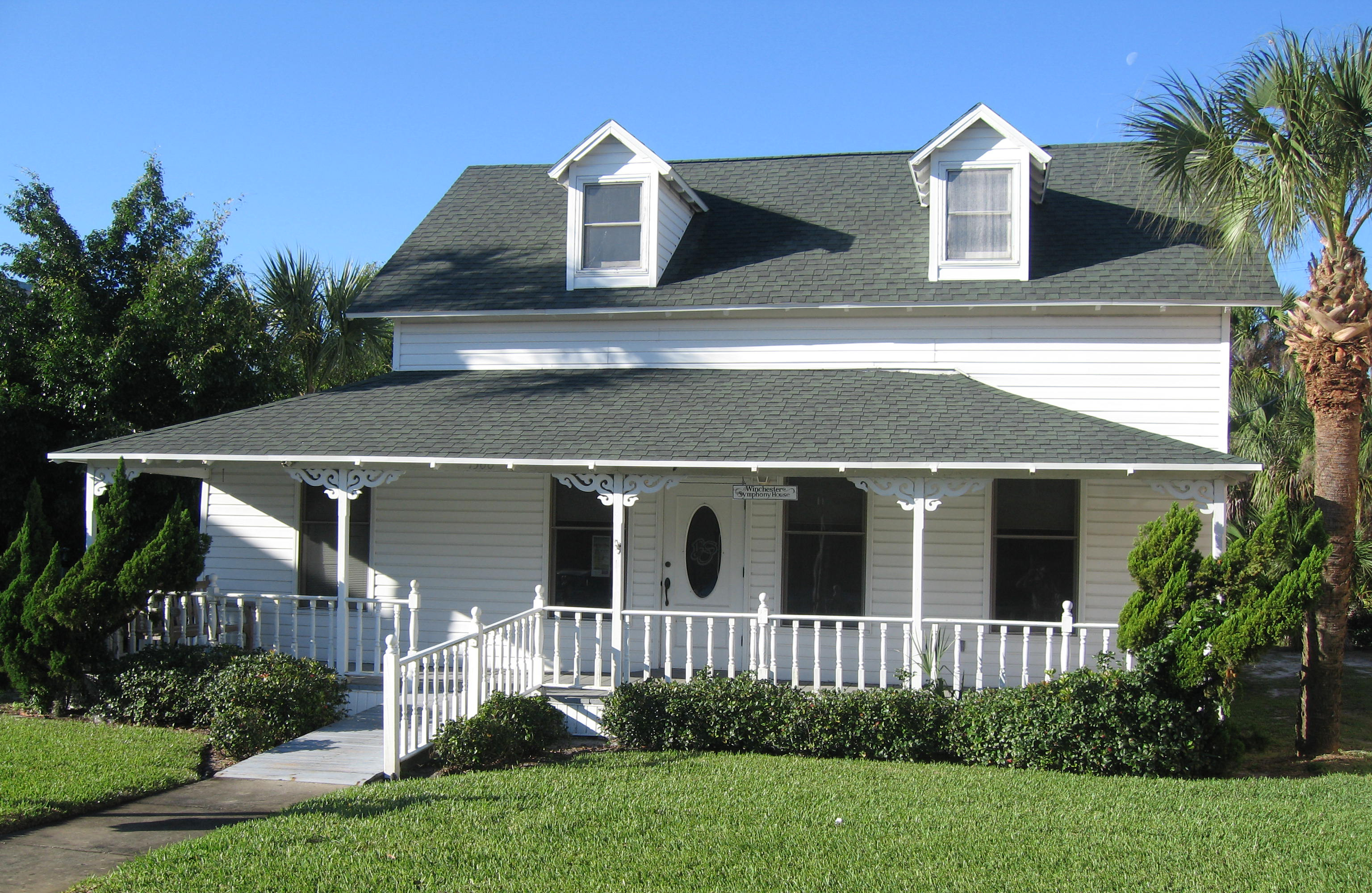
- Interactive map of the Winchester Symphony House area

General information
- Type: Wood
- Architectural style: Florida Cracker
- Location: 1500 Highland Avenue; Melbourne, Florida
- Coordinates: 28°07′53″N 80°37′40″W
- Construction started: 1886

Technical details
- Floor count: 2

Winchester Symphony House is a historic home located in the Eau Gallie-section of Melbourne, Florida. The house was built in 1886. William Treutler, director of the State Bank of Eau Gallie and hotel proprietor in Eau Gallie, built the house. Brevard County and the State of Florida list this building as a historic site. Currently, the house serves as the headquarters for the administrative staff of the Brevard Symphony Orchestra.
