= Eau Gallie, Florida =

- Neighborhood of Melbourne
- Interactive map of Eau Gallie, Florida
- Coordinates: 28°07′45″N 80°37′48″W
- Country: United States of America
- State: Florida
- County: Brevard
- City: Melbourne
- Settled: 1859
- First settler: John Caroll Houston, IV
- Incorporated: 1860
- Consolidated with Melbourne: 1969
- Founder: William Henry Gleason
- Time zone: UTC-5:00 (Eastern)
  - Summer (DST): UTC-4:00 (Eastern)

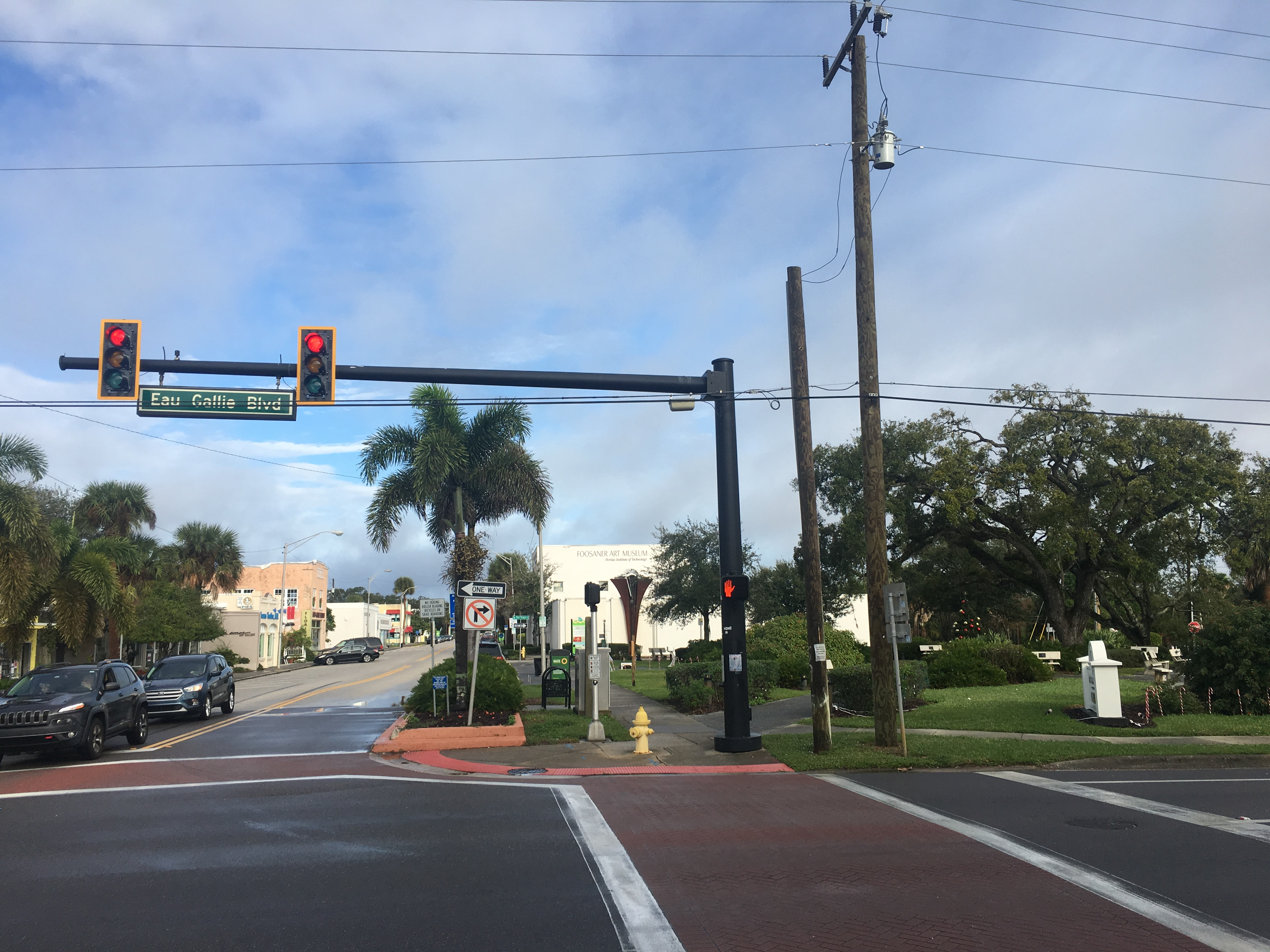
Eau Gallie Boulevard, December 2019

Eau Gallie (/ˌoʊˈɡæli/) is a neighborhood in the city of Melbourne, Florida, located on the city's northern side. It was an independent city in Brevard County from 1860 until 1969.

That year residents of Eau Gallie and Melbourne voted to merge their governments. A subsequent vote resulted in the combined jurisdiction being named Melbourne. The name and identity of Eau Gallie persists in a number of local entities and was used by the Eau Gallie Arts District Main Street, a fully accredited Florida Main Street program since 2010.

== History ==
In 1859, the U.S. Army sent John Caroll Houston IV to conduct a Seminole Indian census. Arriving in the Indian River area, Houston fell in love with its beauty. Houston named the area Arlington, for a community near Jacksonville where he had once lived. He took a leave of absence and applied for a soldier's land grant. Houston traveled to the area of Eau Gallie with his sons and 10 enslaved Africans. His wife joined him a year later when he had completed clearing land and building their cabin with their slaves.

The area changed little during the Civil War. Former lieutenant governor, William Henry Gleason founded Eau Gallie in 1869 as he made his way to Arlington from Miami. Gleason acquired land consisting of the entire area from the Indian River Lagoon to Lake Washington (about thirty square miles).

Eau Gallie is commonly said to mean "rocky water", since coquina rocks were found in the area. While eau means "water" in French, gallie is not a French word and may be derived from galet ("pebble" in French). Some attribute it a Chippewa word; however, Chippewa speakers lived along the northern border of the United States and Canada.

A US post office was established in 1871.

The Kentucky Military Institute wintered in Eau Gallie from 1907 to 1921.

In 1920, the population had increased to about 500 people, nearly the same as adjacent Melbourne.

In 1926, ten white men lynched a black man named James Clark for allegedly raping a white woman. This was the last person lynched in the county. The perpetrators were never brought to justice.

For entertainment, the town had a "speedway" for stock car races west of Wickham Road from 1957 to about 1971.

The site of the now-abandoned speedway was later redeveloped to make way for Wickham Business Park.

== Economy ==
Eau Gallie has original historic buildings, live oaks, and native plants located on the Indian River Lagoon. It is anchored by the Eau Gallie Civic Center, Public Library and Pier, as well as Pineapple Park which has a lighted gazebo under ancient live oaks along the Indian River Lagoon, Foosaner Art Museum/FIT, and the Renee Foosaner Education Center.

Eau Gallie is home to the Eau Gallie Arts District Main Street program (EGAD), an award-winning, fully accredited Florida and National Main Street organization.

This area is also home to fine art galleries and long-established businesses, as well as new entrepreneurs that have opened new businesses in the historic little city stimulated by the presence of the Eau Gallie Arts District, which boasts an Outdoor Art Museum consisting of over 30 murals, a mosaic and sculptures. The Historic Rossetter House Museum and Gardens, which is on the National Register of Historic Places, offers home tours, rental space for private events and hosts their own events.

== Historic section ==
Eau Gallie contains a historic area with several notable museums and houses. These include: the Advent Christian Church, Foosaner Art Museum, the Ginter Building, the Historic Rossetter House Museum, the James Wadsworth Rossetter House on the National Register of Historic Places, the Karrick Building, the Roesch House, and the Winchester Symphony House.

An area of 14.31 acres (5.79 ha), containing 31 houses, is petitioning for official recognition as a Historic District. The first permanent European-American settler, John Carroll Houston, arrived in 1859.

=== Namesakes ===
Eau Gallie Square in the Eau Gallie Arts District is a public green space with live oaks and band shell that serves as the center of some community events. This also the location of the Rocky Water Brew Fest.

== Notable people ==
- Tom Rapp, singer-songwriter from psychedelic folk band Pearls Before Swine moved to Eau Gallie in 1963 and graduated Eau Gallie High School in 1965.
- Thomas Barbour, herpetologist, aged 14 years in 1898, lived in Eau Gallie with his grandmother.
- Zora Neale Hurston, author, lived in a cottage on Guava Avenue and Fifth Street twice, first in 1929 and again in 1951.
- Mark Boswell, film director, lived in a house at the corner of Pineapple Ave. and Montreal Blvd. from 1990 to 1992.

== See also ==
- Eau Gallie High School, originally on Pineapple Avenue, is named after this area
- Eau Gallie Public Library
- Eau Gallie Causeway
- Eau Gallie River
