= James Wadsworth Rossetter House =

- U.S. National Register of Historic Places
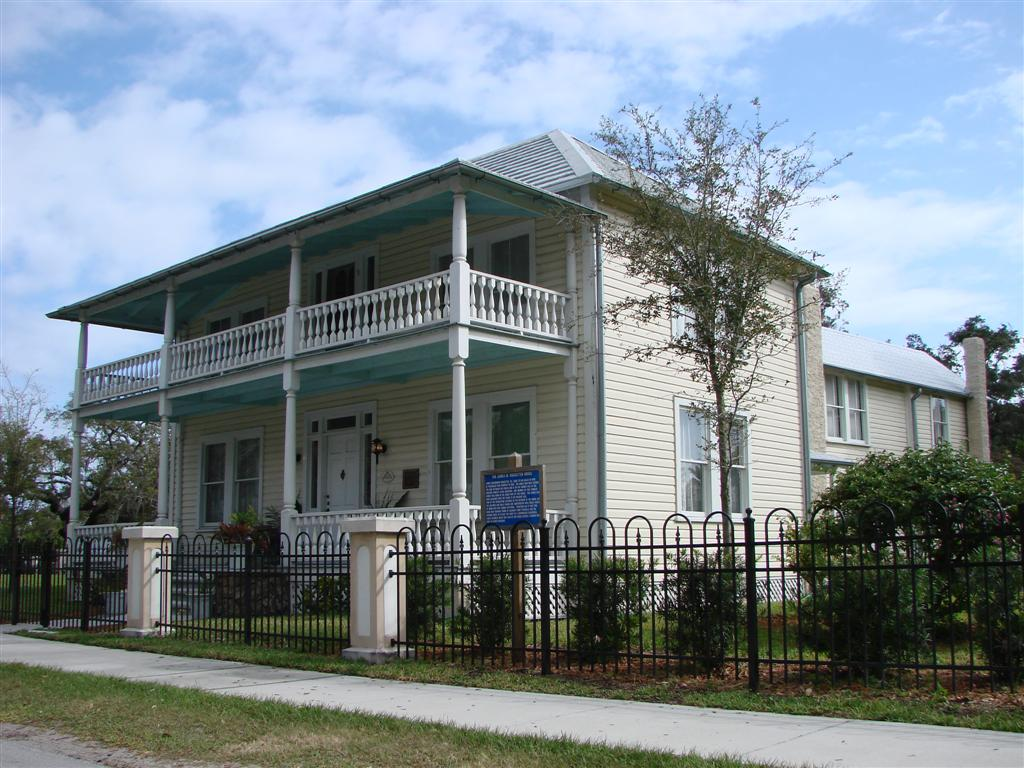

- Location within Florida Location within the United States
- Location: 1320 Highland Avenue; Melbourne, Florida, United States
- Coordinates: 28°7′42″N 80°37′34″W
- Built: c. 1860s & c. 1904
- NRHP reference No.: 05000734
- Added to NRHP: July 27, 2005

The James Wadsworth Rossetter House is a historic home in the U.S. located at 1320 Highland Avenue, Melbourne, Florida. The original address of the home was 1328 Houston Street. On July 27, 2005, it was added to the United States National Register of Historic Places. The house is owned by The Rossetter House Foundation, Inc., managed by the Florida Historical Society, and part of the Historic Rossetter House Museum.

The James and Ella Rossetter and their daughter Caroline arrived in Eau Gallie, Florida in 1902 and the family purchased the property for the house in 1904. Ella and Caroline donated the house and contents, including a collection of Victorian era antiques, to the Rossetter House Foundation.

== Gallery ==
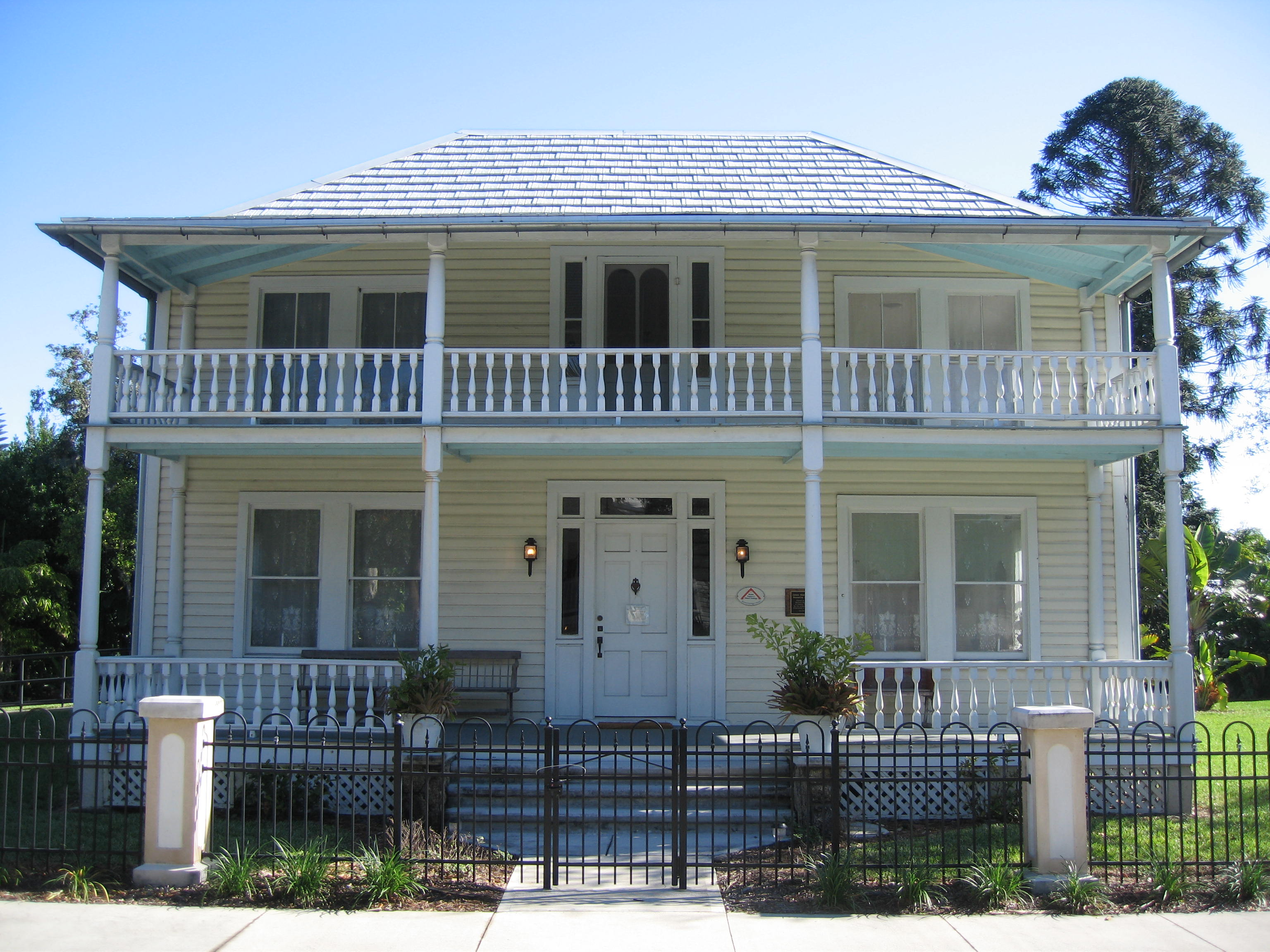
Front of James Wadsworth Rossetter House

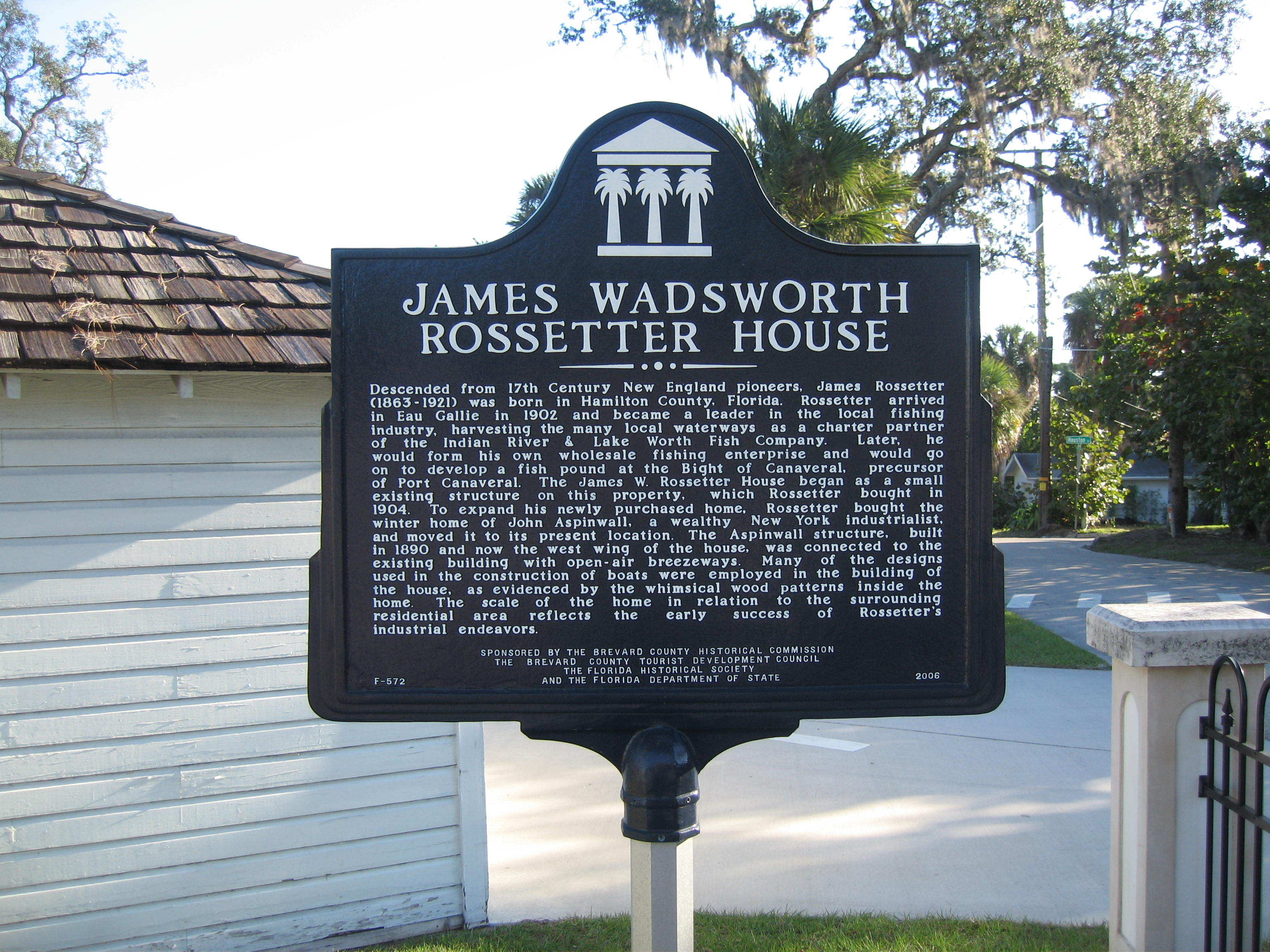
James Wadsworth Rossetter House Historical Marker
