= Florida Historical Society =

U.S. non-profit organization

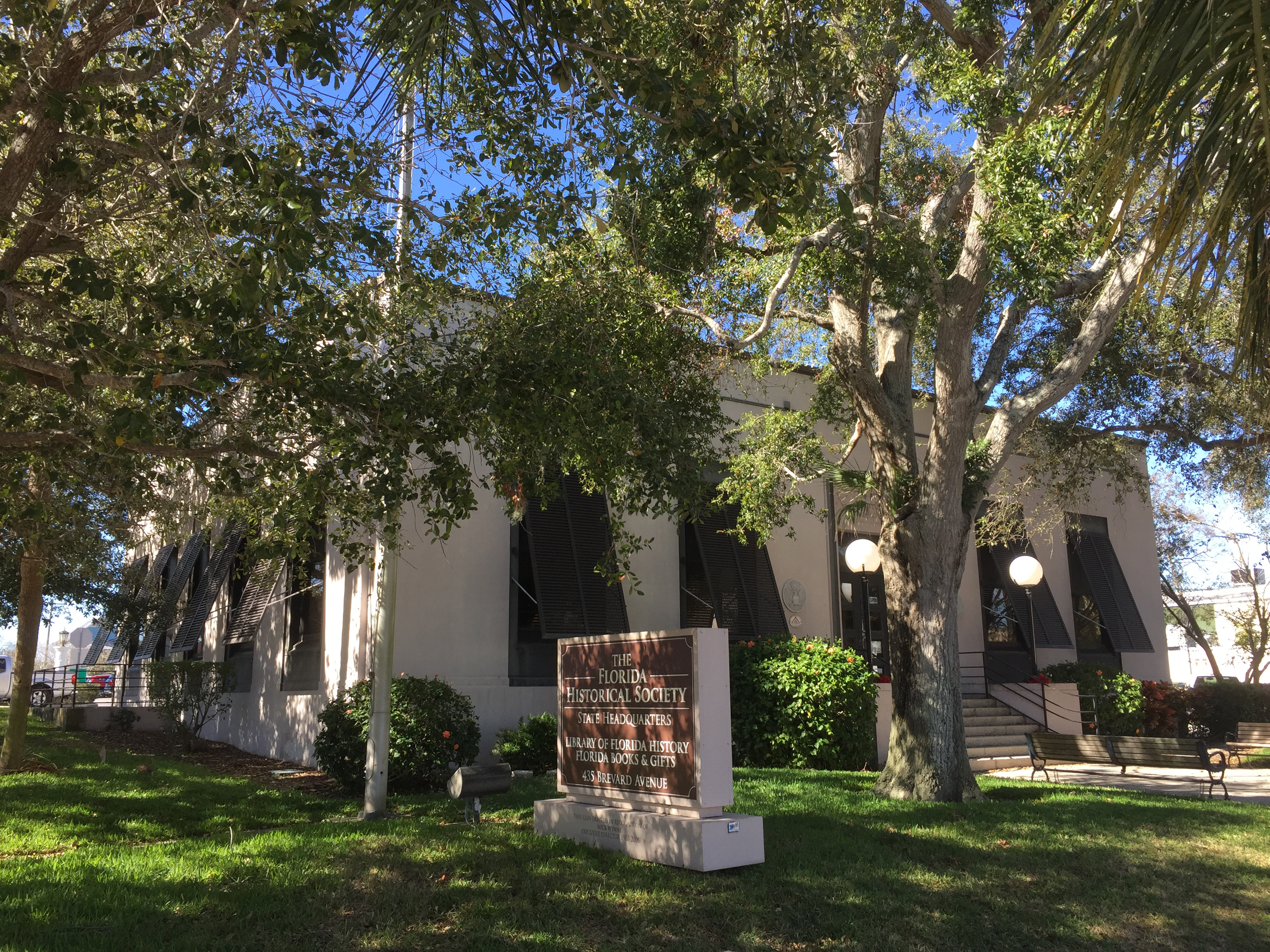
- Florida Historical Society State Headquarters and the Library of Florida History
- Formation: 1856; 170 years ago
- Type: Historical Society
- Headquarters: 435 Brevard Avenue; Cocoa, Florida
- President: Dr. Leonard Lempel
- Website: myfloridahistory.org

The Florida Historical Society (FHS) is an independent, member-supported, 501(c)(3) not-for-profit organization incorporated in 1856 to preserve Florida's history. It publishes the journal Florida Historical Quarterly, originally the Florida Historical Society Quarterly, an academic journal which releases new volumes four times a year, and manages the Library of Florida History. FHS has been publishing the Florida Historical Quarterly since 1908 and books since 1925. It publishes books, hosts talks, manages an annual conference, hosts the Florida Frontiers radio program and a tv program, and has an archaeological program with its own publication. Its library has a substantial collection of documents and books.

== History ==
Established in 1856, the Florida Historical Society is dedicated to preserving Florida's past through the collection and archival maintenance of historical documents and photographs, the publication of scholarly research on Florida history, and educating the public.

The society maintains an extensive archive at the Library of Florida History, publishes the Florida Historical Quarterly and books through the Florida Historical Society Press, manages the Historic Rossetter House Museum and Gardens, and operates the Florida Historical Society Archaeological Institute (FHSAI) at the Brevard Museum of History and Natural Science. FHSSI publishes Adventures in Florida archaeology and hosts talks.

FHS Press books are available online or through a book distributor. Authors can also submit manuscripts to the FHS Press through their website. FHS asks for authors to follow the FHS Press guidelines before making a submission.

The Florida Historical Society collects, preserves and publishes materials relating to the history of Florida and its denizens. After being reorganized in 2002, the Society began annual meetings to provide a forum for professional historians, and others interested in Florida History. People also have the option to become members of FHS.

Nick Wynne was the executive director from 1987 until 2008.

== Library of Florida History ==
Since 1905, the society has maintained the Library of Florida History. The general collection houses over 8,000 bound volumes, many rare manuscripts and postcards, over 1,000 early Florida maps and early colonial period (1500-1800) maps, soil surveys, and over 10,000 photographs of old Florida. There is an online catalog that may be used to search the collection. The FHS catalog is made available through PastPerfectOnline. There are some finding guides created by volunteers that are available for manuscripts housed at the library. Finding guides provide information about their manuscripts such as their scope and content, organization, provenance, restrictions, subject headings, and much more. An incomplete list of their manuscript holdings is available at their website. Currently, in-person research at the library is by appointment only. This gives the archivist the opportunity to pull the requested material for you. Appointments can be made over the phone or by email. Researchers are asked to provide their area of research and when they would like to come in. The library also houses the original copies of the Florida State Genealogical Society's Pioneer Descendant certificate program applications which can be accessed by appointment. Normal operating hours are Tuesday – Saturday from 10:00 a.m. to 4:30 p.m.

FHS offers various opportunities for volunteers and interns. Volunteers can help with cataloging and creating finding guides for the Library of Florida History's manuscripts. Volunteers can also help at the Rossetter House Museum and Gardens. Interns can help with archiving or the radio program.

The first collection was housed in the Cordova Hotel in St. Augustine, Florida, before moving to Jacksonville, Gainesville, Tampa, and currently located in Cocoa, Florida, since 1997. The library is housed in a 1939 historic United States post office, constructed by the Work Projects Administration, in Historic Cocoa Village, in Brevard County, Florida.

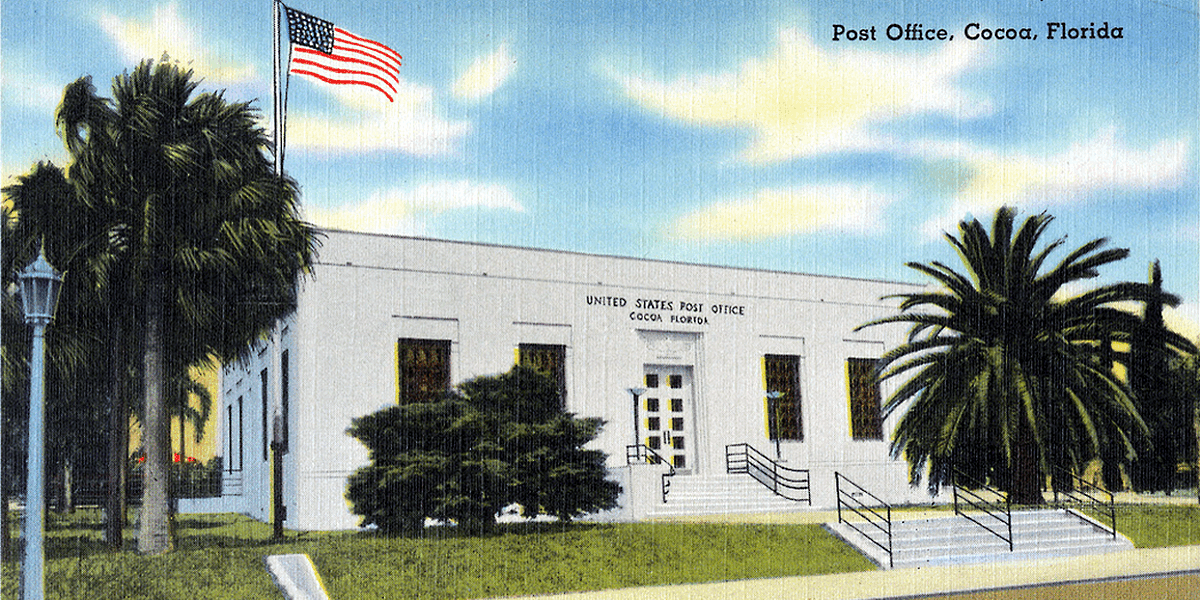
This is a rendering of the historical 1939 U.S. Post Office building in Cocoa, Florida, that currently houses the Florida Historical Society and the Library of Florida History.

Henry Flagler, the American industrialist and railway magnate, donated one of the first books to the Library of Florida History's collection: a 1605 first edition of the book La Florida del Inca and the Struggle for Equality in Colonial Spanish America written by a Peruvian named Garcilaso de la Vega. La Florida del Inca chronicles the Florida expedition of Hernando de Soto, a Spanish conquistador and explorer.

== Society activities ==
The Florida Historical Society hosts two major conferences each year: the Florida Historical Society Annual Meeting and Symposium, which is held every October on the University of Central Florida campus in Orlando, as well as the Florida Historical Society Public History Forum, which is held in May at various locations across Florida. The annual meeting and symposium features academic paper presentations and panel discussions from a range of professional historians, graduate students, among others, who have been selected to present through a juried process. The public history forum also features presentations and panels on Florida history, and often includes a tour of local historic sites, museums, and archives.

In addition, the Historical Society also presents a weekly, half-hour radio magazine entitled the Florida Frontiers, which covers Florida history, heritage, and cultural tourism opportunities across the state. FHS has been airing their radio program since 2009. Patrons can access the radio program both through the Historical Society website, broadcast on radio stations across the state, or through iTunes and other podcasting apps. Episodes on their website are tagged by subject so users can easily locate them.

FHS also produces the Florida Frontiers TV show. Previously aired episodes can be accessed on the FHS website or through YouTube. Topics cover historical events, historical figures, archaeological discoveries, Florida cultural heritage institutions, and much more. Guests include historians, archaeologists, architects, and various other subject experts.

Articles from the Florida Frontiers blog are published in Florida Today and can be found at the FHS website. Articles provide a wealth of knowledge about numerous topics related to Florida history.

FHSAI initiatives include releasing publications, giving talks, and discussing the latest archaeological discoveries on FHS's programs. FHS has also been publishing the FHSAI Adventures in Florida Archaeology Magazine since 2016 and it is released annually. The magazine can be accessed at their website.

Florida Frontiers is sponsored by the Division of Historical Resources, Florida's Space Coast Office of Tourism, the Jessie Ball duPont Fund, and the Rossetter House Foundation.

The Florida Historical Society also coordinates educational outreach projects and programs, which include active participation in events and festivals throughout the state, frequent public talks on a variety of subjects, workshops for teachers and students, history-based theatrical presentations, exhibits, and much more.

== See also ==
- List of historical societies in Florida
