= Turlington =

Turlington may refer to:

== People ==
- Christy Turlington (born 1969), American supermodel
- Ed Turlington, American lawyer
- Ralph Turlington (1920–2021), American politician

== Other ==
- Turlington Building, Florida, United States
- Turlington Hall, Florida, United States
- Turlington, North Carolina, United States
- Turlington's Balsam, patent medicine
