= 2004 United States Senate election in Florida =

- November 2, 2004
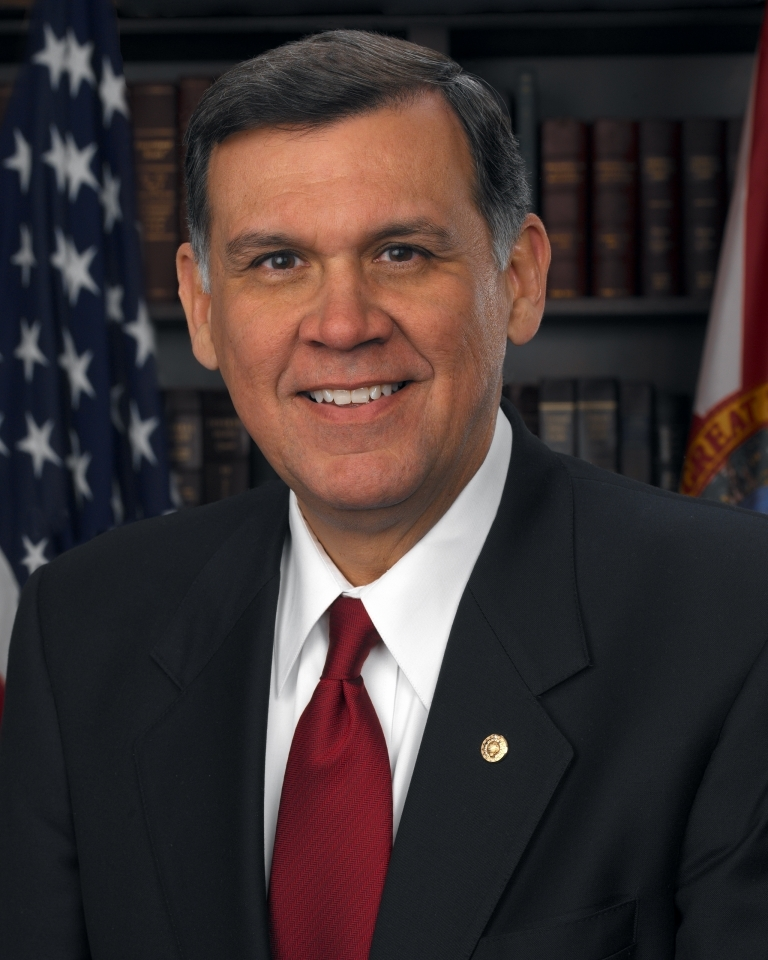

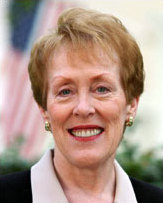
Nominee	Mel Martínez	Betty Castor
Party	Republican	Democratic
Popular vote	3,672,864	3,590,201
Percentage	49.43%	48.32%
- County results Martinez: 40–50% 50–60% 60–70% 70–80% Castor: 40–50% 50–60% 60–70% 70–80%
U.S. senator before election
Bob Graham
Democratic
Elected U.S. Senator
Mel Martínez
Republican

The 2004 United States Senate election in Florida took place on November 2, 2004, alongside other elections to the United States Senate in other states, elections to the United States House of Representatives, and various state and local elections. Democratic incumbent Bob Graham ran unsuccessfully for president of the United States instead of seeking a fourth term. Mel Martínez won the open race to succeed Graham over Betty Castor.

Primary elections were held on August 31, 2004. Castor defeated U.S. representative Peter Deutsch to win the Democratic nomination, while Martínez won the Republican nomination over 2000 nominee Bill McCollum and businessman Doug Gallagher with the support of President George W. Bush.

In the general election, Martínez won the open seat with 49.4 percent of the vote to 48.3 percent for Castor. This was the first open election for this seat since 1974 and the closest race of the 2004 United States Senate elections. As of 2026, this is the last election in which an incumbent senator opted not to run for re-election in Florida.

== Democratic primary ==
=== Candidates ===
- Betty Castor, former president of the University of South Florida, former education commissioner of Florida, and former state senator
- Peter Deutsch, U.S. representative from Broward County
- Bernard Klein, businessman
- Alex Penelas, mayor of Miami-Dade County

==== Declined ====
- Bob Graham, incumbent U.S. senator since 1987 and former governor

=== Results ===
County results

Democratic primary results
Party	Candidate	Votes	%
Democratic	Betty Castor	669,346	58.1%
Democratic	Peter Deutsch	321,922	27.9%
Democratic	Alex Penelas	115,898	10.1%
Democratic	Bernard E. Klein	45,347	3.9%
Total votes		1,152,513	100.0%

== Republican primary ==
=== Candidates ===
- Johnnie Byrd, state representative from Plant City and speaker of the Florida House of Representatives
- Doug Gallagher, businessman
- Larry Klayman, attorney
- William Kogut
- Sonya March
- Mel Martínez, former U.S. secretary of Housing and Urban Development and candidate for lieutenant governor in 1994
- Bill McCollum, former U.S. representative from Longwood and nominee for U.S. Senate in 2000
- Karen Saull

==== Withdrew ====
- Mark Foley, U.S. representative from Jupiter (withdrew September 6, 2003)
- Daniel Webster, state senator from Clermont
- Dave Weldon, U.S. representative from Indialantic

=== Campaign ===
An early contender for the Republican nomination was U.S. Representative Mark Foley, who raised $3 million for his Senate campaign and was seen as marginally more moderate than his opponents. However, longstanding rumors regarding Foley's sexuality came under scrutiny in the alternative press. While Foley denounced the rumors in an unusual press conference, he did not deny them, instead arguing that his sexuality had no bearing on his ability as a legislator. Foley withdrew from the campaign on September 6, 2003, citing his father's diagnosis with cancer. Foley would later resign from office in 2006 and come out as "a gay man" after revelations that he had sent explicit sexual messages to teenage boys who had served as congressional pages.

Martínez was supported by the Bush administration.

=== Results ===
County results

Republican primary results
Party	Candidate	Votes	%
Republican	Mel Martínez	522,994	44.9%
Republican	Bill McCollum	360,474	30.9%
Republican	Doug Gallagher	158,360	13.6%
Republican	Johnnie Byrd	68,982	5.9%
Republican	Karen Saull	20,365	1.8%
Republican	Sonya March	17,804	1.5%
Republican	Larry Klayman	13,257	1.1%
Republican	William Billy Kogut	3,695	0.3%
Total votes		1,165,931	100.0%

== General election ==
=== Candidates ===
- Dennis Bradley, activist (Veterans)
- Betty Castor, former president of the University of South Florida, former education commissioner of Florida, and former state senator (Democratic)
- Mel Martínez, former U.S. secretary of Housing and Urban Development and candidate for lieutenant governor in 1994 (Republican)

=== Predictions ===
Source	Ranking	As of
Sabato's Crystal Ball	Lean R (flip)	November 1, 2004

=== Polling ===
Poll source	Date(s) administered	Sample size (Note: Key: A – all adults RV – registered voters LV – likely voters V – unclear)	Margin of error	Betty Castor (D)	Mel Martínez (R)	Other	Undecided
Reuters/Zogby International	October 29 – November 1, 2004	601 (LV)	± 4.1%	43%	48%	1%	9%
FOX News/Opinion Dynamics	October 30–31, 2004	700 (LV)	± 3.0%	47%	41%	–	12%
SurveyUSA (Note: Poll conducted for WFLA-TV, WTLV, WKMG-TV, WPTV-TV, WFOR-TV, and WKRG-TV)	October 29–31, 2004	738 (LV)	± 3.7%	48%	48%	4%	–
Strategic Vision (R)	October 29–31, 2004	801 (LV)	± 3.0%	45%	49%	–	6%
InsiderAdvantage	October 29–31, 2004	400 (LV)	± 5.0%	47%	46%	1%	7%
Reuters/Zogby International	October 28–31, 2004	600 (LV)	± 4.0%	46%	46%	–	7%
CNN/USA Today/Gallup	October 28–31, 2004	1,138 (LV)	± 4.0%	48%	46%	–	5%
CNN/USA Today/Gallup	October 28–31, 2004	1,300 (RV)	± 3.0%	48%	45%	–	7%
Quinnipiac University	October 27–31, 2004	1,098 (LV)	± 3.0%	44%	49%	–	6%
Reuters/Zogby International	October 27–30, 2004	600 (LV)	± 4.1%	48%	45%	2%	5%
Reuters/Zogby International	October 26–29, 2004	601 (LV)	± 4.1%	47%	46%	2%	5%
Reuters/Zogby International	October 25–28, 2004	601 (LV)	± 4.1%	45%	47%	2%	6%
Mason-Dixon (Note: Poll sponsored by The Tampa Tribune and WFLA-TV)	October 26–27, 2004	625 (LV)	± 4.0%	46%	47%	–	6%
Strategic Vision (R)	October 25–27, 2004	801 (LV)	± 3.0%	46%	49%	–	5%
Reuters/Zogby International	October 24–27, 2004	601 (LV)	± 4.1%	45%	45%	1%	9%
The New York Times	October 23–27, 2004	802 (LV)	± 3.0%	47%	44%	–	10%
Reuters/Zogby International	October 23–26, 2004	601 (LV)	± 4.1%	48%	45%	–	7%
Quinnipiac University	October 22–26, 2004	944 (LV)	± 3.2%	46%	49%	–	5%
Reuters/Zogby International	October 22–25, 2004	601 (LV)	± 4.1%	47%	47%	–	6%
Strategic Vision (R)	October 22–24, 2004	801 (LV)	± 3.0%	46%	48%	–	6%
InsiderAdvantage	October 22–24, 2004	400 (LV)	± 5.0%	44%	46%	–	10%
SurveyUSA	October 22–24, 2004	738 (LV)	± 3.7%	50%	47%	3%	–
Reuters/Zogby International	October 21–24, 2004	601 (LV)	± 4.1%	44%	47%	1%	8%
Schroth, Eldon & Associates (D)/ The Polling Company (R) (Note: Poll sponsored by The Miami Herald and St. Petersburg Times)	October 19–21, 2004	800 (LV)	± 3.5%	44%	44%	–	12%
Research 2000 (Note: Poll sponsored by Sun-Sentinel)	October 18–21, 2004	600 (LV)	± 4.0%	48%	48%	–	4%
Strategic Vision (R)	October 18–20, 2004	801 (LV)	± 3.0%	45%	48%	–	7%
Quinnipiac University	October 15–19, 2004	808 (LV)	± 3.5%	47%	47%	–	5%
Quinnipiac University	October 15–19, 2004	1,208 (RV)	± 2.8%	41%	43%	1% (Note: "Wouldn't vote" with 1%)	15%
SurveyUSA	October 15–17, 2004	596 (LV)	± 4.1%	47%	49%	3%	1%
Mason-Dixon	October 14–16, 2004	625 (LV)	± 4.0%	45%	45%	1%	9%
University of North Florida	October 10–15, 2004	614 (LV)	± 4.0%	38%	35%	4% (Note: "Other" and "Refused" with 2%)	23%
Strategic Vision (R)	October 12–14, 2004	801 (LV)	± 3.0%	47%	47%	–	6%
Strategic Vision (R)	October 4–6, 2004	801 (LV)	± 3.0%	48%	45%	–	7%
Mason-Dixon (Note: Poll sponsored by The Tallahassee Democrat)	October 4–5, 2004	625 (LV)	± 4.0%	41%	46%	1%	12%
Quinnipiac University	October 1–5, 2004	717 (LV)	± 3.7%	47%	48%	–	5%
Quinnipiac University	October 1–5, 2004	1,083 (RV)	± 3.0%	44%	40%	2% (Note: "Someone else" and "Wouldn't vote" 1%)	14%
SurveyUSA	October 1–3, 2004	706 (LV)	± 3.8%	46%	50%	3%	1%
CNN/USA Today/Gallup	September 18–22, 2004	674 (LV)	± 4.0%	51%	45%	–	4%
CNN/USA Today/Gallup	September 18–22, 2004	843 (RV)	± 4.0%	49%	43%	–	8%
Quinnipiac University	September 18–21, 2004	819 (RV)	± 3.4%	43%	42%	1%	14%
SurveyUSA	September 12–14, 2004	602 (LV)	± 4.1%	49%	45%	5%	1%
Rasmussen Reports	August 24, 2004	500 (LV)	± 4.5%	44%	44%	–	12%

Hypothetical polling

Betty Castor vs. Bill McCollum

Poll source	Date(s) administered	Sample size	Margin of error	Betty Castor (D)	Bill McCollum (R)	Other	Undecided
Rasmussen Reports	August 24, 2004	500 (LV)	± 4.5%	42%	39%	–	19%

Peter Deutsch vs. Mel Martínez

Poll source	Date(s) administered	Sample size	Margin of error	Peter Deutsch (D)	Mel Martínez (R)	Other	Undecided
Rasmussen Reports	August 24, 2004	500 (LV)	± 4.5%	39%	47%	–	14%

Peter Deutsch vs. Bill McCollum

Poll source	Date(s) administered	Sample size	Margin of error	Peter Deutsch (D)	Bill McCollum (R)	Other	Undecided
Rasmussen Reports	August 24, 2004	500 (LV)	± 4.5%	37%	44%	–	19%

=== Endorsements ===
Betty Castor (D)

Newspapers

- Boca Raton News
- Bradenton Herald
- Citrus County Chronicle
- The Daytona Beach News-Journal
- Florida Today
- The Ledger
- The Miami Herald
- The Palm Beach Post
- Sarasota Herald-Tribune
- South Florida Sun Sentinel
- St. Petersburg Times
- Tallahassee Democrat
- The Tampa Tribune
- Treasure Coast Newspapers (Port St. Lucie News, Press Journal, The Stuart News, Tribune)
Mel Martínez (R)

Newspapers

- The Florida Times-Union
- Naples Daily News
- The News-Press
- Orlando Sentinel

== Results ==
United States Senate election in Florida, 2004
Party	Candidate	Votes	%	±%
Republican	Melquíades Rafael Martínez Ruiz	3,672,864	49.43%	+11.90%
Democratic	Elizabeth Castor	3,590,201	48.32%	−14.15%
Veterans	Dennis F. Bradley	166,642	2.24%	N/A
Write-ins		187	0.00%	+0.00%
Majority		82,663	1.11%	−23.83%
Turnout		7,429,894	70.92%	
Total votes		7,429,894	100.00%	
Republican gain from Democratic		Swing		

=== Results by county ===
2004 United States Senate election in Florida (by county)
County	Mel Martínez Republican		Betty Castor Democratic		Various Candidates Other parties		Margin		Total votes cast
County	#	%	#	%	#	%	#	%	Total votes cast
Alachua	43,074	39.63%	63,809	58.71%	1,802	1.65%	-20,735	-19.08%	108,685
Baker	6,815	69.16%	2,853	28.95%	186	1.89%	3,962	40.21%	9,854
Bay	49,639	67.63%	22,190	30.23%	1,564	2.13%	27,449	37.40%	73,393
Bradford	6,534	60.83%	3,938	36.66%	270	2.51%	3,596	24.17%	10,742
Brevard	142,394	54.44%	111,477	42.62%	7,682	2.94%	30,917	11.82%	261,553
Broward	231,266	33.63%	442,728	64.37%	13,780	2.00%	-211,462	-30.74%	687,774
Calhoun	3,133	53.70%	2,526	43.30%	175	3.00%	607	10.40%	5,834
Charlotte	43,079	55.48%	32,837	42.29%	1,729	2.23%	10,242	13.19%	77,645
Citrus	33,998	49.68%	31,699	46.32%	2,742	4.01%	2,299	3.36%	68,439
Clay	58,131	72.24%	20,831	25.89%	1,503	1.86%	37,300	46.35%	80,465
Collier	81,948	65.97%	40,332	32.47%	1,934	1.56%	41,616	33.50%	124,214
Columbia	14,014	57.15%	9,780	39.89%	726	2.96%	4,234	17.26%	24,520
DeSoto	4,994	53.58%	4,031	43.25%	295	3.17%	963	10.33%	9,320
Dixie	3,322	52.67%	2,735	43.36%	250	3.97%	587	9.31%	6,307
Duval	205,001	54.68%	163,748	43.68%	6,160	1.64%	41,253	11.00%	374,909
Escambia	88,787	63.56%	48,274	34.56%	2,632	1.88%	40,513	29.00%	139,693
Flagler	18,294	48.13%	18,812	49.49%	904	2.38%	-518	-1.36%	38,010
Franklin	2,706	47.13%	2,886	50.26%	150	2.61%	-180	-3.13%	5,742
Gadsden	5,230	25.15%	15,246	73.33%	316	1.52%	-10,016	-48.18%	20,792
Gilchrist	4,060	58.87%	2,578	37.38%	258	3.74%	1,482	21.49%	6,896
Glades	2,147	52.15%	1,821	44.23%	149	3.62%	326	7.92%	4,117
Gulf	4,086	57.36%	2,858	40.12%	180	2.53%	1,228	17.24%	7,124
Hamilton	2,206	44.75%	2,597	52.68%	127	2.58%	-391	-7.93%	4,930
Hardee	4,024	56.38%	2,806	39.32%	307	4.30%	1,218	17.06%	7,137
Hendry	5,350	55.75%	4,027	41.97%	219	2.28%	1,323	13.78%	9,596
Hernando	36,557	46.08%	39,634	49.96%	3,143	3.96%	-3,077	-3.88%	79,334
Highlands	22,326	54.72%	17,196	42.15%	1,278	3.13%	5,130	12.57%	40,800
Hillsborough	207,331	46.29%	230,298	51.42%	10,261	2.29%	-22,967	-5.13%	447,890
Holmes	5,114	63.42%	2,608	32.34%	342	4.24%	2,506	31.08%	8,064
Indian River	34,338	57.82%	23,511	39.59%	1,543	2.60%	10,827	18.23%	59,392
Jackson	10,449	53.73%	8,605	44.24%	395	2.04%	1,844	9.49%	19,449
Jefferson	2,722	36.93%	4,504	61.10%	145	1.97%	-1,782	-24.17%	7,371
Lafayette	1,768	54.57%	1,390	42.90%	82	2.53%	378	11.67%	3,240
Lake	68,425	56.37%	49,635	40.89%	3,319	2.73%	18,790	15.48%	121,379
Lee	139,810	59.90%	89,048	38.15%	4,531	1.94%	50,762	21.75%	233,389
Leon	45,453	34.09%	86,180	64.64%	1,691	1.27%	-40,727	-30.55%	133,324
Levy	8,735	53.39%	7,129	43.57%	497	3.04%	1,606	9.82%	16,361
Liberty	1,448	48.75%	1,459	49.12%	63	2.12%	-11	-0.37%	2,970
Madison	3,318	40.58%	4,640	56.74%	219	2.68%	-1,322	-16.16%	8,177
Manatee	72,829	51.53%	64,795	45.85%	3,699	2.62%	8,034	5.68%	141,323
Marion	73,530	53.23%	60,814	44.02%	3,799	2.75%	12,716	9.21%	138,143
Martin	39,076	55.41%	29,868	42.35%	1,579	2.23%	9,208	13.06%	70,523
Miami-Dade	367,867	49.21%	366,482	49.02%	13,202	1.77%	1,385	0.19%	747,551
Monroe	18,075	47.19%	18,961	49.50%	1,267	3.31%	-886	-2.31%	38,303
Nassau	21,893	68.40%	9,519	29.74%	595	1.86%	12,374	38.66%	32,007
Okaloosa	65,146	74.71%	19,645	22.53%	2,413	2.77%	45,501	52.18%	87,204
Okeechobee	5,959	50.00%	5,464	45.84%	496	4.16%	495	4.16%	11,919
Orange	188,121	49.15%	187,549	49.00%	7,081	1.85%	572	0.15%	382,751
Osceola	42,103	52.00%	36,569	45.16%	2,296	2.84%	5,534	6.84%	80,968
Palm Beach	200,442	37.96%	318,042	60.23%	9,566	1.81%	-117,600	-22.27%	528,050
Pasco	89,400	48.01%	90,761	48.74%	6,044	3.24%	-1,361	-0.73%	186,205
Pinellas	197,640	42.55%	254,451	54.78%	12,379	2.66%	-56,811	-12.23%	464,470
Polk	108,774	52.28%	93,231	44.81%	6,051	2.91%	15,543	7.47%	208,056
Putnam	15,941	52.23%	13,701	44.89%	876	2.87%	2,240	7.34%	30,518
St. Johns	56,251	66.19%	27,319	32.14%	1,420	1.67%	28,932	34.05%	84,990
St. Lucie	44,436	45.34%	50,660	51.69%	2,905	2.96%	-6,224	-6.35%	98,001
Santa Rosa	49,149	74.65%	15,165	23.03%	1,524	2.31%	33,984	51.62%	65,838
Sarasota	95,425	50.08%	91,651	48.10%	3,455	1.81%	3,774	1.98%	190,531
Seminole	102,898	56.11%	76,579	41.76%	3,914	2.13%	26,319	14.35%	183,391
Sumter	17,929	57.05%	12,844	40.87%	656	2.09%	5,085	16.18%	31,429
Suwannee	9,095	58.45%	6,069	39.00%	397	2.55%	2,629	19.45%	15,561
Taylor	4,241	50.17%	3,972	46.98%	241	2.85%	269	3.19%	8,454
Union	2,874	62.49%	1,632	35.49%	93	2.05%	1,242	27.00%	4,599
Volusia	104,032	46.21%	114,932	51.05%	6,174	2.74%	-10,900	-4.84%	225,138
Wakulla	5,240	45.10%	6,048	52.05%	331	2.85%	-808	-6.95%	11,619
Walton	16,038	68.56%	6,770	28.94%	585	2.50%	9,268	39.62%	23,393
Washington	6,414	63.45%	3,452	34.15%	242	2.39%	2,962	29.30%	10,108
Totals	3,672,864	49.43%	3,590,201	48.32%	166,829	2.24%	82,663	1.11%	7,429,894

Counties that flipped from Democratic to Republican

- Calhoun (largest city: Blountstown)
- Citrus (largest city: Homosassa Springs)
- Dixie (largest city: Cross City)
- Glades (largest city: Moore Haven)
- Gulf (largest city: Port St. Joe)
- Levy (largest city: Williston)
- Putnam (largest city: Palatka)
- Taylor (largest city: Perry)
- Jackson (largest city: Marianna)
- Lafayette (largest city: Mayo)
- Union (largest city: Lake Butler)
- Washington (largest city: Chipley)
- Brevard (largest municipality: Palm Bay)
- Okeechobee (largest municipality: Okeechobee)
- Polk (largest municipality: Lakeland)
- Miami-Dade (largest city: Miami)
- Osceola (largest municipality: Kissimmee)
- Orange (largest city: Orlando)
- Escambia (largest city: Pensacola)
- Hendry (largest city: Clewiston)
- Marion (largest city: Ocala)
- Hardee (largest city: Wachula)
- Highlands (largest city: Sebring)
- Indian River (largest city: Sebastian)
- Lake (largest city: Clermont)
- Lee (largest city: Cape Coral)
- Suwannee (largest city: Live Oak)
- Duval (largest municipality: Jacksonville)
- Charlotte (largest city: Charlotte)
- Columbia (largest city: Lake City)
- DeSoto (largest city: Arcadia)
- Gilchrist (largest city: Trenton)
- Sumter (largest city: The Villages)
- Bradford (largest city: Starke)
- Baker (largest city: Macclenny)
- Bay (largest city: Panama City)
- Clay (largest city: Lakeside)
- Holmes (largest city: Bonifay)
- Manatee (largest city: Bradenton)
- Martin (largest city: Palm City)
- Nassau (largest city: Yulee)
- St. Johns (largest city: St. Johns)
- Walton (largest city: Miramar Beach)
- Seminole (largest municipality: Sanford)

== See also ==
- 2004 United States Senate elections

== Notes ==
Partisan clients
