= Eleazer Foster =

American lawyer (1841–1899)

7th Florida Superintendent of Public Instruction
- In office 1881–1884
- Governor: William D. Bloxham
- Preceded by: William Penn Haisley
- Succeeded by: Albert Jonathan Russell

Personal details
- Born: October 31, 1841 Connecticut, U.S.
- Died: December 8, 1899 (aged 58) Florida, U.S.
- Parent: Eleazer Kingsbury Foster (father)
- Education: Yale University
- Occupation: Attorney

Eleazer Kingsbury Foster, Jr. (October 31, 1841 – December 8, 1899) was an American lawyer, state attorney, Superintendent of Florida Schools from 1881 until 1884, and judge.

He was born in Connecticut, one of the sons of Eleazer Kingsbury Foster. He studied at the Collegiate and Commercial Institute of New Haven and graduated from Yale University in 1863. After being admitted to the Connecticut Bar in 1865 he moved to Florida for health reasons in 1866. In 1867 Eleazer K. Foster Jr. registered to vote in Saint Johns County.

He was appointed as State Superintendent of Public Instruction in 1881 by Florida governor William D. Bloxham. He served until 1884.

He represented Henry Sanford, including in land purchases, and worked as a lawyer in Sanford, Florida. A tribute was paid to him in the Alachua County court system upon news of his death.

== See also ==
- Florida Department of Education
