= Rafael Martinez =

Rafael Martinez may refer to:

- Rafael E. Martinez (born 1950), American lawyer
- Rafael Martínez (gymnast) (born 1983), Spanish artistic gymnast
- Rafael Martínez Aguilera, also known as Rafa Martínez (born 1982), Spanish basketball player
- Rafael Martínez Nadal (1877–1941), third president of the Senate of Puerto Rico
- Rafael Martínez Torres (born 1959), Puerto Rican jurist
- Rafael Martinez (politician) (1873–1953), Filipino politician
- Rafael Martínez (racing driver) (born 1962), Mexican racing driver
- Rafael Martínez (athlete), Cuban discus thrower, see Athletics at the 1930 Central American and Caribbean Games
