= William Henry Gleason =

American politician (1829–1902)

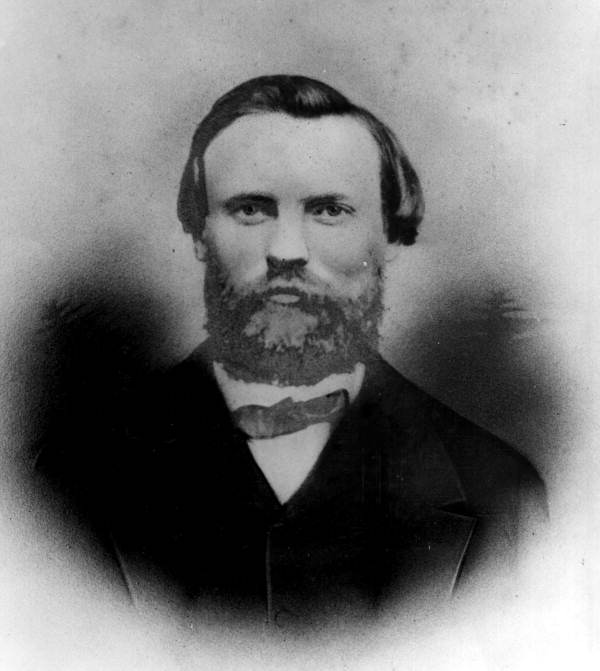

2nd Lieutenant Governor of Florida
- In office July 7, 1868 – December 14, 1868
- Governor: Harrison Reed
- Preceded by: William W. J. Kelly
- Succeeded by: E. C. Weeks

Member of the Florida House of Representatives from Dade County
- In office 1871–1875
- Preceded by: Isaiah Hall
- Succeeded by: William Watkin Hicks

Personal details
- Born: June 28, 1829 Richford, New York, U.S.
- Died: November 8, 1902 (aged 73) Eau Gallie, Florida, U.S.
- Party: Republican
- Spouse: Sara Griffin (m. 1858; born August 15, 1838 - died December 13, 1912)
- Children: William Henry Hunt Gleason (1862–1949); Captain George Griffin Gleason (1865–1918)
- Profession: Lawyer, real estate developer

William Henry Gleason (June 28, 1829 – November 8, 1902) was an American politician from Florida. He was Florida's second lieutenant governor, and he was very briefly acting governor.

== Early life ==
William Henry Gleason was born in 1829 in Richford, New York. He had an early interest in engineering, banking, law and politics. In 1855, he opened a bank and began to develop the town of Eau Claire, Wisconsin. In 1858, he married Sara Griffin from New York. Gleason learned from his banking experience and moved into sales during the Civil War.

== Florida ==
The issue of slavery concerned Gleason, and he was appointed a special agent of the Freeman's Bureau in 1865. His mission was to scout the Florida peninsula as a possible site for a Negro colony. The idea of colonization did not appeal to Gleason. His recommendation against a Negro colony in Florida garnered local political support in future years.

Having toured the state for several months, Gleason was one of the early post-war visitors to realize the great potential for business. He rented a schooner and moved his family to the old military post, Fort Dallas, in 1866 (near present-day Miami).

This time featured great transition in Florida. Gleason sought investment land under control of the state's Trustee's of the Internal Improvement Fund and proposed to ditch and drain land in exchange for bargain rates on nearby real estate. The board originated in Congress with the 1850 Internal Improvement Act that granted certain swamp and overflow lands to the states. Florida received millions of acres, and not all was swamp.

The mission of the Trustees of the Internal Improvement Trust Fund was to work with private companies to improve the state. Developers like Gleason were allowed to purchase 640 acres (260 ha) of state land for $40 in consideration for every 50,000 cubic feet (1,400 m^{3}) of ditching completed. This amounted to just over six cents per acre and provided an 800% return on investment if the land could be resold at fifty cents per acre.

In 1875, Gleason became interested in a canal project to connect Indian River with Lake Washington. He proposed to rechannel and deepen Eau Gallie's Elbow Creek and extend the waterway to Lake Washington. The state's payment for this work was set at $4000 plus 4,000 acres (1,600 ha) for every mile (10 km² per km) of canal constructed. This project never materialized, however a drainage canal was cut (the Hopkins ditch) along this route, named after its promoter George W. Hopkins (1844-1925) who had purchased over 10,000 acres (40 km^{2}).

=== George W. Hopkins ===
While commencing the lumber business in Florida, Hopkins completed a drainage canal in 1909, now called Hopkins Canal, along present day Aurora Road between Lake Washington and the Eau Gallie River. The general idea and location of a navigable canal near the Hopkins Canal was first proposed by Gleason in 1871. After passage of the Drainage District Act in 1913, Hopkins organized a huge drainage project. Hopkins founded Deer Park, Florida, with his daughter Agnes's husband, William H. Kempfer. The Kempfer Cattle Company still exists in Deer Park. Hopkins also founded the eponymous town of Hopkins, Florida.

=== Politics ===
During the late 1860s and 1870s, Gleason traveled between his Fort Dallas residence and Tallahassee, seeking business and political connections. As a consequence of this and a few powerful Republican friends, on July 7, 1868, he was sworn in as the state's second lieutenant governor. During an attempted impeachment of Governor Harrison Reed, Gleason claimed the governorship. The Florida Senate had adjourned on November 7, 1868, without deciding whether or not to impeach Reed. Reed's supporters, including the state's Adjutant General and the county sheriff, kept him out of the capitol. Gleason set himself up in a hotel and signed documents as governor. The Florida Supreme Court sided with Governor Reed, and the political struggle ended with Gleason's removal from the Lieutenant Governor position December 14, 1868.

Traveling along Florida's coast, Gleason passed many charming harbors. He liked one such area so much that he purchased most of it (16,000 acres (6,500 ha)) at $1.25 an acre and renamed it Eau Gallie, having been formerly called Arlington by its founder John Caroll Houston IV.

Gleason prepared a plat of his new land, which encompassed the entire area from Indian River Lagoon to Lake Washington, approximately thirty square miles. William Lee Apthorp's 1877 Standard Map of Florida shows Eau Gallie in large capital letters, incorrectly designating Gleason's land as the county seat of Brevard County. Part of Gleason's land eventually became the city of Eau Gallie and later north Melbourne.

During the contentious 1876 presidential election, Gleason reportedly held up the certification of Florida's results. Shortly after the election, it was determined that there was a tie in Florida but also that the returns from Dade County had not been counted. After several attempts by the governor to obtain Dade County's returns, locals realized that Gleason had possession of them but had forgotten to mail them before going on a hunting expedition. The twenty-eight votes determined who Florida's electoral votes went for, though the final decision was ultimately made by a bipartisan commission who considered the returns from Florida, Louisiana, and South Carolina.

=== Post Civil War ===
In 1871, Gleason proposed the idea of the state's first Agricultural College to be located in the Eau Gallie section of Melbourne, Florida. Gleason offered a 2,320-acre (940 ha) donation of intermittent swamp lands east of Lake Washington to the Trustees of the Florida Agricultural College if they would select Eau Gallie as the school's campus. Records indicate that Gleason later received $100 from the state for two Eau Gallie lots to be used as sites for college building. The site was approved and the two-story coquina building was completed in 1875, but it was never used for its intended purpose. Remnants of the old campus are located off of present day Pineapple Avenue (formerly part of U.S. 1), north of Eau Gallie Boulevard. The college reemerged in the north Florida town of Lake City under Democratic leadership during 1884.

Sensing legal difficulties in Dade County, Gleason moved his wife and two teenage sons to the unused campus of Eau Gallie's Agricultural College during 1882 and 1883 and began a sawmill and boat-building business. The Gleasons' took control of the old college building and lived there until they became established. By 1884, Henry and Sara Gleason had recorded the village of Eau Gallie and began selling allotments.

The Florida State Agricultural College filed to foreclose on Gleason's claim to the vacant college building. After several years of litigation, the trustees of the college negotiated a settlement. Gleason's "donated" west Eau Gallie land was returned to him, and in exchange, the governor agreed to pay $2,000 for the small college building and campus.

Gleason and his sons converted the building into the prosperous Hotel Granada during the 1890s. It served the typical tourists of the day, sportsmen seeking fish and game. The two-story coquina hotel was destroyed by fire in 1902. The charred building symbolized the end of an era which coincided with the death of the lieutenant governor the same year.

== Family ==
Gleason's younger son, Captain George Griffin Gleason, died in 1918 from pneumonia contracted when he had Spanish flu. Captain G.G. Gleason's nephew William Lansing Gleason (son of William Henry Hunt Gleason) co-founded Indian Harbour Beach, Florida on June 6, 1955.

== External references ==
- Gleason Family papers
- Brevard County Property Appraiser
- Melbourne Bicentennial Book. July 4, 1976. Noreda B. McKemy and Elaine Murray Stone; Library of Congress 76-020298
- Indian Harbour Beach Homepage
- Morris, Allen and Joan Perry Morris, compilers. The Florida Handbook 2007-2008 31st Biennial Edition. Page 312. Peninsula Publishing. Tallahassee. 2007; ISBN 978-0-9765846-1-2 Softcover ISBN 978-0-9765846-2-9 Hardcover.
- Political Graveyard - Death Information
- William Henry Gleason at Find a Grave

Political offices
Preceded by William W. J. Kelly	Lieutenant Governor of Florida; 1868–1869	Succeeded by E. C. Weeks
Preceded by Isaiah Hall	Member of the Florida House of Representatives from Dade County; 1871–1875	Succeeded by William Watkin Hicks
