= Florida Department of Education =

State education agency of Florida

Department overview
- Formed: 1870
- Jurisdiction: Florida
- Headquarters: Tallahassee, Florida, U.S.
- Employees: 2,500+ (2006-7)
- Annual budget: $23 billion
- Department executive: Henry Mack, Florida Commissioner of Education
- Website: www.fldoe.org

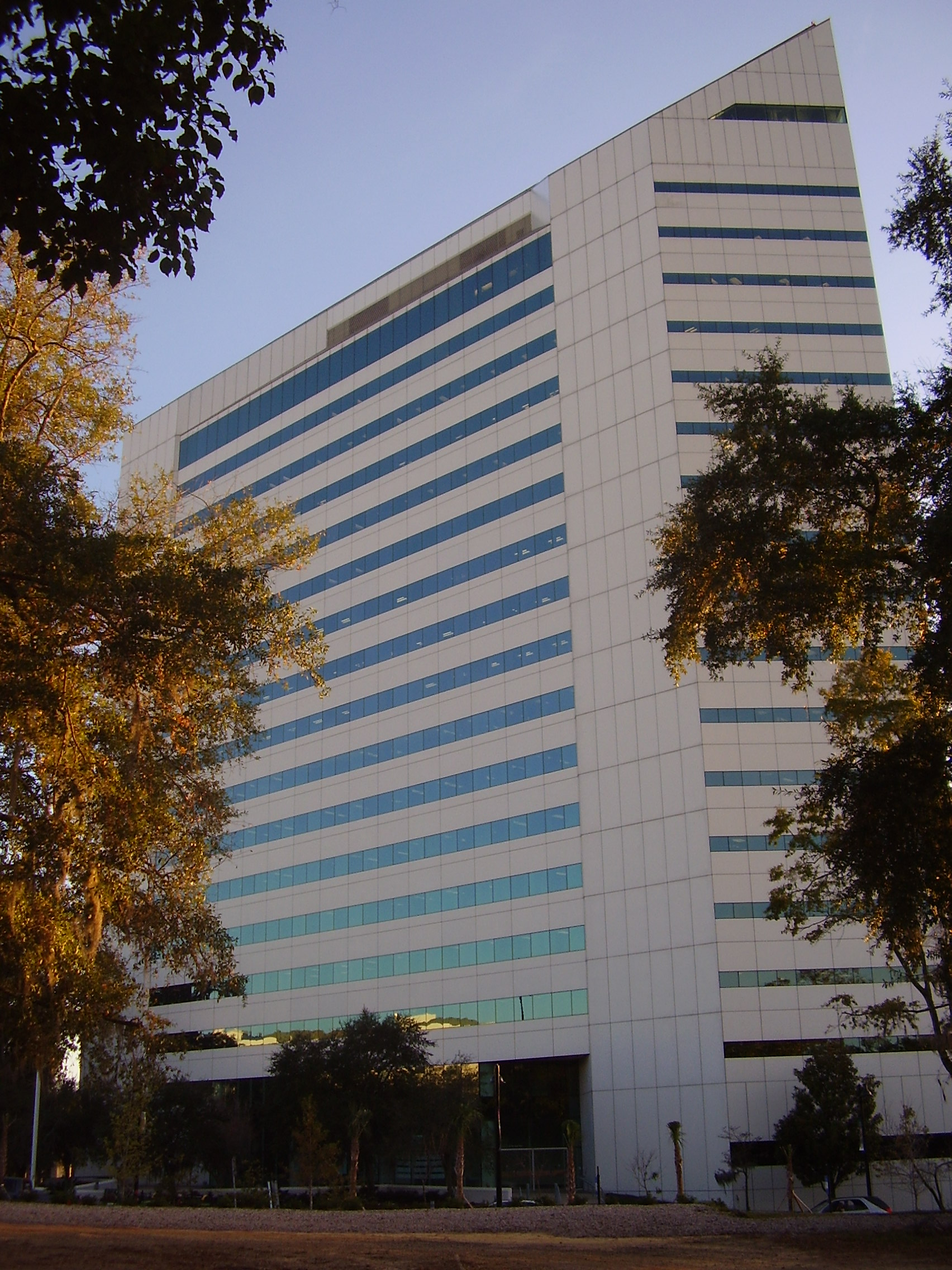
Turlington Building, the headquarters

The Florida Department of Education (FLDOE) is the state education agency of Florida. It governs public education and manages funding and testing for local educational agencies (school boards). It is headquartered in the Turlington Building (named for former education commissioner Ralph Turlington) in Tallahassee.

The Florida commissioner of education manages the day-to-day operation of the department. The office of education commissioner was originally a Cabinet-level position filled by direct election and directly responsible for education in Florida. The 2002 Florida Constitution Revision Commission submitted a revision to the Florida Constitution, amending Article IV, Section IV to reduce the Cabinet from six elected officials to three. The voters approved the changes and it became effective January 7, 2003; after this time, the commissioner of education became an appointed position and the FLDOE became the overall responsibility of the governor. The revised constitution also created a new Florida Board of Education with seven members (one of whom is the commissioner of education), appointed by the governor to oversee the Department of Education. Division of Vocational Rehabilitation - 930 positions Division of Blind Services - 300 positions Annual operating budget for all entities in 2012-13 - approximately $18.6 billion Oversee 28 locally governed public state colleges and 47 school district technical centers

The department supports approximately 2.8 million students, 4,471 public schools, 28 colleges with 175 locations, 340,000 full-time, and 243,654 professors, administrators, and instructional staff.

The department manages the Florida Information Resource Network (FIRN), which provides Internet access to public schools.

== History ==
The superintendent of public instruction was established to oversee Florida's public schools in the 1868 Florida Constitution. The elected officeholder became the commissioner of education under the 1968 Florida Constitution. A constitutional amendment in 1998 made effective January 2003 reorganized the office so its head was no longer elected and created a State Board of Education.

In 2022, the Florida Department of Education rejected a record 41% of mathematics textbooks for non-compliance with the state's new B.E.S.T. Standards, which replace Common Core. The department claimed that the books rejected "incorporate prohibited topics or unsolicited strategies", including critical race theory (CRT), social–emotional learning (SEL), and Common Core. Commissioner of Education Richard Corcoran stated that the state is aiming to prevent "indoctrination or exposure to dangerous and divisive concepts in our classrooms". The state did not provide any specific examples of content that led to the books being rejected. The state later approved 19 previously-rejected books, after claiming that publishers "made fixes" that removed "woke content."

In May 2022, the state published records disclosing the results of the reviews, revealing that the majority of reviewers—largely educators—found no evidence of the textbooks containing CRT, but more often flagged for containing SEL. Most of the accusations of prohibited content came from Chris Allen—a vice chair of a chapter of the conservative group Moms for Liberty—who accused textbooks of promoting CRT because of its inclusion of data surrounding an implicit bias test and a statement that the United States had not "eradicated poverty or racism", complained of a word problem that involved the gender pay gap, objected to an author "[talking] about a climate crisis as if it’s a proven fact". and objected to questions involving elections and vaccines that did not include references to The Federalist Papers or natural immunity.

In October, 2022, the Florida Department of Education announced the selection of a 13-member working group, including educators and curriculum developers, as well as the financial experts, Dr. David Phelps and Kim Kiyosaki, that would develop the state's new financial literacy curriculum. This curriculum was later completed in 2023, and received support from notable celebrities, including Mark Cuban and Matt Higgins as part of a public relations campaign developed and executed by Spartan Media's Jeremy Knauff, to get students excited about and engaged with the new curriculum. In completing this initiative, Florida joined roughly half of US states that currently have a financial literacy component to their public education curriculum.

== State exams ==
The State of Florida requires students to take the Florida Assessment of Student Thinking (FAST) each year in grades 3-10. Students' results from the FAST are compiled to generate a grade for each public school under former governor Jeb Bush's "A+ Plan." Under this plan, public schools receive a letter grade from A to F, depending on student performance and the degree to which the bottom 25% of the school has improved compared to its past performances. The higher a public school scores, the more funding it receives.

In addition to testing in general, every year, students take the SAT or and even the ACT as the main exams for the entire continent of North America. Exclusively to Florida, the state of education rewards students with the Bright Futures Scholarship in two tiers that include test scores. In tier one, the Florida Academic Scholarship awards full tuition to any Florida state college as long as you have at least a 3.5 unweighted GPA, 100 volunteer hours, and the appropriate Sat or Act score for the specific school calendar year. The Florida Medallion Scholarship awards 75 percent of tuition to any Florida college as long as you have at least a 3.0 unweighted gpa, 75 volunteer hours and the appropriate SAT or ACT score. Students who have gone to utilize their Bright Futures Scholarships typically choose to utilize it at a public 4-year university versus a private university or a 2-year university.

== Teacher certification ==
The department paid bonuses to teachers certified by the federal government. Up until 2025, the bonus was as much as $3,000 to $7800 annually. In addition, teachers with certain speciaties in the STEM area or special education may also receive bonuses to their salary. This is expected to diminish with diminished income to the state.

== School funding ==
For the longest time, Florida had a reduced lunch system for students in public schools with low income from grades K-12. In recent news, a massive issue has shown that federal funding has been cut for several school counties such as Broward, Duval, and Pasco, counties, for example. Students heavily depended on free lunch in order to prevent empty stomachs for learning. Even though not all counties are eliminating any chance of reduced or free lunch, it would be necessary that free lunch for students should remain a permanent thing for the foreseeable future.

In general, schools in Florida have continued to rapidly grow in terms of participation and demand. From the article, "Accounting for Higher Education Accountability: Political Origins of State Performance Funding for Higher Education", it states that education is highly demanded that the costs be lowered and the funding increases so that this type of branch is heavily prioritized for the state's future. Things that could greatly increase as a result of improved funding is more hirings of instructors, increase class sizes, and having and overall improved school system for students to partake in.

== Superintendents of Public Instruction ==
1. C. Thurston Chase (1868–1870)
2. Henry Quarles (1870–1871)
3. Rev. Charles Beecher (1871–1873)
4. Jonathan C. Gibbs (1873–1874)
5. William Watkin Hicks (1875–1876)
6. William Penn Haisley (1877–1881)
7. Eleazer K. Foster (1881–1884)
8. Albert Jonathan Russell (1884–1893)
9. William N. Sheats (1893–1905) and (1913–1922)
10. William M. Holloway (1905–1913)
11. William S. Cawthon (1922–1937)
12. Colin English (1937–1949)
13. Thomas D. Bailey (1949–1965)
14. T. D. Johnson (1965)
15. Floyd Thomas Christian (Supt. of Public Instruction 1965–1969; Commissioner of Education in 1969–1974)

== Commissioners of Education ==
1. Ralph Turlington (1974–1986)
2. Betty Castor (1986–1994)
3. Doug Jamerson (1994–1995)
4. Frank Brogan (1995–1999)
5. Tom Gallagher (1999–2001)
6. Charlie Crist (2001–2003)
7. Jim Horne (2003–2004)
8. John L. Winn (2004–2007)
9. Jeanine Blomberg (interim) (2007)
10. Eric J. Smith (October 5, 2007 – June 10, 2011)
11. Gerard Robinson (June 11, 2011 – 2012)
12. Tony Bennett (January – August 2013)
13. Pam Stewart (August 2013 – January 8, 2019)
14. Richard Corcoran (January 8, 2019 – May 1, 2022)
15. Jacob Oliva (interim) (May 1, 2022 – June 1, 2022)
16. Manny Díaz Jr. (June 1, 2022 – July 11, 2025)
17. Anastasios Kamoutsas (July 12, 2025 – July 6, 2026)
18. Paul O. Burns (interim) (July 6, 2026 - July 31, 2026
19. Henry Mack (August 3, 2026 – present)

== See also ==
- Education in Florida
- FEAP
- Florida College System
- Florida Board of Governors
- State University System of Florida
- Florida Comprehensive Assessment Test
- List of colleges and universities in Florida
