= Union Cypress Company =

Union Cypress Company Railroad
Overview
- Headquarters: Melbourne, Florida
- Locale: west from Melbourne, Florida
- Dates of operation: 1912–1932

Technical
- Track gauge: 4 ft 8 1/2 in (1,435 mm) standard gauge

The Union Cypress Company operated a three-story double-band sawmill in Melbourne, Florida, built in 1912. The small company town of Hopkins (now South Melbourne), named after its owner George W. Hopkins, was built at the site. The company built a private railroad, often known as the Union Cypress Company Railroad, west from a connection with the Florida East Coast Railway in Melbourne across the St. Johns River to Deer Park. From there, where the logging operation was based, branch lines fanned out into the bald cypress swamps.

Other stations along the line were Grass Mere or Omega, 1.5 miles east of the county line between Osceola County and Brevard County, Agnes, about a mile west of the St. Johns River, Alpha, just east of the St. Johns River, Patterson (now June Park), just east of Interstate 95 (SR 9), and Gagner (now West Melbourne), a couple miles from the east end.

The Kissimmee-Melbourne Road (part of the Dixie Highway, later SR 24, now US 192 (SR 500)), which opened in 1918, was closed in 1923 and 1924 for repairs. During that time, the company carried automobiles across the swamps for $1 each.

The mill burned down in August 1919, following a large fire that February in downtown Melbourne. A new fireproof mill was begun but never completed, and the company shut down in 1925 after George W. Hopkins died.

In 1924, the company received a contract to provide lumber for the first bridge between Titusville and Merritt Island.

The Foshee Manufacturing Company took over operations and rebuilt the railroad in 1928, but the Great Depression hit and put the operation out of business. The buildings and railroad were torn down and sold in 1932.

Many supports from the old trestle across the St. Johns River remain, as do a few of the old company buildings at the Melbourne end.

Union Cypress Railroad
