= David McClain =

David McClain may refer to:

- David McClain (president), president of the University of Hawaii System
- David McClain (Florida politician) (born 1933), American politician
- Dave McClain (American football) (1938–1986), American football coach
- Dave McClain (drummer) (born 1965), American heavy metal drummer
