= W. P. Haisley =

Florida educator

6th Superintendent of Public Instruction of Florida
- In office 1877–1881
- Preceded by: William W. Hicks
- Succeeded by: Eleazer Foster

Personal details
- Born: William Penn Haisley; December 22, 1831; Wayne County, Indiana, U.S.
- Died: 1906 (aged 74–75)
- Education: McKendree College; Harvard Law School

William Penn Haisley (December 22, 1831 – 1906) was Florida's school superintendent. He served as principal of the South Florida Male and Female Institute in Tampa which transitioned quickly into a free school.

He was born into a Quaker family in Wayne County, Indiana and named for the Quaker founder of Pennsylvania. He studied at McKendree College in Lebanon, Illinois. He graduated from Harvard Law School in 1861.

He served as Florida's superintendent of schools from 1877 until 1881. He was succeeded by Eleazer Foster.

== See also ==
- Florida Department of Education
