= C. Thurston Chase =

American educator

Cornelius Thurston Chase (1819–1870), originally of Massachusetts, was Florida's first Superintendent of Public Instruction and wrote a book about schoolhouses and cottages in the south as well as a book on school law of Florida. A statewide system of public education was established in the 1868 Florida Constitution. The Library of Congress has a collection of his family's papers.

His father was also a clergyman named Cornelius Chase (1780–1868).

Florida's school system was in rough shape when Chase was appointed in the wake of the American Civil War. His work included establishing the first school superintendents and school boards in Florida counties.

An annual report draft from 1870 and letterbooks from his tenure are part of the Florida Office of Commissioner of Education archives.

His son, Cornelius Thurston Chase, attended New York University, was the class poet for three consecutive, then went on to Divinity School at Chicago Theological Seminary and in Berlin, before becoming pastor of a Congregational Church in Flatbush, Brooklyn, NY. His grandson, Cornelius Thurston Chase, Jr., was headmaster of the Eaglebrook School in Massachusetts.
