= Orlando Junior College =

Christian college in Orlando, Florida

Coordinates: 28.5579°N 81.3720°W

- Orlando, Orange County, Florida; United States

Information
- Established: 1941
- Founder: Judson Walker
- Closed: 1970 (became Lake Highland Prep)

Orlando Junior College was a private, segregated junior college in Orlando, Florida, that served white Christians only.

Founded by Judson Walker, Orlando Junior College opened in 1941 on the grounds of the former Magnolia School, explicitly excluding Black and Jewish students.

In 1944, the school moved to a 20-acre site on Lake Highland. In 1957, the school was offered $1 million by Martin Company on condition that Blacks and Jews would be admitted; the board refused.

In 1967, the founding of Valencia College and other public institutions challenged the continued viability of the school. Orlando Junior College became Lake Highland Prep in 1970.

== Notable alumni ==
- Mel Martínez, Cuban-American politician, Secretary of Housing and Urban Development under President George W. Bush former chair of the Republican National Committee.
