= Lake Highland Preparatory School =

Private school in Orlando, Florida, US

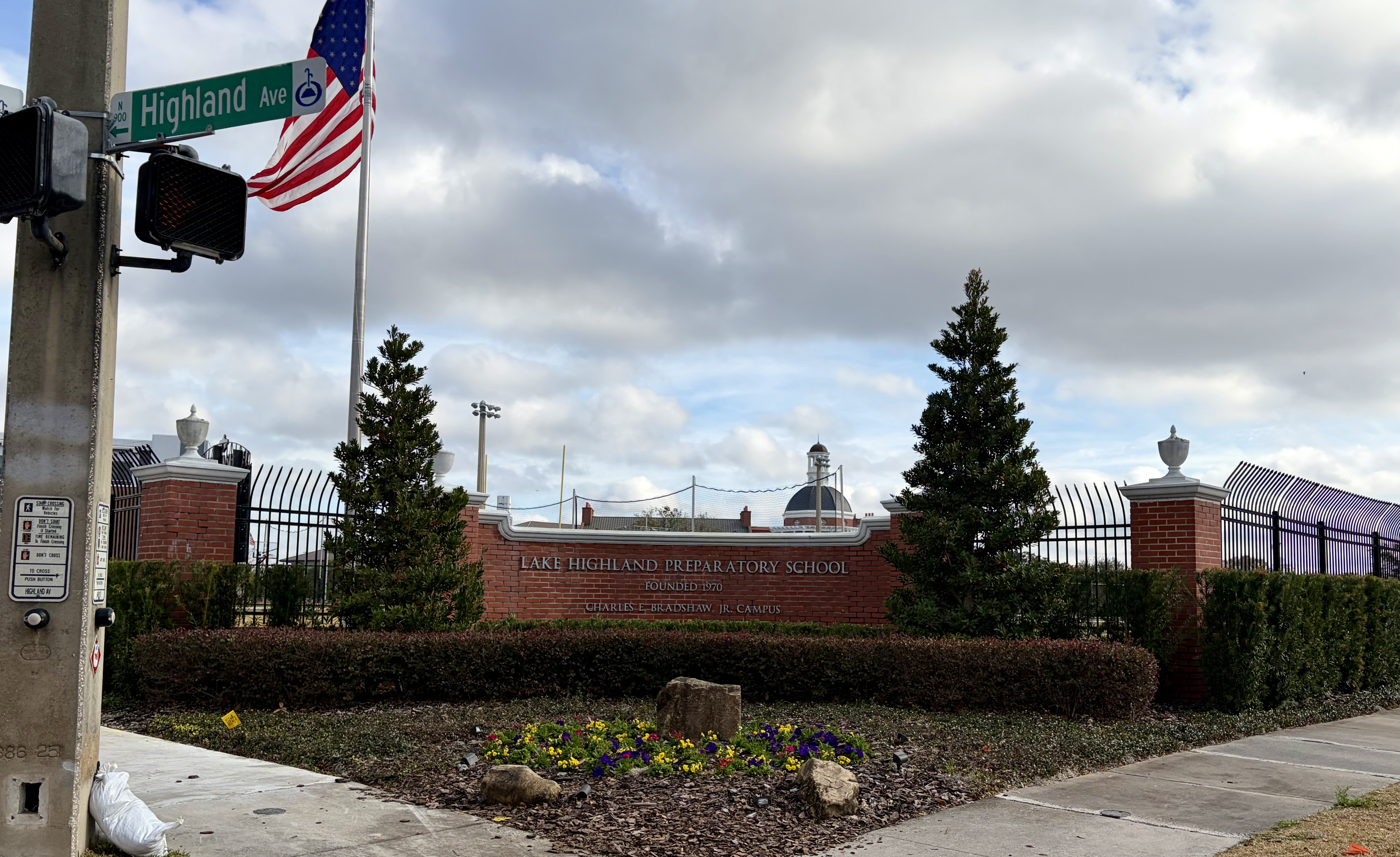
- Lake Highland Prep's Bradshaw campus

Location
- 901 Highland Avenue; Orlando, Florida 32803; United States; 28.558°N 81.372°W

Information
- Opened: 1970
- NCES School ID: 00263194
- President: Jim McIntyre
- Director: Jonathan Hiett (Upper School), Alison Murphy (Middle School), and Stacey Hendershot (Lower School)
- Teaching staff: 161.0 (on an FTE basis)
- Grades: PK-12
- Enrollment: 2,008 (2023–24)
- Student to teacher ratio: 12.5
- Campus size: 42 acres (17 ha)
- Colors: Red and White
- Team name: Highlanders
- Accreditation: Cognia
- Publication: By Any Other Name
- Newspaper: Twice-Told Tale
- Yearbook: Lakhischan
- Annual tuition: $29,650
- Website: www.lhprep.org
- Last updated: November 2025

Lake Highland Preparatory School is a private, coeducational school in Orlando, Florida. As of 2025, it is the largest private school in Orlando and the fifth-largest in the state. It serves grades pre-K through 12, separated into lower (grades pre-K to 6), middle (grades 7–8), and upper schools (grades 9–12).

It was founded as an all-white school in 1970 by the board of a whites-only, Christians-only junior college. This gave white parents a private-school alternative after federal courts ordered the racial integration of public schools. LHPS remained all-white for some years, but by 2020, the student body was about one-third minority.

The 42-acre (17 ha) main campus is next to Lake Highland in a residential section of downtown Orlando. The school also has a middle school campus (Charles Clayton Campus) for grades 7 and 8.

Lake Highland is accredited by the Florida Council of Independent Schools and Cognia. The school is also a member of the National Association of Independent Schools.

== History ==
Lake Highland Preparatory School traces its origins to Orlando Junior College, which was established in 1941 "as a private community college to serve white residents". By the 1960s, the junior college's board of trustees had rejected at least two deals that would have given money to the school if it began admitting black and Jewish students, including an offer of $1 million (roughly $10,600,000 today) from defense contractor Martin Company and a similar attempt two years later by the state of Florida. By the late 1960s, the school's enrollment had "declined dramatically" following the arrival of two public, integrated community colleges in the region. In 1969, OJC board members voted down a proposal to sell the campus to the expanding Valencia Junior College, electing instead to rebrand the junior college as College of Orlando—the school had long envisioned a shift to a four-year college—and to open a new private school for elementary, middle, and high schoolers.

Lake Highland Preparatory School opened in 1970 during the racial integration of Orlando-area public schools, following a pattern common to segregation academies. Plans for the school were publicly announced in February 1970; the chairman of the board of trustees, Joseph Guernsey, declined to comment when a reporter asked if the school was established to allow white parents to avoid racially integrated public schools. In August 1970, days before the school opened, headmaster Terrence O'Hara told a PTA meeting that an "air of uncertainty over public schools" contributed to the growing enrollment at racially segregated private schools like LHPS. O'Hara said, "Some parents don't even know what public school they are to send their children to" and this "confusion" meant the parents "felt more secure with their children in private schools."

Classes began on September 9, 1970, with 325 students in grades 1 to 12, including 23 seniors. None were black. Tuition was $425 per semester ($3,523 in today's dollars).

In March 1971, Chairman Guernsey announced that a fundraising drive had brought $300,000 in donations and pledges, that applications for enrollment were coming in so quickly that the student body might have to be capped at 800, and that tuition would increase to $550 per semester. He added that the junior college would close in August 1971, leaving the entire 26-acre campus to the prep school.

O'Hara left the headmaster's post after a year, as did his successor, Lowell Keene.

In 1972, the school found the man who would lead it into its second decade. As superintendent of Orange County Public Schools, James Higginbotham had resisted court orders to desegregate Robinswood Middle School and Carver Middle School. In May, Higginbotham resigned his county job to accept the newly created post of LHPS president. On his first day in his new job, he gave a speech in which he denounced the court order desegregating public schools, saying that "an era was dying" because of "legalistic do-gooders."

In 1976, a school spokesperson said black students were welcome, but none had ever applied or enrolled.

In 1981, Guernsey stepped down as board chairman. He was succeeded by Charles E. Bradshaw Jr., who had joined the board of the whites-only junior college in the late 1960s and subsequently helped lead the drive to establish the prep school. Bradshaw would serve as chair until 2005. The Upper and Lower School campus was renamed for him in 2011.

Higginbotham died in office in 1982; he was succeeded as school president by Charles Millican, founding president of what is today University of Central Florida. Alfred Harms Jr., a retired vice admiral, became president in 2017.

During the 2019-2020 school year, its 1,950 students included 1,260 (65%) White, 430 (22%) Asian, 123 (6%) Black, 77 (4%), and 1 (0%) Native Hawaiian/Pacific Islander.

James McIntyre succeeded Harms as president in 2022.

As of the 2023–24 school year, the school reported a total student body of 2008 students.

== Athletics ==
LHPS athletic teams are called the Highlanders. Former head football coach Frank Prendergast serves as the school's athletic director. In 2012, 27 of the school's 200 graduating seniors signed to play for college teams. The Highlanders compete in various districts of the Florida High School Athletic Association: mostly 1A, but the football team competes in 2B and the basketball, baseball, softball, and soccer teams in 3A.

Most athletics facilities are located on campus. Football and soccer teams play on Holloway Field at CNL Stadium (often shortened to "CNL Stadium" or "the Field"), while the basketball and volleyball teams compete inside the Weng Family Gymnasium (commonly referred to as "the Gym"). The baseball team plays across from Lake Highland in the O'Meara sports complex.

Historically, Trinity Preparatory School has been Lake Highland's primary athletic rival, mirroring their academic rivalry. In 2023, Lake Highland moved out of Trinity's division, thus ending the annual football rivalry. Lake Highland and Trinity still participate in the same division in most other sports. Bishop Moore High School has supplanted Trinity as LHP's annual football rival.

Former major league baseball pitcher Frank Viola spent 10 years coaching at Lake Highland, six of them as head baseball coach.

Lake Highland Prep has 28 state championships across 11 sports. The boys wrestling team, which won in 2012, 2013, 2015, 2016, 2017, 2018, and 2019, holds the state tournament point-scoring records. Other state championships have been won in girls volleyball (2004, 2005, 2006, 2007, and 2008), girls basketball (1998, 2015, and 2016), girls softball (2002 and 2003), boys basketball (2013 and 2014), boys soccer (2019), girls soccer (2006), boys lacrosse (2011, 2013, 2014, and 2015), girls lacrosse (2019), girls swim (2004), and girls golf (2001).

The Archery program has won ten state championships in the Olympic Archery in Schools program and has advanced to state and national competitions through the USAA and NFAA programs, according to the school.

In May 2020, the school's wrestling program left the FHSAA in order to compete as an independent and with a national schedule starting with the 2020–2021 academic year. Lake Highland competed at tournaments in Ohio, Delaware, California, and Illinois during the 2019–2020 season. State guidelines only allow one meet per season outside Florida and neighboring states Georgia and Alabama. The move means the school will no longer compete for state titles, but instead compete at the National Prep Championships.

== Notable alumni ==
- Candice Accola, actress
- Annalena Baerbock, German politician, appointed Minister for Foreign Affairs in 2021
- Joel Berry II, basketball player for the North Carolina Tar Heels, McDonald's All-American and 3x Florida Mr. Basketball
- John Green, author and YouTuber
- Traylor Howard, television actress
- Dominique Rodgers-Cromartie, defensive back for the New York Giants (sophomore year only)
- Brice Sensabaugh, NBA basketball player, Utah Jazz
- Scott Stapp, lead singer of Creed
- Max Starks, a former offensive tackle for the Pittsburgh Steelers, San Diego Chargers, Saint Louis Rams, and Arizona Cardinals.
- Mark Tremonti, lead guitarist of Creed and Alter Bridge
- Ty Tryon, professional golfer
- Brittany Viola, NCAA champion diver
