= Betty Castor =

American politician

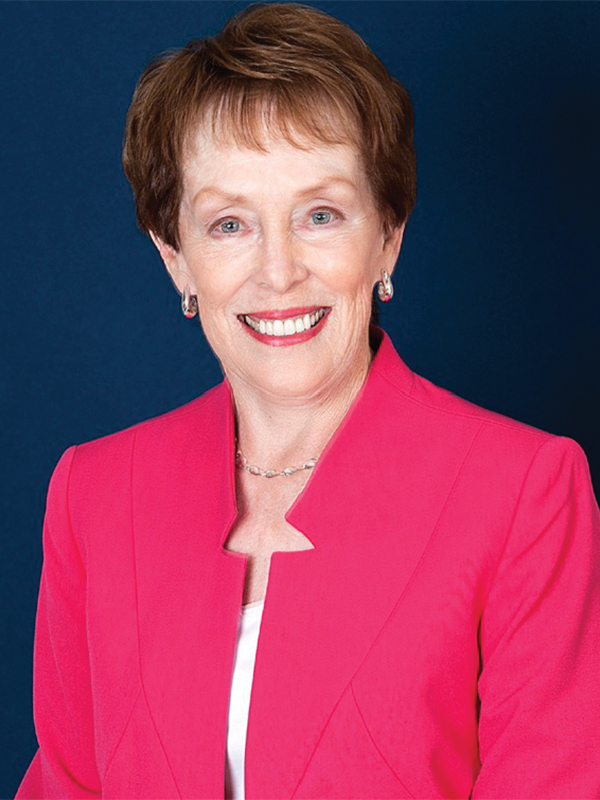

5th President of the University of South Florida
- In office January 18, 1994 – October 1, 1999
- Preceded by: Francis Borkowski
- Succeeded by: Judy Genshaft

Education Commissioner of Florida
- In office January 6, 1987 – January 3, 1994
- Governor: Bob Martinez; Lawton Chiles
- Preceded by: Ralph Turlington
- Succeeded by: Doug Jamerson

Member of the Florida Senate
- In office November 2, 1982 – November 4, 1986
- Preceded by: David McClain
- Succeeded by: John Grant
- Constituency: 21st district
- In office November 2, 1976 – November 7, 1978
- Preceded by: Julian Lane
- Succeeded by: Pat Frank
- Constituency: 23rd district

Personal details
- Born: Elizabeth Bowe; May 11, 1941 (age 85) Glassboro, New Jersey, U.S.
- Party: Democratic
- Spouses: Frank Castor (m. 1965; div. 1978) Sam Bell (m. 1989; died 2023)
- Children: 3, including Kathy and Karen
- Education: Rowan University (BA); University of Miami (MEd)

Elizabeth Castor (née Bowe; born May 11, 1941) is an American educator and former politician. Castor was elected to the Florida Senate and as Florida Education Commissioner, and she subsequently served as the president of the University of South Florida, and president of the National Board for Professional Teaching Standards.

Her public service included three terms in the Florida State Senate and one term as a Hillsborough County Commissioner. In 2004, she was the Democratic nominee for the open U.S. Senate seat of retiring Senator Bob Graham and was narrowly defeated by Mel Martínez.

After leaving elected politics, Castor was the director of the Patel Center for Global Solutions at the University of South Florida and later became chair of the J. William Fulbright Scholarship Board. She also works with Ruth's List Florida, a group dedicated to recruiting and aiding qualified Democratic women candidates, receiving the Architect of Change Award from them in May 2018.

== Early life and education ==
Castor was born and grew up in Glassboro, New Jersey, on May 11, 1941, the daughter of Gladys F. (née Wright) and Joseph L. Bowe. Her father was the mayor of Glassboro.

She attended Glassboro State College, now Rowan University, where earning her bachelor's degree. While at Glassboro, she was active in organizing a drive to support education in Uganda. President John F. Kennedy appointed her to a diplomatic mission to attend the independence celebrations in Kampala, Uganda, in 1962.

Following her graduation from Glassboro State in 1963, she attended Teachers College, Columbia University for a summer and then returned to Uganda, where she taught secondary school as part of the Teachers for East Africa program. While in East Africa, Castor participated in a project to help lead two dozen African school girls to the summit of Mount Kilimanjaro in Tanzania, the first all-female expedition to accomplish this.

She returned to the U.S. in 1965, and settled in Miami-Dade County, Florida, where she was a teacher while studying for her Master of Education degree at the University of Miami, which she received in 1968.

== Career ==
After receiving her master's degree from the University of Miami, Castor moved to Tampa, Florida, where she joined the League of Women Voters's Tampa chapter, and became its president in 1970. Castor's second daughter, Karen, was born in 1968 and her son, Frank, who currently serves as judge in Palm Beach County, Florida, in 1970.

In 1972, she ran for the Hillsborough County Commission. Castor faced ten opponents in the Democratic Primary and a general election opponent. She won all the contests, becoming the first woman ever elected to the County Commission. During her term, she chaired the Environmental Protection Commission and became chair of the Board of County Commissioners in 1976.

In 1976, she was elected to the state Senate and served until 1978, when she ran unsuccessfully for lieutenant governor. She was elected again to the Florida Senate in 1982 and became the president pro tempore of the Senate in 1985, the first woman to hold the post. Castor served on numerous education committees and became chair of the appropriations sub-committee on education. She was the co-sponsor of the Equal Rights Amendment (1977) and championed bills to end discrimination and fund spouse abuse centers statewide. She successfully sponsored legislation providing for the early childhood education program.

In 1986, Castor was elected statewide to the Florida Cabinet as Florida Education Commissioner, the first woman ever elected to the state cabinet. As commissioner of education, Castor served on the board of regents and as a member of the Community College Coordination Board. She worked with the legislature to fund the first statewide program to provide funding for the early childhood education program. She worked also with the insurance commissioner to develop the Healthy Kids program, providing health insurance for low-income children enrolled in public schools.

=== President of the University of South Florida ===
In 1994, Castor became the first female president of the University of South Florida (USF), one of the largest universities in the southeast with an enrollment of over 40,000 students, four campuses, and a medical school. During her tenure, USF gained the Research I designation and the endowment tripled from US$65 million to just over US$200 million. The Honors Program was expanded dramatically and a major expansion of residential on-campus housing was approved. USF joined its sister institution, the University of Central Florida, in creating an academic and economic partnership, the I-4 High Technology Corridor. She pursued international exchanges with institutions in China, led a delegation of faculty and staff to the African Economic Summit in Harare, Zimbabwe, and encouraged new opportunities for USF faculty to study abroad. Castor stepped down on October 1, 1999.

=== National Board for Professional Teaching Standards ===
From 1999 to 2002, Castor served as president for the National Board for Professional Teaching Standards. The mission of the board is to build a system of high standards for education and encourage teachers throughout America to pursue its rigorous certification process. The number of board certified teachers grew under Castor's leadership from about 2070 to 25,000 by 2003. Financial incentives were developed in 48 states and hundreds of school districts.

=== 2004 Senate campaign ===
In the 2004 Senate campaign, Castor faced two Democratic candidates, Miami-Dade County, Florida mayor Alex Penelas, U.S. Congressman Peter Deutsch, and businessman Bernard Klein in the Democratic primary election.

Castor won the Democratic nomination on August 31, but lost the general election to Republican Mel Martínez on November 2, 2004, 49.5% to 48.4%. The overwhelming support for Martínez among Latinos effectively counterbalanced Castor's relatively high popularity among swing voters throughout the state.

Castor was also voted to be an at-large Florida delegate to the 2004 Democratic National Convention.

=== Patel Center for Global Solutions ===
In January 2007, Castor was appointed executive director of the Patel Center for Global Solutions at the University of South Florida. In June 2009, she resigned as executive director of the Patel Center, returning her focus back to education and politics.

== Personal life ==
Castor married Donald Castor with whom she had three children: Kathy Castor, Karen Castor Dentel, and Frank Castor. Kathy Castor has been a member of the U.S. House of Representatives since 2007. Karen Castor Dentel is a former member of the Florida House of Representatives and current school board member of the Orange County Public Schools in Orlando, Florida since August of 2018. Frank Castor has served as a judge in Palm Beach County, Florida, since 2007.

Betty and Donald Castor divorced in 1978.

In 1989, Castor married Sam Bell, an attorney and lobbyist who had also served as a state legislator. He died in 2023, at the age of 83.

Political offices
Preceded by Ralph Turlington	Education Commissioner of Florida; 1987–1994	Succeeded by Doug Jamerson
Academic offices
Preceded by Francis Borkowski	President of the University of South Florida; 1994–1999	Succeeded by Judy Genshaft
Party political offices
Preceded by Ralph Turlington	Democratic nominee for Education Commissioner of Florida; 1986, 1990	Succeeded by Doug Jamerson
Preceded by Bob Graham	Democratic nominee for U.S. Senator from Florida (Class 3); 2004	Succeeded by Kendrick Meek
