= Doug Jamerson =

American politician (1947–2001)

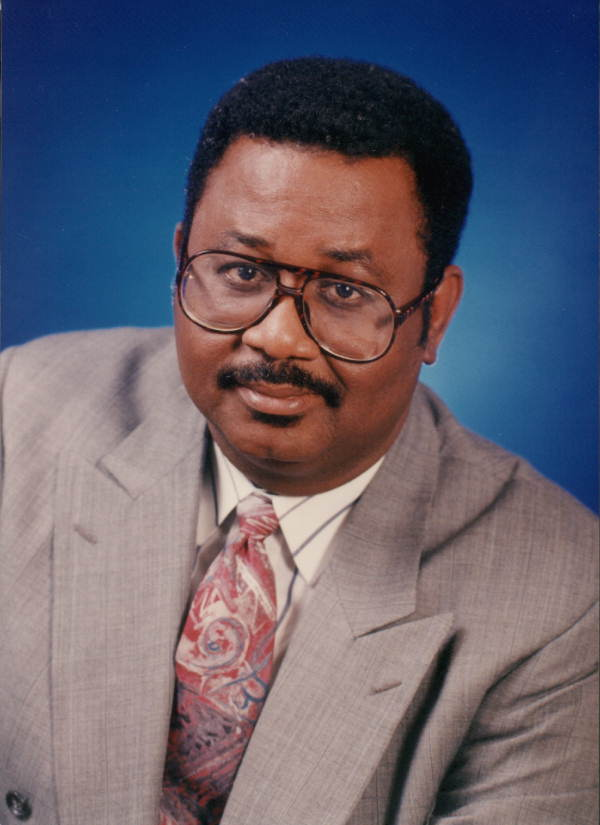
- Official portrait, 1994

Education Commissioner of Florida
- In office January 3, 1994 – January 3, 1995
- Governor: Lawton Chiles
- Preceded by: Betty Castor
- Succeeded by: Frank Brogan

Personal details
- Born: Douglas Lee Jamerson, Jr. October 16, 1947 St. Petersburg, Florida, U.S.
- Died: April 21, 2001 (aged 53) Tallahassee, Florida, U.S.
- Party: Democratic
- Spouse: Leatha
- Children: Cedric
- Education: St. Petersburg Junior College; University of South Florida

Douglas Lee "Tim" Jamerson, Jr. (October 16, 1947 – April 21, 2001) was a Florida Commissioner of Education. He was appointed to the position in 1993 after Betty Castor resigned to become President of the University of South Florida. He was defeated in his bid for a full term in 1994 by Frank Brogan.

Jamerson grew up in the poor neighborhoods in St. Petersburg, Florida. He planned to attend Gibbs High School, but his grandmother encouraged him to go to Bishop Barry High School (now St. Petersburg Catholic High School) instead, where he was the school's first black student. Jamerson graduated from St. Petersburg Junior College and received his bachelor's degree in criminal justice from the University of South Florida. He also was a graduate of St. Petersburg Police Academy.

Jamerson was elected to the Florida House of Representatives in 1982 from District 55 and served five and a half terms in that capacity. Governor Lawton Chiles appointed him state education commissioner in 1993, but he lost the seat to Frank Brogan in the 1994 election, in which Republicans made substantial gains. After his loss, Chiles appointed him as secretary of the state Department of Labor.

Jamerson died of cancer at the Tallahassee Memorial Hospital in 2001, at the age of 53.

Party political offices
Preceded by Betty Castor	Democratic nominee for Education Commissioner of Florida; 1994	Succeeded by Peter Rudy Wallace
Preceded by Betty Castor	Florida Commissioner of Education; 1993 – 1995	Succeeded by Frank Brogan
