= Ralph Turlington =

American politician (1920–2021)

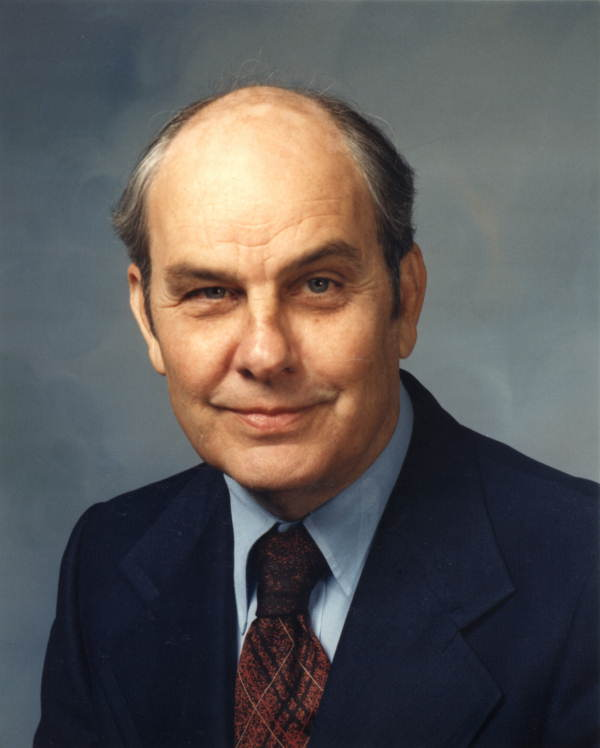

Education Commissioner of Florida
- In office 1974–1986
- Governor: Reubin Askew; Bob Graham
- Preceded by: Floyd T. Christian
- Succeeded by: Betty Castor

Speaker of the Florida House of Representatives
- In office 1967–1969
- Preceded by: E. C. Rowell
- Succeeded by: Frederick H. Schultz

Member of the Florida House of Representatives from the Alachua County district
- In office 1950–1974

Personal details
- Born: Ralph Donald Turlington; October 5, 1920 Gainesville, Florida, U.S.
- Died: May 12, 2021 (aged 100) Durham, North Carolina, U.S.
- Party: Democratic
- Spouse: Ann Gellerstedt (m. 1946; died 2003)
- Children: 2
- Education: University of Florida; Harvard University
- Occupation: insurance agent

Ralph Donald Turlington Sr. (October 5, 1920 – May 12, 2021) was an American politician from the state of Florida.

== Early life ==
Turlington was born in Gainesville, Florida in 1920. Turlington was in the inaugural class of the P. K. Yonge Developmental Research School, where he was a distinguished alumni, graduating in 1938. He attended the University of Florida, where he was also a distinguished alumni and member of Sigma Phi Epsilon Fraternity, to obtain a Bachelor of Science degree in business and Harvard University for his master's degree in the same field.

After completing his education, Turlington was commissioned as a 2nd Lieutenant in the United States Army with the Third Army the Battle of the Bulge during World War II. After the war, he worked at the University of Florida. In 1947, he became a faculty member of Alpha Kappa Psi Professional Business Fraternity. He received a Distinguished Alumni Award from the University of Florida in 1968.

== Florida House of Representatives ==
He was elected to the Florida House of Representatives in 1950 for Alachua County. He would serve until 1974, eventually also serving as speaker from 1967 to 1969. He was the Florida Commissioner of Education from 1974 to 1987. He was elected to Constitutional office in Florida more times than any other person in the history of Florida. Following his service as Commissioner of Education, Turlington joined the American College Testing Program (ACT) and served full-time as a consultant to longtime friend Dr. James W. Carr.

== Personal life ==
Turlington was married to Ann Gellerstedt (until her death in 2003) and had two children, Donald and Katherine. Turlington died on May 12, 2021, at the age of 100, in Durham, North Carolina.

== Legacy ==
A large building at the University of Florida, Ralph D. Turlington Hall, is named after him. It is located in the center of campus, houses multiple departments in the College of Liberal Arts and Sciences, and over a hundred classrooms. The Florida Department of Education headquarters in Tallahassee, the Turlington Building, is also named in his honor.

Party political offices
Preceded by Floyd T. Christian	Democratic nominee for Education Commissioner of Florida; 1974, 1978, 1982	Succeeded by Betty Castor
