= Francis Borkowski =

American academic (1936–2025)

3rd Chancellor of Appalachian State University
- In office 1993–2003
- Preceded by: John E. Thomas
- Succeeded by: Kenneth E. Peacock

4th President of the University of South Florida
- In office 1988–1993
- Preceded by: John Lott Brown
- Succeeded by: Betty Castor

Personal details
- Born: March 16, 1936 Wheeling, West Virginia, U.S.
- Died: January 19, 2025 (aged 88) Valle Crucis, North Carolina, U.S.
- Spouse: Kay Kaiser (m. 1959)
- Education: Oberlin College (B.S.); Indiana University Bloomington (M.A.), West Virginia University(Ph.D.)
- Occupation: Academic university administrator

Francis Thomas Borkowski (March 16, 1936 – January 19, 2025) was an American academic, chancellor, and university president. Before holding administrative positions, he was a musician and conductor.

== Early life ==
Borkowski was born in Wheeling, West Virginia, on March 16, 1936. Both his parents were the children of Polish immigrants. He and his family later moved to Steubenville, Ohio, where he attended Steubenville Catholic Central High School. He was among the first in his family to finish high school.

== Career ==
=== Music ===
Borkowski started playing the accordion at age nine, often performing at events in his community. In high school, he took classes in music and music theory. He attended Oberlin College from 1953 to 1957, earning a Bachelor of Science in Music Education. First, he planned on teaching music at the high-school level; however, mid-way through college he discovered his love of playing while studying with Reginald Kell. Then he began dedicating himself to the clarinet, with the hope of playing professionally. After Oberlin College he attended Indiana University Bloomington (IU) to complete a M.A. degree. In December 1957, he began playing for the Indianapolis Symphony Orchestra while still attending IU. In 1959 he resigned from the Orchestra and joined the Jacksonville Symphony Orchestra along with his wife. After spending two years in Jacksonville, in 1961, he decided to attend West Virginia University to pursue a Ph.D in music education with a minor in musicology. He became a member of the national music fraternity, Phi Mu Alpha Sinfonia in 1963. While pursuing his doctorate he taught the university's marching band, working with the concert band, and taught clarinet. He completed the doctorate in 1967.

== Administration experiences ==
=== Ohio University ===
In 1967, Borkowski became a faculty member at Ohio University in Athens, Ohio. He taught music classes and conducted research. The next year he was elected to the faculty senate and later was chosen to serve as the assistant director of the School of Music. In 1970 he joined the academic area staff, the position of Assistant Dean of Faculties. A few years later he was appointed the Associate Dean of Faculties.

=== Purdue University ===
After Borkowski's tenure with Ohio, he was appointed the first vice chancellor at Purdue University in West Lafayette, Indiana. He was also Dean of Faculties for some time.

=== South Carolina University ===
In 1978, he was appointed Provost at South Carolina University in Columbia, South Carolina. He was also Executive Vice-President for some time.

=== University of South Florida ===
Borkowski was nominated for president at University of South Florida (USF) by a librarian. Several things compelled him to apply for president: the appearance of the campus, many opportunities, the status of being a young university with little tradition, and the university's fine arts program. After he applied, he was interviewed by a chancellor and got the job. He became the seventh president of the University of South Florida in 1988. During his tenure he had many goals: make USF a top twenty-five public university in the country, improve the College of Public Health and University of South Florida College of Medicine. During his tenure, he also sought to bring what were ultimately criminal theft charges against the student Petr Taborsky who had invented a novel clay material that could absorb ammonia and other toxic substances. The path to take a criminal as opposed to a civil action against the student has been widely criticized

=== Appalachian State University ===
In 1993, Borkowski was appointed Appalachian State University's fifth chancellor. During his tenure he expanded the University's outreach program. Holmes Convocation Center, the university’s basketball and multi-purpose arena, was built during his time at Appalachian State. Though the university had improvements, there was controversy over some of the actions executed by Borkowski. Between 1995 and 1997, many rapes occurred on campus, and some blamed Borkowski for weak leadership and failure to punish perpetrators vigorously. Similar questions had been raised about his time at the University of South Florida, where a star basketball player avoided punishment despite reports that he had raped and/or sexually assaulted six women over the course of some months. The athlete did not receive any punishment and was still eligible to play in 1989 and 1990. In 2002, he designated an area on campus a "free-speech-zone," which was created in response to students protesting American foreign policy. Foundation for Individual Rights in Education (FIRE), a civil liberties group, questioned the constitutionality of the zone. In response to FIRE, ASU limited its "free-speech-zone" acts. He resigned as chancellor in June 2003.

== Personal life and death ==
Borkowski met his wife, Kay Kaiser, at Indiana University. They married in 1959. Borkowski died in Valle Crucis, North Carolina, on January 19, 2025, at the age of 88.

== See also ==
- List of Purdue University people
