= Deer Park, Florida =

Unincorporated community in Florida, U.S.

Coordinates: 28°05′28″N 80°53′53″W

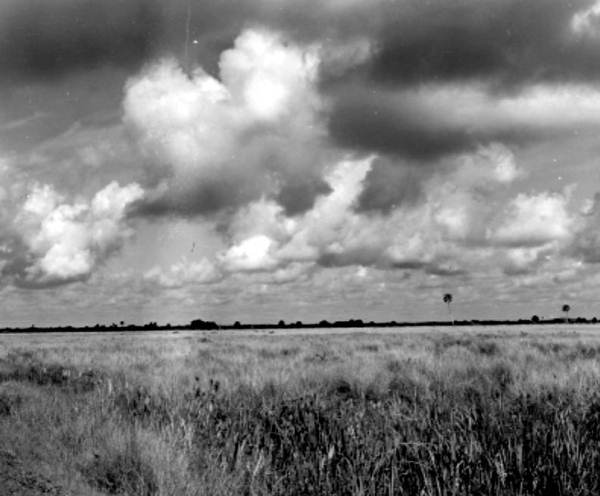
Part of the 200,000 acre property of Orlando Livestock Company Ranch, Deer Park, Florida, 1950

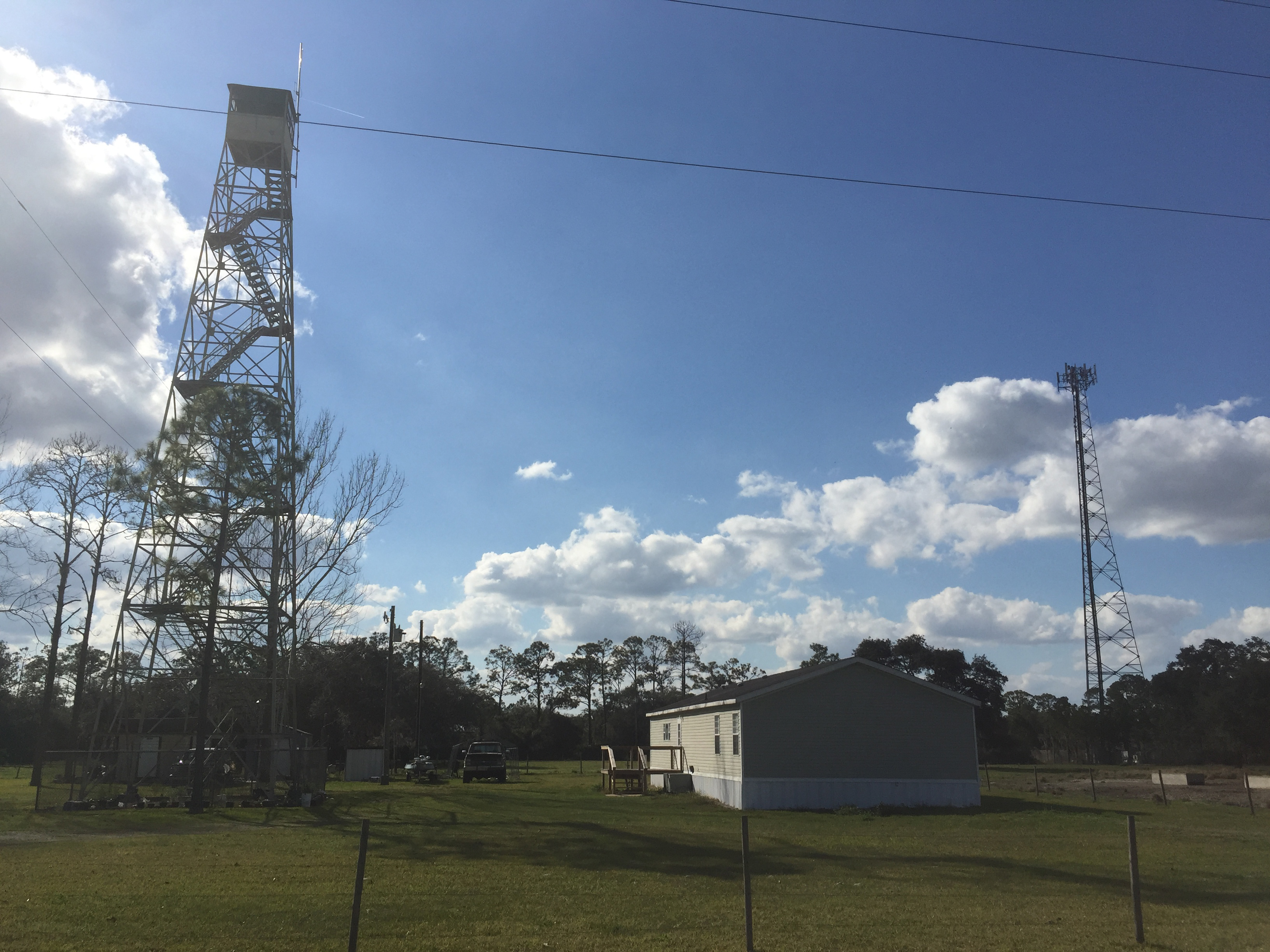
Deer Park Forestry Site.

Deer Park is an unincorporated community in Osceola County, Florida, United States. It is located off US 192, south of the intersection with County Road 419. The community is part of the Orlando–Kissimmee Metropolitan Statistical Area. It is the location of the Kempfer Cattle ranch, Deseret Ranches of the Church of Jesus Christ of Latter-day Saints, and the Deer Park Forestry Site of the Florida Department of Agriculture and Consumer Services.

== History ==
George W. Hopkins created settlements in Deer Park to house workers for his saw and planing mill at the Union Cypress Company he founded in Hopkins, Florida. In 1915, Hopkins with his son-in-law W. H. Kempfer founded the Kempfer Land and Cattle Co. The Kempfer family still operate the ranch on the south side of U.S. Route 192. The town itself decreased in size after the Union Cypress Company Railroad shut down in the early 1930s.

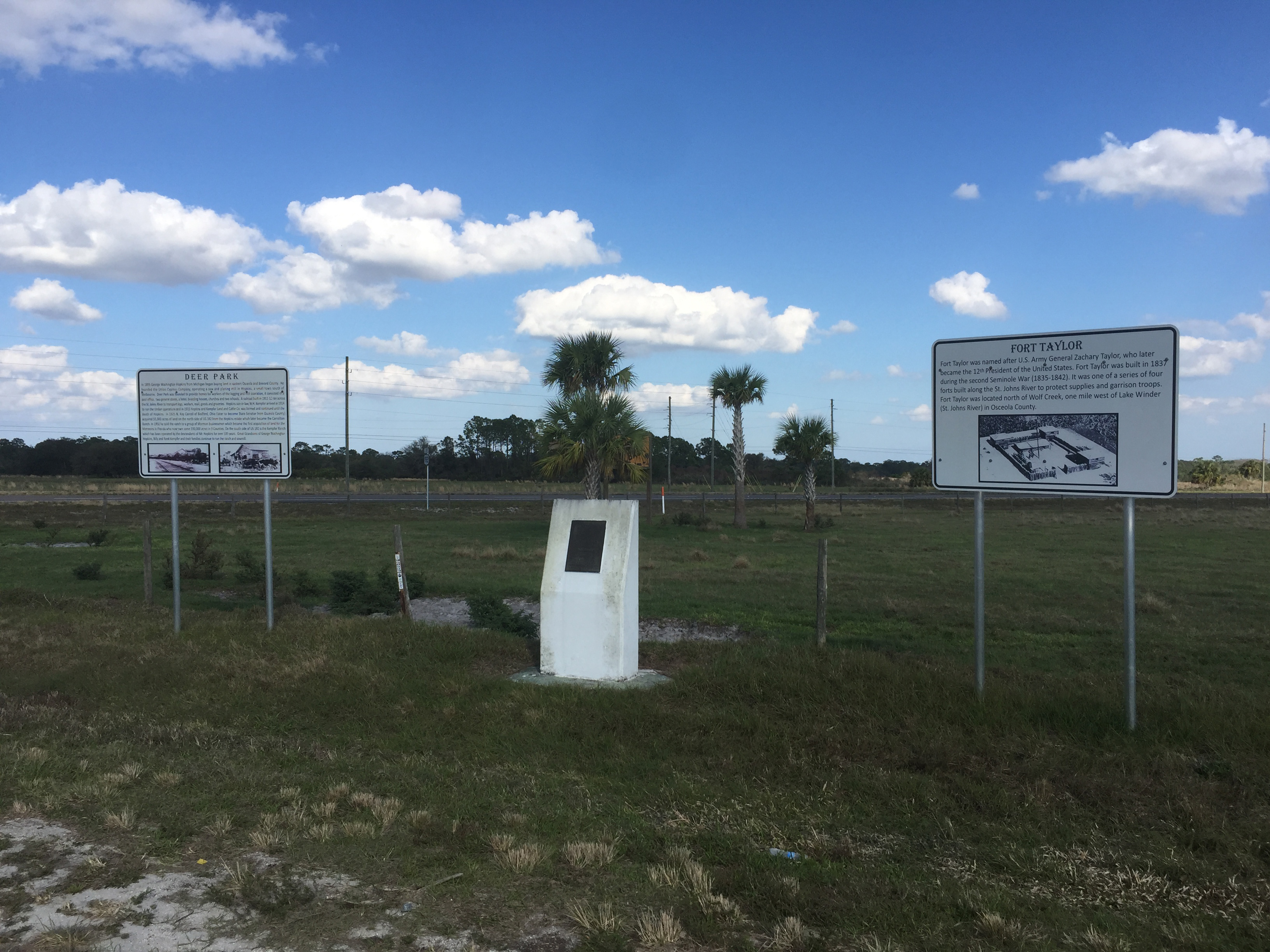
Fort Taylor in Deer Park. Now part of the Kempfer Cattle ranch.

== Fort Taylor ==
Fort Taylor, named after Army General and future President of the United States Zachary Taylor was located in Deer Park. This fort was built in 1837 during the Second Seminole Wars (not to be confused with Fort Zachary Taylor in Key West, Florida). It was one of four forts built during this time along the St. Johns River to facilitate military operations in the area. The army abandoned the fort in 1838, and R.B. and J.N. Savage established a trading post on the site.
