= David McClain (Florida politician) =

American politician (1933–2025)

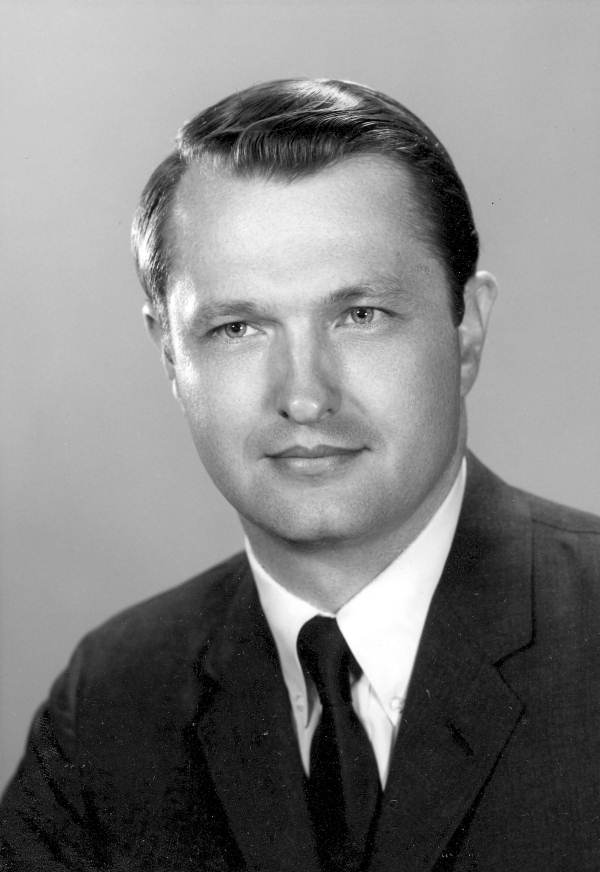

Member of the Florida Senate from the 21st district
- In office November 21, 1972 – November 16, 1982
- Preceded by: Henry B. Sayler
- Succeeded by: Betty Castor

Member of the Florida Senate from the 24th district
- In office May 1970 – November 21, 1972
- Preceded by: Joseph A. McClain, Jr.
- Succeeded by: Thomas "Tom" Gallen, Jr.

Personal details
- Born: David Hollingsworth McClain Macon, Georgia, U.S.
- Died: July 4, 2025 (aged 92) Tampa, Florida, U.S.
- Party: Republican
- Spouse: Carroll McClain
- Children: 2
- Education: Duke University (BA); George Washington University (MA); Stetson University (LLB)

Military service
- Branch/service: United States Army
- Years of service: 1953-1955
- Unit: 1st Infantry Division

David Hollingsworth McClain (born June 4, 1933 - July 4, 2025) was an American attorney and former politician in the state of Florida.

== Early life, education & military service ==
McClain was born in Macon, Georgia and moved to Florida in 1956. He is an alumnus Duke University (BA), George Washington University (MA), and Stetson College of Law (LLB). He served in the United States Army from 1953 to 1955 as a member of the 1st Infantry Division.

== Political career ==
From 1964 to 1970 he served on the Board of Public Relations and Convention Facilities and served as vice chairman from 1969 to 1970. He is a former member of the Florida Law Revision Council. From 1969 to 1970 he served as a legal advisor to the Hillsborough County Republican Executive Committee. He is a former member of the Hillsborough County Republican State Committee and former assistant treasurer of the Florida Republican Party.

He was elected to the Florida State Senate for the 24th district in 1971. He was redistricted to the 21st district in 1973, and served until 1982. He is a member of the Republican Party. From 1986 to 1987 he served as an assistant city attorney in Tampa.

He was a member of the Motor Vehicle Insurance Task Force in 1989. From 1989 to 1990 he served on the Tampa Hillsborough County Expressway Authority.

== Legal career ==
He practiced law in Florida. He was a senior partner with McClain, Smoak & Chistolini, LLC in Tampa until his retirement.

== Personal life ==
He and his wife Carroll have two children.
