= Thomas Gallen =

American politician (1932–2025)

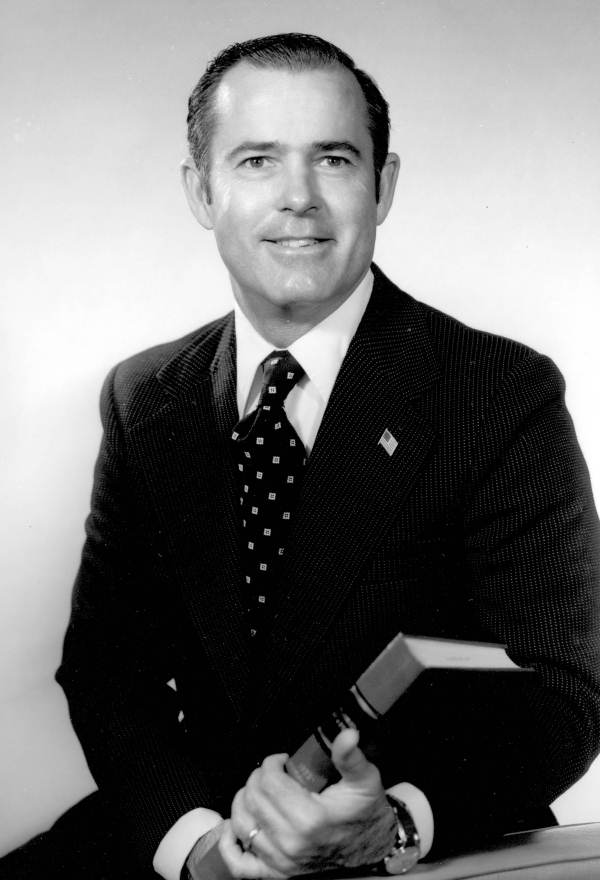

Florida House of Representatives
- In office 1965–1972

Florida Senate
- In office 1972–1978

Personal details
- Born: December 28, 1932 Tampa, Florida, U.S.
- Died: February 5, 2025 (aged 92) Bradenton, Florida, U.S.
- Party: Democratic
- Education: Florida State University, University of Florida
- Occupation: Judge

Military service
- Branch/service: Army
- Years of service: 1952–1955

Thomas Matthew Gallen Jr. (December 28, 1932 – February 5, 2025) was an American politician and jurist who served as a Florida state legislator and circuit judge.

== Background ==
Gallen was born in Tampa, Florida in 1932. He attended the University of Tampa, leaving during the Korean War in order to enlist in the Army Special Forces. He was a member of the inaugural group of Green Berets formed in 1952 and deployed to Bad Tölz, Germany in 1953, serving until 1955. After leaving the army he returned to school, receiving a BS in Business Administration from Florida State University and a Juris Doctor degree from the University of Florida. Gallen's father, Thomas Gallen, Sr., had been an attorney as well, practicing for only a few months before the Great Depression, then leaving law, but Gallen Jr. was never made aware of this fact until after his own graduation from law school.

Gallen died at his home in Bradenton, Florida, on February 5, 2025, at the age of 92.

== Legal career and public service ==
Gallen was a law partner at the law firm of Miller Gallen Kaklis and Venable from 1960 to 1985. During this period he also held public office, serving as a member of the Florida legislature for 12 years, first in the Florida House of Representatives, where he served from 1965 to 1972, before being elected to the Florida Senate. During his time in the Senate, he became chairman of the senate rules and calendar committee. He served in the Florida Senate from 1972 to 1978 before leaving office, opting to return to practicing law rather than seeking reelection. In 1985, he was elected to the 12th Judicial Circuit as a circuit judge, where he was elected as chief judge in 1998, and served until he retired in 2002. In 2005, Judge Gallen received the Manatee County Bar lifetime achievement award. He served as a senior circuit judge for the 12th Judicial Circuit and associate judge on the 2nd District Court of Appeals. In 2009, he issued a legal opinion that led to the release of James Bain following 35 years in prison, after DNA evidence was used to prove he was wrongfully convicted of rape. In 2013, Gallen was named to the Manatee County Rural Health Services board of directors.
