= Floyd T. Christian =

American politician

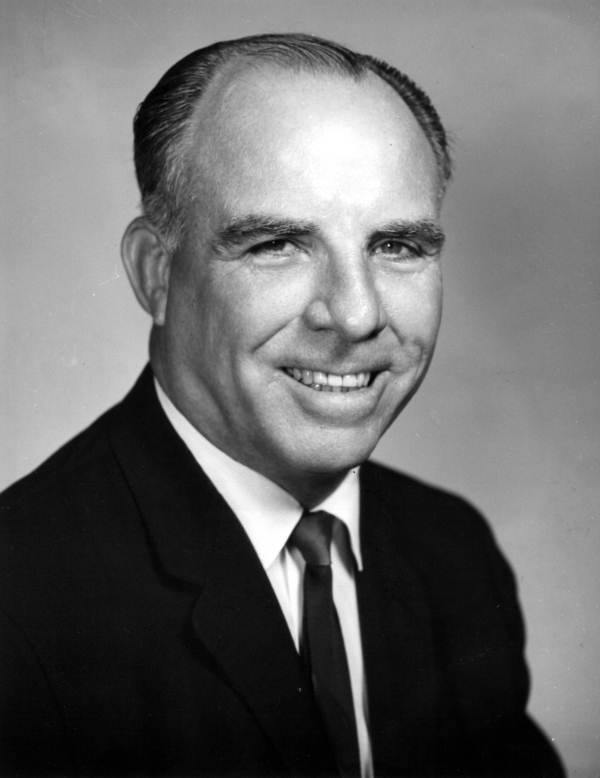

Florida Commissioner of Education
- In office 1965–1973

Personal details
- Born: December 18, 1914 Bessemer, Alabama, U.S.
- Died: May 11, 1998 (aged 83) St. Petersburg, Florida, U.S.
- Profession: Educator

Floyd Thomas Christian, Sr. (December 18, 1914 – May 11, 1998) was Florida Commissioner of Education from 1965 to 1973.

== Early life ==
Christian was born in Bessemer, Alabama. He moved to Pinellas County with his family in 1927.

== Education ==
Christian graduated from St. Petersburg High School in 1933. He received his Bachelor of Arts from the University of Florida in 1937. He received his master's degree in education from the University of Florida in 1950.

== Career ==
He was a teacher and coach at Clearwater High School and coach at Fort Myers High School from 1938 to 1941.

In World War II he served as battalion commander of the 697th Field Artillery and was discharged as a colonel in 1946. He received the Legion of Merit, the French Croix de Guerre, a Bronze Star Medal, a Silver Star, and the Italian Medal of Valor.

After the war, Christian was an administrator at the Florida Department of Veterans Affairs in St. Petersburg from 1946 to 1948. Christian was Superintendent of Public Instruction for Pinellas County from 1948 to 1965. Around this time Christian served as president of the Florida Association of County Superintendents (1954), president of the Florida Education Association (1955), and as the first chair of the Florida Educational Television Commission (1955). Christian also served on the Florida Board of Regents, and was one of its first appointees when the board was organized in 1965.

Christian was appointed state Superintendent of Public Instruction, by Governor W. Haydon Burns in 1965 and served until 1973. (The Superintendent of Public Instruction post was created by the 1868 Florida Constitution; under the 1885 Constitution, it became an elected position. The Superintendent headed the Department of Public Instruction (1869–1938) and its successor agency, the Florida Department of Education (1939–1968). Under the current Florida Constitution, adopted in 1968 during Christian's term, the title of the post was changed to Commissioner of Education and the post became one of the elected positions in the Florida Cabinet.)

Christian won election as Florida Commissioner of Education in 1970. The Florida statewide teachers' strike of 1968 and the desegregation of Florida schools occurred during Christian's tenure. While he "typified white officialdom's early resistance to desegregation" as Pinellas superintendent, Christian shifted positions and became a "staunch defender of desegregation" as state Commissioner of Education.

His career ended in 1975 after he was investigated for corruption and several months in federal prison for income tax evasion.

== Later life ==
Christian lived in Sarasota for about 20 years until he moved to a St. Petersburg retirement community in 1997. He suffered from congestive heart disease and died at Westminster Shores Health Care Center in 1998 at the age of 83.

Preceded by -	Florida Superintendent of Public Instruction; Florida Commissioner of Education; 1965–1973	Succeeded by -
