= William Watkin Hicks =

Methodist minister, politician and author (1837–1915?)

6th Florida Superintendent of Public Instruction
- In office March 1, 1875 – December 31, 1876
- Governor: Marcellus Stearns
- Preceded by: Jonathan C. Gibbs
- Succeeded by: W. P. Haisley

Personal details
- Born: 1837 England
- Died: 1915?
- Occupation: Methodist minister, newspaper editor, author and politician

William Watkin Hicks (1837–1915?) was a Methodist minister, newspaper editor, author, and politician. He served as Florida State Superintendent of Public Instruction from March 1, 1875, until December 31, 1876.

== Early career ==
Hicks was born in England in 1837, and came to the United States as a boy. From 1857 to 1861, he held various pastorates in the Baltimore (Maryland) Conference of the Methodist Episcopal Church in the vicinity of Darlington and Havre de Grace.

During the war, he became a missionary to India.

In 1865, he was appointed to a Methodist pastorate in Frederick City, Maryland; but, changing both denomination and location, in December 1867 he became the acting pastor of a Congregational Church in Brooklyn. In late 1868, he moved again, to Charleston, South Carolina, and on January 8, 1869, he became assistant pastor to the aged John Bachman (d. 1874) of St. John's Lutheran Church in that city. "His brilliant sermons drew great crowds," and yet he resigned on August 23, 1870. Meanwhile, alongside Felix Gregory De Fontaine, he edited a monthly magazine titled The XIX Century (1869–1871).

In 1871, he returned to Methodism as pastor of the First Street Methodist Episcopal Church, South, in Macon, Georgia. He continued to hold pastorates in Georgia and Florida until 1875. By 1875, he was associated with Dade County, Florida.

== Political career ==
In 1875, Governor Stearns appointed Hicks to the post of Superintendent of Public Instruction in order to fill a vacancy left by the death of J. C. Gibbs; between Gibbs' death in August 1874 and Hicks' appointment in March 1875, Florida Secretary of State Samuel B. McLin served as acting Superintendent.

Overlapping his term as Superintendent of Public Instruction, in 1875–1876, Hicks served as the final editor of the Republican Fernandina Observer. He was also active in campaigning for the Republican candidate in the election of 1876. He traveled the state with William U. Saunders, a colored man from Baltimore, urging their mostly black audiences to "vote early and often."

The election of 1876 saw Rutherford B. Hayes elected to the Presidency, and Hicks replaced as Superintendent by William Penn Haisley.

Soon after the 1881 inauguration of James A. Garfield, Hicks moved to Washington, D. C., seeking preferment for some political office, but he was unsuccessful. He became the pastor of a breakaway Methodist congregation "over by the Smithsonian grounds" known as the Washington Tabernacle, to which he preached in a sensational style. Hicks attended Garfield's assassin Charles Guiteau in prison from June 10, 1882, and officiated at his hanging on June 30. His unconventional sermons and his apparent sympathy for the assassin — on top of his previous peregrinations and carpetbagging — led the Atlanta Constitution to brand him "a bird of passage in theology as well as in habitation."

== Later career ==
By 1884, Hicks called Orange County, Florida, home. Hicks contributed somewhat to the Florida citrus industry via his introduction of certain orange varieties.

In 1892, he wrote (under the pseudonym "Golden Light") a Spiritualist roman à clef titled Angels' Visits to My Farm in Florida. This was reprinted in 1913 under the auspices of the Sanctuary Publishing Company. The same company had already printed Hicks' The Sanctuary (1910), a synthesis of the teachings of Nagasena with Christianity; The Jungle-Wallah (1911); and The Banner With the New Device (1913), which engaged with feminist and suffragist topics as well as the theological. His A Valentine for the Lonely (1912) was printed by the Occult and Modern Thought Book Centre in Boston.
