= Rafael E. Martinez =

Cuban-American lawyer

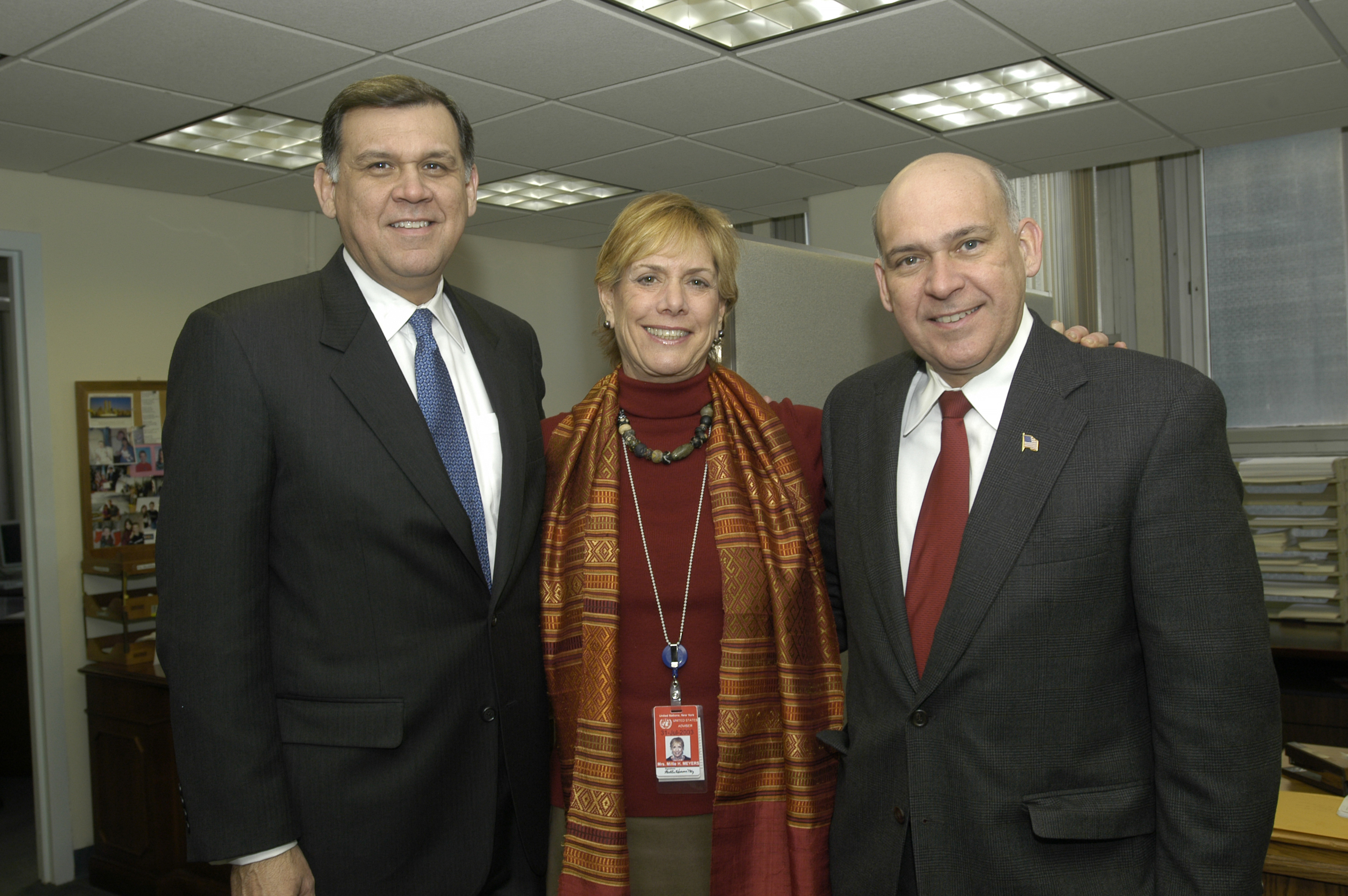
Mel Martinez, Millie H. Meyers, and Rafael Martinez at United Nations Headquarters in 2002

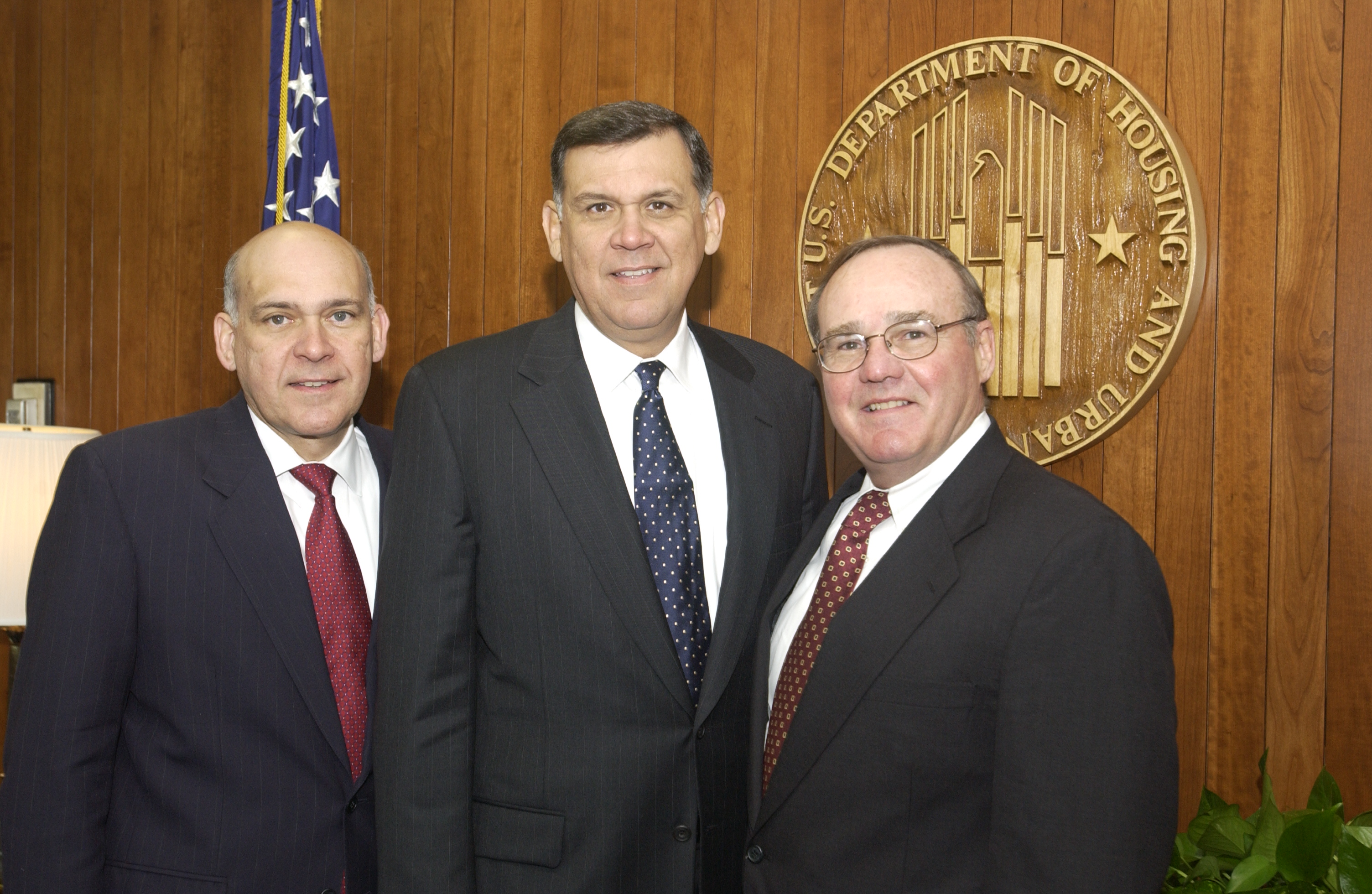
Rafael and Mel Martinez with attorney John "Jack" McEwan II in 2003

Rafael E. Martinez (born April 26, 1950), is a Cuban-American lawyer. He is the brother of former Florida Senator Mel Martinez. Martinez was nominated in 2003 by President George W Bush to serve as a public delegate, representing the United States before the 57th United Nations General Assembly. He was confirmed by the United States Senate and served as a public delegate for that term. Martinez was the 2003 United States' candidate to serve on the Inter-American Commission on Human Rights, the human rights arm of the Organization of American States. Since his candidacy was unsuccessful, as of January 2004 there was no U.S. national on the seven-member Commission for the first time since its inception in 1959.

In early 2019, Florida Governor Ron DeSantis appointed Martinez to the Greater Orlando Aviation Authority board.

Rafael is married to Becky Martinez with whom he has three children, Rebecca, Will, and Maggie.
