= Citrus County Chronicle =

Florida-based newspaper

- Front page of the September 9, 2021, issue
- Type: Newspaper
- Owner: Paxton Media Group
- Founder: Albert M. Williamson
- Founded: 1889
- Headquarters: 1624 N. Meadowcrest Blvd. Crystal River, FL 34429
- OCLC number: 15802799
- Website: chronicleonline.com

Citrus County Chronicle is a newspaper serving Citrus County, Florida and the surrounding areas. It was based in the county seat of Inverness, and has since moved its headquarters to Crystal River.

== History ==
The paper was begun in 1889 by Albert M. Williamson as a business encyclical. Walter Warnock, county clerk, took over the publication in the 1890s and added news reporting. The paper has changed hands numerous times throughout the enduing years:

- 1914 - George Butler becomes editor and owner, transferred later that year to Albert Butler
- 1929 - Joseph Wilson of Clearwater, Florida buys the paper, and becomes an agrarian populist editor
- 1935 - acquired by the Scofield Publishing Company
- 1946 - purchased by a succession of Bradenton owners: N.A. Perry and J.R. Hough
- 1947 - bought by Col. George Johnson
- 1948 - sold to the Chicago Sun-Times editor Paul Ramsey
- 1959 - sold to the Bennett Hahn Company, and quickly thereafter to Frances and Carl Turner of Wisconsin
- 1962 - sold to a St. Petersburg group led by Herman Goldner

1963 - sold to David S. Arthurs

- 1980 - merged with Landmark Community Newspapers

1986 - expanded to a daily newspaper

- 2021 - sold to Paxton Media Group, its current owner
