= Florida Educator Accomplished Practices =

The Florida Educator Accomplished Practices, or FEAPs, are core standards provided by the Florida Department of Education for teacher development, detailing the knowledge and skills teachers are expected to have. They provide the framework for Florida's teaching prep programs, certification requirements, and teacher assessment systems.

The Accomplished Practices were established in 1998 via State Board of Education Rule 6A-5.065, F.A.C., as part of a statewide push for education reforms calling for ways to assess teacher competency and decide whether programs should be approved. The FEAPs were later revised in 2011, 2022, and 2023.

The FEAPs define six practices: instructional design and lesson planning; the learning environment; instructional delivery and facilitation; assessment; continuous professional improvement; and professional responsibility and ethical conduct. FEAPs are divided into three sections: Paraprofessional, Professional and Accomplished. At all three divisions, the person performs certain activities that may take one or more of the following FEAPs: assessment, communication, continuous improvement, critical thinking, diversity, ethics, human development & learning, knowledge of subject matter, learning environments, planning, role of the teacher, and technology.
