= Hopkins, Florida =

Former town in Florida

Coordinates: 28.0682°N 80.5997°W

Hopkins, also known as South Melbourne, is a former town in Brevard County, Florida, United States. It is part of the present-day city of Melbourne.

== Town of Hopkins, Florida ==
The former town of Hopkins was developed by George W. Hopkins after he formed the Union Cypress Company on the south side of Crane Creek in present-day Melbourne, Florida. This is where Hopkins constructed cypress and pine sawmills in the years between 1910 and 1915. Hopkins also purchased nearly 100,000 acres (400 km^{2}) in southwestern Brevard County and Osceola County. Hopkins constructed the Union Cypress Railroad to transport timber from Deer Park in Osceola County to his mills south of Melbourne.

The Hopkins operation became the company town of Hopkins, employing up to 500 men at its peak, complete with a company store, hospital, post office and FEC railroad depot.

== Hopkins Lumber Products ==
Hopkins became the most successful businessman in Brevard County in the early 1900s. He worked with his son-in-law, William H. Kempfer, to promote the settlement of Deer Park. His products were shipped throughout the state on the Florida East Coast Railroad. Many of the original bridges, including the first to span the Indian River at Cocoa, were built with Union Cypress products. The Hopkins cypress mill burned to the ground in 1920, but was rebuilt. The mill continued to operate after George Hopkins died in 1925, supplying lumber and building products for the building boom of the twenties. The Hopkins sawmills finally closed after the Deer Park site had been stripped of its most valuable timber. The Kempfer Sawmill continues to operate near Deer Park, providing cypress and mulch for Brevard and Osceola Counties.

== See also ==
- List of ghost towns in Florida
