= Eleazer Kingsbury Foster =

American politician (1813–1877)

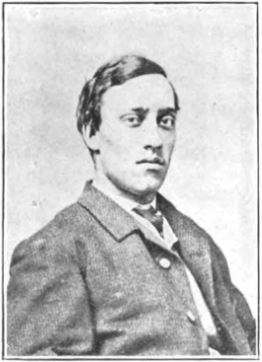
Eleazer Kingsbury Foster

Eleazer Kingsbury Foster (May 20, 1813 – June 13, 1877) was a lawyer and politician in the United States.

Foster was born in New Haven, Connecticut. His father Eleazer Foster was a prominent lawyer of New Haven until his early death in 1819. His mother, Mary Pierpont, was a great-grandchild of Rev. James Pierpont, one of the principal founders of Yale College.

Foster graduated from Yale in 1834. He studied law in the Yale Law School, was admitted to the bar in March, 1837, and settled in practice in his native city. He represented New Haven in the Connecticut General Assembly in 1844 and 1845, and again in 1865 when he served as Speaker of the Connecticut House of Representatives. In 1845, 1846, 1848, and 1849, he was Judge of Probate for the district of New Haven. In 1854 he was appointed State's Attorney for New Haven County, and was nominated Register in Bankruptcy when that office was created, and continued in both these positions till his death. Besides his professional success, Foster's social qualities gained him the warm regard of a large circle of friends. He died, in New Haven, after a brief illness, of pneumonia, June 13, 1877, aged 64 years.

He married Mary, daughter of William C. Codrington, a lady of English birth, and formerly of Kingston, Jamaica, but then of New Haven, Jan 2, 1838. She died Sept 25, 1872. Of their children, two daughters died before their parents, and three sons, all graduates of Yale, survived him.

This article incorporates public domain material from the Yale Obituary Record.
