= Turlington Building =

Building in Florida

Ralph D. Turlington Florida Education Center
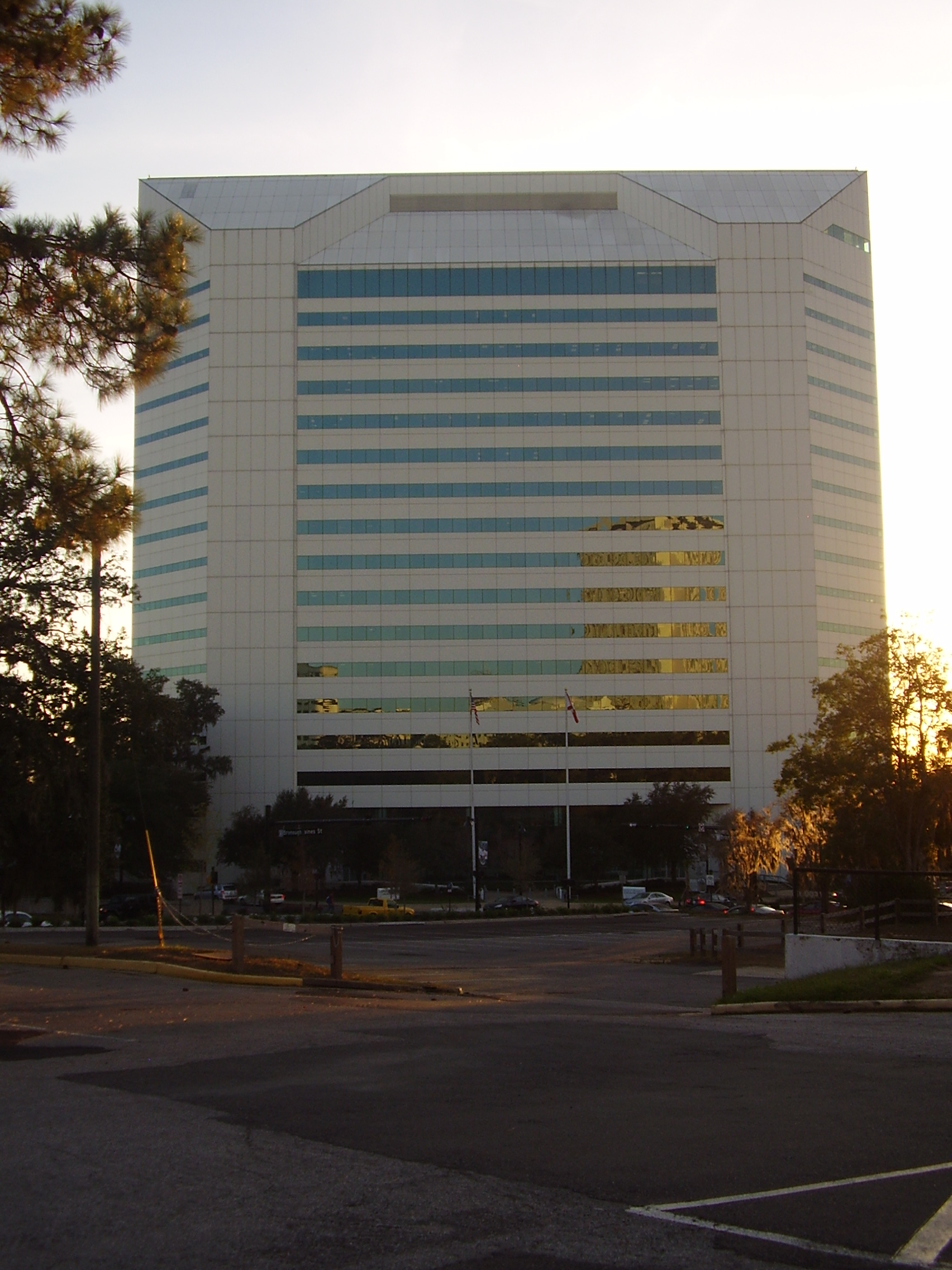
- Turlington Building as viewed from front entrance
- Interactive map of the Ralph D. Turlington Florida Education Center area
- Alternative names: Florida Department of Education

General information
- Location: 325 W Gaines St, Tallahassee, Florida
- Coordinates: 30.435°N 84.2849°W
- Construction started: 1986
- Completed: 1989

Height
- Height: 222.5 ft (67.8 m)

Technical details
- Floor count: 18

Website
- www.fldoe.org

The Ralph D. Turlington Florida Education Center, commonly known as the Turlington Building and colloquially known as The Razor, is an 18-story building in downtown Tallahassee, Florida. It is the second tallest building in Tallahassee after the Florida State Capitol. The building was completed in 1989. It houses the Florida Department of Education and was named after former Education Commissioner Ralph Turlington.
