= Helen Blazes =

Helen Blazes may refer to:

- Lake Helen Blazes, on the St. Johns River in Florida
- Helen Blazes archaeological site, near the above lake
