= Henegar =

Henegar, Henagar, or Henager may refer to:

- Henagar, Alabama - a city in DeKalb County, Alabama, United States
- Stevens–Henager College - a private non-profit college in Ogden, Utah
- Henegar House - a historic house in Charleston, Tennessee
- Henegar Center - a historic U.S. building in Melbourne, Florida
