= Erna Nixon Park =

Park in Florida, United States

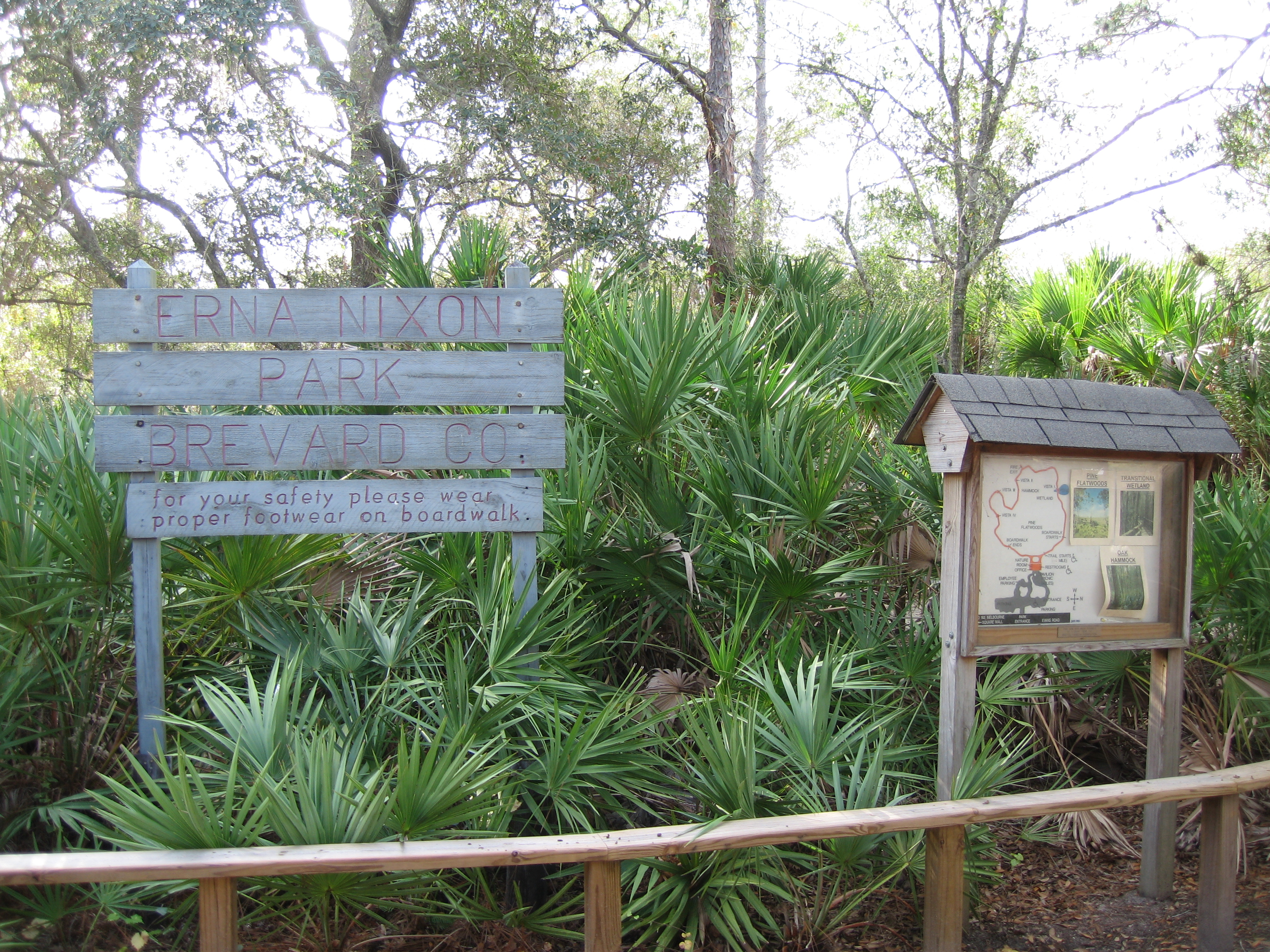
- Sign inside Erna Nixon Park
- Interactive map of Erna Nixon Park
- Type: Public park
- Location: 1200 Evans Road; Melbourne, Florida
- Coordinates: 28°05′24.73″N 80°39′25.90″W
- Area: 53.93 acres or 21.82 ha
- Operator: Brevard County
- Open: All year

Erna Nixon Park is a public park located on 1200 Evans Road, Melbourne, Florida. It contains a 3,000-foot (910 m) elevated boardwalk through a natural Florida hammock. The park contains ferns and old live oaks with hanging Spanish moss. It provides a natural habitat for several species of birds and small animals, such as the gopher tortoise and indigo snake. The park also hosts frequent events, such as the semi-annual Moonlight Stroll that takes place in the evening and includes live music. The park is named after Melbourne Village naturalist Erna Nixon (B: November 3, 1891). The park features three designated vistas and has a gazebo close to the start of the trail.

The Erna Nixon Park Nature Center features exhibits of animal mounts and live small animals. The park also has a butterfly garden with plants native to Florida.

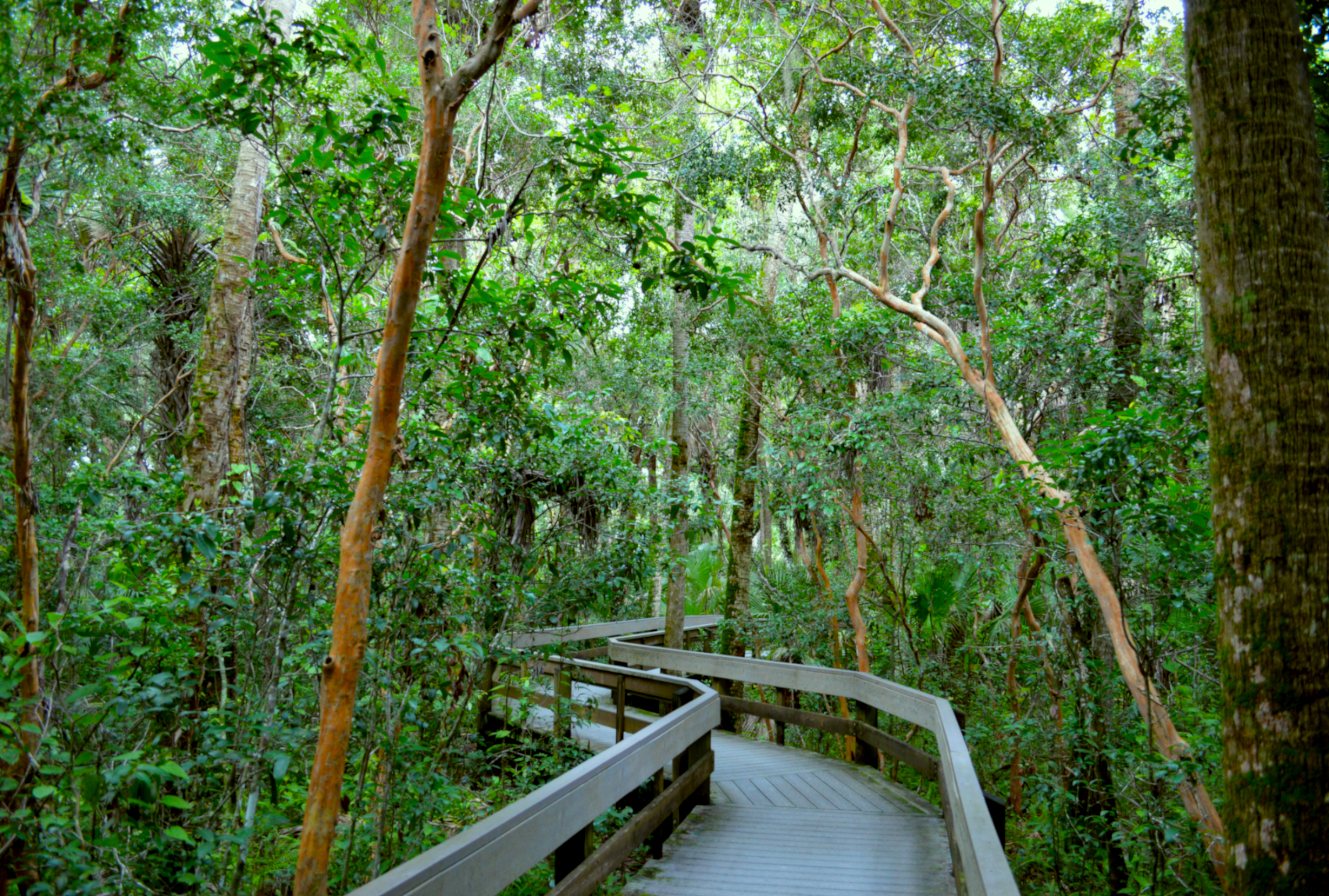
A section of a boardwalk trail from Erna Nixon Park, in between Vista II and Vista III.

== Gallery ==
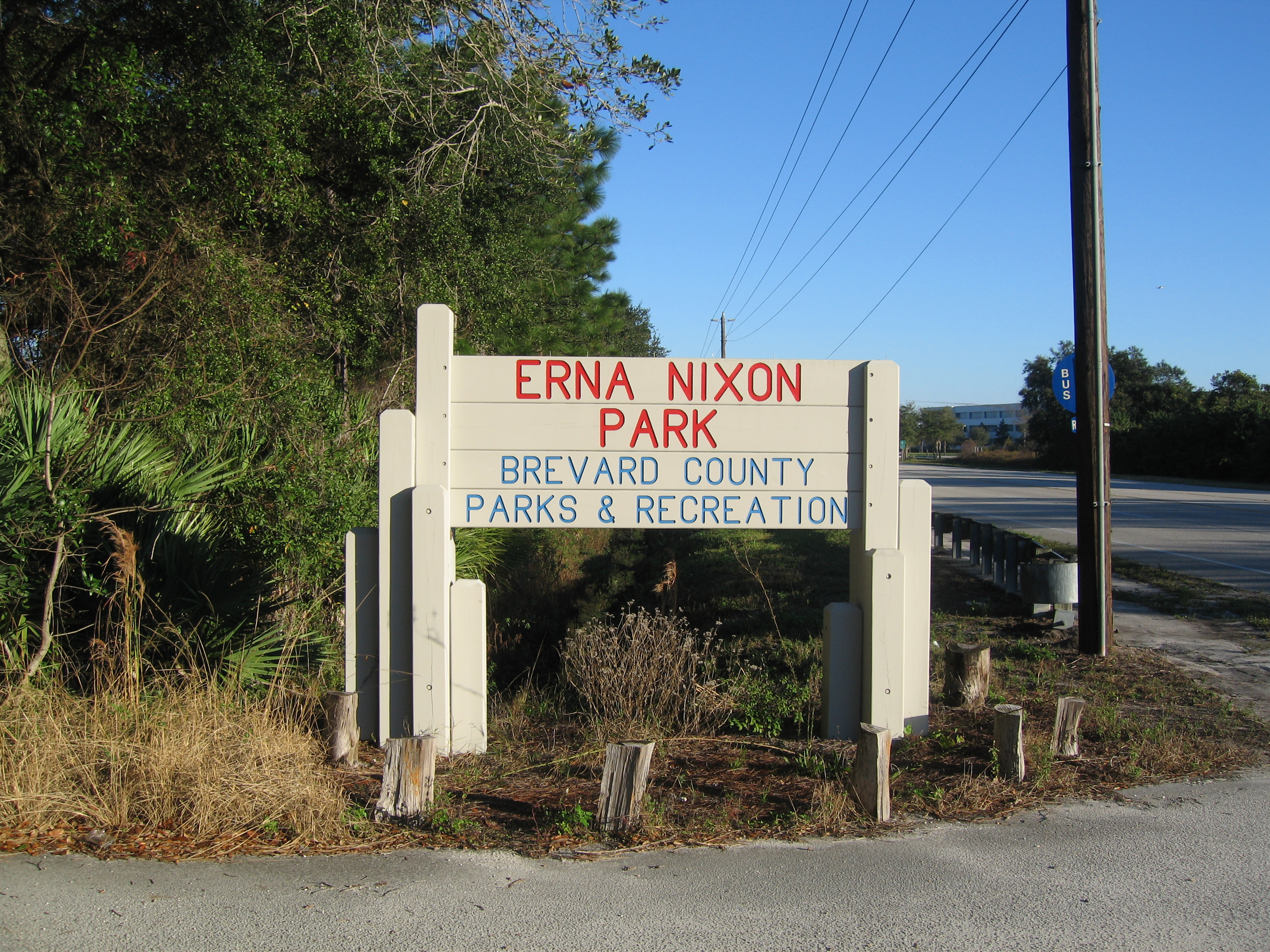
Sign at entrance to park

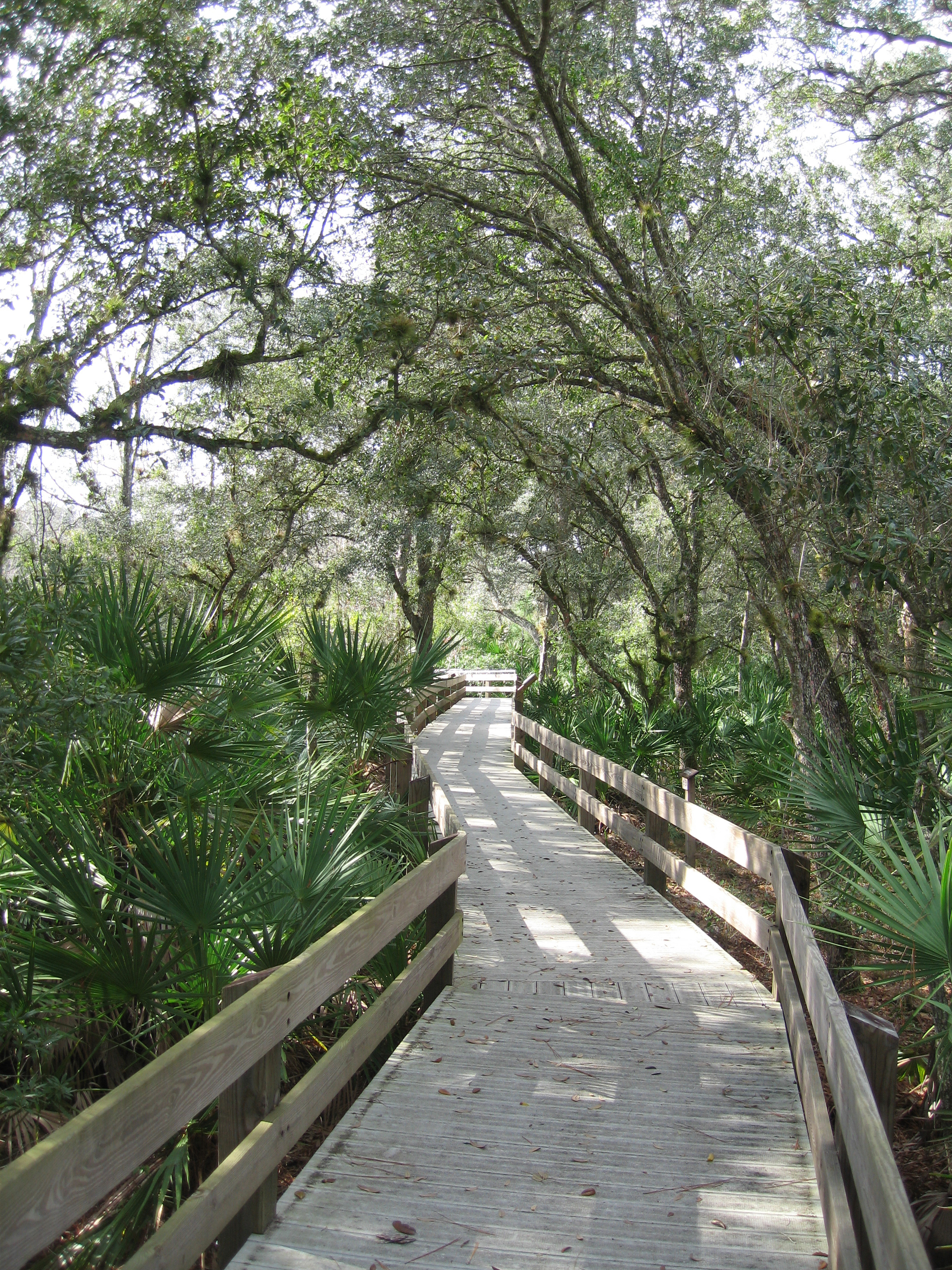
Boardwalk at Erna Nixon Park

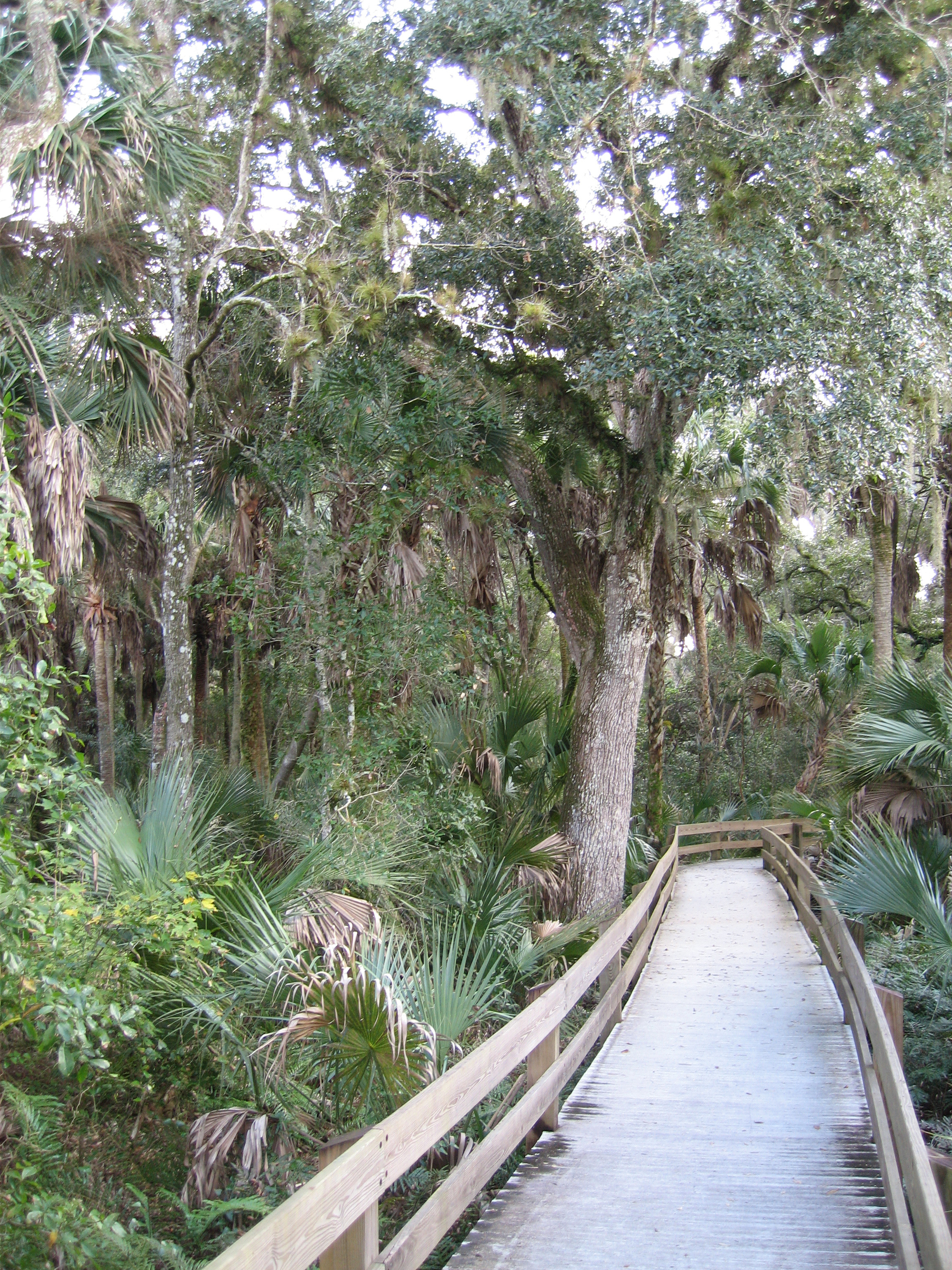
Boardwalk at Erna Nixon Park

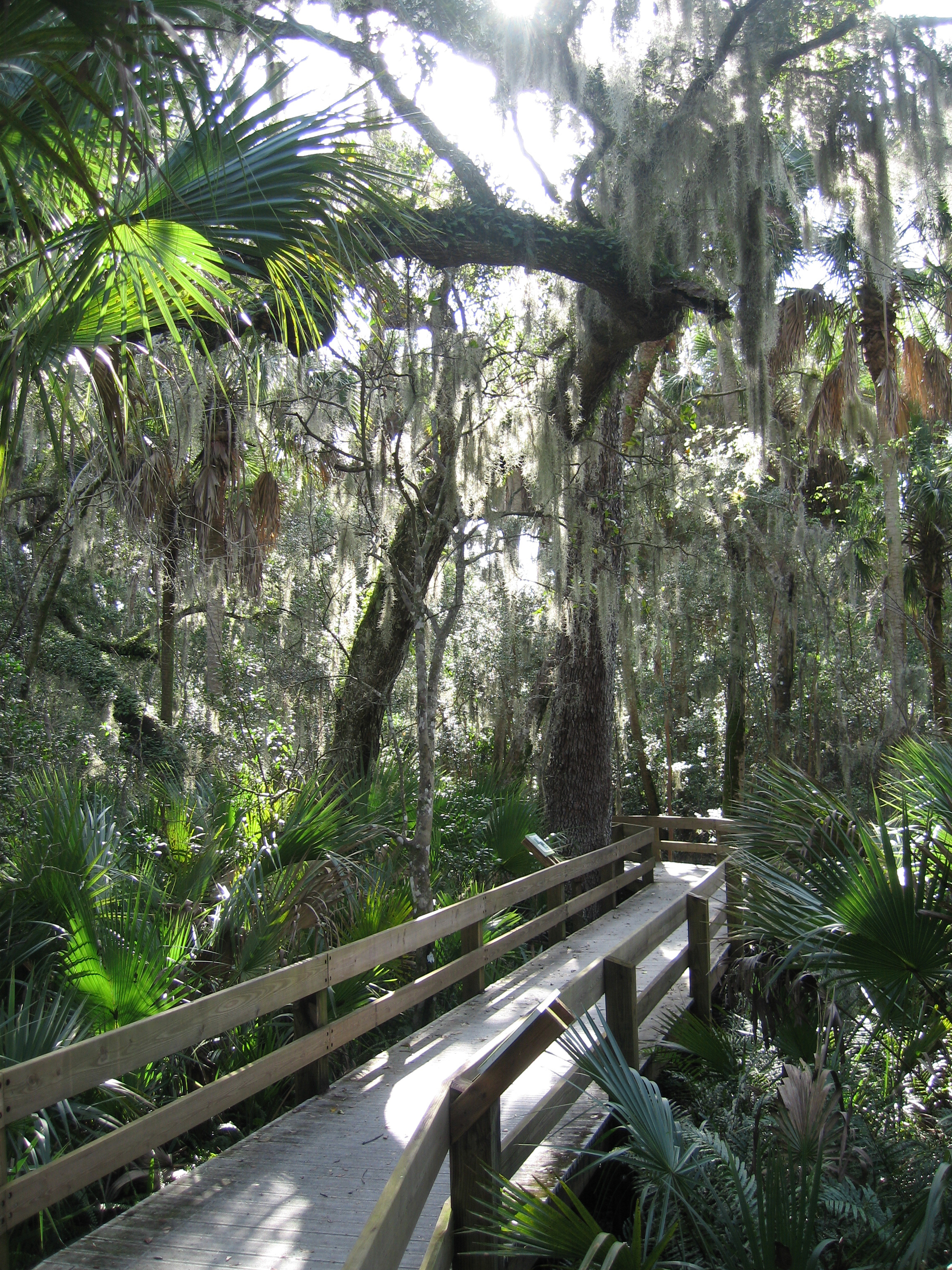
Boardwalk at Erna Nixon Park
