= William H. Gleason House =

- U.S. National Register of Historic Places
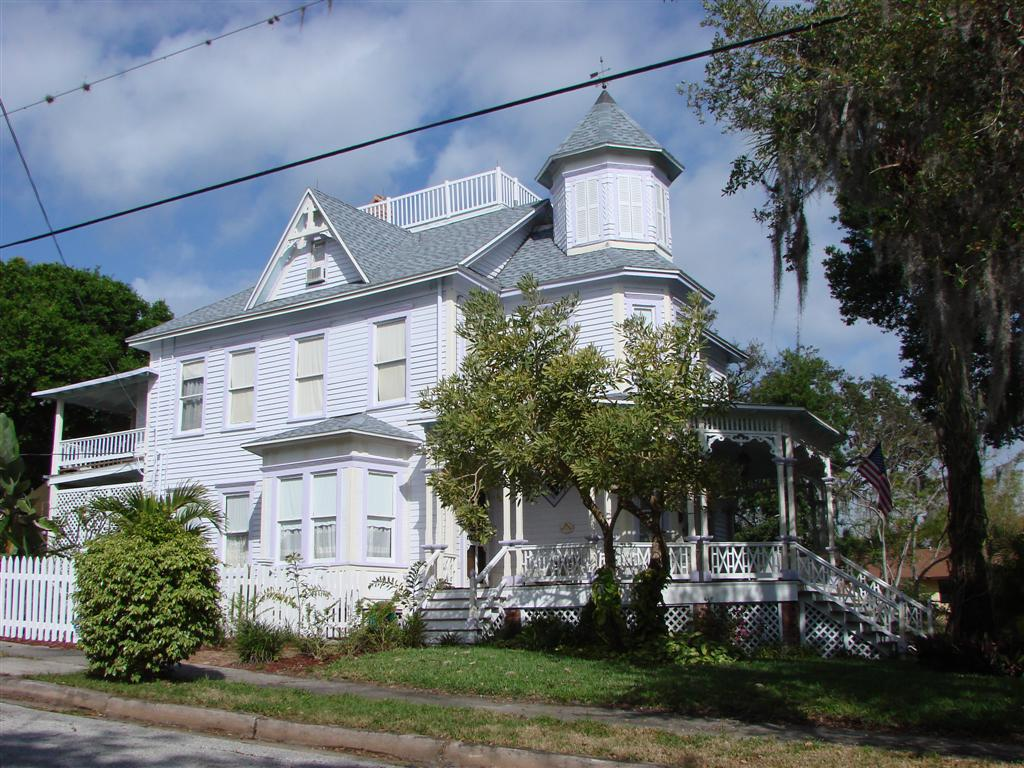

- Location within Florida Location within the United States
- Location: Melbourne, Florida
- Coordinates: 28°8′6″N 80°37′45″W
- Architectural style: Queen Anne
- NRHP reference No.: 96001608
- Added to NRHP: January 25, 1997

The William H. Gleason House is a historic home in Melbourne, Florida, United States. The house was built around 1884 by William Henry Gleason (c. 1829–1902) and his wife Sarah Griffin Gleason and is at 1736 Pineapple Avenue in the Eau Gallie neighborhood founded by the Gleasons before incorporating with Melbourne in 1969. Gleason House is an outstanding example of Queen Anne style architecture. On January 25, 1997, it was added to the U.S. National Register of Historic Places.

== See also ==
- William Henry Gleason
- William Henry Hunt Gleason

== References and external links ==
- Brevard County listings at National Register of Historic Places
- Old Pineapple Inn - Website of the Old Pineapple Inn, a bed and breakfast inn operated at the Gleason House.
