= Lake Hell 'n Blazes =

Lake in the state of Florida, United States

- Location within Florida Location within the United States
- Location: Brevard County, Florida
- Coordinates: 28°01′16″N 80°47′37″W
- Basin countries: United States
- Surface area: 381 acres (154 ha)

Lake Hell 'n Blazes, Hellen Blazes or Helen Blazes, is the source of the St. Johns River, located in Brevard County, Florida, United States, about 10 miles (16 km) southwest of Melbourne. The lake is 260 acres (110 ha) in area, and is at the head of the St. Johns River.

The name "Hell 'n Blazes" has been attributed to the words used by early 20th century fishermen while trying to navigate through floating islands, and to the formerly remote location of the lake. The variants "Hellen Blazes" and "Helen Blazes" have been used as euphemisms.

The lake originally was in a marshy floodplain that was 10 to 20 miles (16 to 32 km) wide. As agriculture expanded into the floodplain, canals were dug draining into the lake, and the marshes were reduced to just 3 miles (4.8 km) wide near the lake. Heavy rainfall sends large quantities of polluted water into the lake. The lake had been reputed to be one of the best bass-fishing lakes in Florida, but was in decline by the 1970s. Bass stopped spawning in the lake, and rarely entered it. In 1992, the lake was clogged with hydrilla and water hyacinth. By 1994, drainage had left the lake with only a foot or two of water, grounding the floating islands it was known for.

A 1992 report to the Florida Fish and Wildlife Conservation Commission concluded that dredging accumulated sediment from the lake bottom would restore the bass fishery in the lake. As of 2006, no funding had been approved for a dredging project.

The nearby Helen Blazes archaeological site is named for the lake.

== Sources ==
- Thomas, Mike (January 9, 1994). "The Lady Of The Lake Is Not So Ladylike". tribunedigital-orlandosentinel.
- Wright, Leroy (2006). Saving the St. Johns River: One Person Made a Difference. Dog Ear Publishing. ISBN 9781598582390.
- U.S. Geological Survey Geographic Names Information System: Lake Hellen Blazes
