= Melbourne Cemetery =

Historic cemetery in Brevard County, Florida

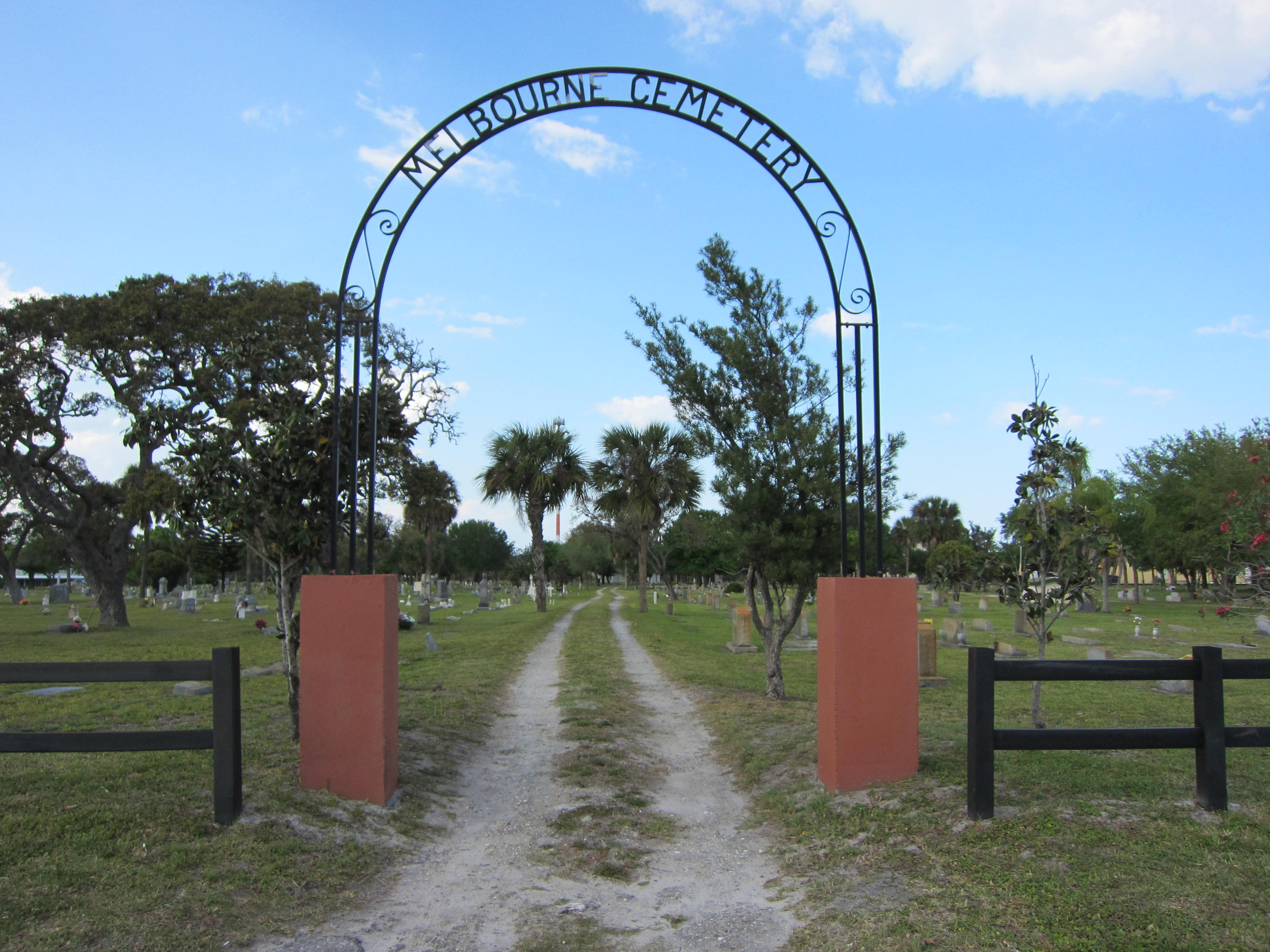
- Entrance to Melbourne Cemetery
- Interactive map of Melbourne Cemetery

Details
- Location: Melbourne, Florida
- Country: United States
- Coordinates: 28°05′10.42″N 80°36′34.90″W
- Owned by: City of Melbourne

The Melbourne Cemetery or City of Melbourne Cemetery is a cemetery in Melbourne, Florida, United States. It is located on Hibiscus Boulevard at the intersection with Lake Street. The cemetery includes graves of original settlers of Melbourne, to include Cornthwaite John Hector who founded the city. Although formally organized as a cemetery in 1891, native Americans purportedly used the site as a burial grounds for many years before.

== Graves ==
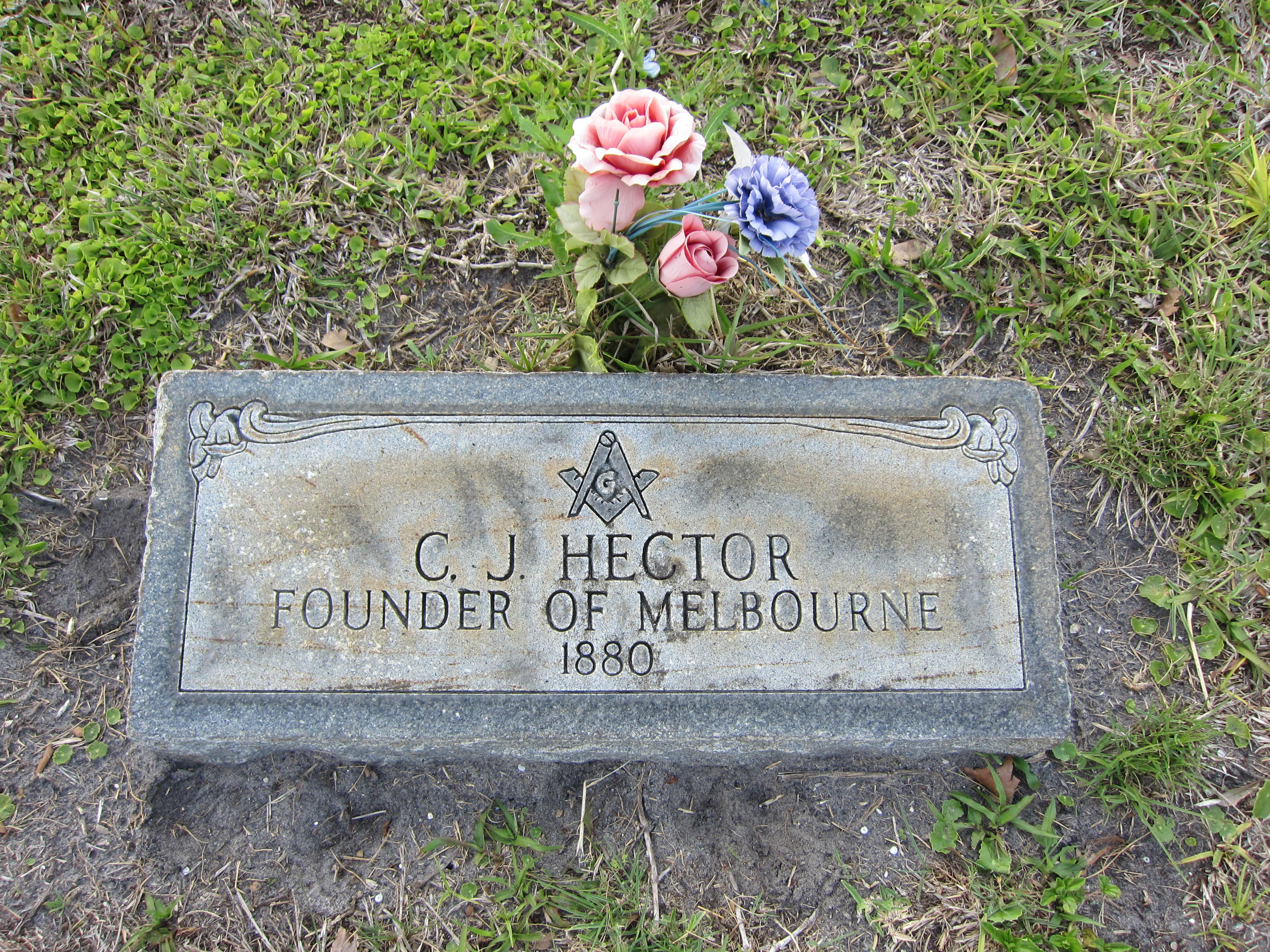
Grave marker of C. J. Hector

Some of the graves include:

- Beaujean family
- Ellis family
- Fee family
- Goode family
- Porcher family
- Rhodes family
- Rowland family
