= Cornthwaite John Hector =

American pioneer (1835–1898)

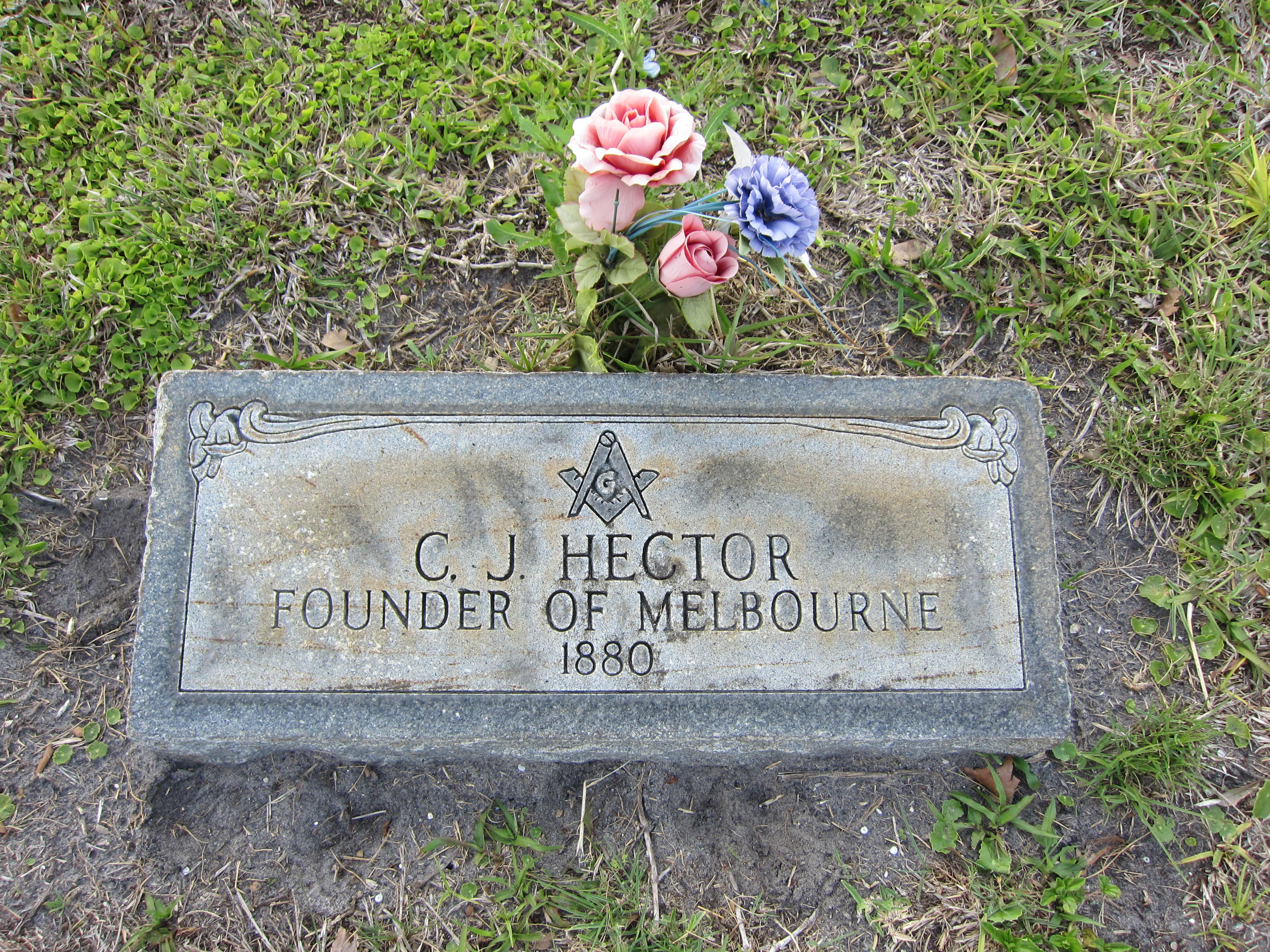
- Born: 6 May 1835; Van Diemens Land (now Tasmania, Australia)
- Died: 6 January 1898 (aged 62); Crescent City, Florida, USA
- Resting place: Melbourne Cemetery, Melbourne, Florida, USA
- Occupations: grocer, postmaster
- Spouse: Ida Gard (m. 10 October 1895)
- Children: George Nelson Hector
- Relatives: Cornthwaite Hector (grandfather)

Cornthwaite John Hector (6 May 1835 – 6 January 1898) was the founder of Melbourne, Florida, and its first postmaster.

== Early life and family ==
Cornthwaite John Hector was born 6 May 1835, in Van Diemen's Land (now Tasmania), though his application to start a post office lists his birthplace as Liverpool, England. He was the son of Cornthwaite Hector and Elizabeth Budd. Cornthwaite and Elizabeth had emigrated from Portsmouth to the British penal colony of Van Diemen's Land, the southernmost of the Australian colonies, where they had been given a grant of land by the British government. They had arrived at Hobart on the ship Lang on Tuesday 23 December 1828. By 1840 the family had moved to Kororāreka, New Zealand.

At ten years of age, Hector was present at the Battle of Kororāreka. He became notable for his "gallant conduct" at that battle for "bringing up ammunition from the stockade during the heaviest fire", according to a newspaper report of the time.

Hector, along with his brother, George Nelson Hector, worked for Bishop George Augustus Selwyn, (the first Bishop of New Zealand) on board various vessels he used to travel among the islands of the Pacific Ocean.

The Maori Wars prompted many English people to leave New Zealand and the Hector family, with the exception of George Nelson Hector, moved to Australia. Hector's mother, Elizabeth, died at Victoria Street, Surry Hills, Sydney, New South Wales, on Wednesday 22 September 1847, aged 42.

== Hector in America ==
Hector came to America in or before 1878. At the time, Melbourne was known as Crane Creek. Hector became the first postmaster and operated a general store.

He was influential in the naming of the city of Melbourne, although there are several versions of the story. Mrs. R.W. Goode is credited with suggesting the name to honor Hector, although he is said to have favored a different name. Straws representing various names were drawn by Grace Goode, and the "Melbourne" straw was the one drawn.

Hector was confirmed at Holy Trinity Episcopal Church on 21 April 1887, at the age of 51. He married Ida M. Gard on 10 October 1895, at Holy Trinity United.

Hector died at Crescent City, Florida, on 6 January 1898, and was buried at the Melbourne Cemetery.
