= Myles Building =

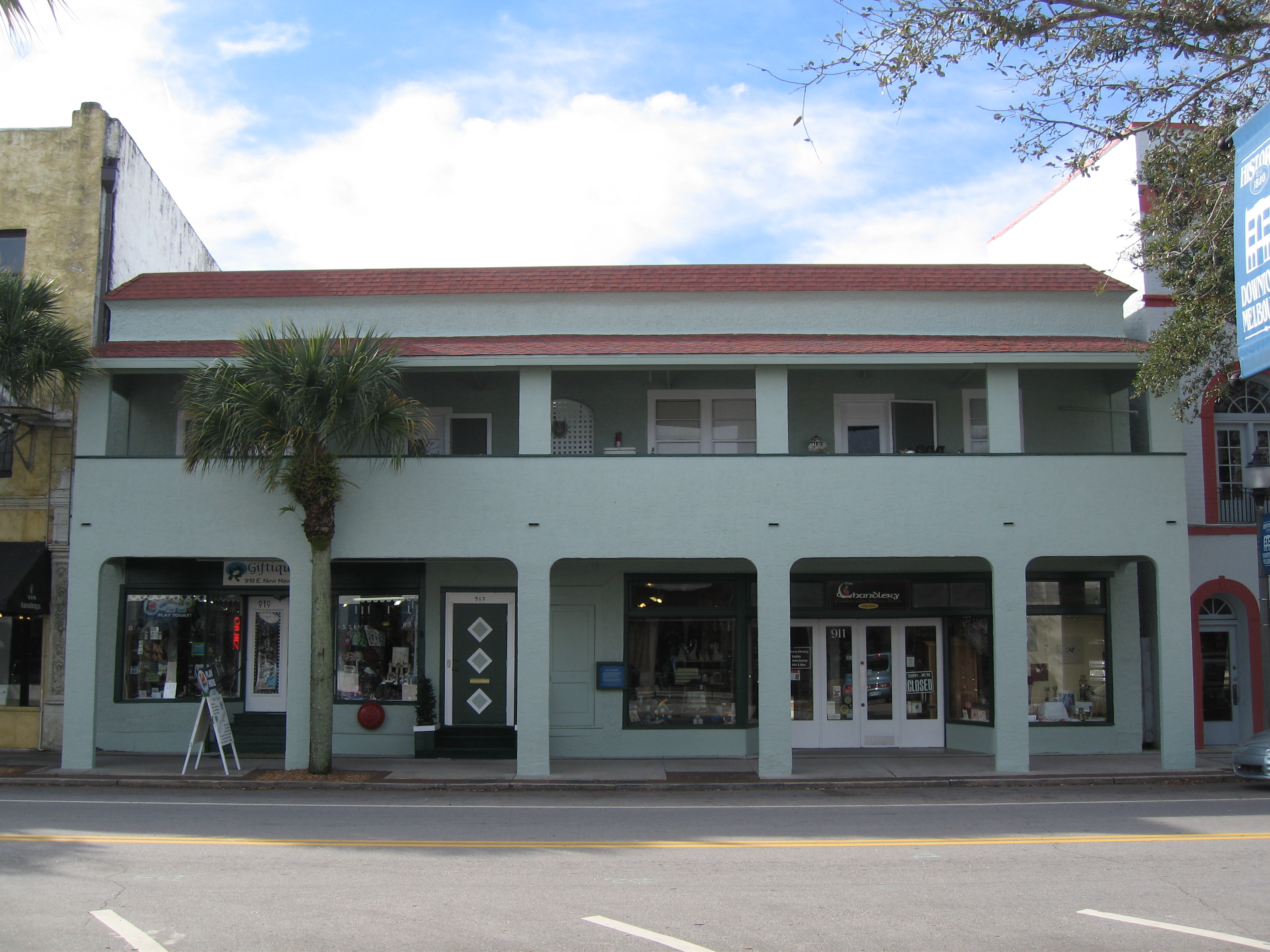
- Interactive map of the Myles Building area

General information
- Location: 911-919 East New Haven Avenue; Melbourne, Florida, United States
- Coordinates: 28.07822°N 80.60548°W
- Completed: 1913

Technical details
- Size: 2 stories

The Myles Building is a historic building located at 911-919 East New Haven Avenue, Melbourne, Florida. This two-story building was constructed in 1913 and included a restaurant and billiard parlor on the first floor and the Midway Hotel on the second. Soon after completion, the Melbourne Times newspaper relocated to the Myles Building. Part of the building was also used as a temporary classroom when the local schools ran out of space. After prohibition ended, Shorty's Bar opened at the billiard parlor and according to legend, gangster Al Capone played pool there.

== Gallery ==
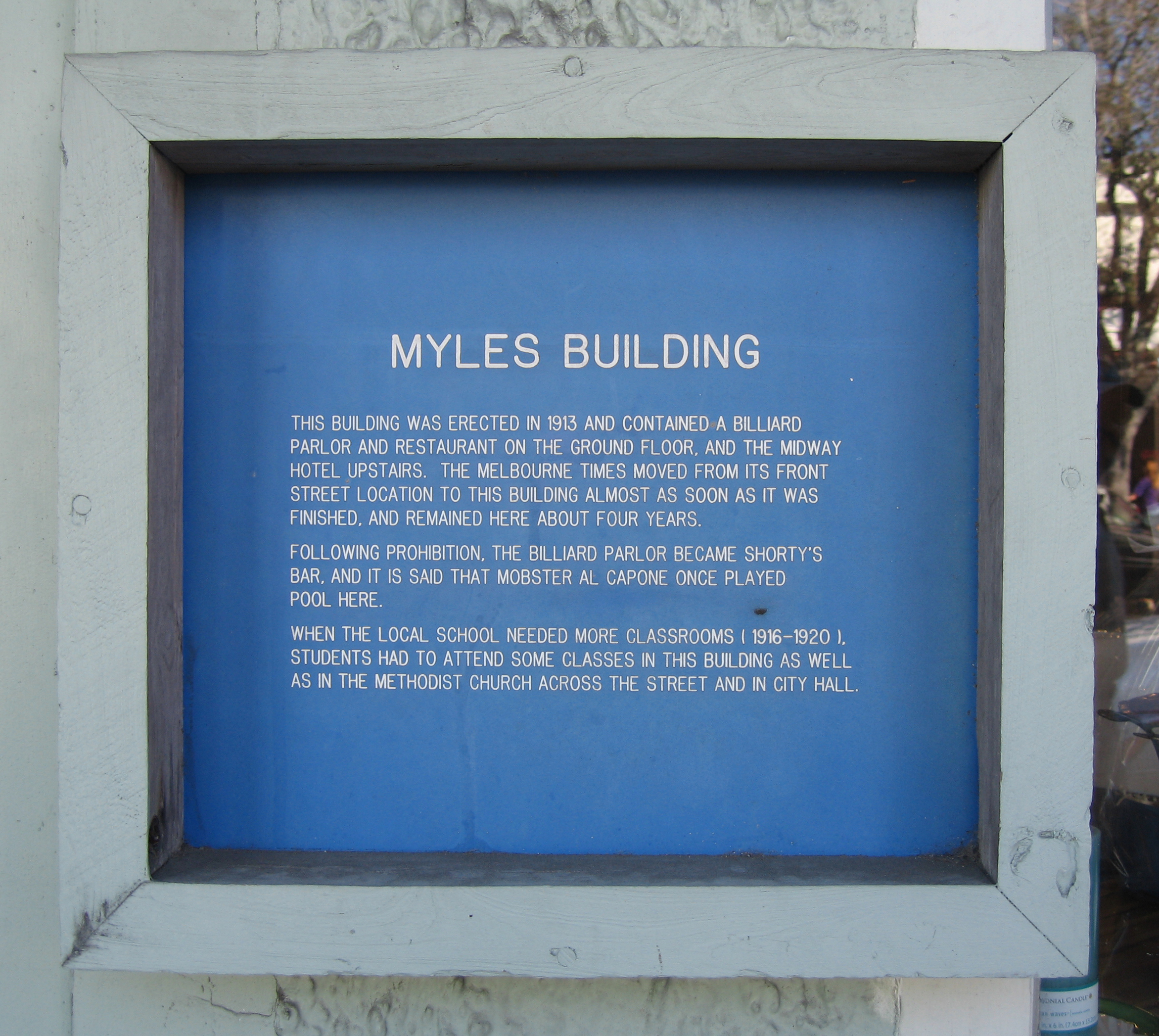
Historical Marker for the Myles Building
