= Henegar Center =

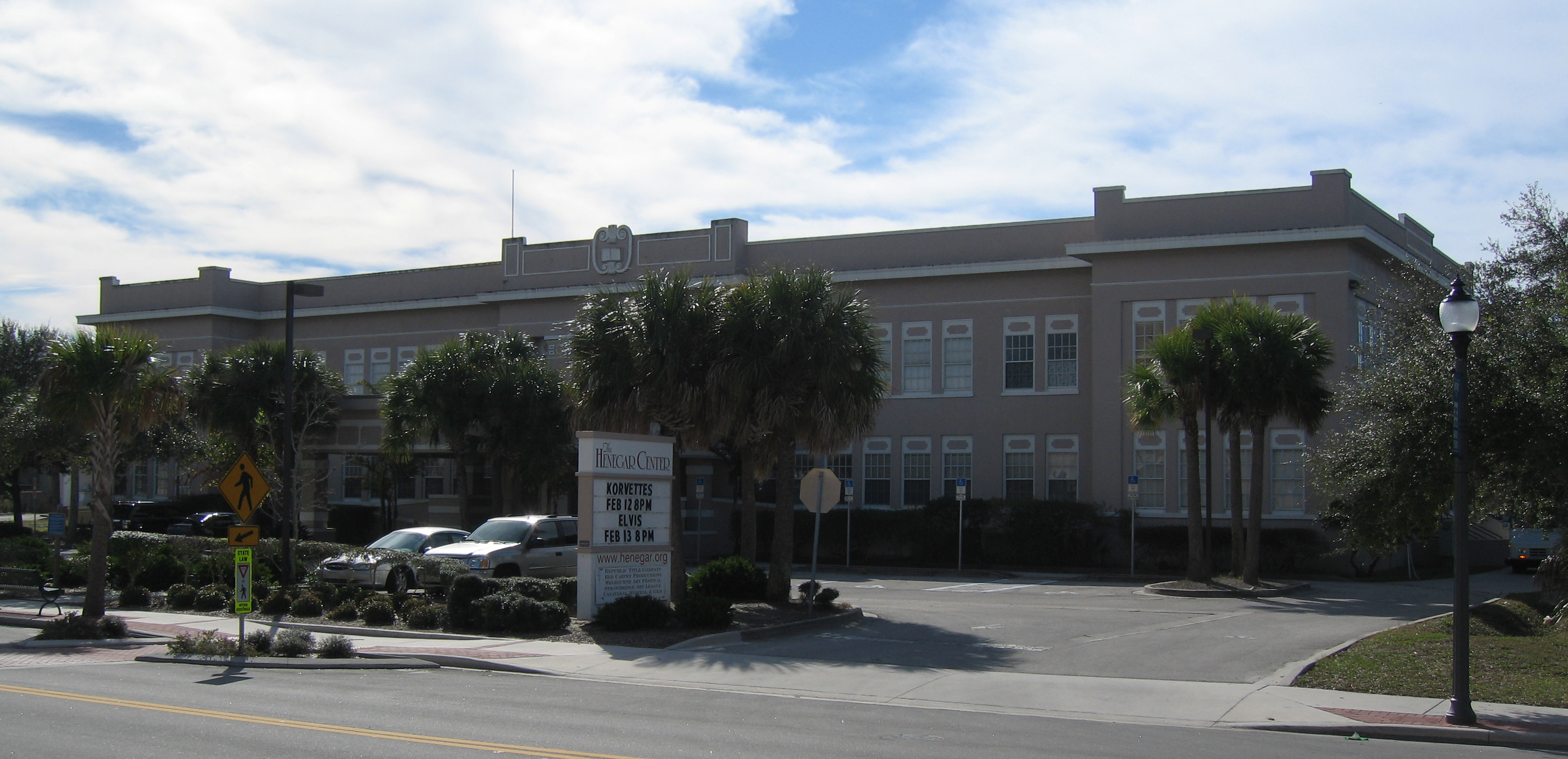
- Henegar Center
- Interactive map of the Henegar Center area

General information
- Architectural style: Neoclassical
- Location: 625 East New Haven Avenue; Melbourne, Florida, United States
- Coordinates: 28.07805°N 80.61025°W
- Construction started: 1919
- Client: Brevard County

The Henegar Center is a historic U.S. building located at 625 East New Haven Avenue, Melbourne, Florida. Built in 1919, it is one of Brevard County’s oldest public buildings. On March 12, 1963, the building received its name in honor of Ruth Henegar, a long-time teacher and principal at the school that used the building at the time. The building now serves as The Henegar Center for the Arts.

== The Henegar Center for the Arts ==
=== Elementary school ===
The school building was designed by W.M. Christen.

Construction began in 1919 and in the fall of 1920 the building opened. It was soon to become the first of three structures to stand on the site. In 1963 the elementary school was named for former Principal Ruth Henegar (1950–1951). In 1975 enrollment reached an all-time low of 331 students and the decision to close the school was made. On June 11, 1975 after 55 years the doors of the Ruth Henegar Elementary School closed.

=== Transition to arts ===
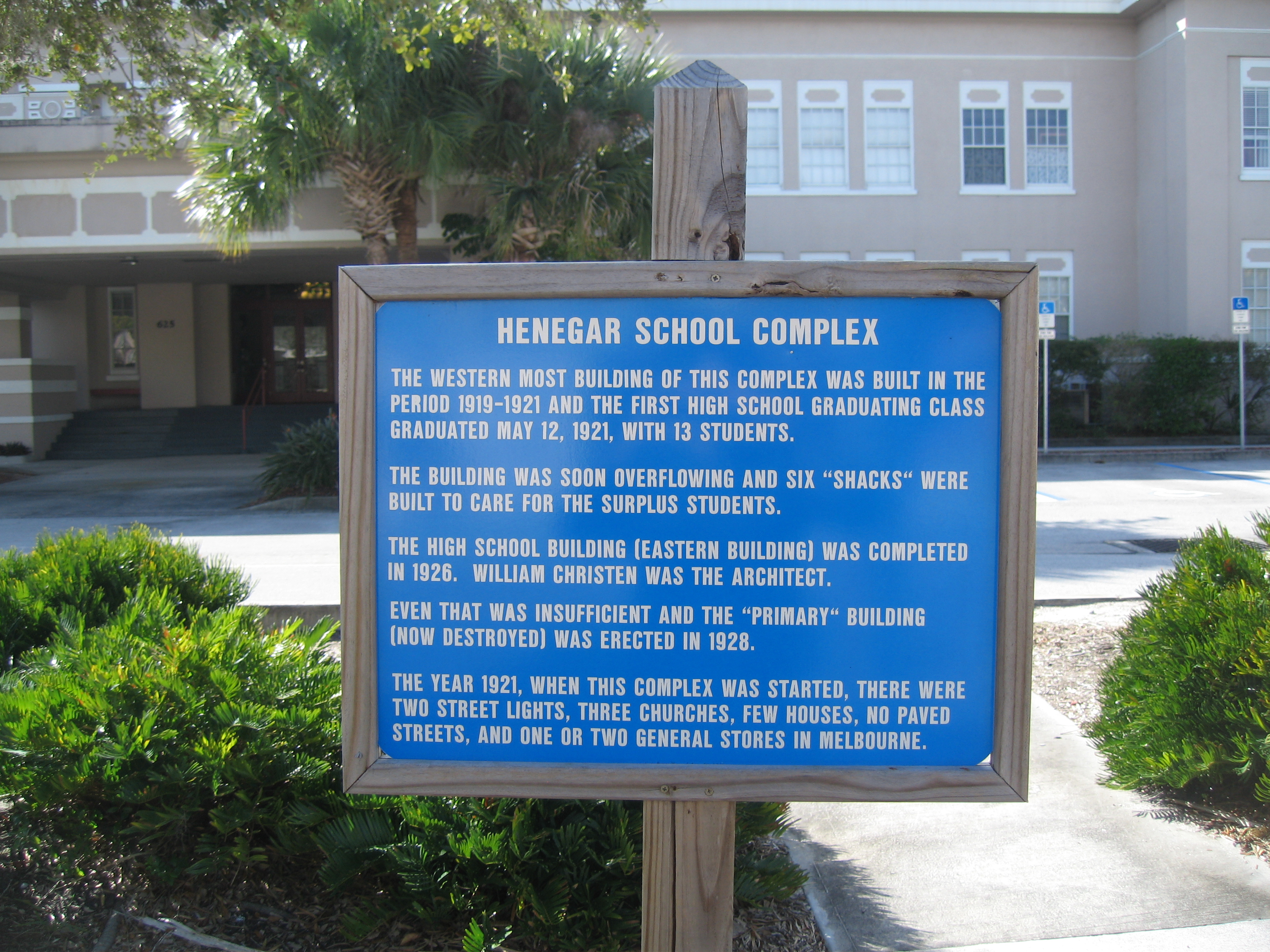
Henegar School Complex historical marker

The two remaining structures are some of the oldest standing public buildings in Brevard County. The Melbourne School Complex has housed many things prior to becoming the community cultural center that it is today. In the late 60’s both outer buildings were closed as instructional buildings and the west building (Trinity Towers South now occupies this land) housed Brevard Junior College (now Eastern Florida State College). The center building (Henegar Center) was used by the school board and other county offices. In 1980 the West building was demolished to make room for Trinity Towers South, in 1983 a small group of local residents acted and formed a non-profit corporation- the Brevard Regional Arts Group (BRAG) and went to work to restore the two remaining buildings. In 1984 The North Building Cultural Center was granted a forty- year renewable lease and BRAG was deeded the buildings by the Brevard County School System. BRAG mobilized the community and was able to raise $2.5 million in cash and contributed services and began the task of restoring the main building.

=== Main Stage ===
In 1991, the Henegar Center for the Arts opened its doors with a 475-seat proscenium style theater designed by Peter Feller. This theater is called the Main Stage. The curtain was from the Broadway Musical The King and I. State-of-the-art sound and lighting equipment was installed in order to present the highest quality productions. The main building contains the main ballroom, reception room, courtyard garden room, a mirrored dance studio and two additional meeting spaces. The public spaces contain rotating exhibitions of work by local artists.

=== Upstairs at the Henegar ===
A black box style theater called Upstairs at the Henegar was added in 2014. This theater is on the second floor and seats 85 people.
