= Melbourne, Florida =

- City
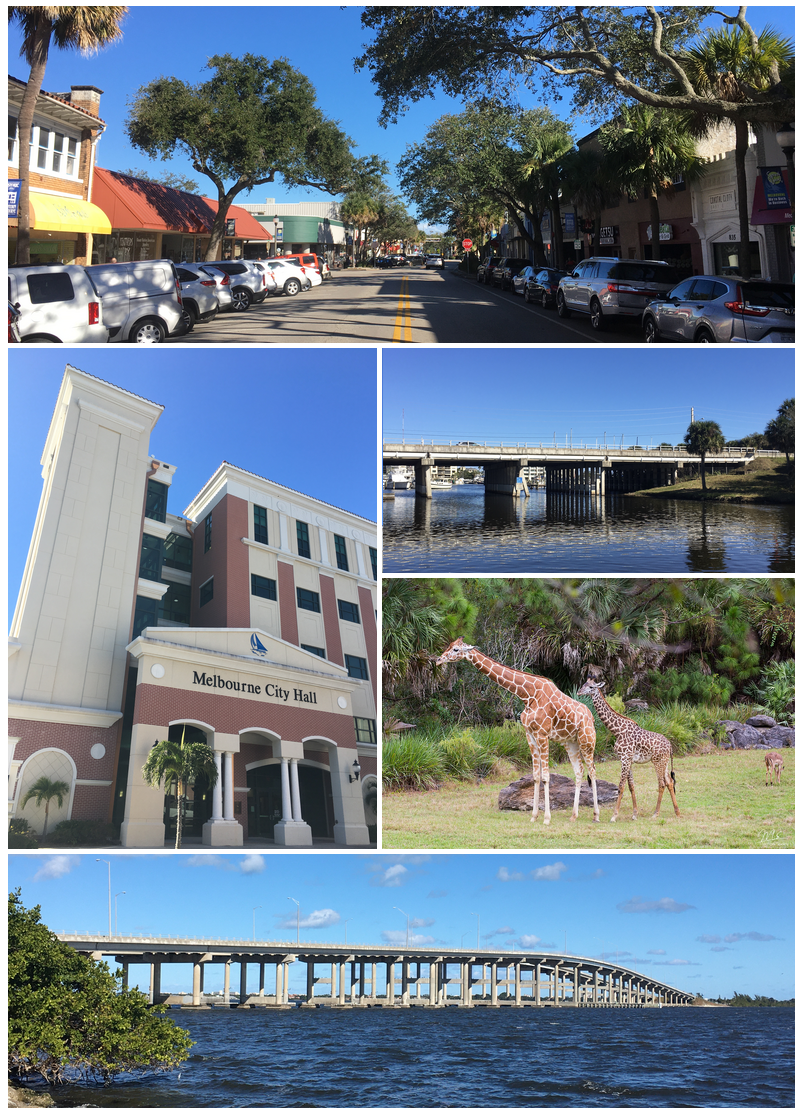
- Top, left to right: Downtown Melbourne, Melbourne City Hall, Crane Creek, Brevard Zoo, Melbourne Causeway

- Flag Seal Wordmark
- Nicknames: The Harbor City, The Midway City
- Location in Brevard County, Florida
- Coordinates: 28°06′30″N 80°38′25″W
- Country: United States
- State: Florida
- County: Brevard
- Settled: c. 1867
- Incorporated (village): December 22, 1888
- Consolidated with Eau Gallie: July 15, 1969
- Founder: Cornthwaite John Hector
- Named for: Melbourne, Australia

Government
  - Type: Council–manager

Area
  - Total: 49.97 sq mi (129.43 km^{2})
  - Land: 44.15 sq mi (114.36 km^{2})
  - Water: 5.82 sq mi (15.07 km^{2}) 14.4%
- Elevation: 26 ft (7.9 m)

Population (2020)
  - Total: 84,678
  - Density: 1,917.8/sq mi (740.47/km^{2})
- Time zone: UTC−5 (EST)
  - Summer (DST): UTC−4 (EDT)
- ZIP code: 32901, 32934, 32935, 32940, 32902, 32912, 32936, 32941, 32904
- Area code: 321
- FIPS code: 12-43975
- GNIS feature ID: 2405067
- Website: www.melbourneflorida.org

Melbourne (/ˈmɛlbɛrn/ MEL-burn) is a city in Brevard County, Florida, United States. It is located 72 miles (116 km) southeast of Orlando along Florida's Space Coast, so named because of the region's proximity to Cape Canaveral and the Kennedy Space Center. The city had an estimated population of 87,561 as of July 1, 2024, according to the U.S. Census Bureau. Melbourne is a principal city of the Palm Bay–Melbourne–Titusville metropolitan statistical area. Downtown Melbourne and most of the city lie inland of the Indian River Lagoon, with a small part extending over to the barrier island.

== History ==
=== Early human occupation ===
Evidence for the presence of Paleo-Indians in the Melbourne area during the late Pleistocene epoch was uncovered during the 1920s. C. P. Singleton, a Harvard University zoologist, discovered the bones of a mammoth (Mammuthus columbi) on his property along Crane Creek, 1.5 miles (2.4 km) from Melbourne, and brought in Amherst College paleontologist Frederick B. Loomis to excavate the skeleton. Loomis found a second elephant, with a "large, rough, flint instrument" among fragments of the elephant's ribs. Loomis found in the same stratum mammoth, mastodon, horse, ground sloth, tapir, peccary, camel, and sabertooth cat bones, all extinct in Florida since the end of the Pleistocene 10,000–8,000 BCE. At a nearby site, a human rib and charcoal were found in association with Mylodon, Megalonyx, and Chlamytherium (ground sloth) teeth. A finely worked spear point found with these items may have been displaced from a later stratum.

In 1925, attention shifted to the Melbourne golf course. A crushed human skull and finger, arm, and leg bones were found in association with a horse tooth. A piece of ivory that appeared to have been modified by humans was found at the bottom of the stratum containing bones. Other finds included a spear point near a mastodon bone and a turtle-back scraper and blade found with bear, camel, mastodon, horse, and tapir bones. Similar human remains, Pleistocene animals, and Paleo-Indian artifacts were found in Vero Beach, 30 miles (48 km) south of Melbourne, and similar Paleo-Indian artifacts were found at the Helen Blazes archaeological site, 10 miles (16 km) southwest of Melbourne.

=== Settlement ===
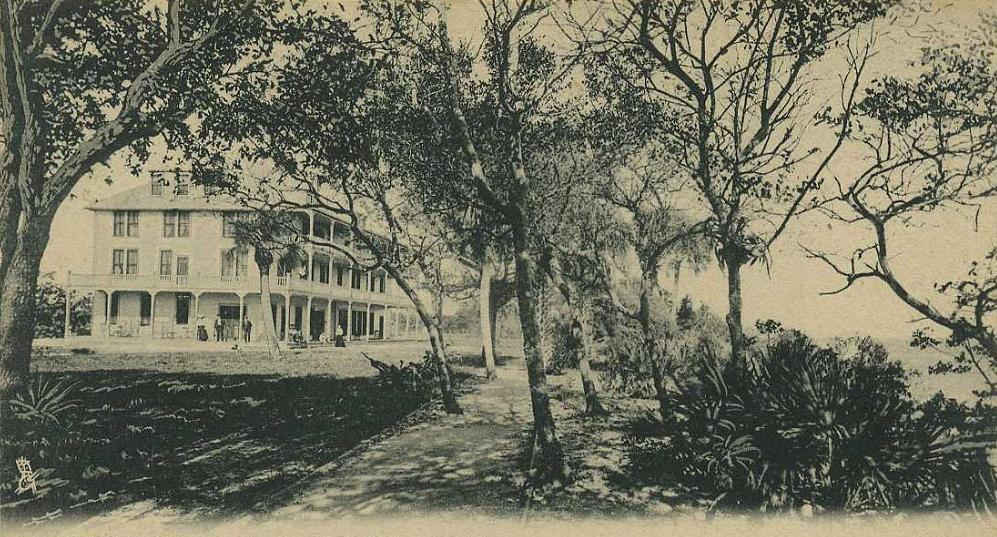
The Hotel Carleton c. 1907

The first settlers, who arrived after 1877, included Richard W. Goode, his father John Goode, Cornthwaite John Hector, Captain Peter Wright, Balaam Allen, Wright Brothers, and Thomas Mason. Three of these men, Wright, Allen, and Brothers were black freedmen.

The city, formerly called "Crane Creek", was named Melbourne in honor of its first postmaster, Cornthwaite John Hector, an Englishman who had spent much of his life in Melbourne, Victoria, Australia (which, in turn, was named after British Prime Minister William Lamb, 2nd Viscount Melbourne). He is buried in the Melbourne Cemetery, along with many early residents in the area. The first school in Melbourne, built in 1883, is on permanent exhibit on the campus of the Florida Institute of Technology. By 1885, the town had 70 people. The Greater Allen Chapel African Methodist Episcopal Church was founded in 1885 and is still active.

In the late 1890s, the Brownlie-Maxwell Funeral Home opened, and it is still in business. The oldest Black-owned business in the county is Tucker's Cut-Rate Plumbing. It opened in 1934.

In the early 1900s, houses were often built in the frame vernacular style. In 1919, a fire destroyed most of the original downtown along Front Street. At the time, it was rebuilt west of U.S. Route 1.

During the Jim Crow years, Black people were required to enter movie theaters by a different entrance from Whites and sit in the balcony. Gas stations had signs for restrooms labeled "Men", "Women", and "Colored". This persisted until integration in the late 1960s.

In late 1942, the Naval Air Station Melbourne was established as a site to train newly commissioned Navy and Marine pilots for World War II. The program ran until 1946, and the land that was used for that program makes up most of what is currently the Melbourne Orlando International Airport.

In 1969, the cities of Eau Gallie and Melbourne voted to merge, forming modern-day Melbourne.

=== Postwar ===
In the 1950s, Babcock Street was extended north to intersect with US 1. The Melbourne Shopping Center was constructed on Babcock, the area's first strip mall. Consumers were sufficiently attracted to this new mall that the traditional downtown, off New Haven, suffered. Urban blight was successfully mitigated in the 1980s.

A board was created by the legislature to spend a 10% tax on electric bills. This was used by the Melbourne Civic Improvement Board to build the Melbourne Auditorium, the first library and fire station, and various parks. The board was dissolved when Melbourne was merged with Eau Gallie in 1969. That merger doubled the size of Melbourne.

Streetlights were gradually added until by the early 1960s, streets east of Babcock Street had lights. Lights were added to streets west of Babcock after the early 1960s.

In 1969, the city elected Julius Montgomery, its first Black councilman. Montgomery was also the first African American student of Brevard Engineering College, later Florida Institute of Technology, which named their Pioneer Award after him.

On August 2, 1995, the city received a record 9.06 inches (230 mm) of rainfall from Hurricane Erin. During the week of August 22, 2008, a record 17.54 inches (446 mm) of rain fell, caused by Tropical Storm Fay.

A 2009 Halloween street party sponsored by a downtown restaurant attracted an estimated 8,000–10,000 people. This overwhelmed the downtown area. Street parties were curtailed until public-safety issues were addressed.

On February 18, 2017, president Donald Trump held his first postinauguration rally at the Orlando-Melbourne International Airport, drawing a crowd around 9,000 people according to the Melbourne police department.

== Geography ==
Melbourne is located about 60 miles (97 km) southeast of Orlando on the Space Coast, along Interstate 95. It is roughly midway between Jacksonville and Miami. According to the United States Census Bureau, the city has a total area of 39.6 square miles (102.5 km^{2}), of which 5.7 sq mi (14.8 km^{2}) (14.42%) are covered by water.

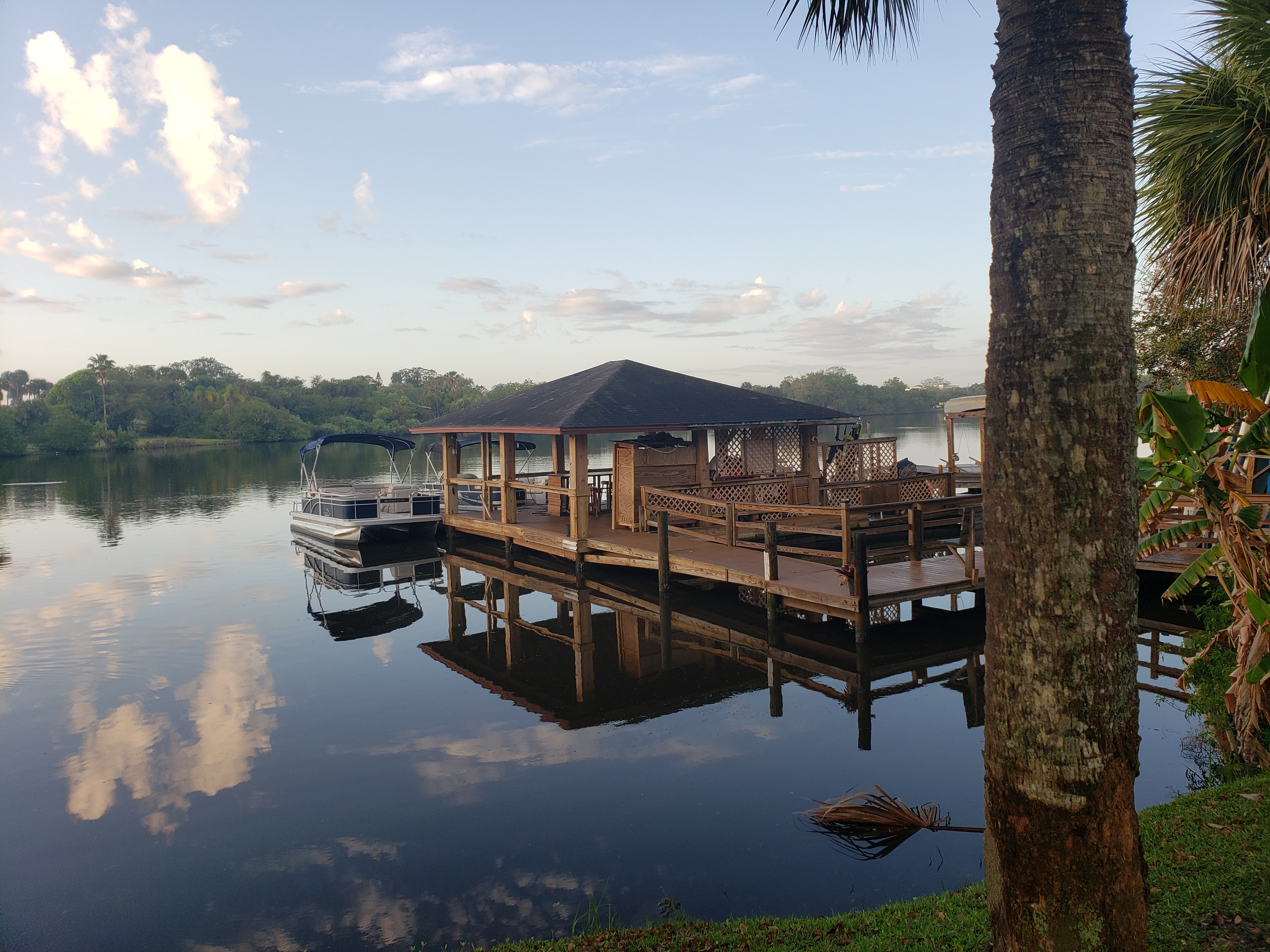
A dock for boating on Crane Creek, Melbourne

The east–west street named Brevard Drive was historically the "center" of town, with addresses called "north" and "south" of this street. The north–south Babcock Street provided the same centerline for "east" and "west" directions.

Melbourne Beachside has a small presence on the South Beaches barrier island. It is often confused with Melbourne Beach, a separate political entity.

=== Climate ===
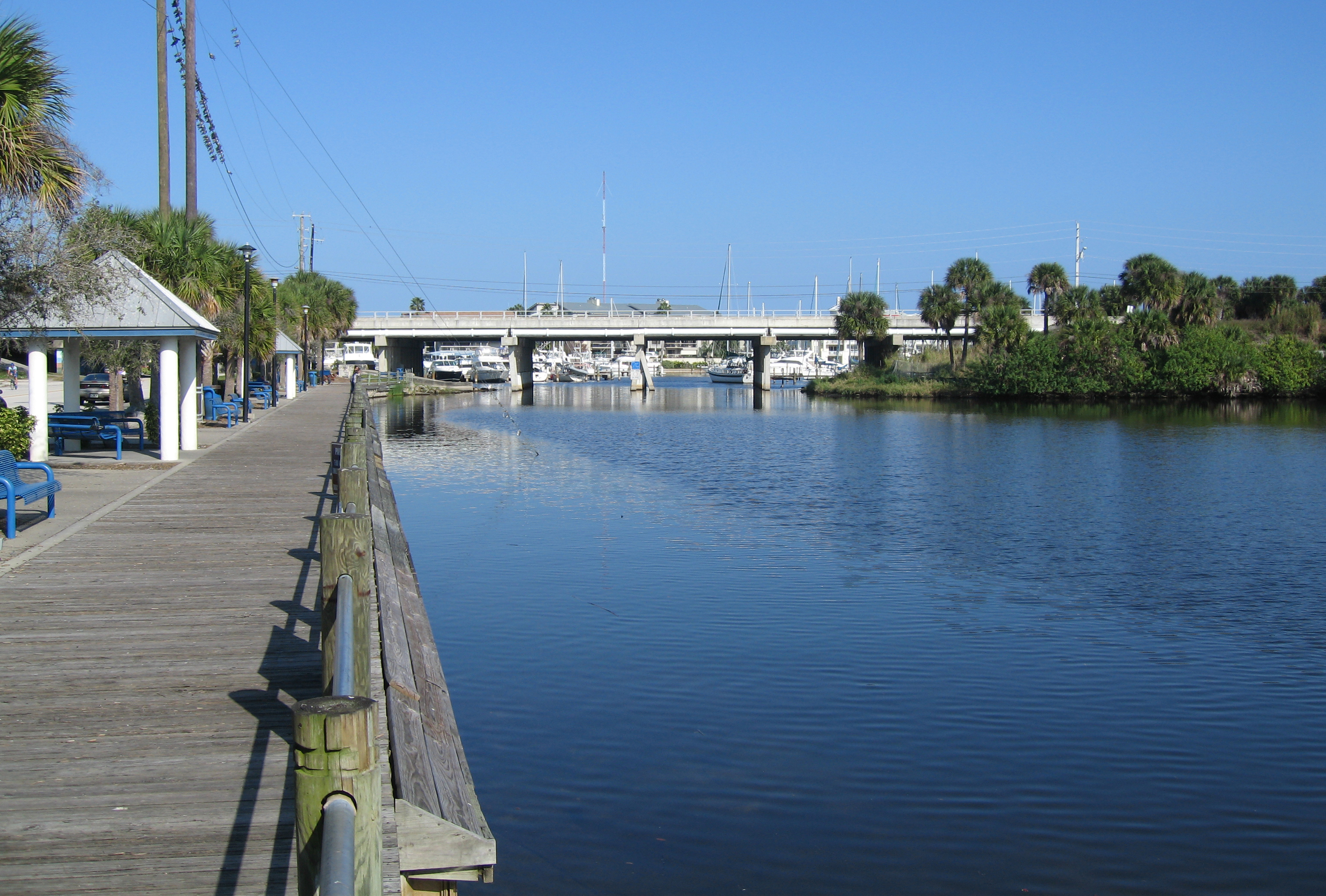
Crane Creek

Melbourne, Florida has a humid subtropical climate (Köppen climate classification Cfa), bordering closely to a tropical savanna climate (Aw). Melbourne has a distinctly seasonal precipitation pattern, with a hot and wet season (late May through October) and a warm and dry season (November through April). The climate is strongly influenced by the nearby Atlantic Ocean and Gulf Stream, as well as incursions of cold fronts from the north in winter.

Melbourne averages 51 inches (1,300 mm) of rainfall annually, much of it coming in convective thunderstorms from late May to early October. The record rainfall occurred on August 20, 2008, when Tropical Storm Fay dropped 18.21 inches (463 mm). Melbourne can sometimes have moderate to severe drought conditions from late fall through spring, with brush fires occurring and water restrictions put in place. Melbourne averages two days per year with frost, although several years might pass without a frost in the city of Melbourne or at the ocean beaches. On Christmas Eve 2003, the city, as did others on the east-central coast of Florida, received snow from the ocean effect, when cold air passes over the considerably hotter ocean and causes the rise of air with higher temperature to bring moisture into the higher portions of the atmosphere.

Climate data for Melbourne, Florida (Melbourne Orlando International Airport), 1991–2020 normals, extremes 1937–present
Month	Jan	Feb	Mar	Apr	May	Jun	Jul	Aug	Sep	Oct	Nov	Dec	Year
Record high °F (°C)	89 (32)	92 (33)	93 (34)	97 (36)	99 (37)	101 (38)	102 (39)	101 (38)	98 (37)	96 (36)	91 (33)	90 (32)	102 (39)
Mean maximum °F (°C)	83.8 (28.8)	85.6 (29.8)	88.8 (31.6)	90.2 (32.3)	93.1 (33.9)	94.7 (34.8)	95.5 (35.3)	94.8 (34.9)	93.0 (33.9)	90.1 (32.3)	86.1 (30.1)	83.9 (28.8)	96.6 (35.9)
Mean daily maximum °F (°C)	71.8 (22.1)	74.0 (23.3)	77.1 (25.1)	80.9 (27.2)	84.9 (29.4)	88.1 (31.2)	89.7 (32.1)	89.3 (31.8)	87.6 (30.9)	83.5 (28.6)	77.3 (25.2)	73.9 (23.3)	81.5 (27.5)
Daily mean °F (°C)	61.7 (16.5)	64.0 (17.8)	67.4 (19.7)	71.8 (22.1)	76.8 (24.9)	80.6 (27.0)	81.7 (27.6)	82.0 (27.8)	80.6 (27.0)	76.3 (24.6)	69.0 (20.6)	64.7 (18.2)	73.0 (22.8)
Mean daily minimum °F (°C)	51.7 (10.9)	54.0 (12.2)	57.7 (14.3)	62.8 (17.1)	68.6 (20.3)	73.1 (22.8)	73.7 (23.2)	74.7 (23.7)	73.7 (23.2)	69.0 (20.6)	60.8 (16.0)	55.6 (13.1)	64.6 (18.1)
Mean minimum °F (°C)	33.9 (1.1)	36.8 (2.7)	41.5 (5.3)	48.2 (9.0)	58.3 (14.6)	67.5 (19.7)	70.0 (21.1)	70.9 (21.6)	68.3 (20.2)	54.0 (12.2)	44.7 (7.1)	37.9 (3.3)	32.1 (0.1)
Record low °F (°C)	19 (−7)	24 (−4)	25 (−4)	35 (2)	47 (8)	55 (13)	60 (16)	60 (16)	57 (14)	41 (5)	30 (−1)	21 (−6)	19 (−7)
Average precipitation inches (mm)	2.63 (67)	1.98 (50)	2.69 (68)	2.29 (58)	3.53 (90)	7.10 (180)	6.50 (165)	6.67 (169)	7.63 (194)	4.86 (123)	2.55 (65)	2.36 (60)	50.79 (1,290)
Average precipitation days (≥ 0.01 in)	7.0	6.6	6.8	6.4	8.5	13.9	14.4	15.0	14.5	10.2	7.7	8.5	119.5
Source: NOAA

=== Flora ===
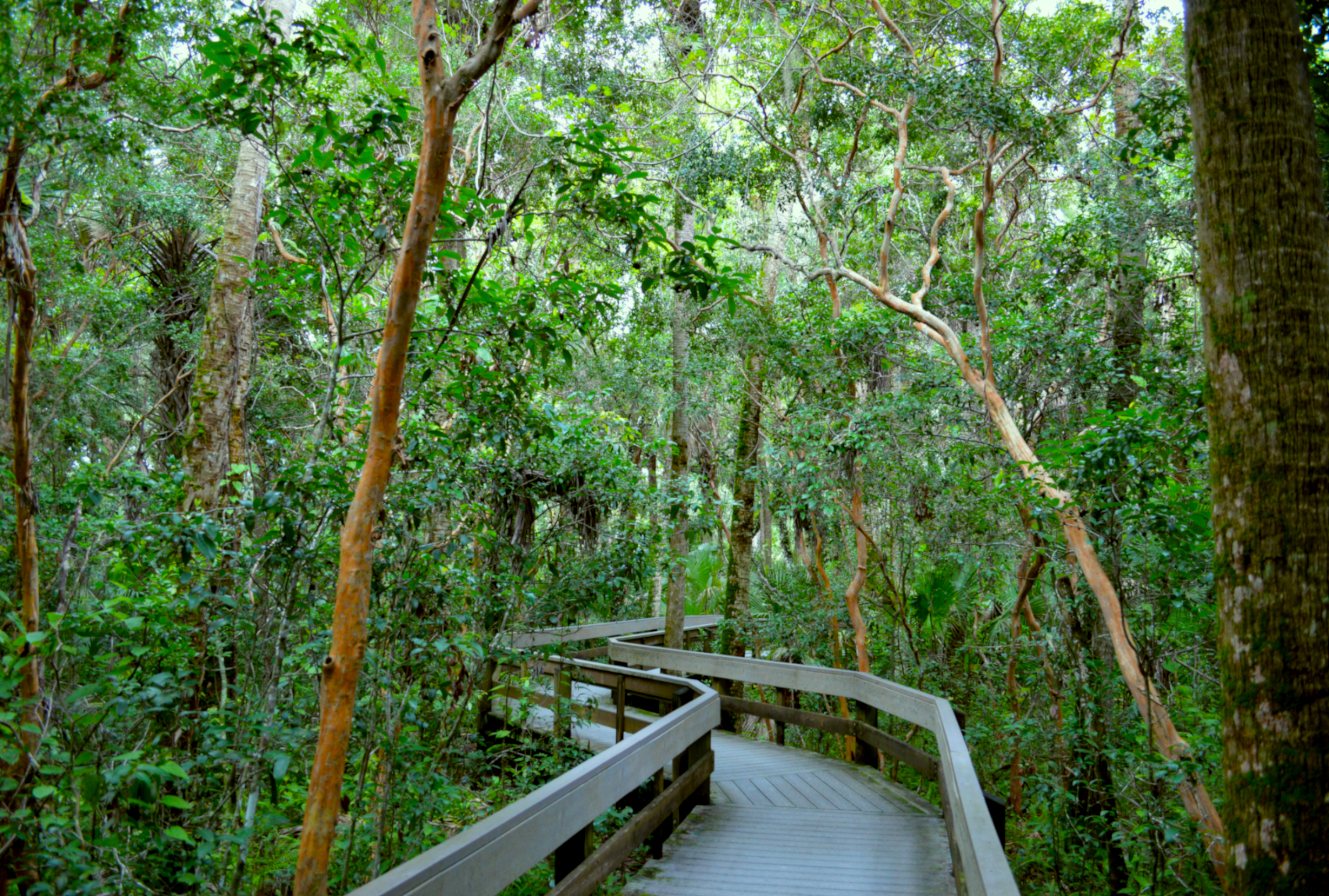
Various native flora in Erna Nixon Park.

Tropical flora typical of more southerly locations is grown in the Melbourne area (coconut palms, royal palms, Christmas palms, and bananas), but can be damaged or killed when subjected to infrequent light freezes or cooler temperatures, although several years might pass without a freeze in the Melbourne area. The area has many lush gardens and public landscapes, and is noted for the botanical northern limit of cultivated coconut palms on the Florida East Coast.

=== Environment ===
The Florida Department of Environmental Protection has ordered the city to reduce pollution of the Indian River Lagoon, which it borders; about 80% of the city's landmass drains in the direction of the lagoon. The city must reduce run-off by 44,000 pounds (20,000 kg) of nitrogen and 13,000 pounds (5,900 kg) of phosphorus. The city responded by banning the use of fertilizer before flood and storm warnings.

== Demographics ==
Historical population
Census	Pop.	Note	%±
1890	99		—
1900	131		32.3%
1910	157		19.8%
1920	533		239.5%
1930	2,677		402.3%
1940	2,622		−2.1%
1950	4,223		61.1%
1960	11,982		183.7%
1970	40,236		235.8%
1980	46,536		15.7%
1990	59,646		28.2%
2000	71,382		19.7%
2010	76,068		6.6%
2020	84,678		11.3%
U.S. Decennial Census

=== Racial and ethnic composition ===
Melbourne, Florida – Racial and ethnic composition Note: the US Census treats Hispanic/Latino as an ethnic category. This table excludes Latinos from the racial categories and assigns them to a separate category. Hispanics/Latinos may be of any race.
Race / Ethnicity (NH = Non-Hispanic)	Pop 2000	Pop 2010	Pop 2020	% 2000	% 2010	% 2020
White (NH)	57,600	57,149	57,743	80.69%	75.13%	68.19%
Black or African American (NH)	6,493	7,553	8,070	9.10%	9.93%	9.53%
Native American or Alaska Native (NH)	218	184	213	0.31%	0.24%	0.25%
Asian (NH)	1,639	2,331	3,063	2.30%	3.06%	3.62%
Pacific Islander or Native Hawaiian (NH)	34	53	42	0.05%	0.07%	0.05%
Some other race (NH)	137	162	528	0.19%	0.21%	0.62%
Multiracial (NH)	1,303	1,842	4,365	1.83%	2.42%	5.15%
Hispanic or Latino (any race)	3,958	6,794	10,654	5.54%	8.93%	12.58%
Total	71,382	76,068	84,678	100.00%	100.00%	100.00%

=== 2020 census ===
As of the 2020 census, Melbourne had a population of 84,678. The median age was 44.4 years. 17.0% of residents were under the age of 18 and 22.7% of residents were 65 years of age or older. For every 100 females there were 95.5 males, and for every 100 females age 18 and over there were 93.3 males age 18 and over.

99.8% of residents lived in urban areas, while 0.2% lived in rural areas.

There were 37,290 households in Melbourne, of which 21.4% had children under the age of 18 living in them. Of all households, 36.5% were married-couple households, 23.0% were households with a male householder and no spouse or partner present, and 32.8% were households with a female householder and no spouse or partner present. About 35.6% of all households were made up of individuals and 16.2% had someone living alone who was 65 years of age or older.

There were 41,397 housing units, of which 9.9% were vacant. The homeowner vacancy rate was 1.8% and the rental vacancy rate was 9.1%.

Racial composition as of the 2020 census
Race	Number	Percent
White	60,349	71.3%
Black or African American	8,424	9.9%
American Indian and Alaska Native	379	0.4%
Asian	3,105	3.7%
Native Hawaiian and Other Pacific Islander	49	0.1%
Some other race	3,516	4.2%
Two or more races	8,856	10.5%
Hispanic or Latino (of any race)	10,654	12.6%

=== 2010 census ===
As of the 2010 United States census, 76,068 people, 33,377 households, and 18,394 families were living in the city.

=== 2000 census ===
As of 2000, 24.0% of the households had children under 18 living with them, 44.0% were married couples living together, 11.5% had a female householder with no husband present, and 40.7% were not families. About 32.9% of all households were made up of individuals, and 13.3% had someone living alone who was 65or older. The average household size was 2.22 and the average family size was 2.82.

In 2000, the city's age distribution was 20.7% under 18, 9.3% from 18 to 24, 28.4% from 25 to 44, 21.9% from 45 to 64, and 19.7% who were 65 or older. The median age was 40 years. For every 100 females, there were 94.3 males. For every 100 females 18 and over, there were 91.1 males.

As of 2000, per capita income for the city was $19,175. In 2000, the median income for a household in the city was $34,571 and for a family was $42,760. Males had a median income of $32,242 versus $22,419 for females. In Melbourne, about 8.6% of families and 11.5% of the population were below the poverty line, including 15.4% of those under 18 and 8.5% of those 65 or over.

=== Languages ===
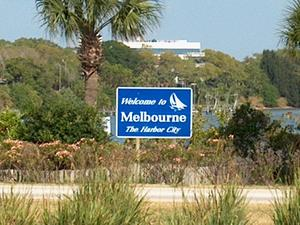
A visitor welcome sign for Melbourne.

As of 2000, 90.39% of residents spoke English as their first language, while 4.69% spoke Spanish, 0.84% spoke French, 0.73% spoke German, and 0.55% spoke Arabic as their mother tongue. In total, 9.60% of the total population spoke languages other than English.

== Government ==
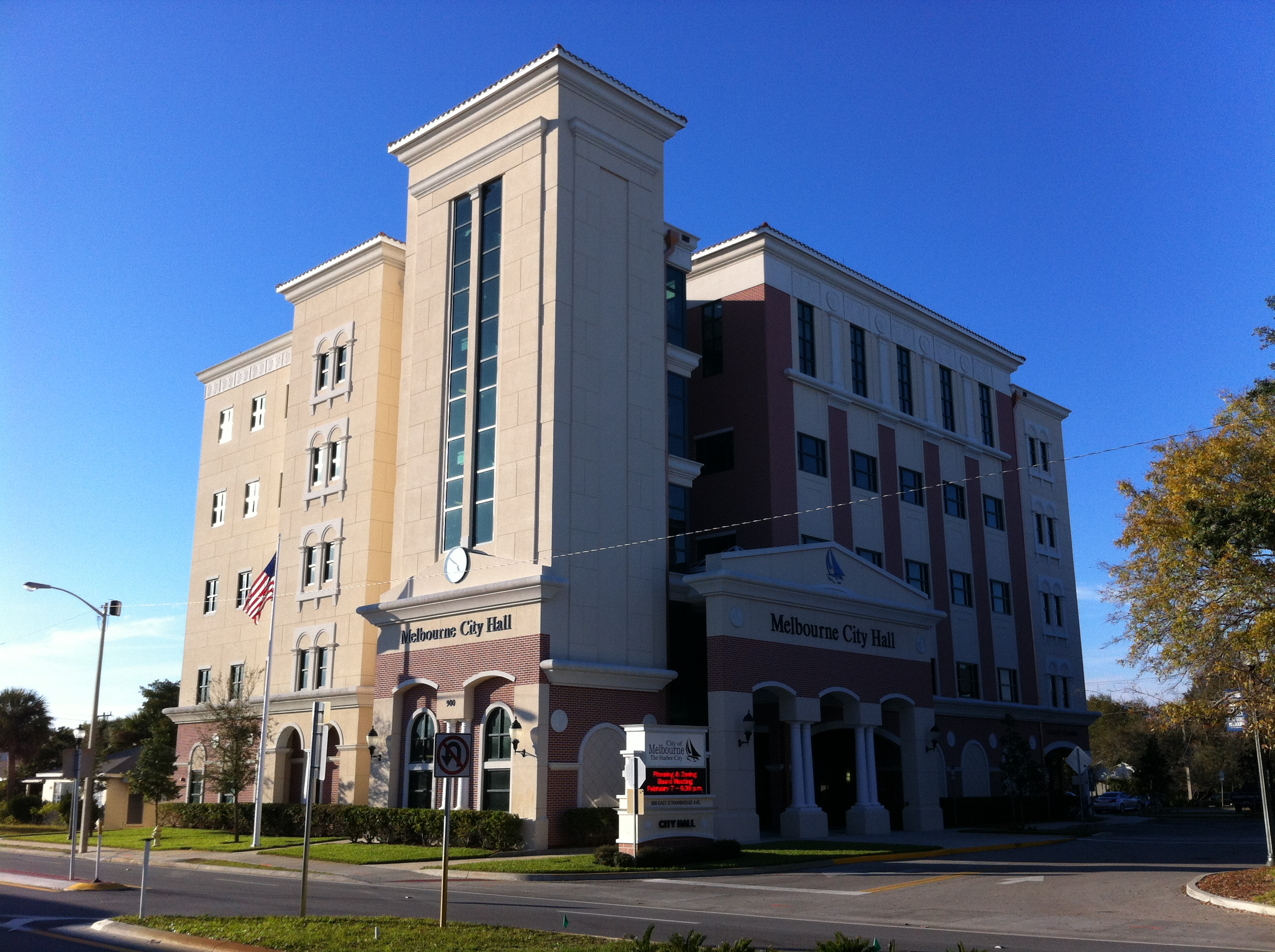
Melbourne City Hall

The Melbourne City Council consists of the mayor and six district council members. Melbourne uses a council-manager form of government.

City officials

- Paul Alfrey, Mayor – Elected November 2020, reelected November 2024, term expires November 2028.
- Marcus Smith, District 1 Council Member – Elected in November 2024, term expires November 2028.
- Mark LaRusso, District 2 Council Member – Elected in November 2018. Re-elected in November 2022, term expires November 2026
- David Neuman, District 3 Council Member – elected in November 2024, term expires November 2028
- Rachael Bassett, District 4 Council Member – elected in November 2022, term expires November 2026
- Mimi Hanley, District 5 Council Member – elected in November 2020, reelected November 2024, term expires November 2028.
- Julie Kennedy, Vice Mayor and District 6 Council Member – elected in November 2018, re-elected in November 2022, term expires November 2026

The following are appointed by the council:

- City attorney
- City manager

Melbourne city officials created the Babcock Street Redevelopment District in 1998 to stimulate new development along Babcock Street from U.S. 1 south to U.S. 192. A 218-unit apartment complex built in 2005 is the most recent step to revitalize this area.

In 2010, the Eau Gallie Arts District received its designation as a Florida Main Street. Established in 1860 along the Indian River, the arts district (called EGAD!) has proven to be highly successful in its redevelopment of the community of art galleries, shops, restaurants, and Melbourne's first microbrewery, and contains the city civic center and public library with a public pier, Historic Rossetter House and Gardens, Pineapple Park, a few businesses over 40 years old, and a community park and band shell, which is the center of many community activities. It is now an unaccredited main street program.

A $180.8 million operating and capital budget was passed for the 2014–2015 fiscal year.

In 2007, the city had a taxable real-estate base of $4.96 billion.

A 2011 study rated the general pension fund for city employees highly at 190%. Less favorably rated were the pension plans for fire and police employees.

In 2009, the city had 870 full-time and 176 part-time employees.

== Economy ==
=== Industry ===
Melbourne Orlando International Airport is located near the center of the city. Melbourne contains defense and technology companies with a high concentration of high-tech workers. The following corporations have operations in Melbourne:

- Leonardo DRS, employed 1,300 workers in 2010.
- Alstom Signaling Operations Transportation Systems
- L3Harris Technologies (corporate headquarters)
- Northrop Grumman employed 1,640 workers in 2009.
- Rockwell Collins employed 1,430 in 2009.
- Embraer completed a 89,000 square feet (8,300 m^{2}) hangar and administrative office at the Melbourne Airport in February 2011.
- LiveTV had its headquarters in Melbourne. LiveTV became defunct in 2014.
- eviCore Healthcare has one of its main office in Melbourne.
- Avidyne Corporation an avionics company has their HQ in Melbourne and is a developer of Integrated Avionics Systems, multi-function displays, and traffic advisory systems for light general aviation (GA) aircraft.

=== Workforce ===
In 2007, the average size of Melbourne's labor force was 39,391. Of that group, 37,708 were employed and 1,683 were unemployed, for an unemployment rate of 4.3%.

=== Housing ===
In 2008, 259 building permits were issued for 263 units. There were 209 permits issued for 320 units in 2007, which was down from 329 permits for 512 units in 2006.

The median home price in 2007 was $215,000.

In May 2005, the Melbourne–Titusville–Palm Bay area was among the top 20 in home price appreciation from 2003 to 2004.

=== Competitiveness ===
In 2009, Forbes ranked the area 18th out of 100 metropolitan statistical areas and first of eight such areas in Florida for affordable housing and short commute times, among other factors.

=== Retail and commerce ===
Melbourne has two downtown business districts, a result of the merger of Eau Gallie into Melbourne:

- Eau Gallie Arts District—located along the Indian River Lagoon with two public parks, two fine art galleries, a microbrewery, and several other restaurants contained within one block. Known as EGAD, it is on the Florida Humanities FLORIDA STORIES historic audio-based walking tours app (downloadablee from the app store) and contains over 30 murals and three sculptures.
- Historic Downtown Melbourne – among other retail outlets, this has 26 eating and drinking establishments within a four-block area.

=== Healthcare ===
The city has three hospitals, a day care for senior citizens, a hospice, and walk-in and urgent-care facilities. Holmes Medical Center and Melbourne Regional Medical Center offer medical care; Kindred Hospital is a chronic-care facility for ventilated patients and does not accept emergency patients. A new Viera Hospital was opened in May 2011.

=== Tourism ===
The city has two golf courses. About 96,477 rounds were played in 2009–10. Revenues were $2,207,502. Rounds and revenue have been dropping since 2006; in 2011, the city raised rates for residents to the same as for nonresidents, $27 per round or $522 annual fee.

The Eau Gallie Arts District is regularly highlighted as a top destination in the national rankings that are published. Read more.

=== Retail ===
Brevard Mall, the area's first mall, was built in 1962. It was followed by Melbourne Square in 1982.

== Arts and culture ==
=== Annual cultural events ===
- The Annual IndiaFest is held in February or March.
- The Melbourne Arts Festival, held in April in Wickham Park, draws from 50,000 to 60,000 visitors.
- The Annual India Day is held in August.
- The Melbourne Area Pilots Association hosts a General Aviation Day at Melbourne International Airport in September.
- The Melbourne Oktoberfest has been held each October since 1977; most recently, this was held at the Wickham Park Pavilion

In December:

- Christian churches have been producing a "Bible on Parade" since 1990; each participating church portrays a book of the Bible. A spokesperson said in 2011 that it may be the only one of its kind in America.

=== Museums and points of interest ===
==== Historic sites ====
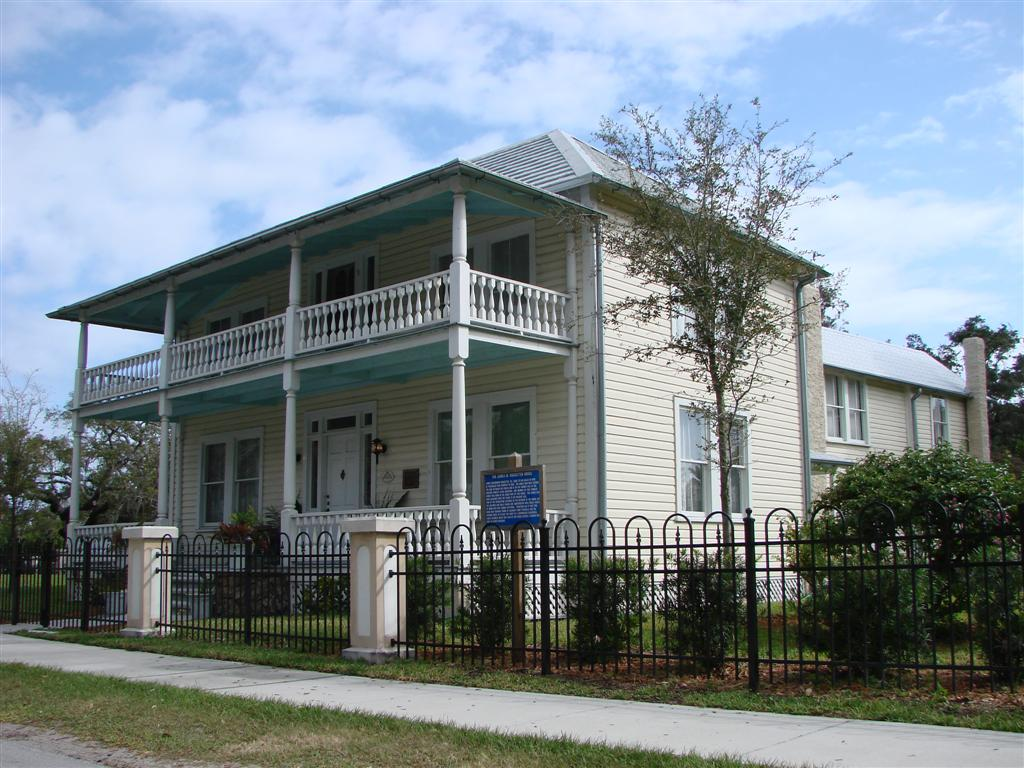
Rossetter House

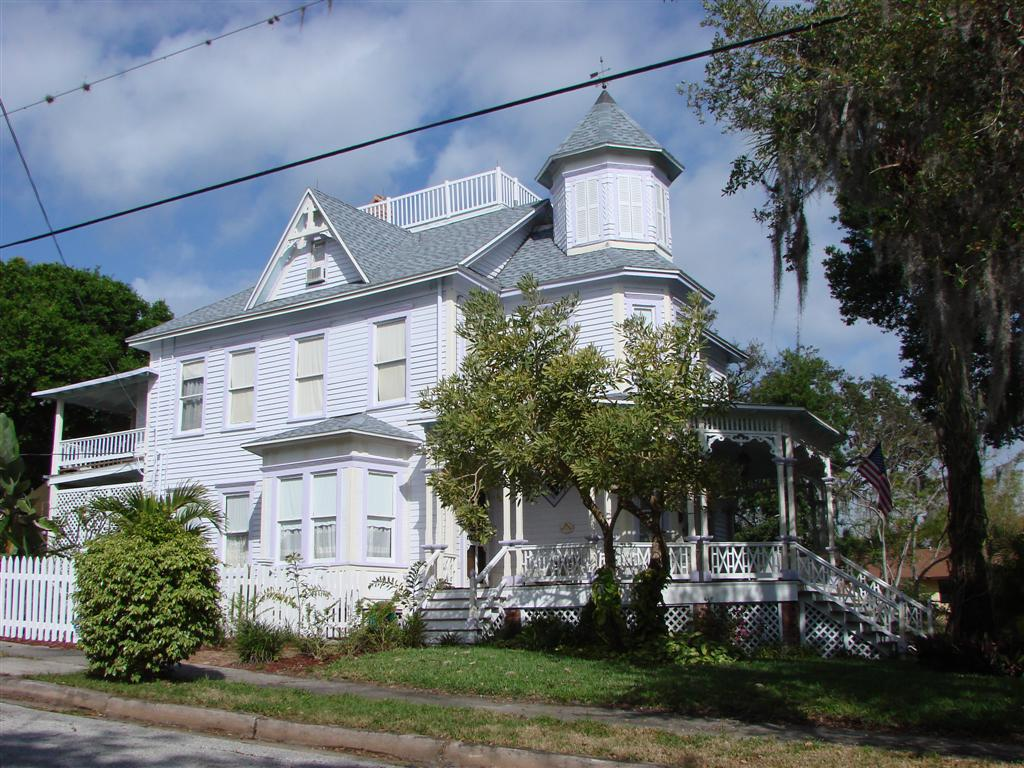
Gleason House

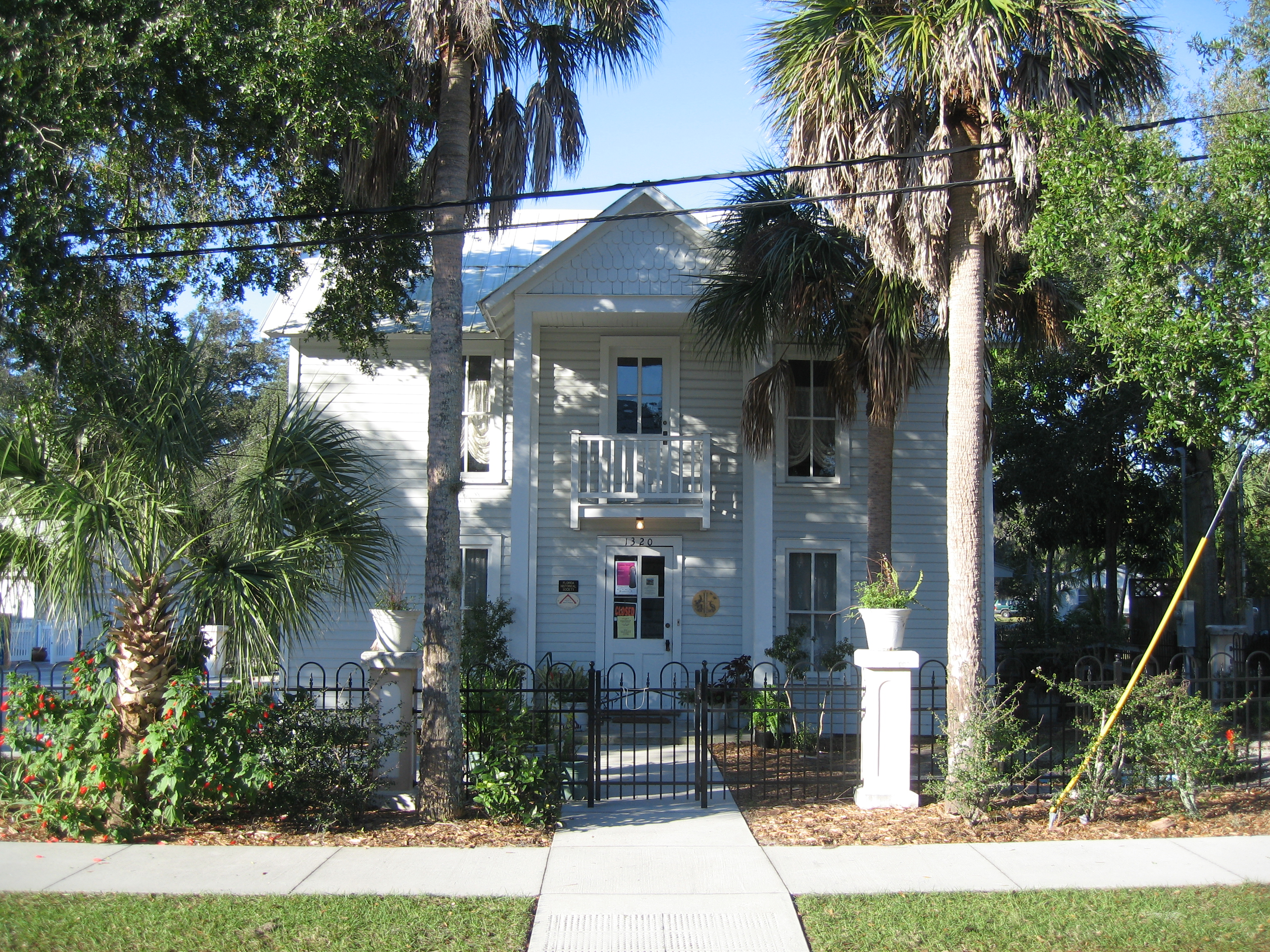
Roesch House

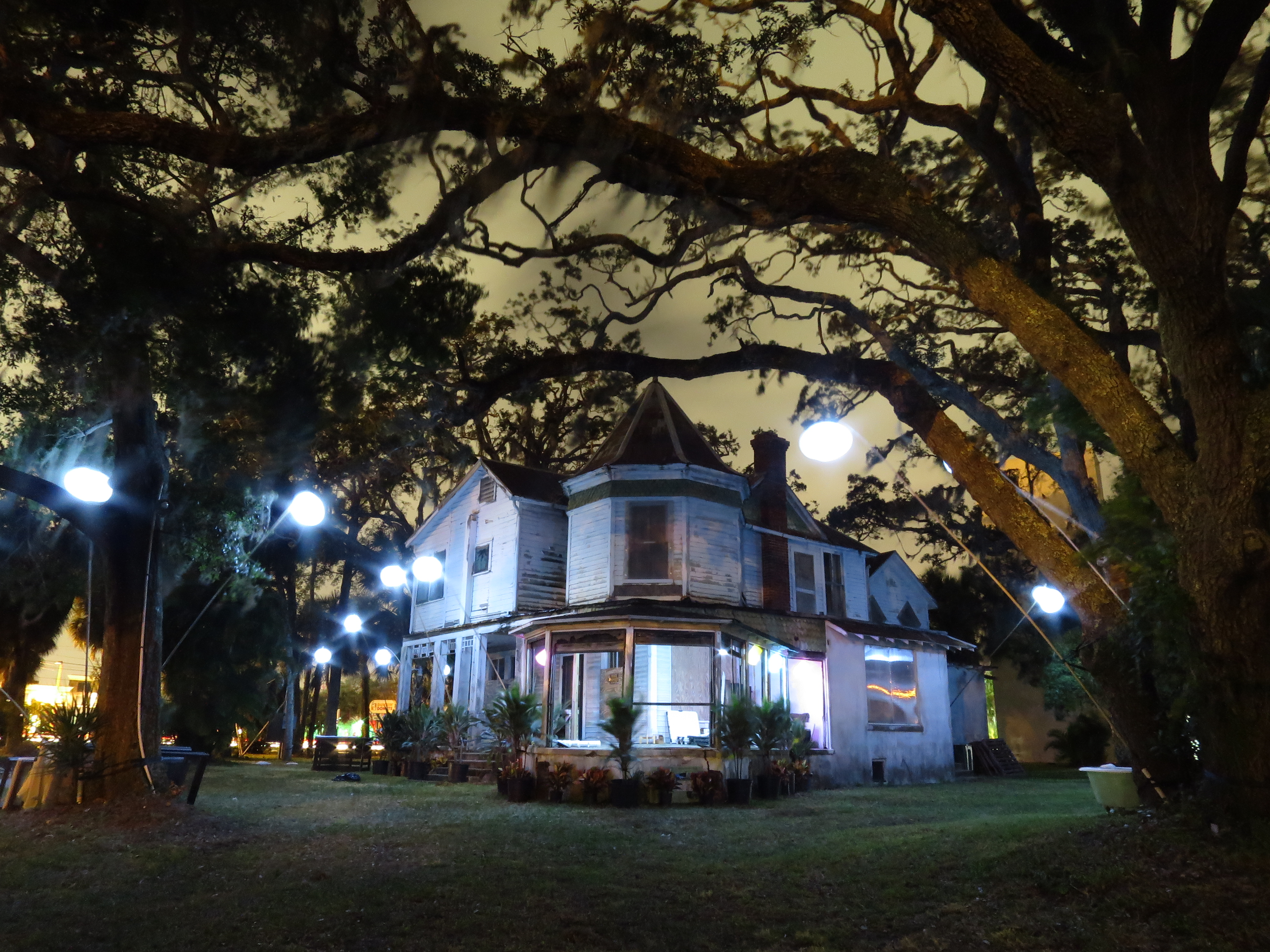
Wells House, "Green Gables"

There are four places on the National Register of Historic Places:

- Florida Power and Light Company Ice Plant (1927) located at 1604 South Harbor City Boulevard
- William H. Gleason House at 1736 Pineapple Avenue
- James Wadsworth Rossetter House (c. 1860s) at 1320 Highland Avenue
- Green Gables at Historic Riverview Village 1501 South Harbor City Blvd

The following places also are historic:

- Henegar Center (1919) located at 625 East New Haven Avenue
- Holy Trinity Episcopal Church (1886) at 50 West Strawbridge Avenue
- Melbourne Bone Bed at Crane Creek
- Myles Building (1913) – 911-919 East New Haven Avenue
- Nannie Lee House – Strawberry Mansion (1905) at 1218 East New Haven Avenue
- Roesch House (circa 1901) at 1320 Highland Avenue
- Winchester Symphony House (1890s) at 1500 Highland Avenue

Walking historic tours

Eau Gallie Arts District has an established historical walking tour that includes over 20 historical buildings or locations in the arts district available through a FLORIDA STORIES app to your phone.

==== Museums ====
- Historic Rossetter House Museum at 1320 Highland Avenue
- Liberty Bell Memorial Museum at 1601 Hickory Street

=== Performing arts ===
- Melbourne Civic Theater

==== Groups ====
- Brevard Symphony Orchestra
- City of Melbourne Pipes and Drums
- Strawbridge Art League and Gallery

==== Buildings ====
- Henegar Center for the Arts
- Maxwell C. King Center for the Performing Arts
- Melbourne Auditorium located on Hibiscus Boulevard

== Sports ==
Melbourne was an official host city for the 1996 Olympic Torch Relay.

Co-educational adult and youth sports programs are offered in flag football and ultimate frisbee.

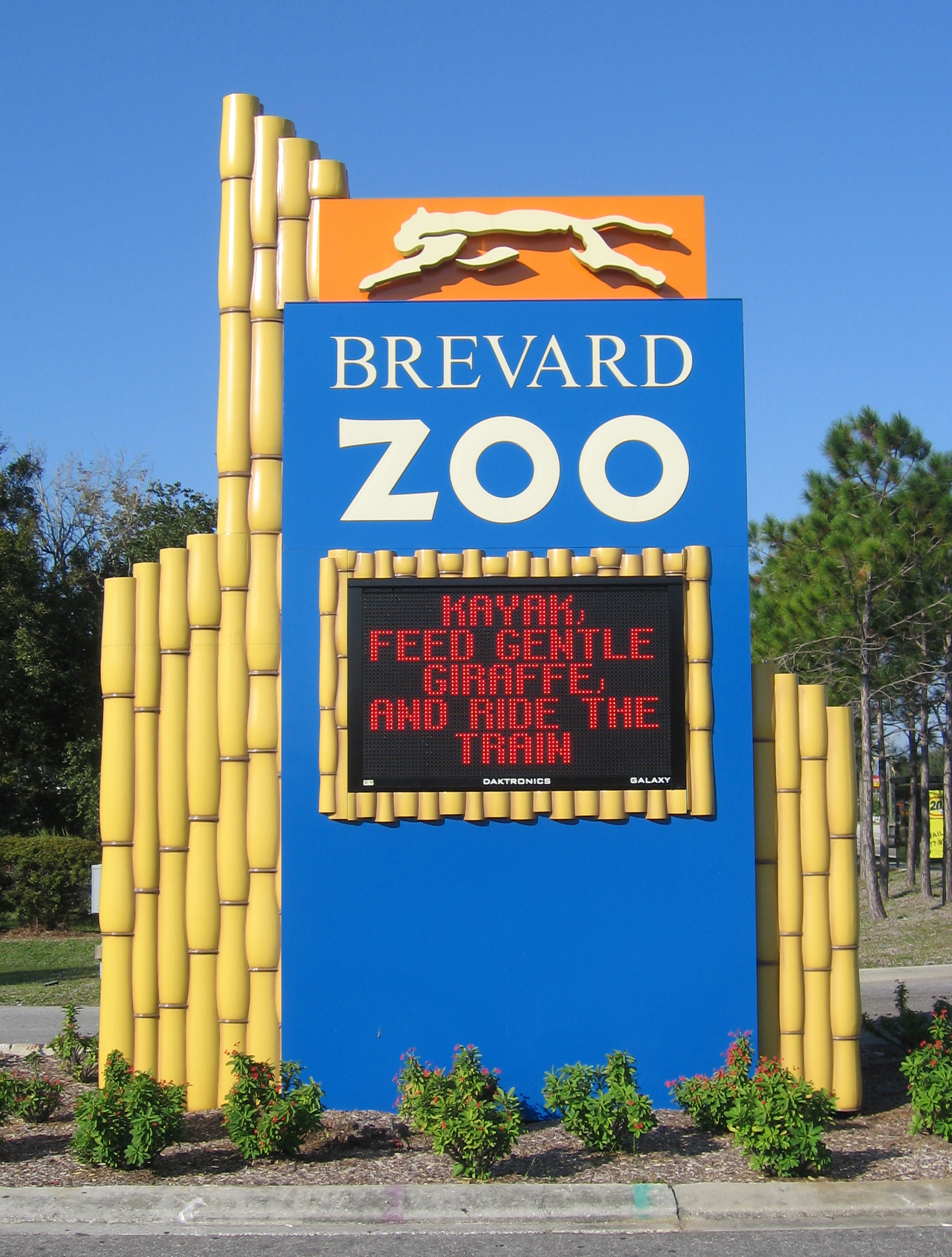
Brevard Zoo

The city of Melbourne hosts an annual indoor pickleball tournament called the Melbourne Meltdown Pickleball Championship. The third annual tournament was played on March 4–6, 2021, at the Melbourne Auditorium.

== Parks, recreation, and attractions ==
The city of Melbourne contains over 554.72 acres (2.2 km^{2}) of city park land, including 17 community parks, 13 neighborhood parks, and five smaller city parks.

- Brevard Zoo
- Wickham Park
- Lake Washington
- Erna Nixon Park

One of the many forms of recreation is local fishing in places such as Lake Washington.

== Public libraries ==
Melbourne houses three branches of Brevard County Public Libraries including the Dr. Martin Luther King Jr. Public Library, Eau Gallie Public Library, and the Melbourne Public Library.

The first home of the Melbourne Public Library was established in 1924 with funds raised by the Library Association of Melbourne. The current Melbourne Public Library is a 25,000 square ft building located in Wells Park. It was first opened to the public in July 1989.

The Eau Gallie Public Library was also first opened in the 1920s, starting as a library for the Eau Gallie Woman's Club. In 1939, the club officially sponsored the small library, beginning with only 22 books. The current building opened in 1962, gradually expanding over the years. In October, 1990 the Eau Gallie Public Library had a collection of 67,023 volumes and over 25,000 registered borrowers, a testament to the faith of the founders of the Eau Gallie Woman's Club. The library is located in Riverfront Park overlooking the Indian River.

== Education ==
Of all residents 25 years or older, 88.5% are high school graduates, and 25.7% have a bachelor's degree or higher.

Public schools are run by the Brevard County School Board.

Prior to 1964, segregated schools were maintained for White and Black students under the doctrine of separate but equal education. Black students were educated at Melbourne Vocational School from 1921 until it burned in 1953. For the next five years, the students met in the former hospital of the Naval Air Station, until Stone High School was opened in 1958. In 1964, the schools were integrated and Stone was repurposed as Stone Middle School.

=== Colleges and universities ===
- Burrell College of Osteopathic Medicine – Florida Campus at FIT
- Eastern Florida State College
- Florida Institute of Technology
- Florida State University – satellite campus
- Keiser University – Melbourne
- University of Central Florida – regional campus
- Webster University – Patrick Space Force Base campus

=== Elementary schools ===
- Roy Allen Elementary
- Ascension Catholic School
- Brevard Academy for Individual Excellence
- Dr. W. J. Creel Elementary
- Croton Elementary
- Harbor City Elementary
- Holy Trinity Episcopal Academy Lower School (Pre-K–6)
- Longleaf Elementary
- Meadowlane Primary
- Meadowlane Intermediate
- New Covenant Christian School
- Our Lady of Lourdes Catholic School
- Quest Elementary
- Sabal Elementary
- Sherwood Elementary
- Suntree Elementary
- University Park Elementary
- West Melbourne Elementary

=== Middle schools ===
- Ascension Catholic School
- Brevard Academy for Individual Excellence
- DeLaura Middle School
- Central Middle School
- Covenant Christian School
- Florida Preparatory Academy
- Holy Trinity Episcopal Academy Upper School
- Johnson Middle School
- Our Lady of Lourdes Catholic School
- Stone Middle School

=== High schools ===
Public

- Eau Gallie High School
- Melbourne High School
- Palm Bay High School
- West Shore Junior – Senior High School

Private

- Brevard Academy for Individual Excellence
- Brevard Christian School
- Florida Preparatory Academy
- Holy Trinity Episcopal Academy Upper School
- Melbourne Central Catholic High School
- New Covenant Christian School

=== Adult education ===
- Palm Bay High Adult/Community Education
- South Area Adult Center

== Media ==
=== Print ===
Brevard Business News is a weekly newspaper in Melbourne, covering business news and trends for the Space Coast. Fred Krupski started Brevard Business News in 1981, and Adrienne B. Roth purchased it in 1986.

Florida Today is the major daily newspaper serving Brevard County, Florida. The Gannett corporation started the paper in 1966. It covers the Space Coast and Central Florida. The other major paper is the Hometown News ln Melbourne.

=== Radio ===
WFIT 89.5 FM—this radio station is an NPR station based on the grounds of Florida Institute of Technology

=== Television ===
Melbourne is part of the Orlando television market. Cable is provided by Spectrum.

== Infrastructure ==
=== Transportation ===
==== Major roads ====
The city is responsible for about 300 miles (480 km) of road. It would like to resurface 5% (15 miles (24 km)) of that each year. It was able to afford to pave half of that in 2013.

Roads in the older part of the city, in what is today the southeast, are oriented toward the north–south road, Babcock Street, with compass directions measured east and west from that road. In the same area, a very minor east–west road, Brevard Drive, separates compass directions north and south.

- U.S. 1 – Known officially as Harbor City Boulevard, this road runs parallel to the Indian River on the far eastern side of the city. The highway is six-lanes throughout the city. Within the city limits, this road intersects two causeways: the Eau Gallie and Melbourne Causeways. Major intersections include University Boulevard, New Haven Avenue, U.S. 192, SR 508, CR 507, CR 5054, SR 518, CR 511, Lake Washington Road, and Post Road.
- U.S. 192 – Locally named New Haven Avenue, and Strawbridge Avenue in downtown, this road passes through commercial, entertainment, and retail areas of Melbourne. It serves as a route to Kissimmee and the tourist corridor of Orlando to the west, and the town of Indialantic to the east via the Melbourne Causeway. Major intersections include Evans Road/Hollywood Boulevard, Dairy Road, SR 507/CR 507, New Haven Avenue, and U.S. 1.
- Interstate 95 – This highway is six-lanes throughout its run in Melbourne. There are three exits within city limits: Exit 180 (U.S. 192), Exit 182 (Ellis Road), and Exit 183 (SR 518).
- SR A1A – This road runs along the barrier island portion of Melbourne and provides access to Indian Harbour Beach and Indialantic. There is only one major intersection: SR 518.
- SR 507 – The state road portion of Babcock Street, this road runs from the city limits of Palm Bay to U.S. 192, serving the Florida Institute of Technology along the way. Major intersections include Florida Avenue, University Boulevard, and U.S. 192.
- CR 507 – The county road portion of Babcock Street, this road runs from U.S. 192 to U.S. 1, serving one of the main economic centers of Melbourne. Major intersections include U.S. 192, SR 508, and U.S. 1.
- SR 508 – This road runs from U.S. 1 to the Melbourne Orlando International Airport. Major intersections include Air Terminal Parkway, Dr. Martin Luther King Jr. Boulevard, CR 507, and U.S. 1.
- CR 509 – Known locally as Wickham Road, this is one of the busiest roads in Melbourne: Up to 38,680 cars use Wickham Road weekdays, and the average is 33,850. Major intersections include Ellis Road/NASA Boulevard, SR 5054/CR 5054, SR 518, CR 511, Lake Washington Boulevard, and Post Road.
- CR 511 – Known almost universally as John Rodes Boulevard while north–south and Aurora Road while east–west, this road enters from West Melbourne and ends at U.S. 1, running through some impoverished areas of the town. Major intersections include Ellis Road, SR 518, CR 509, and U.S. 1.
- SR 518 – Known locally as Eau Gallie Boulevard, this road's run is entirely in Melbourne, running from Interstate 95 to SR A1A over the Eau Gallie Causeway. It runs through the Eau Gallie Arts District. Major intersections include Interstate 95, SR 5054, CR 509, U.S. 1, SR 513, and SR A1A.
- SR 5054 – The state road designation being entirely unsigned, the road is mostly known as Sarno Road. It has a short run from SR 518 to CR 509, where Sarno Road continues as CR 5054.
- CR 5054 – The more urban portion of Sarno Road. Major intersections include CR 509, Croton Boulevard, Apollo Boulevard, and U.S. 1.

==== Rail ====
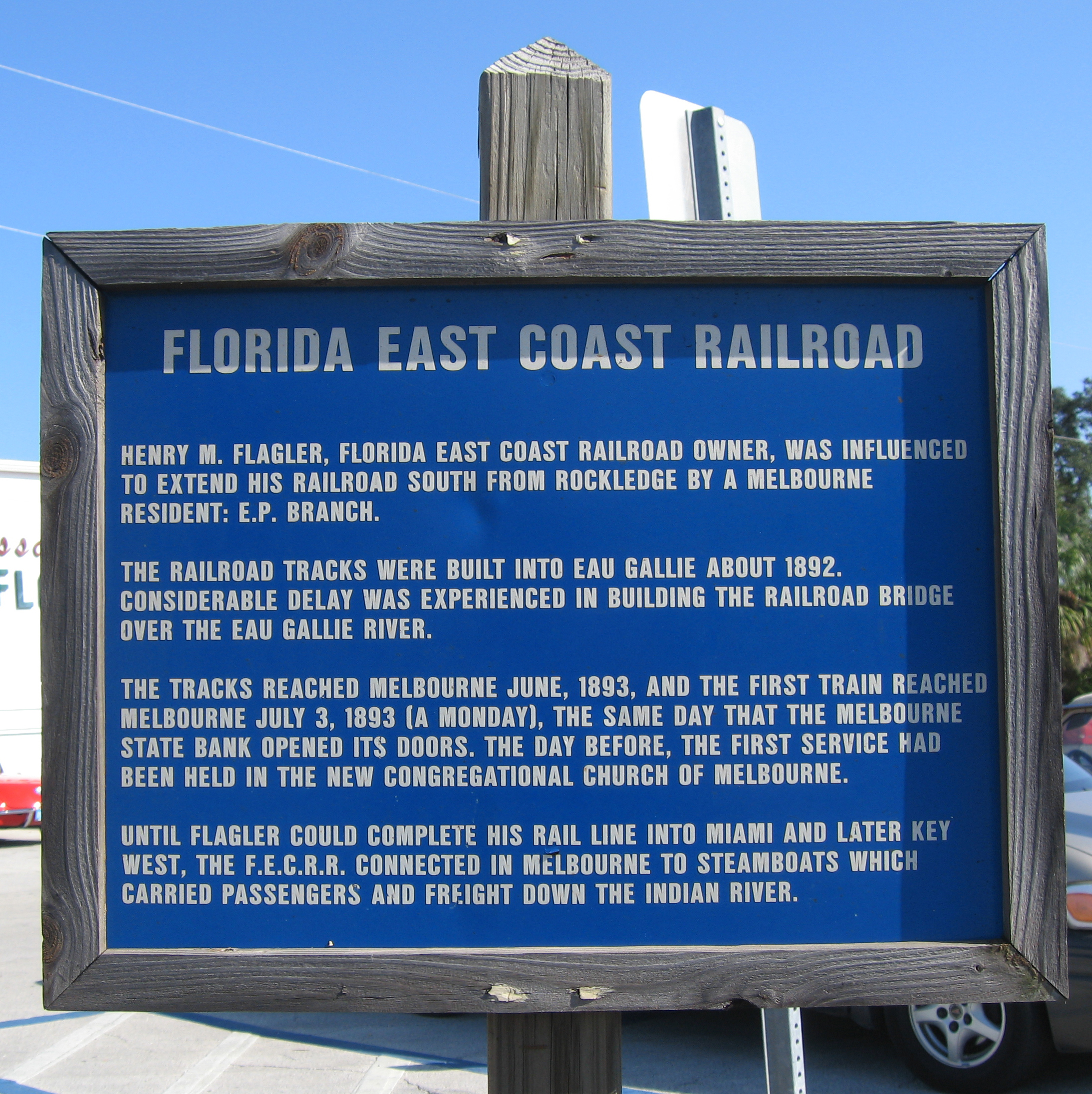
Historical marker (click to enlarge)

The Union Cypress Company Railroad ran east to west through south Melbourne in the early 1900s. The mill town of Hopkins was near the present-day streets of Mill Street and Main Street.

The Florida East Coast Railway (FEC) runs through Melbourne, staying west of U.S. 1 through its entire run. Into the early 1960s, passengers could take one of two Chicago-bound trains (on alternating days), the City of Miami or the South Wind (both via Birmingham) and the New York-bound East Coast Champion, Havana Special, and Miamian from Melbourne's Florida East Coast station. Into the latter 1950s, passengers could take the Dixie Flagler to Chicago via Atlanta from the station. The FEC operated local passenger service between Jacksonville and the Miami area until July 31, 1968.

The Brightline passenger rail company is considering service to extend north from West Palm Beach to the Space Coast, but so far, has passed over Melbourne for Cocoa.

==== Bus ====
- Space Coast Area Transit operates a public bus service in Melbourne and vicinity. The city subsidizes two routes internal to the city so Melbourne residents ride for free.
- Greyhound Bus Lines has a bus station in Melbourne

==== Airport ====
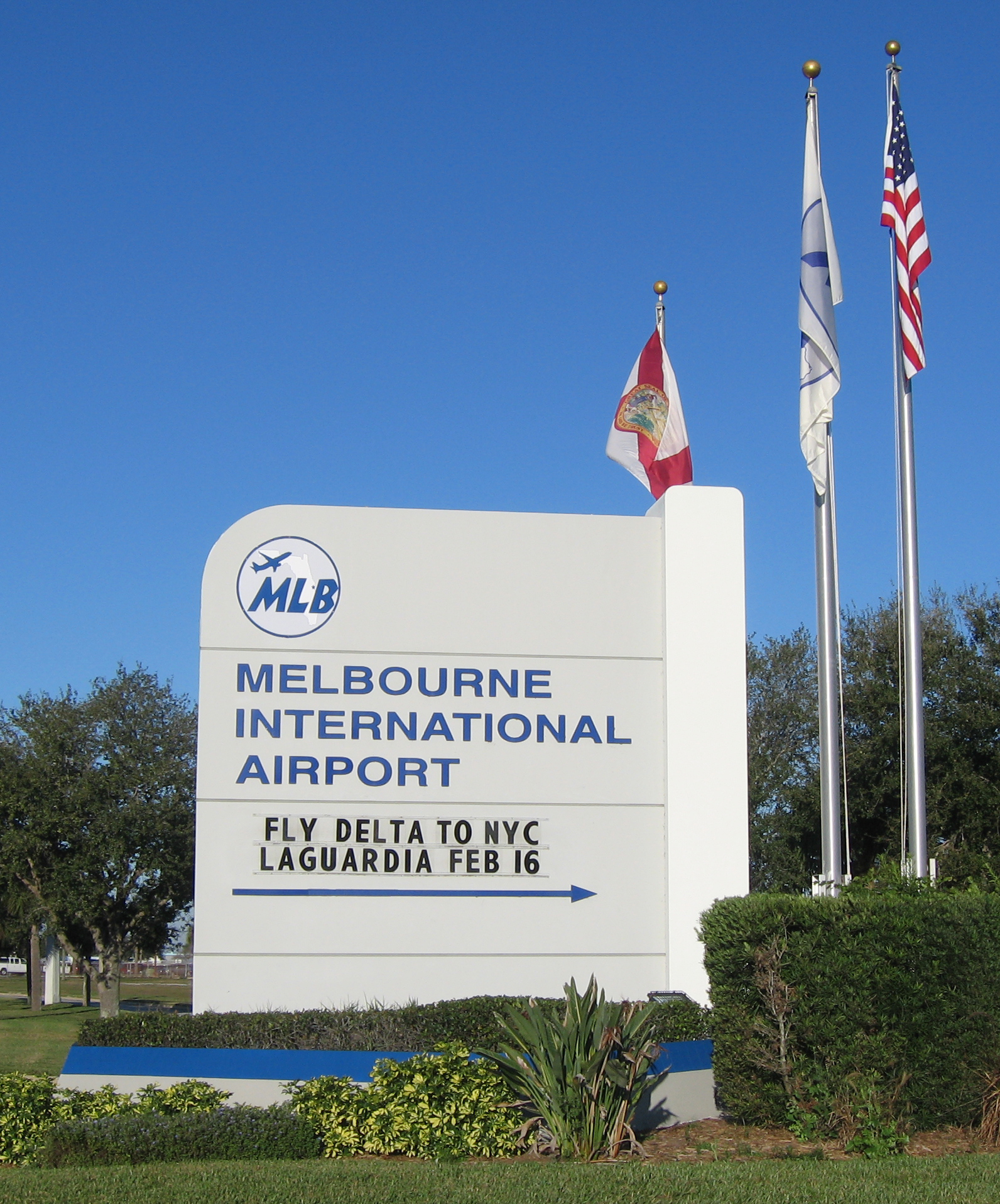
Entrance of Melbourne International Airport

Melbourne Orlando International Airport (IATA: MLB, ICAO: KMLB, FAA LID: MLB) is located about 1.5 miles (2.4 km) northwest of the city's original business district. The airport has daily flights on six passenger airlines and a cargo one, including Delta, Delta Connection, American Eagle and Elite Airways.

=== Utilities ===
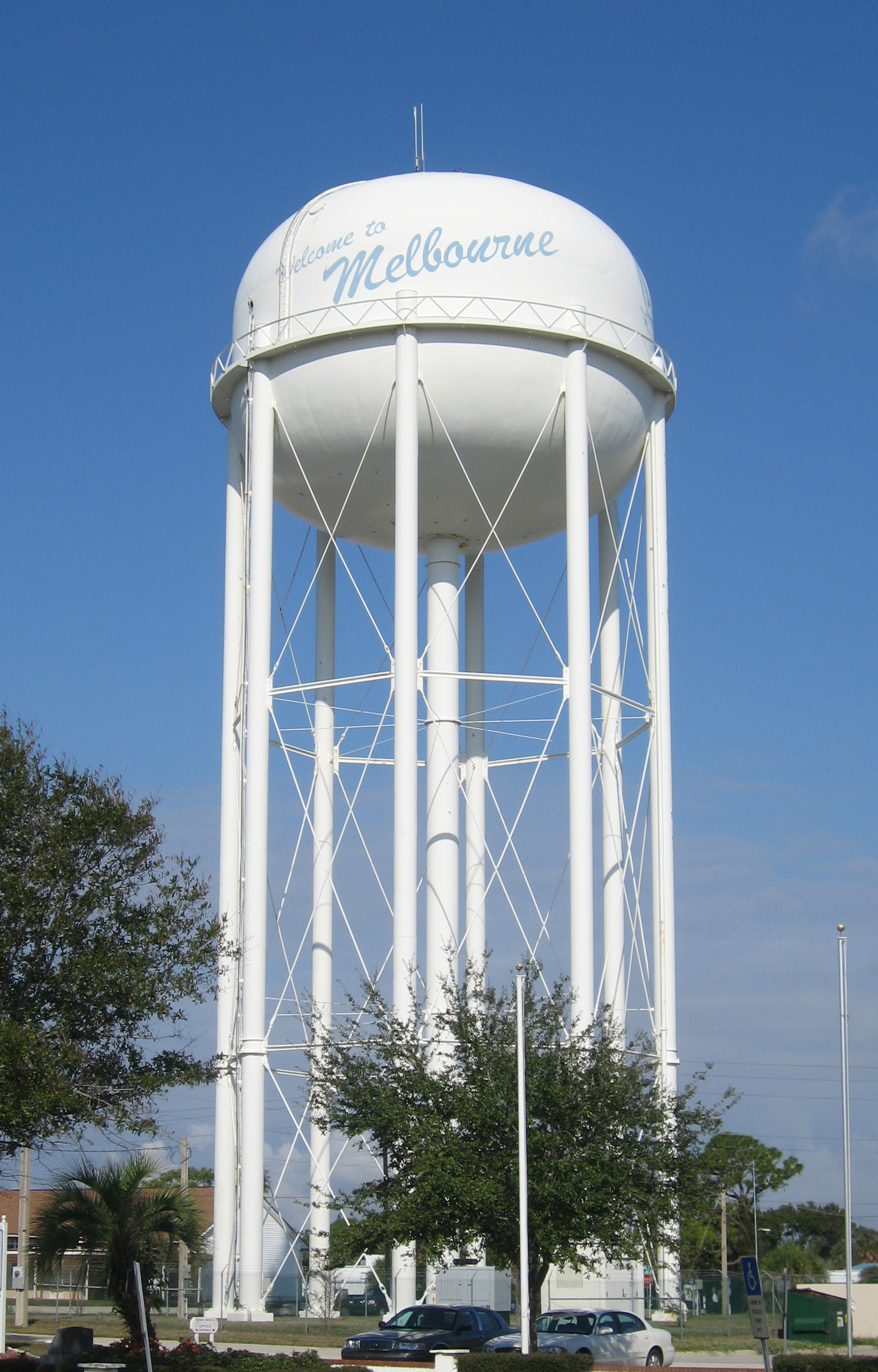
Melbourne Water Tower

Power is provided by Florida Power and Light. Gas is provided by Florida City Gas.

Cable TV service is provided by Spectrum.

Traditional landline telephone service is mainly provided by AT&T, while some cable customers use Spectrum digital telephone (VOIP) service.

Internet service providers in Melbourne range from various 56 kbit/s providers, AT&T (formerly BellSouth) FastAccess DSL, and Spectrum cable internet. Fiber-optic networks are installed in the city mainly for business purposes and have not been integrated for home use.

The Water Department not only provides water for the city, but for surrounding towns and cities for a premium, including Melbourne Beach, Indialantic, Indian Harbour Beach, Satellite Beach, Palm Shores, Melbourne Village, West Melbourne, and a portion of unincorporated Brevard County south of the Pineda Causeway. In 2020, it served about 170,000 people. Wholesale water service is provided to West Melbourne. The total distribution area is about 100 square miles (259 km^{2}) Two water treatment plants take water from Lake Washington and deep wells, providing 25,000,000 US gallons (95,000,000 litres; 21,000,000 imperial gallons) of drinking water per day. This water is treated with chloramine and ozone. Almost annually, the city is obliged to substitute the stronger free chlorine for the summer months when algae blooms are prevalent. In 2003, water rates were $2.27/1,000 US gallons (3,785 L) sewer $4.47/1,000 US gallons (3,785 L).

Solid waste removal and recycling is provided by Solid Waste Management, part of the city of Melbourne's Environmental Community Outreach (ECO) Division.

== Notable people ==
- Oliver Askew, professional racing driver for Andretti Autosport
- Thomas Barbour, author and naturalist, lived in Eau Gallie as a boy
- Peter Blount, former member of the World Cup Bobsled Team and of the U.S. National Track and Field Team
- Bruce Bochy, manager of the World Champion San Francisco Giants Major League Baseball team
- Justin Bryant, soccer player, coach, and writer
- Robbie Carrico, Season 7 contestant on American Idol
- John R. D. Cleland, U.S. Army major general, lived in Melbourne after retirement
- Bobby Dall, bass player for the band Poison, resides in Melbourne
- Cecil Fielder, professional baseball player
- Prince Fielder, professional baseball player, son of Cecil Fielder, went to Eau Gallie High School
- Jacob Fowler (born 2004), professional ice hockey player.
- William Henry Gleason, founded and lived in Eau Gallie
- Kristin Grubka (born 1992), professional women's soccer player, FSU women's soccer national champion in 2014
- Darrell Hammond, comedian and actor, born and resided in Melbourne from 1955 to 1975
- Kim Hammond, former judge
- C. J. Hobgood, 2001 ASP world champion surfer, born in Melbourne
- Damien Hobgood, professional surfer born in Melbourne
- Devon Hughes, professional wrestler, better known as Brother Devon from Total Nonstop Action Wrestling
- Vicky Hurst (born 1990), professional golfer, graduated from Holy Trinity
- Zora Neale Hurston, author, lived in Eau Gallie in the 1920s and 1950s
- Billy Lane, owner of Choppers, Inc. and builder of custom motorcycles
- Jeff Lett, bass player of Cartel, born in Melbourne
- Jack V. Mackmull, U.S. Army lieutenant general
- Ariana Madix, television personality, actress, author and cast member on Vanderpump Rules
- Marcus Maye (born 1993), professional NFL player for the New York Jets, attended Holy Trinity
- Jim Morrison, lead singer for The Doors, born in Melbourne
- Henry Mucci, U.S. Army colonel who led the Great Raid in World War II to free the Bataan survivors, retired to Melbourne
- Bill Nelson, U.S. senator from Florida, raised in Melbourne and graduated from Melbourne High School in 1960
- Reggie Nelson, safety for NFL's Oakland Raiders
- Jamie Noble, professional wrestler
- Hans von Ohain, one of the first people to develop the jet engine, retired and died in Melbourne
- Stanford Parris, former U.S. congressman from Virginia, was a primary resident of Melbourne after leaving Congress
- Will Perdue, NBA forward and center (Chicago Bulls), sportscaster, born in Melbourne
- Toni Pressley, professional women's soccer player, graduated from West Shore High School in 2008
- Tom Rapp, singer-songwriter, leader of 1960s/1970s band Pearls Before Swine
- Taylor Rowan, American football placekicker
- Melana Scantlin, actress
- Stefanie Scott, teenage actress, stars on the Disney show A.N.T. Farm
- Lee Stange, professional baseball pitcher
- Jason Steele, state representative from 1980 to 1982
- Katie Stengel, soccer player
- The Learning Station, kids' band founded in 1987
- Robbin Thompson, singer-songwriter
- Jacob Toppin (born 2000), basketball forward in the Israeli Basketball Premier League, formerly in the NBA.
- Amber Torrealba, professional skimboarder
- George Trofimoff, former U.S. Army colonel and convicted spy for the Soviet Union, lived in Melbourne from 1994 to 2000
- Kate Upton, model, 2012 Sports Illustrated swimsuit issue cover girl
- Tim Wakefield, baseball pitcher for the (Boston Red Sox), born in Melbourne
- Matt Walters, defensive end for the New York Jets
- Leonard Weaver, National Football League fullback
- Larry Wolfe, Major League Baseball infielder
- Mickey Zofko, National Football League running back
