= Helen Blazes archaeological site =

Archaeological site in Florida, US

The Helen Blazes archaeological site is an archaeological site near Lake Hell 'n Blazes in Brevard County, Florida, United States, which was excavated in the 1950s. Stone artifacts from Paleo-Indians (prior to 8000 BCE), the Archaic period (8000 BCE to 1000 BCE) and later cultures were found at the site. The Paleo-Indian artifacts included numerous Suwannee points. These artifacts as well as the Archaic artifacts included tools made from chert, which is not found locally and had to be imported from at least 100 miles (160 km) away. The Paleo-Indian artifacts were found in the same kind of deposits as were similar artifacts in Melbourne (10 miles (16 km) to the northeast) and Vero Beach (30 miles (48 km) to the south of Melbourne), both of which also yielded human and pleistocene animal fossils.
