= List of United States post offices in Florida =

United States post offices operate under the authority of the United States Post Office Department (1792–1971) or the United States Postal Service (since 1971). Historically, post offices were usually placed in a prominent location and many were architecturally distinctive, including notable buildings featuring Beaux-Arts, Art Deco, and Vernacular architecture. However, modern U.S. post offices were generally designed for functionality rather than architectural style.

Following is a list of United States post offices in Florida. Notable post offices include individual buildings, whether still in service or not, which have architectural, historical, or community-related significance. Many of these are listed on the National Register of Historic Places (NRHP) or state and local historic registers.

Post office	City	Date built	Image	Architect	Notes	Ref.
Cleveland Street Post Office	Clearwater	1933		Theodore H. Skinner, Watt & Sinclair of Florida	(Note: Listed on the National Register of Historic Places.)	
United States Post Office	Daytona Beach			Harry M. Griffin		
Old Eau Gallie Post Office	Eau Gallie	1890s			(Note: Contributing structure to the Eau Gallie Historic District.) (Note: No longer used as a post office.)	
El Jobean Post Office and General Store	El Jobean	1923		unknown		
Evinston Community Store and Post Office	Evinston	1882		unknown		
Old Fort Pierce Post Office	Fort Pierce	1935		Louis A. Simon		
U.S. Post Office, now Hippodrome State Theatre	Gainesville	1911		John Young, James Knox Taylor		
Mandarin Store and Post Office	Jacksonville	1911		William Monson		
Old Post Office and Customshouse	Key West	1891		William Kerr		
U.S. Post Office and Courthouse, now David W. Dyer Federal Building and United States Courthouse	Miami	1931		Paist & Steward		
Old United States Post Office and Courthouse	Miami	1914		Kiehnel and Elliott, Oscar Wenderoth.		
Miami Beach Post Office	Miami Beach	1937		Howard Lovewell Cheney		
Ochopee Post Office	Ochopee			unknown	(Note: Smallest post office in the United States.)	
United States Post Office	Palm Beach	1936– 1937		Louis A. Simon		
United States Customs House and Post Office	Pensacola	1887		M. E. Bell		
Old Perry Post Office	Perry	1935		Louis A. Simon		
United States Post Office	St. Petersburg	1917		George W. Stewart		
United States Post Office–Federal Building	Sarasota	1934		George Albee Freeman, Louis A. Simon		
Seaside Post Office	Seaside	1985		Robert Davis, DPZ Architects		
United States Courthouse Building and Downtown Postal Station	Tampa	1905		James Knox Taylor		
