= Royal Poinciana Way Historic District =

Historic district in Florida, United States

- U.S. National Register of Historic Places
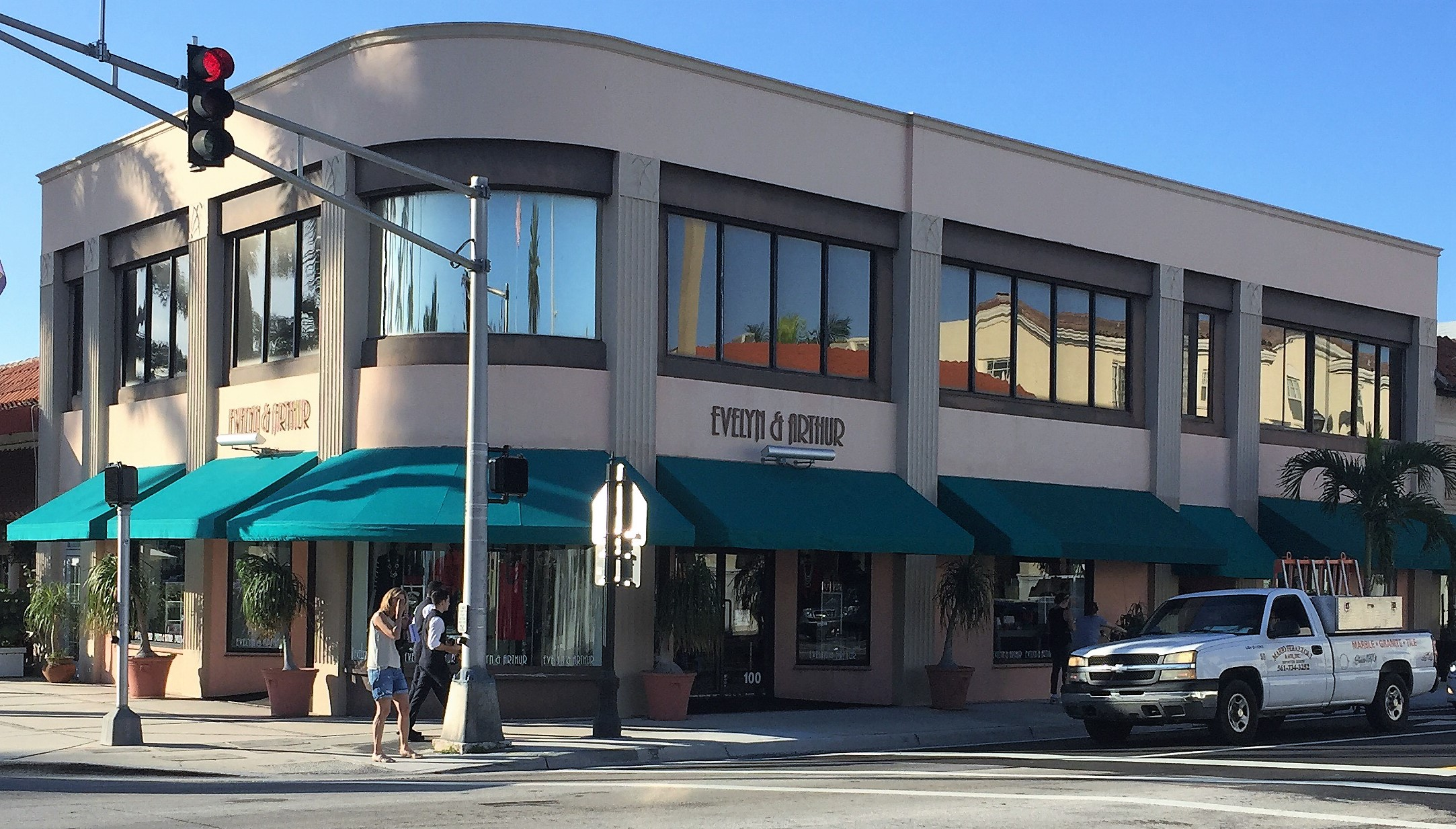
- Royal Poinciana Way Historic District at 100 North County Road

- Location within Florida
- Location: 207-283 Royal Poinciana Way, 95-118 North County Road, and 184-280 Sunset Avenue, Palm Beach, Florida
- Coordinates: 26°43′06″N 80°2′22″W
- Built: 1915-1954
- Architect: Several people (Note: Architects Lucius Draper Babcock, Martin Luther Hampton, Henry Knowles Harding, Julius Jacobs, William Manly King, Bruce P. Kitchell, Gustav A. Maass Jr., David Bradford Scoville, Belford Wren Shoumate, Louis A. Simon, John Stetson, and John L. Volk all contributed to the designs of structures in the Royal Poinciana Way Historic District.)
- Architectural style: Art Moderne, Mediterranean Revival, Mid-Century Modern, Mission Revival, Neoclassical Revival
- NRHP reference No.: 15000588
- Added to NRHP: September 17, 2015

The Royal Poinciana Way Historic District is a historic commerce and residential district in Palm Beach, Florida. The district is bounded by the area from 207 to 283 Royal Poinciana Way, 95-118 North County Road, and 184-280 Sunset Avenue, with some exceptions. There are 36 buildings within the district, 26 of which are considered contributing properties. The Royal Poinciana Way Historic District became a listing in the National Register of Historic Places (NRHP) on September 17, 2015. A post office located at 95 North County Road has also been listed in the NRHP since 1983. Further, the town of Palm Beach considers the post office, Bradley House Hotel, and the Biltmore Apartments as town landmarks.

Formerly known as Main Street, the Royal Poinciana Way Historic District served as the primary location for commerce and civic activity in the early history of Palm Beach. This was because Royal Poinciana Way is the location of where a pedestrian and rail bridge would be constructed in 1901, providing a direct route (and the only bridge to Palm Beach until 1911) for travelers to Henry Flagler's hotels in Palm Beach, The Breakers and the Royal Poinciana Hotel. The contributing structures in the Royal Poinciana Way Historic District were constructed between 1915 and 1954, with 12 architects being involved in the designing and planning of the buildings, including noted architects Martin L. Hampton, William Manly King, and Gustav Maass.

== History ==
Standard Oil magnate Henry Flagler and his workers constructed the Royal Poinciana Hotel in 1894 and The Breakers in 1896, both located just south of where the Royal Poinciana Way Historic District stands today. Flagler's Florida East Coast Railway would reach West Palm Beach in 1894, and by the following year, a rail bridge spanning Lake Worth was completed, allowing tourists more direct access to his hotels in Palm Beach. The first rail bridge was located south of the Royal Poinciana Hotel. However, a second bridge with both train and pedestrian access replaced the original bridge in 1901 and would instead be located north of the Royal Poinciana Hotel. With this new bridge being the only direct route into Palm Beach until 1911, the area around it became the town's main street. Initially, much of the commercial and civic activity in Palm Beach occurred in the Royal Poinciana Way Historic District, while many of the earliest estates in the town were built in that vicinity.

While housing development slowed in Palm Beach during World War I, tourism to the area increased as travelers opted to visit domestic destinations. With additional commerce needed to accommodate the influx of tourists, several buildings were constructed along the main street between 1915 and 1919, which are now the oldest buildings in the Royal Poinciana Way Historic District. The earliest constructed building, now part Via Testa at 221A Royal Poinciana Way, likely served as a jail. Another structure of note built in the 1910s was Campbell Building, constructed in 1918 and located at 277-283 Royal Poinciana Way (the northeast corner of Royal Poinciana Way and Bradley Place). On the first floor of this building was originally Palm Beach's post office, a grocery store, and other retails shops, while the second floor included a dance floor, casino, and a restaurant. The Royal Poinciana Way area remained an important section of Palm Beach in the 1920s and many other structures were built in its vicinity as a result of the Florida land boom. An article in The Palm Beach Post in 1924 described Royal Poinciana Way as "the heart of Palm Beach from which all other activities radiate like veins and arteries, with the post office and bank and the purveyor and the stock broker and the tobacco merchant and the bookshop, all adding their bits to the composite street."

During the Great Depression, the wealthiest in Palm Beach were not adversely affected by the state of the economy. However, many others canceled their winter vacations, which caused a decrease in business activity on Royal Poinciana Way. Later in the 1930s, the street finally transformed into a "gateway" for Palm Beach. In 1937, Main Street became Royal Poinciana Way. That same year, as part of a Public Works Administration (PWA) project, the street was widened and a median added. The landscape median included a row on royal palm trees on the north and south sides of the medians, while shrubs were planted throughout the center. On July 1, 1938, construction workers completed the Flagler Memorial Bridge, also a PWA project. This bridge replaced the old rail and pedestrian bridge from 1901 and allowed direct vehicular access to Royal Poinciana Way. Prior to then, only the Royal Park Bridge had allowed automobile traffic (since 1911). Palm Beach mayor James M. Owens served as master of ceremonies for opening of the bridge, while U.S. senator Charles O. Andrews and former U.S. senator Scott Loftin also gave speeches during the ceremony.

After World War II, tourism and development rebounded. Following the death of Colonel Edward R. Bradley in 1946, Bradley's Beach Club and Casino, a gambling facility and restaurant, was demolished in accordance with his legal will. Land from the former site of the club, located along the Intracoastal Waterway between Royal Poinciana Way and the Biltmore Hotel, was donated to the town of Palm Beach. Bradley Park was then established on the property. In the early 1950s, builders demolished many of the original cottages and instead constructed multi-family apartments and condominiums in their place. The decade also saw the addition of second floors to several structures. The newest contributing structure to the Royal Poinciana Way Historic District is a building at 244 Sunset Avenue, erected in 1952 and completed in 1954.

On September 17, 2015, the Royal Poinciana Way Historic District was listed in the National Register of Historic Places.

== Structures ==
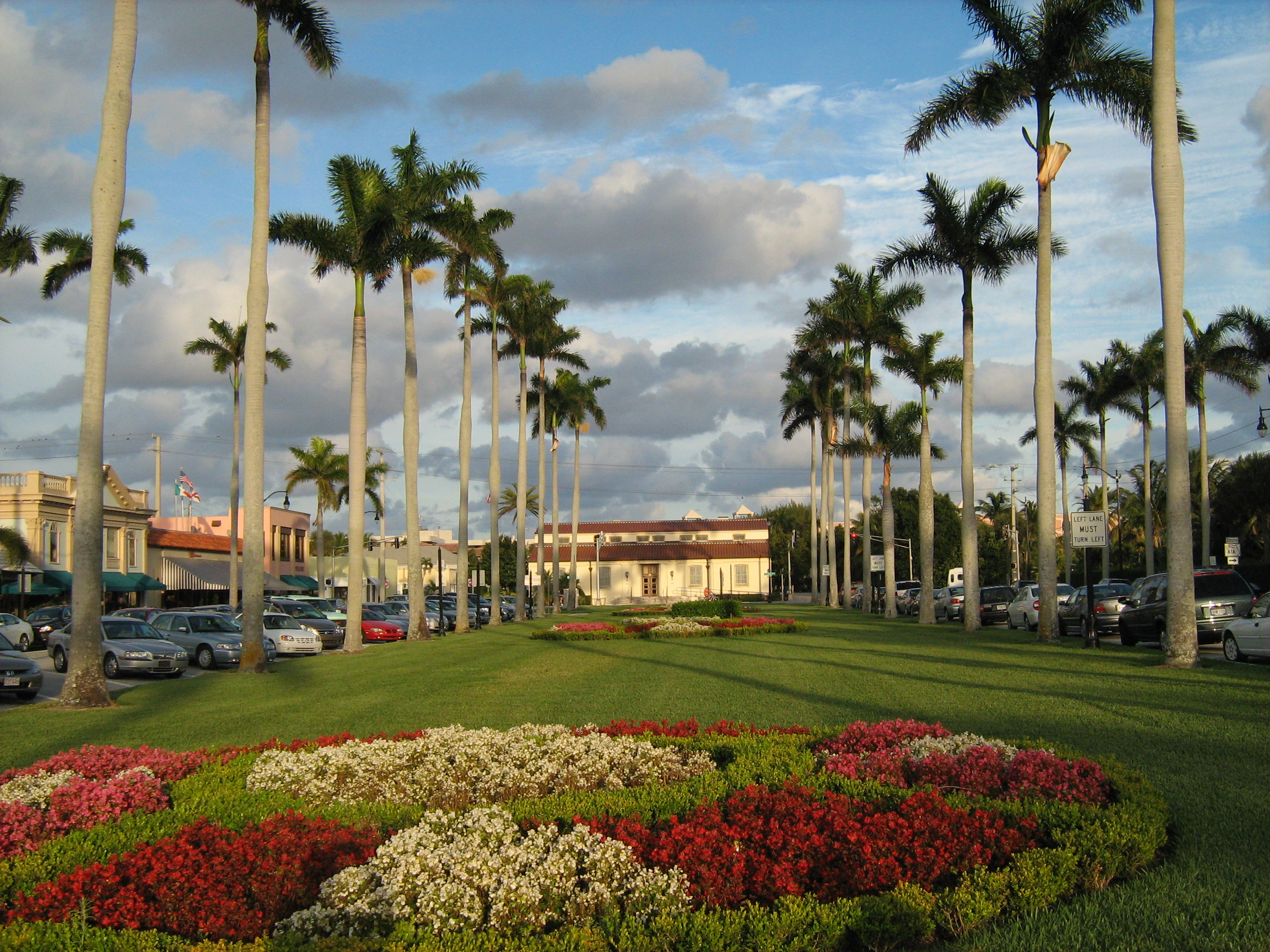
Eastward view along the landscaped median of Royal Poinciana Way toward the historic United States Post Office

Within the Royal Poinciana Way Historic District, there are a total of 36 structures, 26 of which are considered contributing, while 10 others are considered noncontributing as they were either constructed after 1954 or were altered significantly. The following structures are listed as contributing:

North County Road

- United States Post Office at 95 North County Road. A Mediterranean Revival-style structure designed by Louis A. Simon and completed in 1937. The post office building has been listed as an individual entry in the National Register of Historic Places since July 21, 1983.
- The Exchange Building at 100 North County Road. Initially designed by architect Bruce Kitchell in 1924, the Exchange Building was originally a two-story Mediterranean Revival architectural-type structure and had an arcade on the first floor. However, John Volk significantly redesigned the building in 1941, transforming its architectural style to Art Moderne.
- Building at 101 North County Road. Also an Art Moderne-style structure, this building was designed by Gustav Maass and erected in 1936.
- Building at 105 North County Road. A Mediterranean Revival building constructed in 1925. In the late 1920s, the tenants of the building included a gift shop and offices for Kitchell, the Chalker & Lund general contractors, a real estate agency, and a stockbroker.
- Building at 106 North County Road. A one-story Masonry Vernacular-type structure designed by Volk and built in 1941.

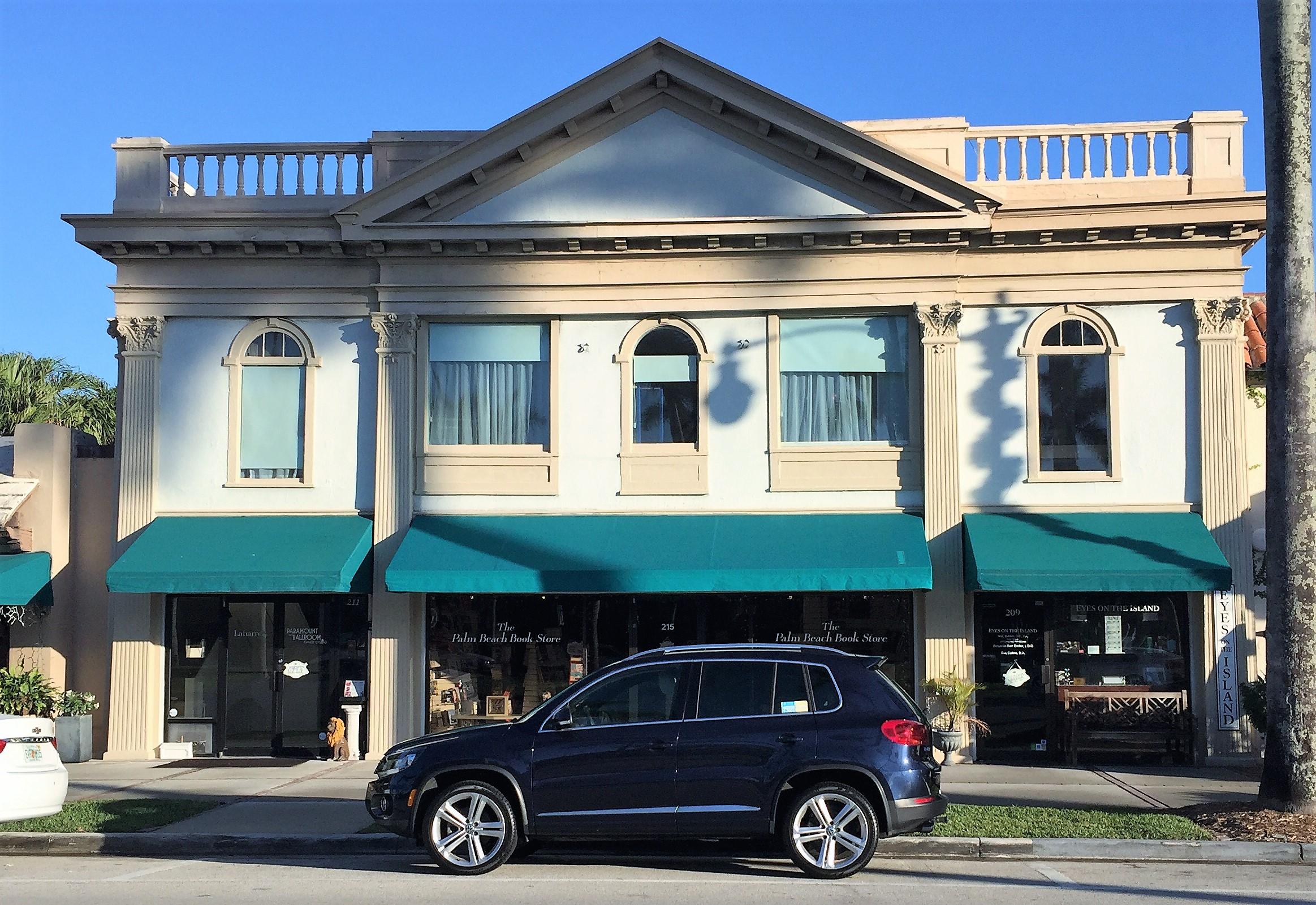
209-215 Royal Poinciana Way, which originally housed the Garden Theater

- Building at 108-110 North County Road. A two-story Masonry Vernacular-type commercial building, also designed by Volk and erected in 1941.
- The buildings are 112, 114, and 118 North County Road are each one-story commercial buildings, designed by Volk and constructed in 1941.

Royal Poinciana Way

- Building at 207 Royal Poinciana Way. A Mediterranean Revival-style building designed by William Manly King. The building has primarily housed restaurants since its construction in 1927.
- Building at 211 Royal Poinciana Way. A portion of the Neoclassical Revival building located at 209-215 Royal Poinciana Way, constructed in 1921. The building originally housed an 800-seat movie theater, known as the Garden Theater. On its opening day, December 3, 1921, the theater screened The Affairs of Anatol, a silent film directed by Cecil B. DeMille and starring Wallace Reid and Gloria Swanson.
- Testa's Restaurant, located at 221 Royal Poinciana Way. A two-floor Masonry Vernacular building designed by Lucius Draper Babcock and constructed in 1947. The building housed Testa's Restaurant. In October 2017, the building, along with Via Testa, were demolished.
- Via Testa, two buildings at 221-A and 221-B Royal Poinciana Way. The former, a one-story commercial structure of Frame Vernacular architectural type building erected around 1915, originally served as the town jail. The building at 221-B Royal Poinciana Way was a small Masonry Vernacular structure built in 1925. A courtyard existed between 221-A and 221-B. A Mediterranean Revival style archway to the courtyard was erected in 1986. Via Testa, along with Testa's Restaurant, were demolished in October 2017.

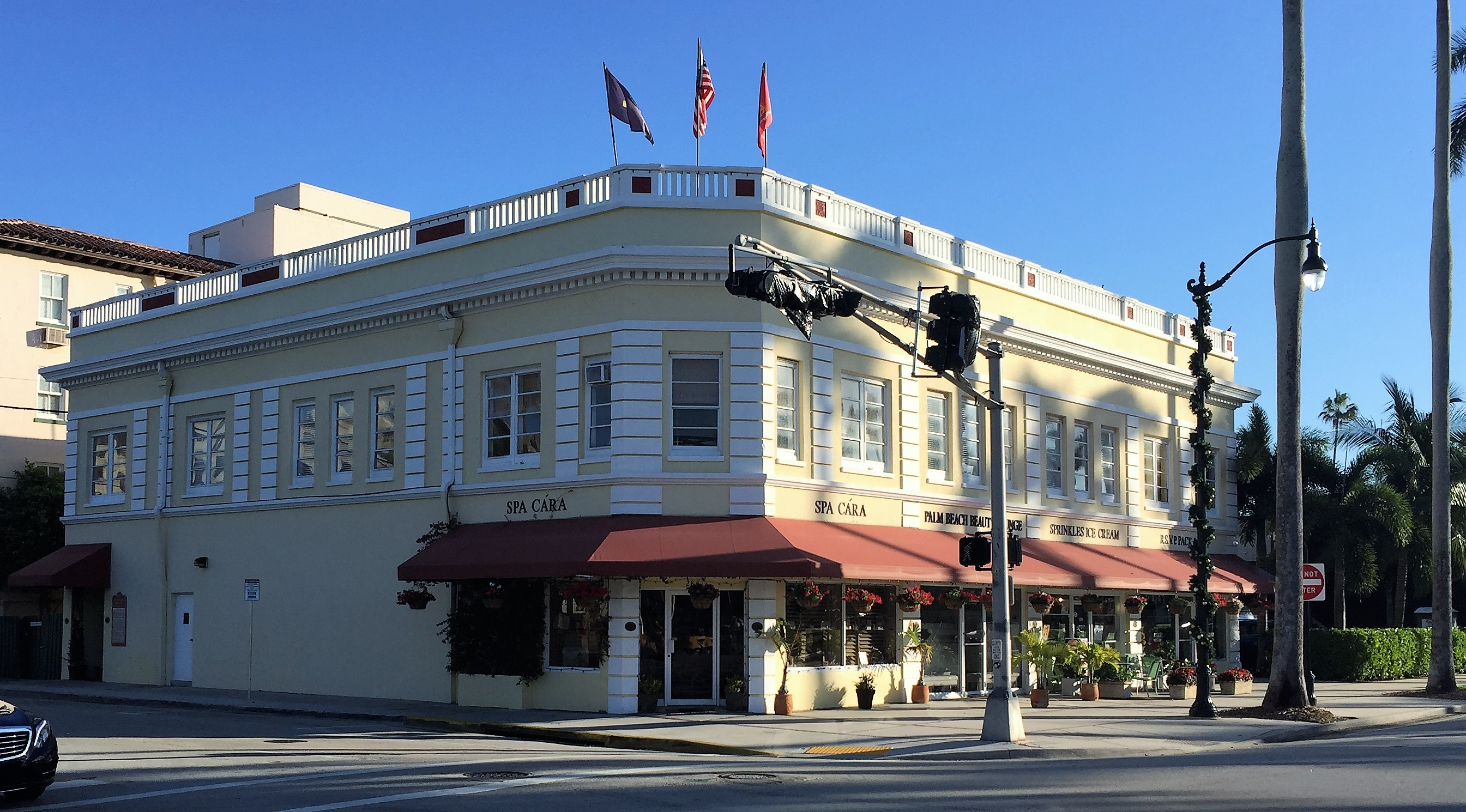
The Campbell Building at 277-283 Royal Poinciana Way

- Building at 233-235 Royal Poinciana Way. A two-story commercial and residential, Masonry Vernacular structure designed by Maass and constructed in 1945. Originally, the ground floor housed two storefronts, while the upper floor had eight apartment units.
- Building at 249 Royal Poinciana Way. A single floor Masonry Vernacular commercial building planned by architect John Pearson and erected in 1949.
- Building at 251 Royal Poinciana Way. This building, constructed around 1923, is a one floor Masonry Vernacular commercial structure.
- Building at 253 Royal Poinciana Way. A two-story Masonry Vernacular building of commercial use, built in 1921.
- Campbell Building at 277-283 Royal Poinciana Way. Named after S. Ross Campbell, who commissioned its construction, this Neoclassical Revival style building was completed around 1918. Originally, the first floor of this building housed Palm Beach's post office, a grocery store, and other retails shops, while the second floor included a dance floor, casino, and a restaurant.

Sunset Avenue

- The Biltmore Apartments, also known as Mizner Court, at 184 Sunset Avenue. Designed by Kitchell in 1924, the three-floor Mediterranean Revival style building is used for both commercial and residential purposes, with stores located on the ground floor and apartment units on the second and third floors.

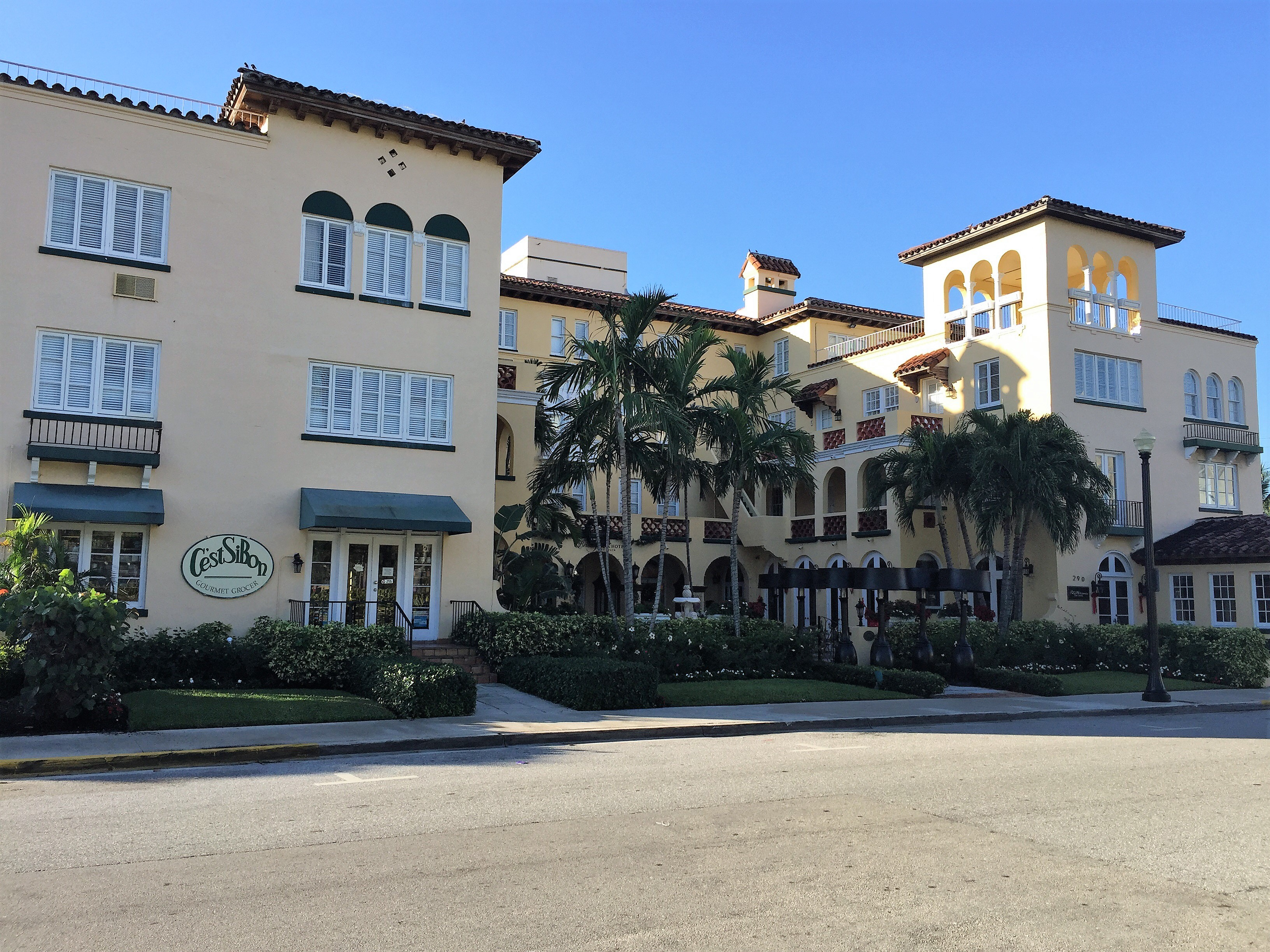
Historic building at 280 Sunset Avenue

- Buildings at 214 and 214A Sunset Avenue, previously under various names including the Clinton Hotel, Orange Blossom Hotel, St. Charles Hotel, and Testa's Hotel. The structure at 214 Sunset Avenue was a two-story Mission Revival style building constructed in 1920. Architect Julius Jacobs designed 214A Sunset Avenue in 1932, a dining room annex for 214 Sunset Avenue. Jacobs then combined the two buildings. As part of Via Testa, 214 and 214A Sunset Avenue were both demolished in October 2017.
- Building at 244 Sunset Avenue. This two-floor Mid-Century Modern apartment building was constructed from 1952 to 1954. John Stetson designed the first floor, completed in 1952, while David B. Scoville designed the second floor, which was built in 1953 and 1954. This was the last contributing building to be constructed.
- Buildings at 262 and 262A Sunset Avenue. The structure at 262 Sunset Avenue is a two-story American Foursquare building, constructed in 1920. Five years later, a garage, now an accessory building, is designed as 262A Sunset Avenue and is considered a contributing structure.
- Building at 280 Sunset Avenue, previously the Bradley House Hotel and originally the Rosa May Apartments. A four-story Mediterranean Revival building designed by Martin L. Hampton and built in 1924 just east of Bradley's Beach Club and Casino. The building underwent a restoration and renovation in 2019 and 2020, reopening as the White Elephant Palm Beach hotel in 2020.

== See also ==
- National Register of Historic Places listings in Palm Beach County, Florida
- Worth Avenue - another notable commerce district in Palm Beach
- West Palm Beach Fishing Club - a historic building near the west side of the Flagler Memorial Bridge
