= Palladium Theatre =

Palladium Theatre or Palladium Theater may refer to:

- Palladium (New York City), a ballroom on 14th Street
- Palladium Times Square, New York City, a live event venue on 44th Street
- Palladium Theatre (St. Petersburg, Florida)
- Worcester Palladium
- London Palladium, a 2,286 seat West End theatre located off Oxford Street in the City of Westminster
- The Hollywood Palladium, a theater located at 6215 Sunset Boulevard in Hollywood, California
