= Brevard County Library System =

Public library system in Brevard County, Florida

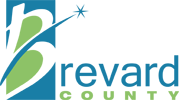
- Brevard County Library System
- Established: 1959
- Branches: 17

Collection
- Size: 1.2 million volumes 112,000 video recordings 61,900 audio recordings

Access and use
- Circulation: 4.6 million items
- Population served: 550,823

Other information
- Budget: $27 million
- Employees: 345
- Website: Official Website

The Brevard County Library System is a public library system in Brevard County, Florida that coordinates activities between its member public libraries, which collectively serve Brevard County. It is composed of 17 distinct branches stemming all the way from Mims to Micco, with the central administrative and largest of these libraries being the Catherine Schweinsberg Rood Central Library in Cocoa, Florida. It is governed by a board of trustees appointed and funded by the Brevard County Board of Commissioners. Its missions statement is "Brevard County Libraries enables people of all ages to improve their quality of life by providing information and enrichment through traditional resources and new technology." Its vision statement is "We will be recognized as a Library System that excels in providing efficient, modern, accessible and customer oriented services."

== History ==
The first library in Brevard County was founded in 1895 in Cocoa, FL. One room was rented for five dollars a month, and women in the community would take turns volunteering to run it. The books and supplies were donated by local citizens. By 1959, four other libraries were established in the county, and Florida Statute 150 gave funding to these libraries in agreement that they would serve all residents. The first five public libraries in the county were Cocoa, Cocoa Beach, Eau Gallie, Melbourne, and one servicing North Brevard in Titusville. With the Space Program boom in the 1960s, Brevard County's population grew, and the five libraries were expanded to nine. By November 1972, it was necessary for voters to approve a tax referendum that would establish a Library Tax District to fund the growing library system's budget. Currently, there are seventeen libraries within the Brevard County Library System.

In 1989, the Central Brevard Library moved to a building contributed by Florida Today. It was the first library in the county to discard the print card catalog and move to an electronic card catalog.

The Merritt Island Library was established in 1965 by a group of residents who formed a "Friends of the Library" group to support the creation and construction of a library. It was first housed in a trailer within a parking lot with books donated through a community book drive. To raise funds, the legislature asked for a tax district, and a referendum was held, leading to the establishment of the Merritt Island Library Tax District. The first tax district board was appointed by Gov. Hayden Burns on December 30, 1965. The library moved to the Civil Defense Building in 1966, which was built with a federal grant of $200,000 in 1969. In 1972, the library was incorporated into the County Library System, and the first contract was signed in 1976. The tax district still owns the building and maintains the grounds. The library circulates over 200,000 items per year, has a collection of around 80,000 items, and provides meeting rooms for over 700 meetings per year. The board oversees a budget of over $100,000 per year, which is used to care for the building and supplement the county budget.

The Franklin T. DeGroodt Public Library was completed in June 1992 and is a 22,300 square foot facility which was built in the western area west of I-95 in Palm Bay. The original Palm Bay Public Library was then renovated and remained open to serve the residents in the northeast area of Palm Bay. With the addition of this second library in Palm Bay the total number of libraries rose to fourteen (14) in the Brevard County Library System.

During a ceremony held on May 26, 2017, the Central Brevard Library, in Cocoa, FL, was officially renamed the Catherine Schweinsberg Rood Central Library, in honor of former Library Services Director Catherine Schweinsberg Rood. Rood worked in the country library system for 32 years, and spent 14 years serving as its director. She is noted for overseeing a number of impactful projects, including the implementation of the first online card catalog system in 1990, as well as the construction of four new libraries. She retired in 2012 and died from a battle with an undisclosed illness in 2016.

== Programs and services ==
Each library has meeting rooms which are available for library programming and community meetings. These rooms are vital to the community, as they offer space for free programs for all patrons.

Youth programs are an important part of each library and a variety of programs are offered, including summer reading programs, story hour programs, STEAM programs. Each library branch has a different set of programs for children ages infant to young adult. Most library branches offer take home crafts that could be picked up curbside.

Adult programs are offered at every library as well, ranging in activities from painting classes, to book clubs, ukulele groups, quilting and yarn crafting groups, chess instructional groups, gardening and sustainable living classes, basic cooking lessons, gaming groups, movie nights, and yoga classes with new ideas forming new groups as the community needs or wants. Basic computer help is also provided at the libraries.

Talking Books/Homebound Services provides library materials to residents with visual and physical impairments and to those with limitations associated with age. A special collection of Talking Books is provided by the National Library for the Blind to serve the visually impaired and physically disabled population. The Talking Books service was originally established by an act of Congress in 1931.

The Talking Books Library of the Brevard County Library System was established in 1988 as the ninth Sub-regional library in the Florida network for the blind and physically handicapped. Funded by the County and in cooperation with the National Library Service of the Library of Congress and the Regional Library in Daytona Beach, the service provides books and magazines on cassette tapes and records, as well as the necessary equipment. Braille is also available to readers from the Regional Library. The service is available to anyone who cannot see conventional print clearly and comfortably for a reasonable length of time or who cannot hold a book, turn pages, or focus due to muscle or nerve deterioration or paralysis. The library offers a variety of titles, including best sellers, Westerns, mysteries, romances, classic novels, juvenile books, biographies, and other non-fiction titles. Patrons also receive a local newsletter with items of interest and/or service.

Homebound patrons are served by a mail service which provides standard library materials to patrons through a mail order catalog. The Books by Mail program of the Brevard County Library System started in November 1983 and is still popular today, mailing over 5,000 books a month. This program is second in the State of Florida with only Orange County besting them.

DVDs and Blu-ray discs are also popular items available for loan.

Downloadable audio books and ebooks are available through Libby and Hoopla Digital.

In addition, the official website for the county system includes an extensive array of free online resources for patron use. This includes access to investment research databases such as Value Line, digital microfilms of the Florida Today newspaper, and access to the complete language learning software, Rosetta Stone.

== Genealogy collections ==
Three of the seventeen library branches within the Brevard County Public Library System have special genealogy collections available to the public for use within the library during regular hours. The Catherine Schweinsberg Rood Central Library in Cocoa, FL has the largest collection. It began in 1989 and contains genealogical records, early Brevard County Courthouse records, and the entirety of a collection of documents originally held by Eastern Florida State College (formerly Brevard Community College). The Titusville Public Library and the Melbourne Public Library also have collections, and are staffed by volunteers.

== Creative Lab ==
Beginning in 2014, the Brevard Library Foundation, a non-profit dedicated to supporting the library system, began fundraising for a Creative Lab. The lab, which is in the Catherine Schweinsberg Rood Central Library in Cocoa, encourages STEM subject education by providing a space and the technology for creative engineering, electronics, music, video, and computer projects. A music recording studio, sound engineering station, and 3D printer is housed in the Creative Lab, and local experts teach classes for residents. Resources include two 3-D printers; Adobe Creative Cloud; maker kits that include littleBits electronic building blocks and Raspberry Pi boards, or small computers often used in do-it-yourself projects; a sewing machine; a workstation for grinding, engraving, sanding and polishing; and a podcasting station where you can “become a blogger, vlogger, or create your own podcast.” The Creative Lab opened to the public in August 2016. Right now, there are two employees working in the Creative Lab. The lab has the same hours as the library and only slightly differs occasionally. Access to the Lab is free of charge, however, there is a charge for the materials used with the 3D printers. The Creative Lab also provides STEM crafts, with the option to take them home. These crafts include light-up flowers and purses, poseable papercraft figures, robots, custom devices, science-based recipes and more.

== Branches ==
Branches include:

- Canaveral Public Library
- Catherine Schweinsberg Rood Central Library
- Cocoa Beach Library
- Dr. Martin Luther King, Jr. Public Library
- Eau Gallie Public Library
- Franklin T. DeGroodt Memorial Library
- Melbourne Beach Public Library
- Melbourne Public Library
- Merritt Island Public Library
- Mims/Scottsmoor Public Library
- Palm Bay Public Library
- Port St. John Public Library
- Satellite Beach Public Library
- South Mainland/Micco Public Library
- Suntree/Viera Public Library
- Titusville Public Library
- West Melbourne Public Library
