= Eau Gallie Public Library =

Public library in Florida, United States

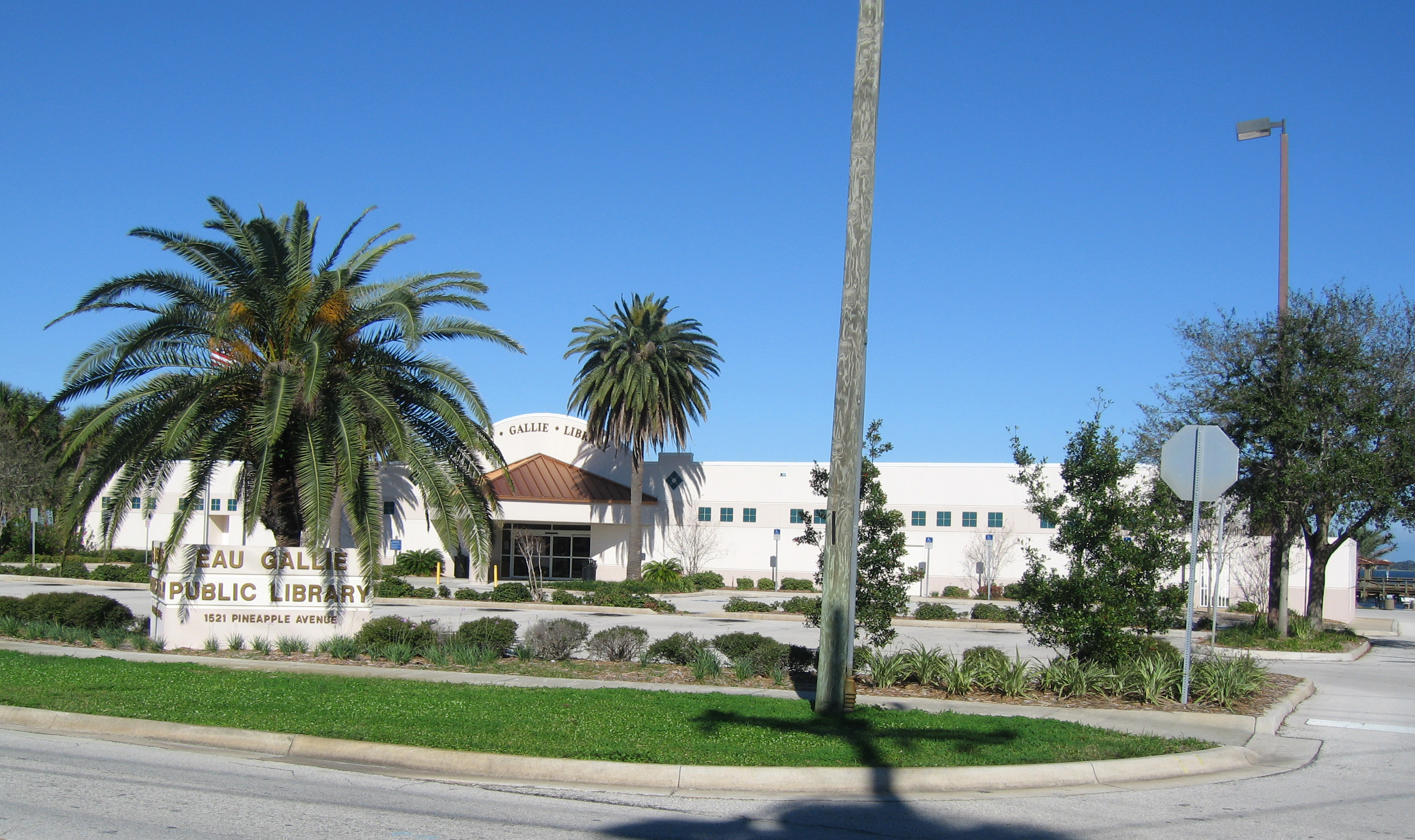
- 28.132136°N 80.626008°W
- Location: 1521 Pineapple Avenue; Eau Gallie, Florida; United States
- Established: 1898

Other information
- Director: Jennifer Morrison
- Website: Eau Gallie Public Library

The Eau Gallie Public Library was founded in 1898, making it the second oldest library in the Brevard County Library System, Florida, United States. The founders initially established the library in the Eau Gallie Post Office. The library was moved to several locations over the years, including the city hall, the civic center and a restaurant In 1962, the library was moved to its current location at 1521 Pineapple Avenue in Eau Gallie, where a new building was constructed in 1998.

== History ==
The history of the Eau Gallie Public Library began with the Eau Gallie Women's Club, whose members began exchanging books and periodicals among themselves in the 1920s and 1930s. The informal exchange went on to become a more formal circulating library in 1939 when some shelves and 22 books were set up in the office of one of the members of the Eau Gallie's Women's Club. The library grew over time in its collection and went through several iterations of locations, from the corner of a public dining hall to the Eau Gallie Women's Club building to a room in Eau Gallie City Hall. In 1954 the Eau Gallie Women's Club came into an agreement with the Brevard County Commissioners where their library would become a free public library and would receive funding from the county. After officially becoming a free public library funded by the county, the Eau Gallie Public Library obtained its own dedicated building which was constructed in 1962 and was subsequently expanded twice. The Eau Gallie Public Library continued to grow in its collections, programming, and community outreach and, In October 1990 the Eau Gallie Public Library had a collection of 67,023 volumes and over 25,000 registered borrowers, a testament to the faith of the founders of the Eau Gallie Woman's Club.

== Notes ==
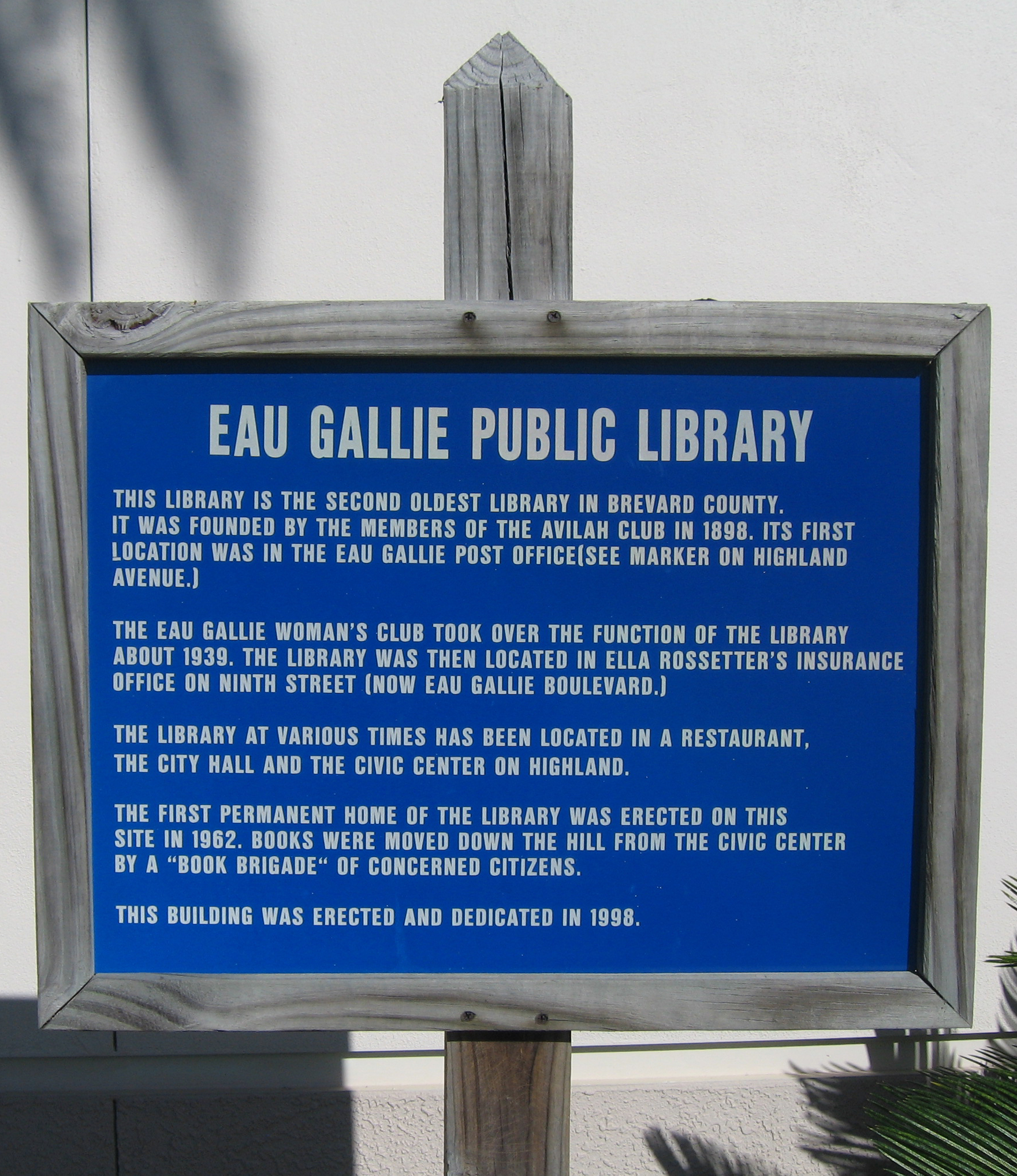
Historical Marker for the Eau Gallie Public Library
