= Howard Lovewell Cheney =

American architect and engineer

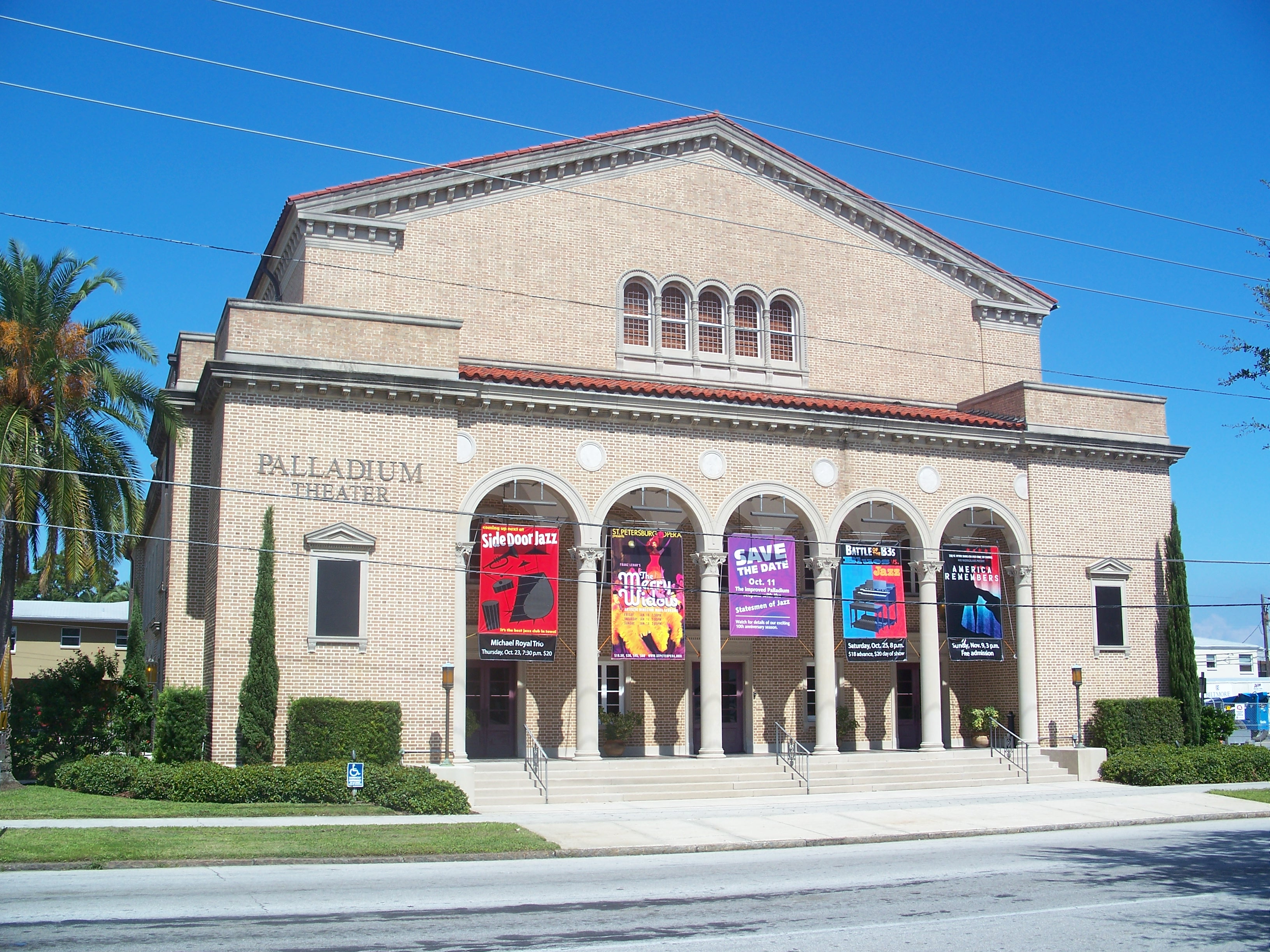
Palladium at St. Petersburg College (formerly the First Church of Christ, Scientist) in St. Petersburg, Florida

Howard Lovewell Cheney FAIA (1889–1969) was an American architect and engineer. He designed Washington National Airport and the Miami Beach Post Office (1937). He was a fellow with the American Institute of Architects.

== Life and career ==
Cheney was born in Chicago, Illinois in 1889. He studied at the Armour Institute of Technology and the University of Illinois. He worked for the Public Buildings Branch of the U.S. Treasury Department from 1934 to 1942; and for the University of Illinois from 1938 to 1940 and again from 1946 to 1948.

He designed the Federal Building (Gary, Indiana) as well as Federal Buildings in Peoria, Illinois and New Orleans. He designed the Federal Building and Court of Peace for the 1939 World's Fair. He designed the First Church of Christ, Scientist at 2410 Fairfield Ave in Fort Wayne Indiana, which was built in 1927, and later converted into the Karpeles Manuscript Library Museum. He designed the original Washington National Airport building and was supervising architect for the construction of the Chicago Tribune Tower in Chicago. He also designed the Palladium at St. Petersburg College.

== Works ==
- F. Edward Hebert Federal Building (1939) on Camp Street in New Orleans. Art Deco architecture
- C.A. Johnson Residence in Highland Park, Illinois
- Federal Building at the New York World's Fair
- Sixteenth Church of Christ, Scientist – a contributing property to the North Shore Historic District in St. Petersburg, Florida
- Unidentified residence with Bernard C. Greengard in Evanston, Illinois
- West Town State Bank in Chicago, Illinois
- Washington National Airport (1940)
- Miami Beach Post Office at 13th Street, north-west corner (1938–39)
- Federal Building and U.S. Courthouse (Peoria, Illinois) (1938), a limestone and granite building in Art Deco architecture / Art Nouveau architecture / Art Moderne architecture. Three stories and 118,000 square-feet. Bas reliefs by Freeman L. Schoolcraft
- Stockyards Post Office on Halsted in Canaryville, Chicago
- U.S. Post Office (Gary, Indiana) (constructed 1936 and abandoned 1970s)

== See also ==
- Charles M. Goodman
