= West Palm Beach Fishing Club =

- U.S. National Register of Historic Places
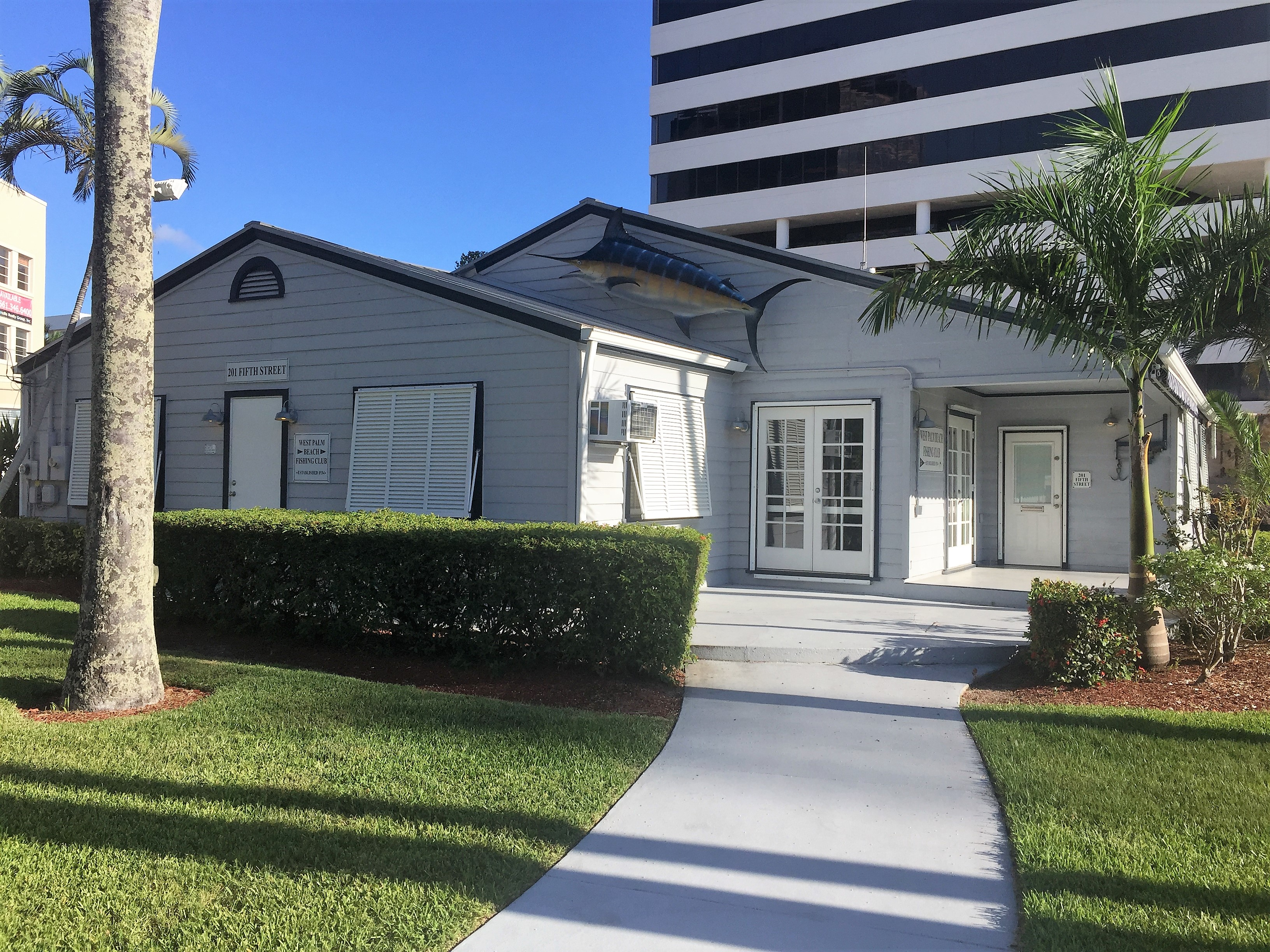
- West Palm Beach Fishing Club building

- Location within Florida
- Location: 201 5th Street, West Palm Beach, Florida
- Coordinates: 26°43′05″N 80°03′03″W
- Built: 1940
- Architectural style: Modern Ranch
- NRHP reference No.: 16000360
- Added to NRHP: June 13, 2016

The West Palm Beach Fishing Club is a historic building in West Palm Beach, Florida, United States. The building is located at 201 5th Street and west of North Flagler Drive and south of North Quadrille Boulevard (State Road A1A), which crosses the Intracoastal Waterway via the Flagler Memorial Bridge just east of West Palm Beach Fishing Club. Since June 13, 2016, the West Palm Beach Fishing Club has been listed in the National Register of Historic Places (NRHP).

Constructed in 1940, the building is of Modern Ranch architectural style and one story in height. The West Palm Beach Fishing Club houses an organization of the same name, which began as a civic and tourism-based organization established in 1934 to revitalize the local economy during the Great Depression.

== Building ==
On October 24, 1921, the Florida East Coast Railway (FEC), formerly owned by Henry Flagler, donated a parcel of land where the West Palm Beach Fishing Club (WPBFC) house currently sits. The FEC specified in the deed that this land be used as office space for the City Recreational Commission (CRC) and a civic organization promoting outdoor sports. Initially, the WPBFC and CRC were both based inside the Hotel Royal Worth (also known as the Pennsylvania Hotel), with the former founded in 1934. Because both organizations quickly outgrew their space at the hotel, the WPBFC began discussions in June 1938 on opening a clubhouse, while raising funds for the building partly with membership dues. Contributions totaled $2,000 by the end of 1939, following a pipe bursting at the Royal Worth Hotel in October that year, which flooded the clubroom with about 4 in (100 mm) of water.

Members of the WPBFC agreed that the clubhouse should be located at the corner of Fifth Street and Flagler Drive, then the northeast corner of Flagler Park and across from the city docks. Local architects submitted renderings for the design of the clubhouse, with Paul E. Koehler's drawing selected. However, plans were revised after a January 1940 letter from the Charles R. Wilson Construction Co. firm estimated that the structure would cost $11,200, which WPBFC leadership considered well beyond affordable. A subsequent quote received in April lowered the cost to just under $6,300. West Palm Beach city officials initially rejected the WPBFC's acquisition to the land, with former City Manager Frank Hannon objecting to part of Flagler Park being used for a clubhouse and city attorney Paul Potter noting that a quitclaim deed would need to be obtained from the FEC first. The FEC responded favorably, granting the deed in September 1940 in exchange for $1.

Construction began in November 1940, and by the end of the following month, WPBFC and CRC employees moved into the offices inside the building. In January 1941, the clubhouse officially opened in a ceremony that included speeches from WPBFC president Henry C. Richardson, CRC secretary Arthur C. Black, and West Palm Beach mayor Ronald V. Ware. The WPBFC clubhouse has been listed as a Palm Beach County Historic Site since 1990 and on the West Palm Beach Register of Historic Places since 1998. Additionally, the WPBFC clubhouse was added to the National Register of Historic Places on June 13, 2016.

=== Structure ===
The clubhouse for the WPBFC is Modern Ranch, one-story wood frame building located at the northwest intersection of North Flagler Drive and Fifth Street. All external windows are covered with metallic Bahama-style shutters, added in 1998. The southside features a lower and upper gable wall, with a taxidermized sailfish mounted on the exterior of the upper gable wall. Two sets of French doors are located at the building's southeast corner, while another unadorned door is positioned on the south wall. A chimney, consisting of stucco finish and bricks, is centered on the north side of the building. Originally, two windows bordered an internal fireplace, but were replaced an air-conditioning units in 1994 after multiple break-in. Some other modifications occurred to comply with building codes revisions after Hurricane Andrew in 1992, including asphalt shingle roof being removed in favor of a metal roof in 1996.

Internally, the ceiling is composed of Dade County pine and metal lath and cypress wood paneling covering the walls. The interior includes a large open space, often used for meetings and assemblies, measuring about 30 by 40 ft (9.1 by 12.2 m). Except along the north wall, which is lined with a fireplace, a television, and several displays, this space is surrounded by offices and other rooms. The conference and a storage room were initially occupied by the CRC. Various locations inside the building have exhibits and taxidermy displays. Parts of the porch, originally measuring 41 ft (12 m) in length, on the eastside of the building was later enclosed, adding some additional interior space.

== Organization ==
Following the 1928 Okeechobee hurricane and the start of the Great Depression in 1929, prominent businessmen discussed efforts to revitalize the local economy. In January 1934, the West Palm Beach city commission established a committee known as the City Recreational Commission, which, among other activities, added a fishing tournament to the annual Sun Dance festival. The contest and the fishing season drew thousands of people and led to the capture of over 1,200 sailfish. On October 9, 1934, 35 sports-fishing enthusiasts in the local area established the West Palm Beach Fishing Club (WPBFC), whose charter was officially recorded on October 29. Originally based at the Hotel Royal Worth (also known as the Pennsylvania Hotel), the WPBFC first congregated there on October 15 and initially held meetings twice per month. Within 30 days of the establishment of the WPBFC, the club consisted of 185 members.

The WPBFC began holding the Silver Sailfish Derby in 1935, the oldest annual billfish tournament, then a three-week contest that attracts participants from across the world. The club attracted additional tourism to the area due to annual winter and summer tournaments. By the end of the 1930s, the WPBFC consisted of approximately 500 dues-paying members and collected about $2,000 for the clubhouse building fund. A conservation committee was formed in 1937 after members noticed that the number of sailfish caught exceeded the amount that could be consumed or mounted. The clubhouse for the WPBFC opened in 1940 at 201 5th Street. World War II brought gasoline rations, United States Coast Guard patrols, and German U-boats just offshore. Consequently, civilian boating activities decreased significantly, including those associated with the WPBFC. In the 1950s, the WPBFC assisted the University of Miami and Woods Hole Oceanographic Institute with developing and expanding their tagging programs.

The club became the first organization to receive approval from the Palm Beach County government to construct an artificial reef in 1960, their first of which consisted of approximately 500 wrecked cars, an abandoned 117 ft (36 m) barge, and miscellaneous junk, including broken appliances. However, the practice of using automobiles to build artificial reefs was later discontinued due to the rapid deterioration of metal and replaced with old ships, rocks, and concrete, 7,000 t (6,900 long tons; 7,700 short tons) of which was obtained from the old Royal Park Bridge. The city government of West Palm Beach initially provided some financial support to the WPBFC, but last did so in 1967. Organization president Johnny Ryovich Jr. convinced the Florida Department of Natural Resources to establish a satellite research laboratory at the WPBFC clubhouse in 1970. Notable former members include professional golfer Sam Snead and Major League Baseball player and manager Ted Williams. Ernest Hemingway also became a club benefactor, sponsoring the trophy called "Old Man and the Sea" for the Silver Sailfish Derby and giving an autographed copy of the novel of the same title to the winner. Additionally, Major Bowes occasionally promoted the Silver Sailfish Derby to his some 22 million listeners, while Otto Christian Archibald von Bismarck caught two gold-button sailfish on one day during the 1936 iteration of the contest. As of 2016, the West Palm Beach Fishing Club organization has almost 1,400 members.

== See also ==
- National Register of Historic Places listings in Palm Beach County, Florida
- Royal Poinciana Way Historic District – A historic district in Palm Beach located at the other end of the Flagler Memorial Bridge
