= Miami Beach Post Office =

Post office in Florida, United States

Coordinates: 25°47′4″N 80°7′57″W

The Miami Beach Post Office is a historic 1937 Art Moderne U.S. Post Office building in Miami Beach, Florida, designed by Howard Lovewell Cheney and built under the patronage of the Works Progress Administration during the Great Depression.

Cheney designed the post office with a tall circular lobby with a cone-shaped roof and a thin tall cupola; a small round fountain directly beneath it and murals by Charles Hardman depicting Ponce de Leon's invasion of Florida on the wall above gold-colored post office boxes.

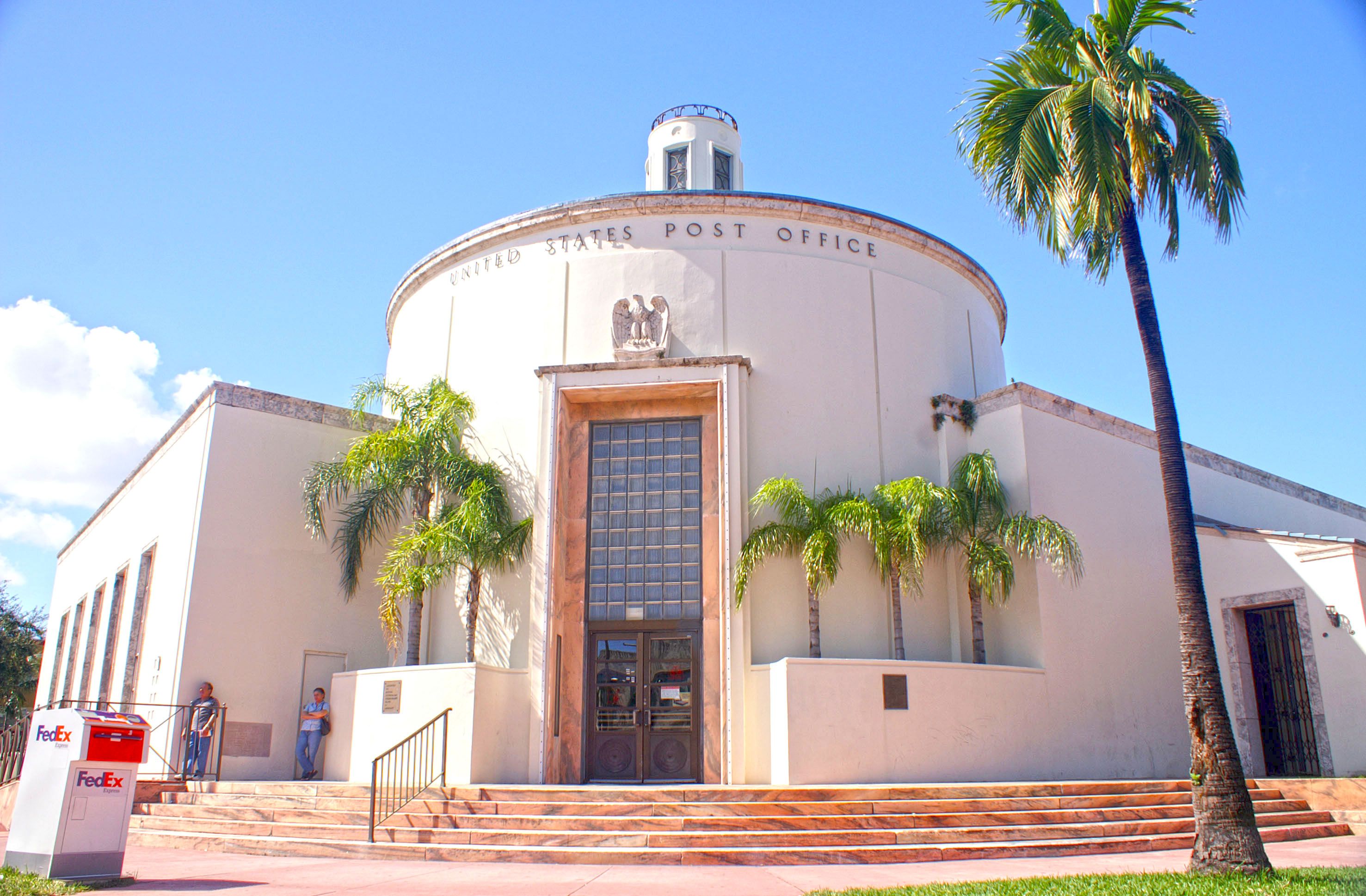
Miami Beach Post Office - Washington Avenue 13th Street South Beach

The building features a noteworthy main entrance with double doors topped by a ten-foot high wall of glass blocks that allow natural light to fill the lobby. Just above the doorway a large stone eagle dominates the entrance. From the main lobby, the post office branches off to the rear service area and the side lobby where customers are received.

Charles Hardman, a native Floridian, was commissioned to paint a mural in 1940 by the Section of Fine Arts of the Works Progress Administration. He created a three-section mural that adorns the lobby wall. The sections are entitled Discovery, which shows Ponce de Leon’s arrival in Florida in 1513; de Soto and the Indians, showing Hernando de Soto and his men engaged in battle with Native Americans in 1539; and Conference, which shows General Thomas Jesup negotiating with Native Americans after the Second Seminole War in 1837. Hardman also painted a mural entitled Indians Receiving Gifts for the post office in Guntersville, Alabama.

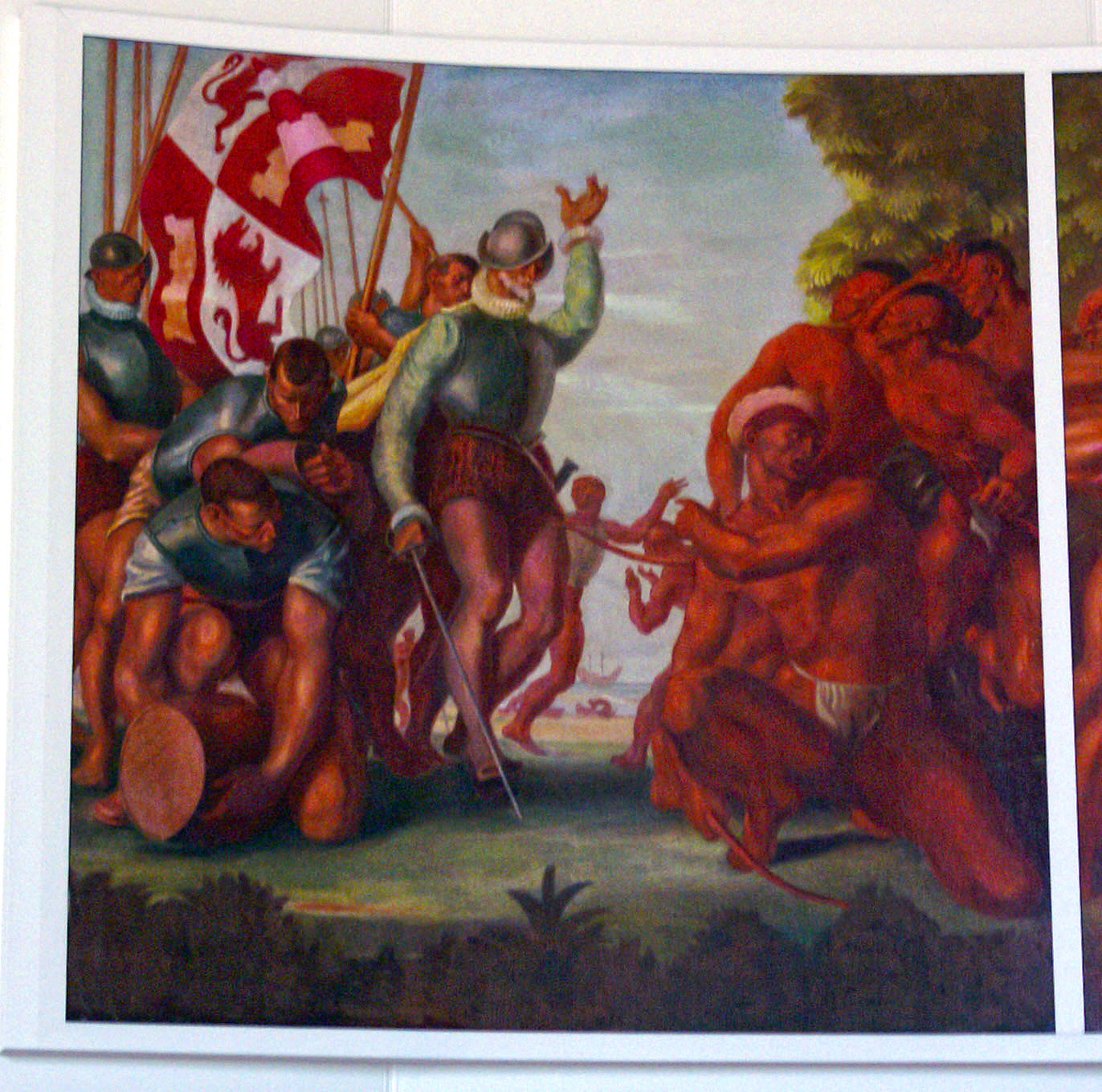
Ponce de Leon arrives in Florida in 1513

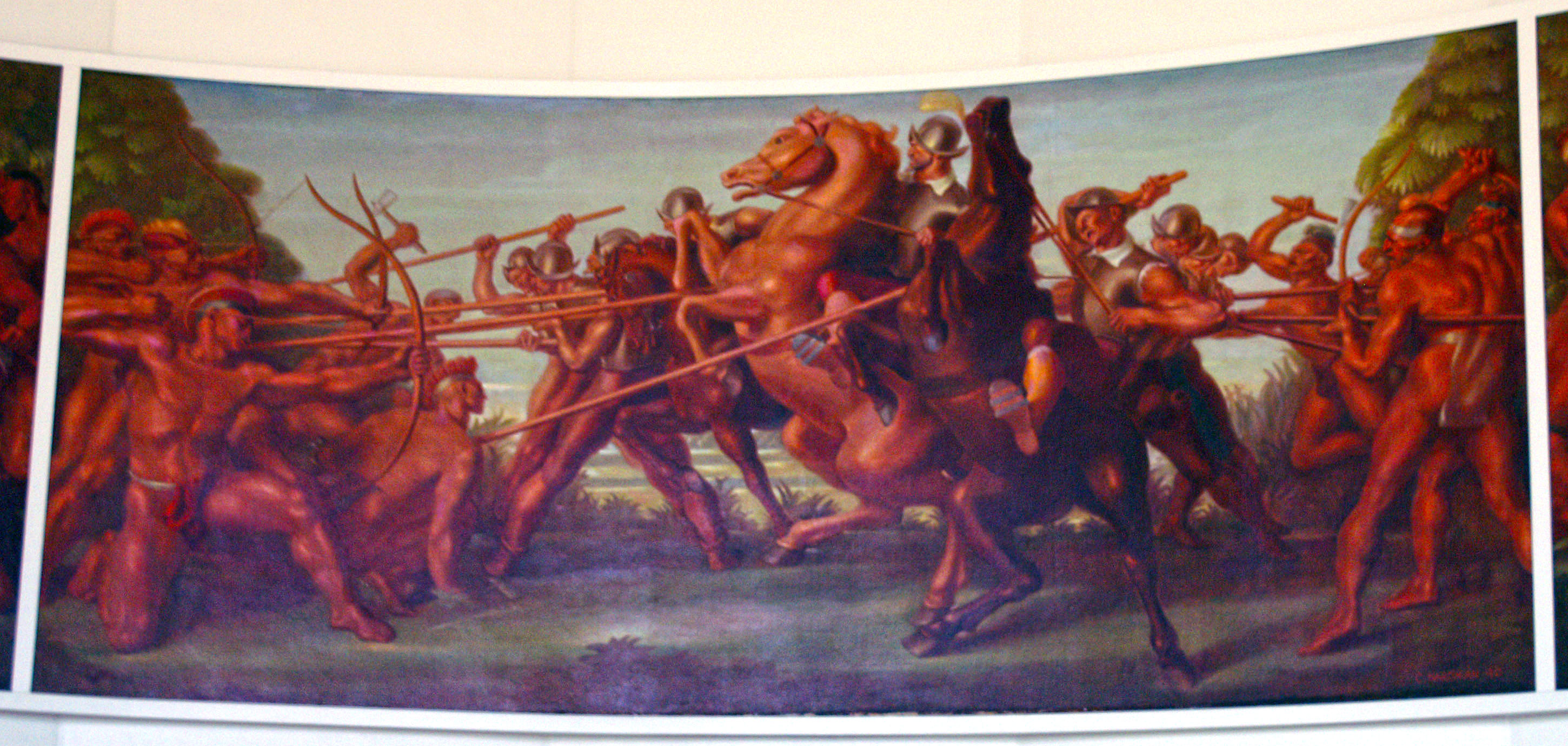
Hernando de Soto and his men fighting with Native Americans in 1539

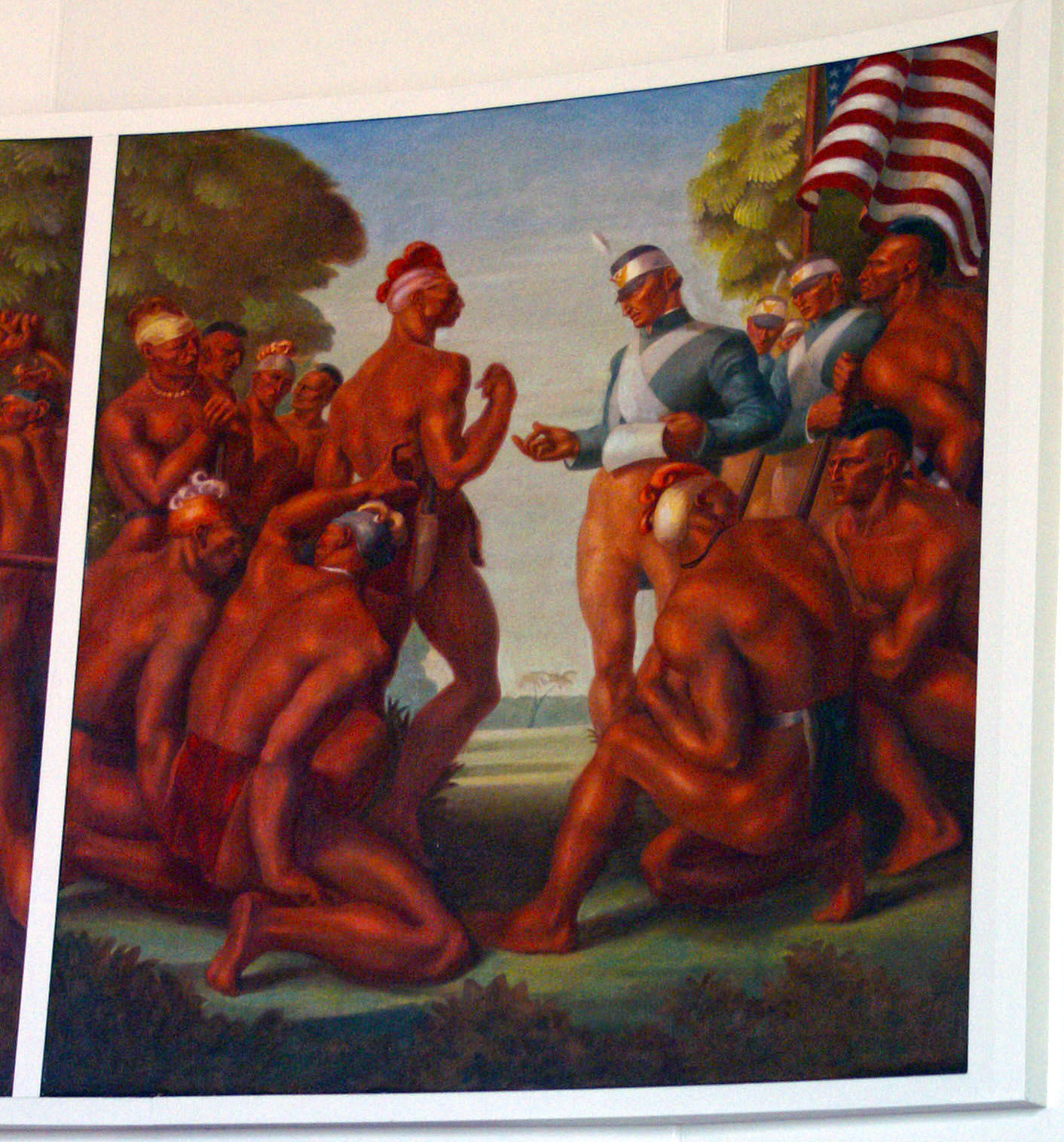
General Thomas Jesup negotiating with Native Americans in 1837

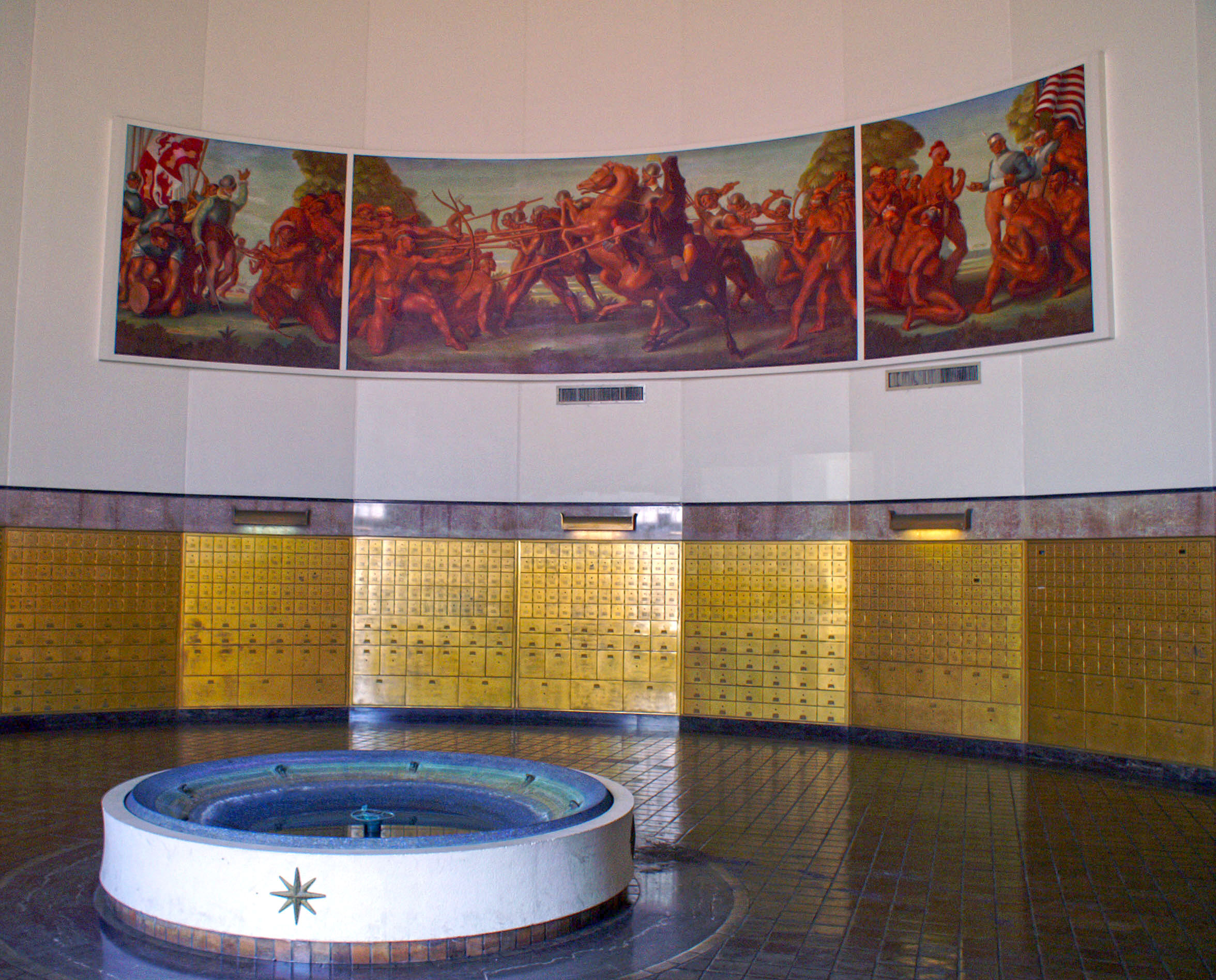
Lobby with murals and gilded post office boxes

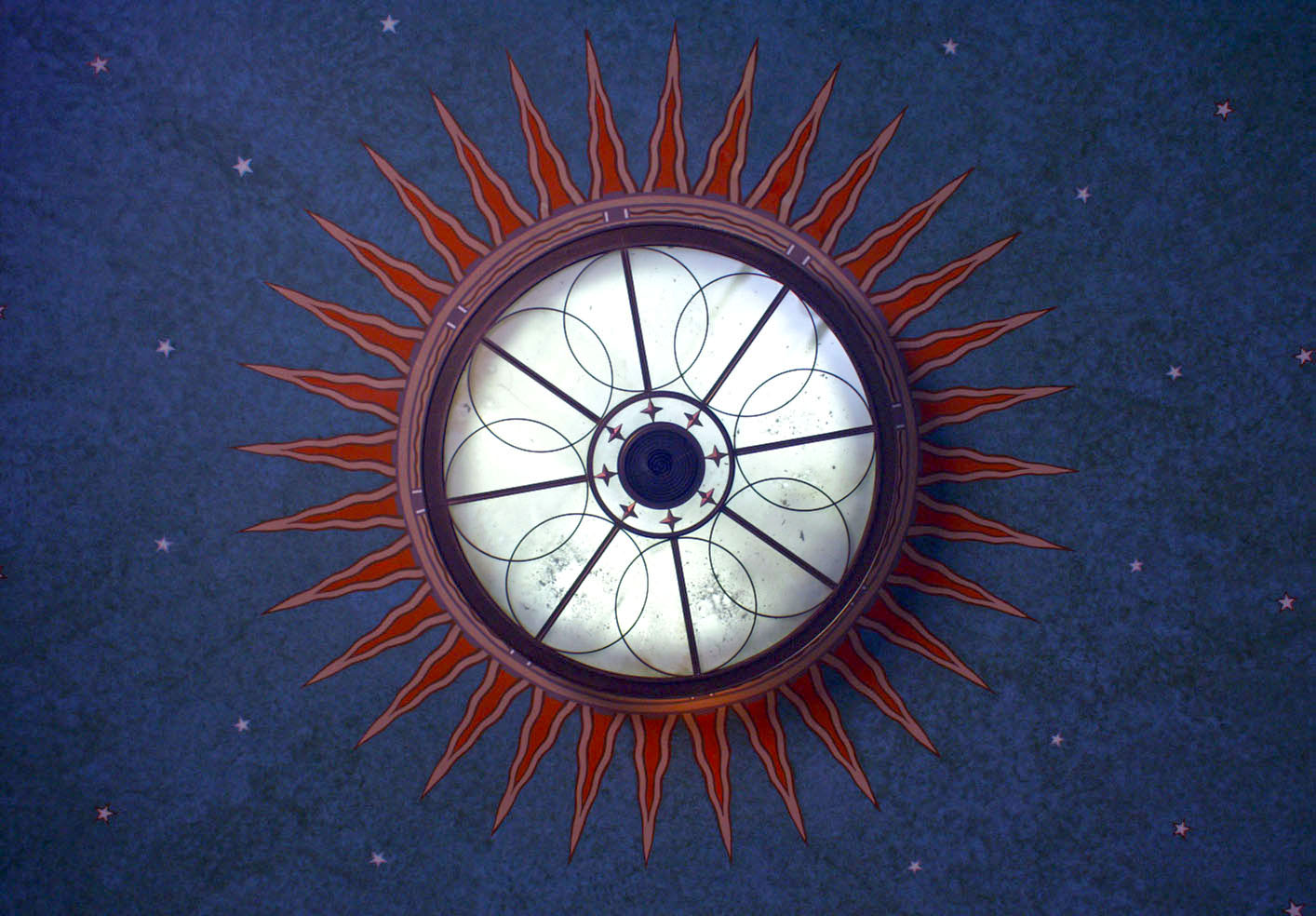
View of cupola above fountain
