= United States Post Office (Daytona Beach, Florida) =

- U.S. Post Office
- U.S. National Register of Historic Places
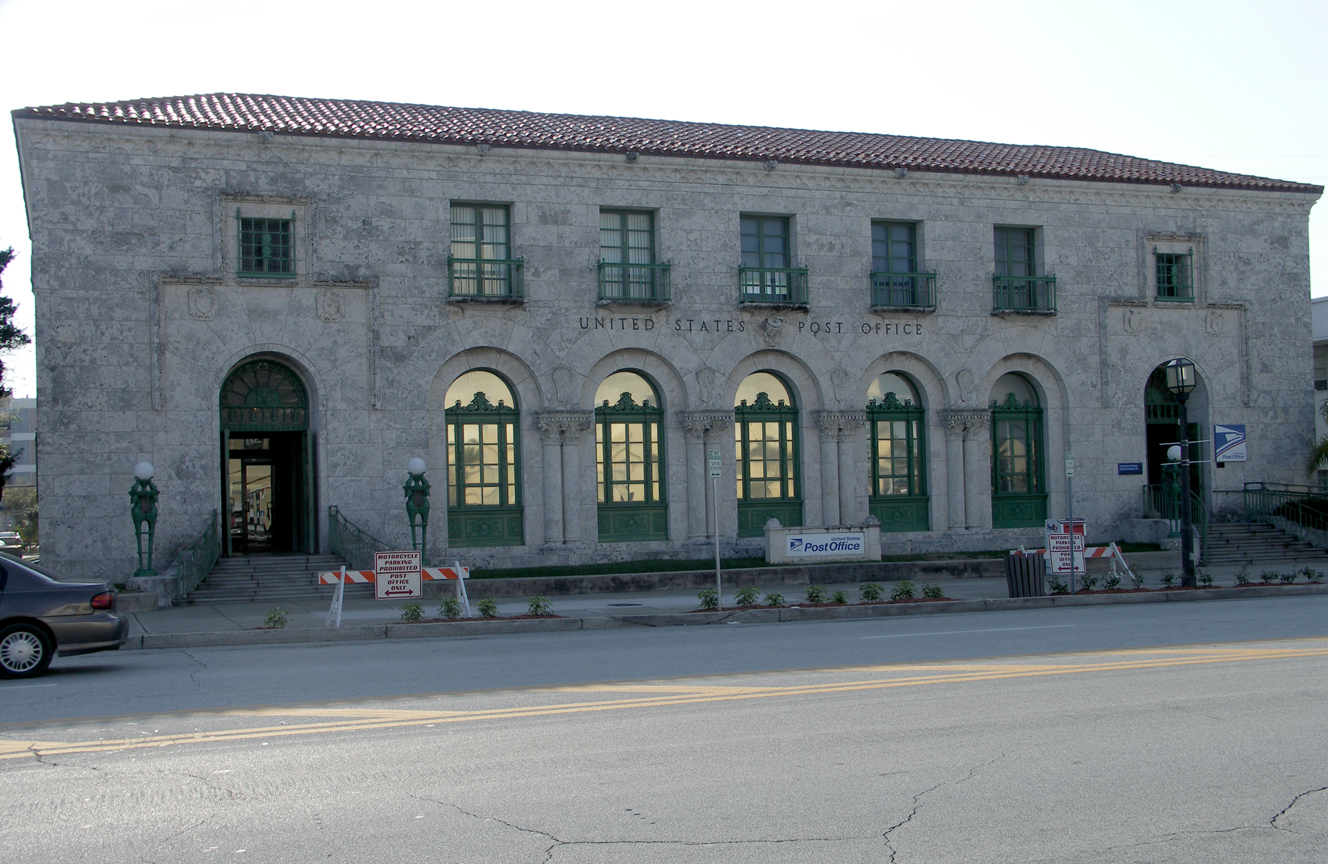

- Location within Volusia County
- Location: 220 N. Beach St., Daytona Beach, Florida
- Coordinates: 29.2146°N 81.0210°W
- NRHP reference No.: 88000974
- Added to NRHP: June 30, 1988

The U.S. Post Office at 220 North Beach Street in Daytona Beach, Florida, United States is a historic building. On June 30, 1988, it was added to the U.S. National Register of Historic Places.

== See also ==
- List of United States post offices
