= United States Post Office (St. Petersburg, Florida) =

- U.S. Post Office
- U.S. National Register of Historic Places
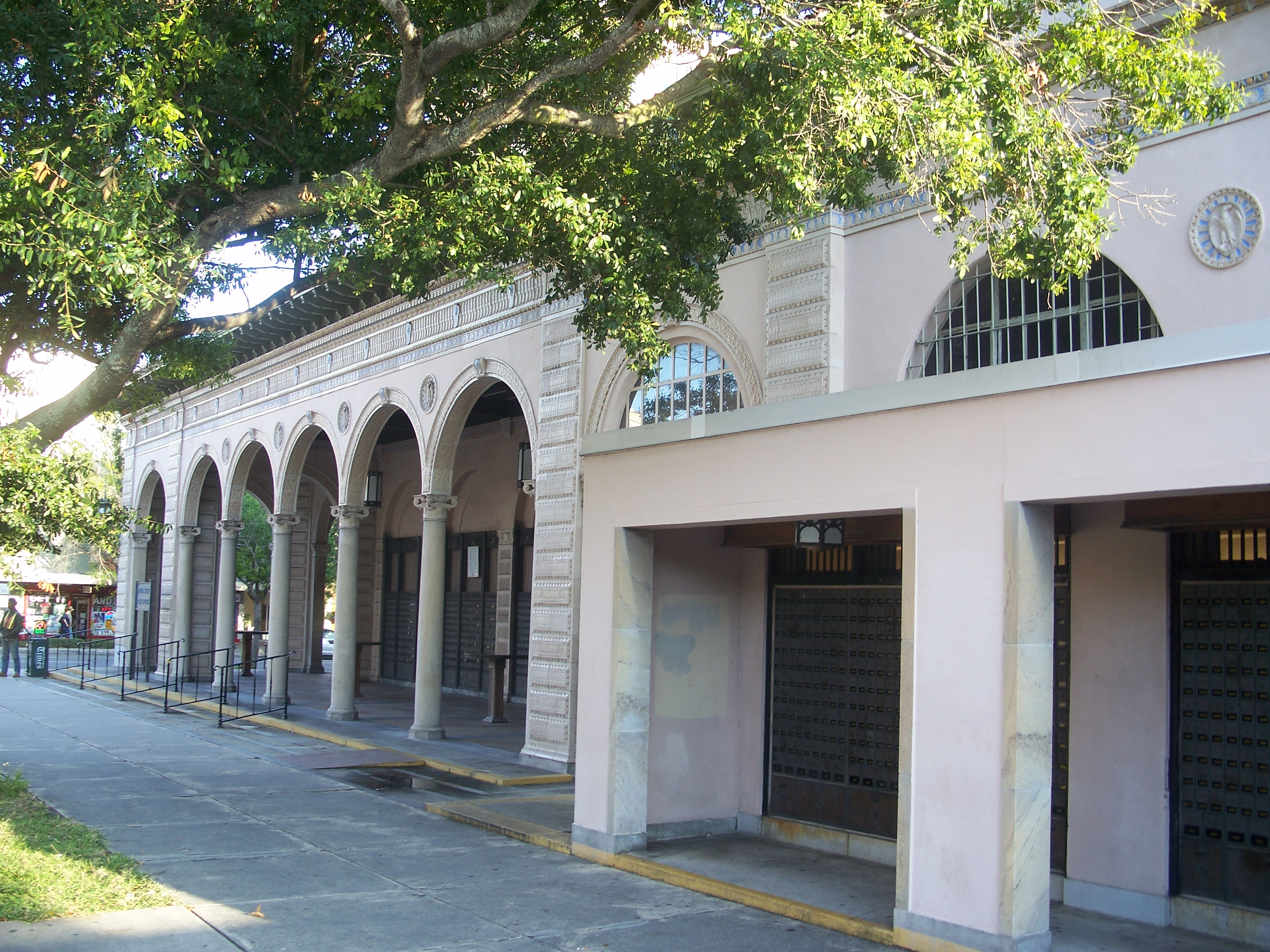

- Location within Florida Location within the United States
- Location: St. Petersburg, Florida
- Coordinates: 27°46′18″N 82°38′20″W
- Built: 1916-1917
- Architect: George W. Stewart
- Architectural style: Classical Revival with Spanish Colonial elements
- NRHP reference No.: 75000564
- Added to NRHP: April 4, 1975

The U.S. Post Office (also known as the Open Air Post Office) at 400 First Avenue North in St. Petersburg, Florida is a historic building. On April 4, 1975, it was added to the U.S. National Register of Historic Places.

== See also ==
- List of United States post offices
