= Mandarin Store and Post Office =

- U.S. National Register of Historic Places
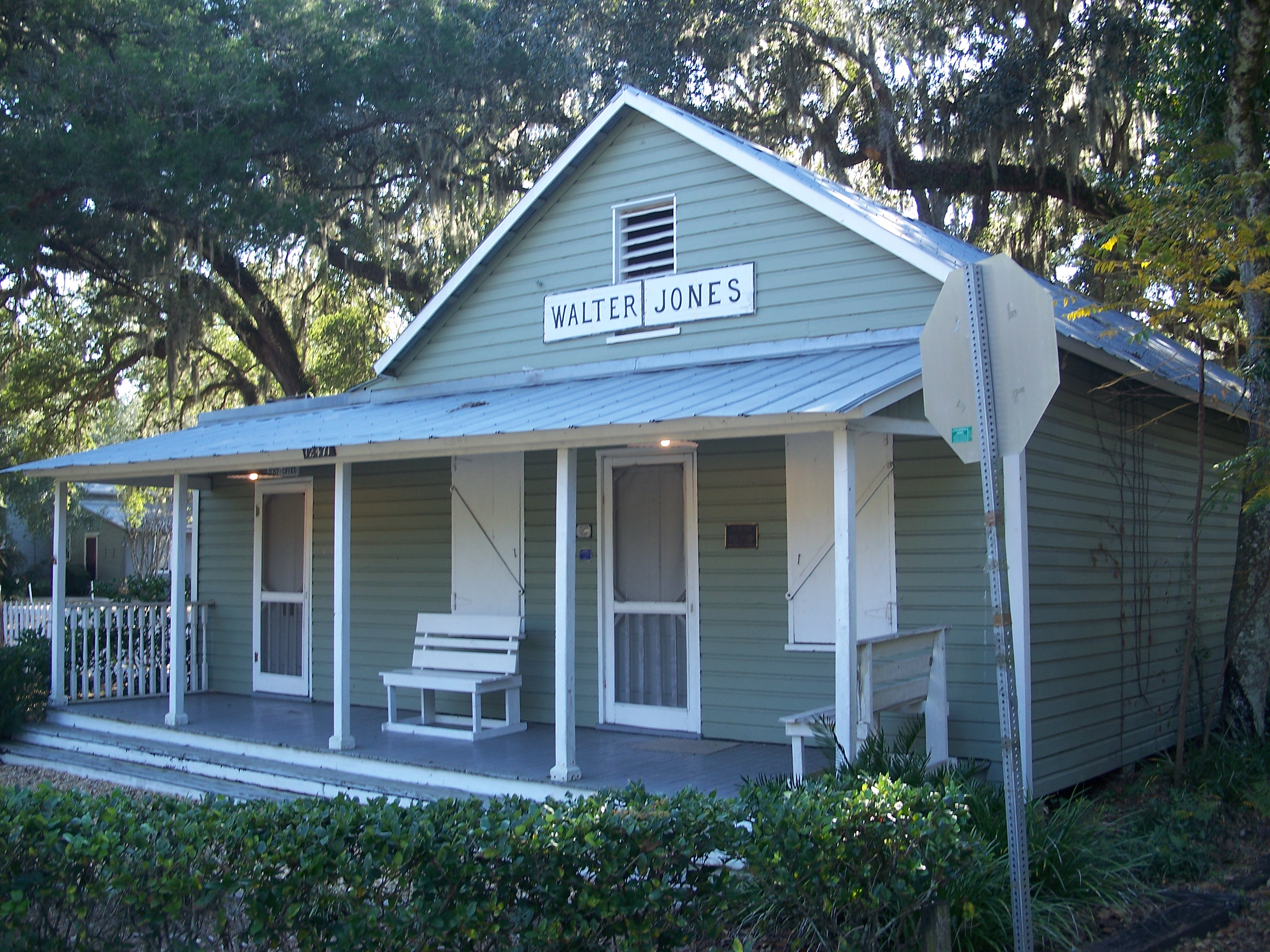

- Location within Florida Location within the United States
- Location: Jacksonville, Florida, USA United States
- Coordinates: 30°9′39″N 81°39′35″W
- Built: 1911
- Architect: William Monson
- Architectural style: Frame Vernacular
- NRHP reference No.: 01001056
- Added to NRHP: October 1, 2001

The Mandarin Store and Post Office, officially known as the Mandarin Museum and also known as the Walter Jones Store and Post Office Museum, is a historic site in Jacksonville, Florida, United States. It is located at 12471 Mandarin Road. On October 1, 2001, it was added to the U.S. National Register of Historic Places.

The general store was in operation from 1911 until 1964, and is operated as a museum by the Mandarin Museum & Historical Society. The museum features some of the store's original furnishings and period memorabilia, and is open twice a month.

== See also ==
- List of United States post offices
