= North Shore Historic District (St. Petersburg, Florida) =

Historic district in Florida, United States

- U.S. National Register of Historic Places
- U.S. Historic district
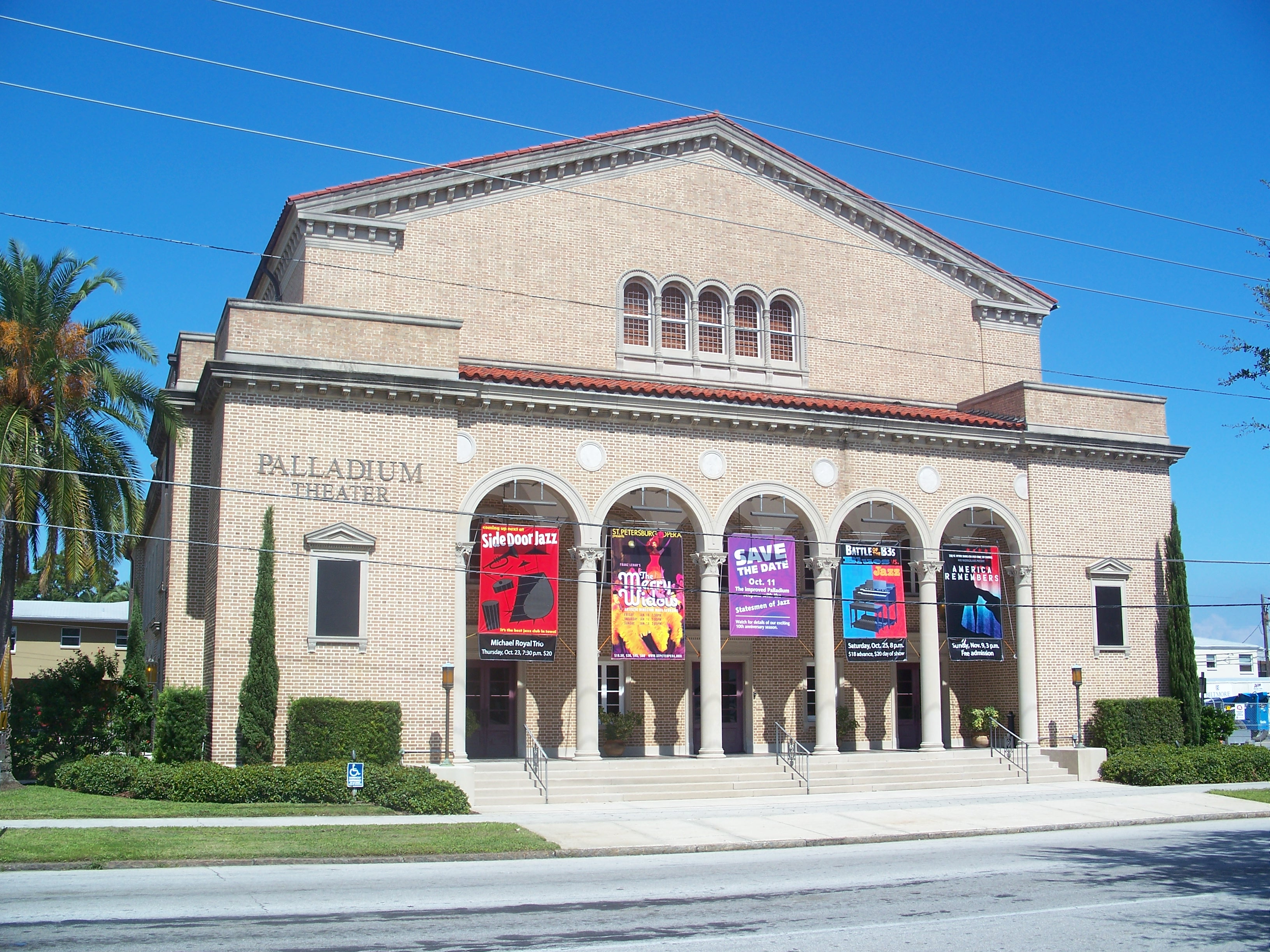
- Palladium Theatre, in the former First Church of Christ Scientist, which was built in 1925

- Location within Florida Location within the United States
- Location: St. Petersburg, Florida
- Coordinates: 27°47′17″N 82°37′58″W
- Area: 4,250 acres (17.2 km^{2})
- NRHP reference No.: 03000040
- Added to NRHP: February 20, 2003

The North Shore Historic District, commonly known as Old Northeast or Historic Old Northeast, is a U.S. historic district (designated as such on February 20, 2003) located in St. Petersburg, Florida. The district, located adjacent to Downtown, is bounded by 4th Street N, 5th Avenue N, Tampa Bay, and 30th Ave N. It contains 2975 historic buildings and 4 objects. This area is mostly residential but does contain some retail, dining, parks and city landmarks. It also has been featured in the "Great Homes and Destinations" section of the New York Times.

== Buildings in the district ==
- First Church of Christ, Scientist (St. Petersburg, Florida)

== See also ==
- National Register of Historic Places listings in Pinellas County, Florida
