= Palladium at St. Petersburg College =

Historic church in Florida, United States

- First Church of Christ, Scientist
- U.S. Historic district – Contributing property
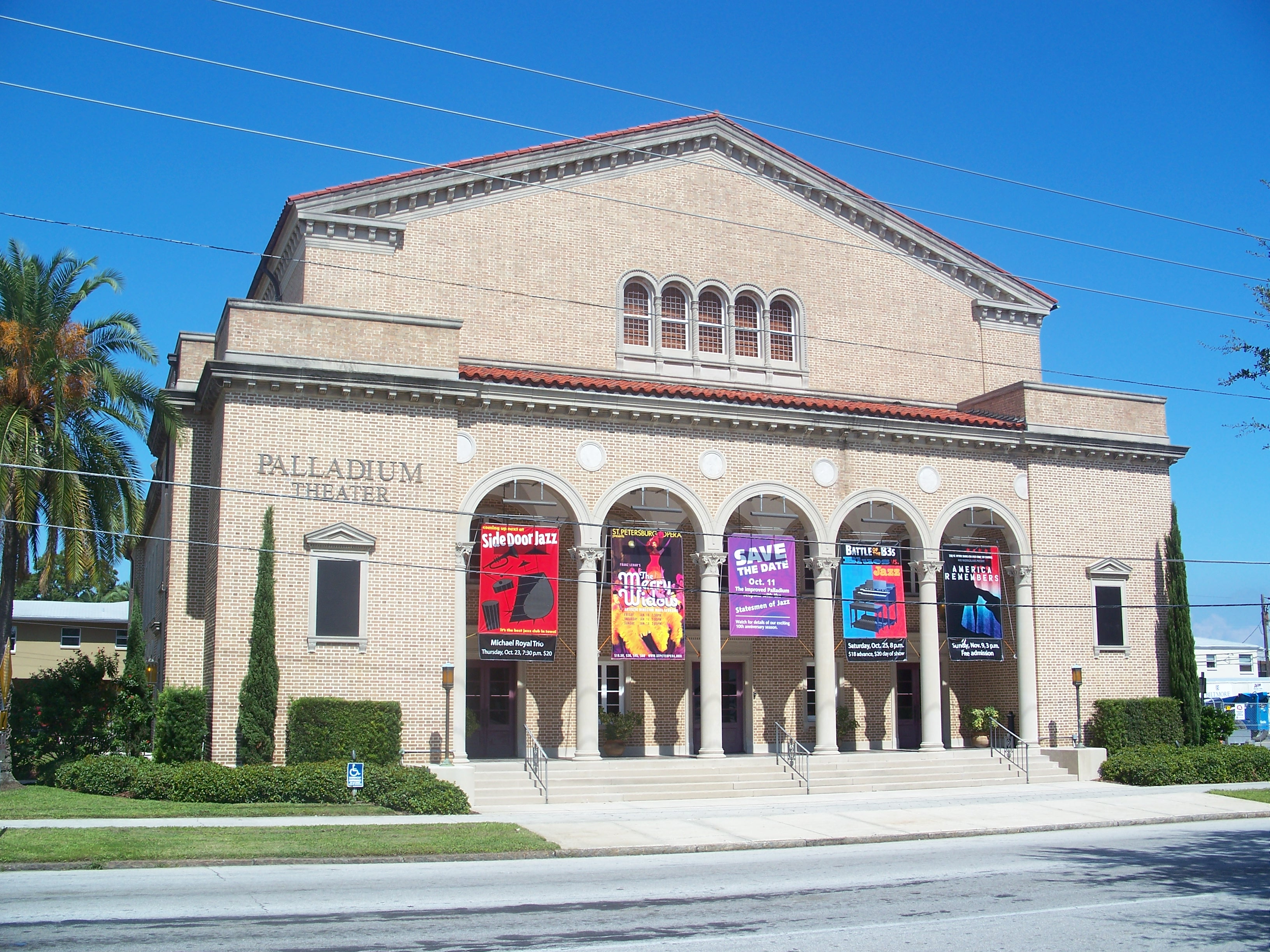
- First Church of Christ Scientist, now the Palladium at St. Petersburg College, in 2008

- Location within Florida Location within the United States
- Location: 253 Fifth Ave. North, St. Petersburg, Florida
- Part of: North Shore Historic District (ID03000040)
- Added to NRHP: February 20, 2003

The Palladium at St. Petersburg College, formerly the First Church of Christ, Scientist, is an historic Christian Science church building located at 253 Fifth Avenue North, in the Old Northeast (St. Petersburg, Florida) neighborhood of St. Petersburg, Florida. Built in 1925, it was designed as a basilican structure in the Romanesque Revival style of architecture by architect Howard Lovewell Cheney. Cheney used Filippo Brunelleschi's 15th century Ospedale degli Innocenti in Florence as his inspiration. The builder was the George A. Fuller Construction Company of New York City, then one of the nation's leading builders.

The building was sold in 1998 to the Palladium Theater, which renovated it for its own use, while preserving as much as possible of the interior, including the 1926 Skinner organ and the magnificent Arts and Crafts style art titlework which came from the Los Angeles studios of famed tilemaker Ernest A. Batchelder. In 2007, the Palladium Theater was given to St. Petersburg College and it is now called the Palladium at St. Petersburg College.

The building is a contributing property in the North Shore Historic District which was added to the National Register of Historic Places on February 20, 2003.

First Church of Christ, Scientist, now holds services at 6333 First Street, Northeast in St. Petersburg.

== See also ==
- List of former Christian Science churches, societies and buildings
- First Church of Christ, Scientist (disambiguation)
