= Old Eau Gallie Post Office =

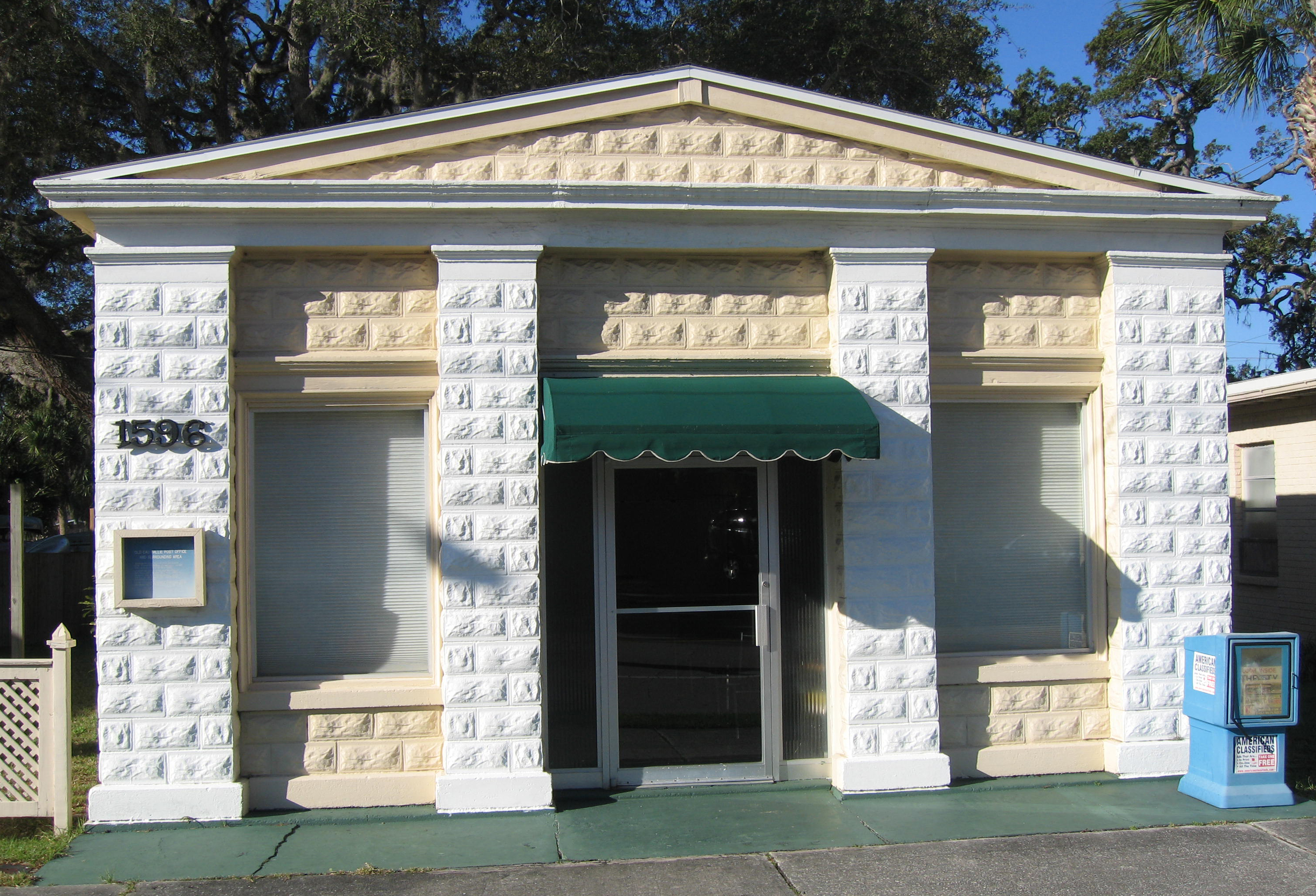
- Front view of Old Eau Gallie Post Office
- Interactive map of the Old Eau Gallie Post Office area

General information
- Location: 1596 Highland Avenue, Eau Gallie, Florida, United States
- Coordinates: 28.13281°N 80.62869°W
- Construction started: 1890s

The Old Eau Gallie Post Office is a historic U.S. building located at 1596 Highland Avenue, in the Eau Gallie section of Melbourne, Florida. The building was constructed in 1890s of rusticated block and was used as a post office from 1900 to 1925.

== See also ==
- List of United States post offices

== Gallery ==
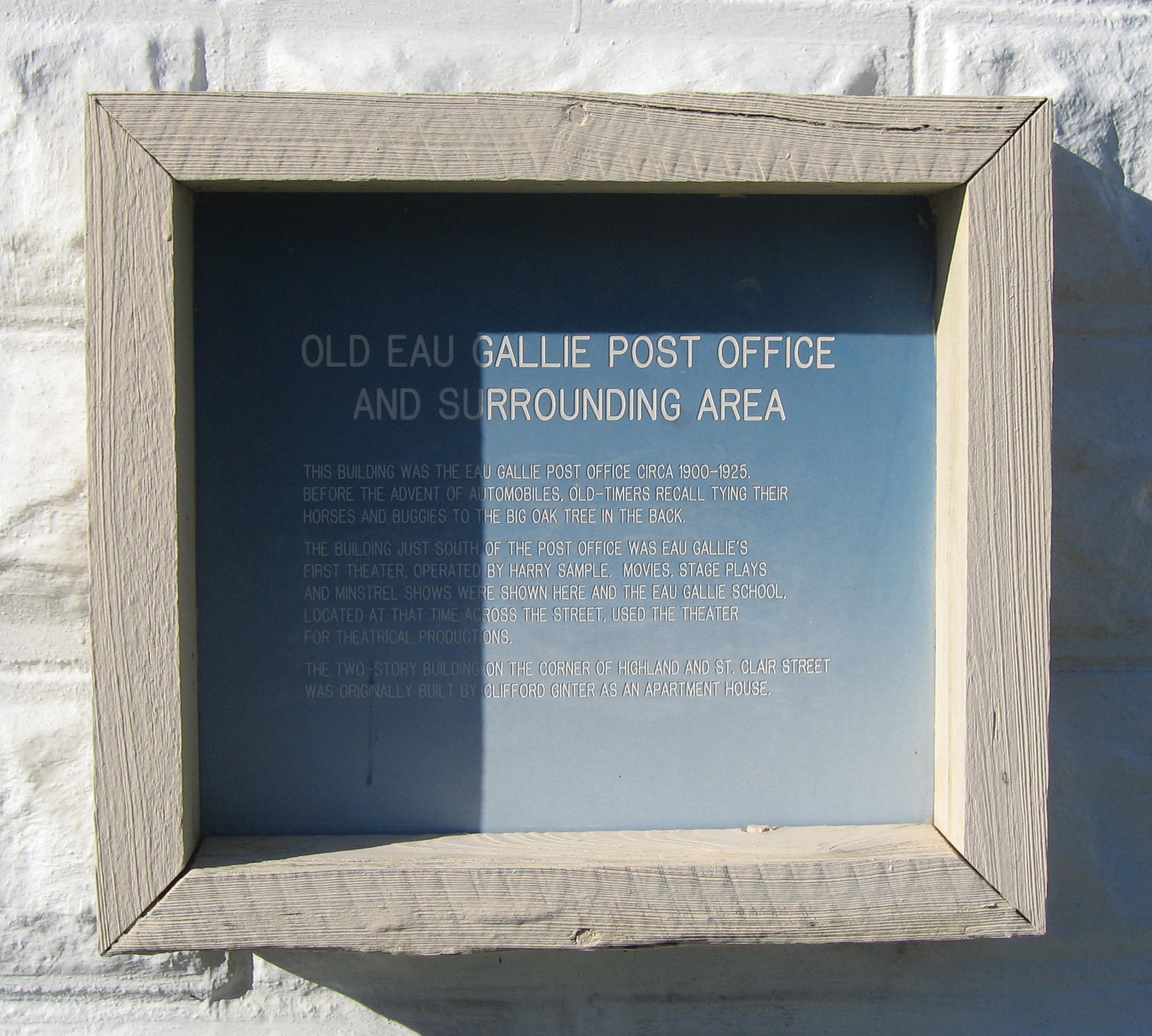
Historical marker attached to building
