= United States Post Office (Palm Beach, Florida) =

- U.S. Post Office
- U.S. National Register of Historic Places
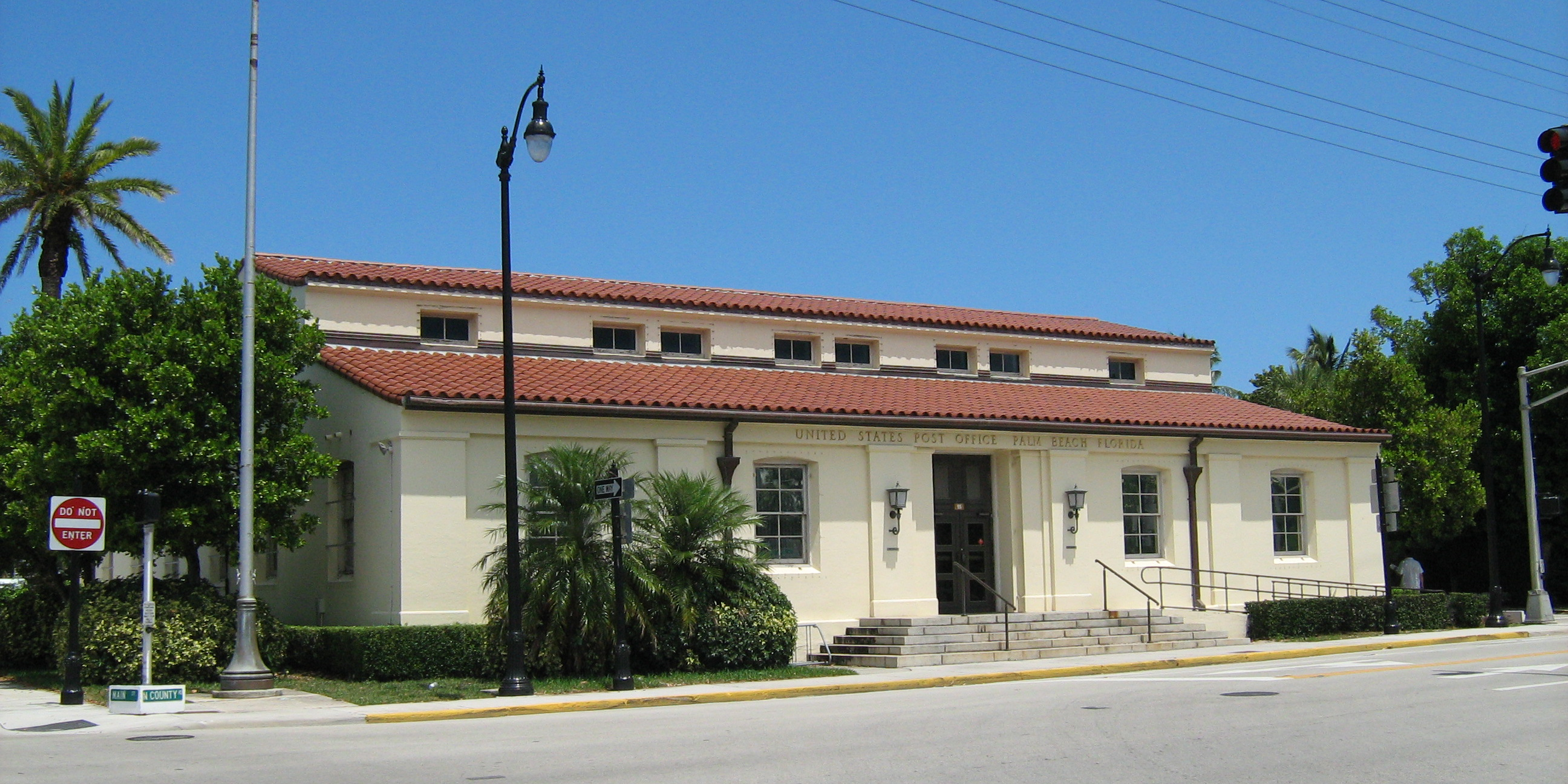
- Main Post Office in the Town of Palm Beach

- Location within Florida Location within the United States
- Location: Palm Beach, Florida
- Coordinates: 26°43′5″N 80°2′18″W
- Built by: Watt & Sinclair of Florida, Inc.
- Architect: Office of the Supervising Architect under Louis A. Simon
- Architectural style: Mission/Spanish Revival
- NRHP reference No.: 83001436
- Added to NRHP: July 21, 1983

The U.S. Post Office, also known as the Main Post Office, at 95 North County Road in Palm Beach, Florida is a historic building. It was used as a post office from 1937 to 2011. It was placed on the National Register of Historic Places in 1983.

== History ==
The U.S. Post Office in Palm Beach, Florida was built through a federal government construction program. Originally, local architect Addison Mizner was selected to design the building; however, the $200,000 cost of constructing his design was prohibitive. Thus, it was designed by Louis A. Simon who was head of the Office of the Supervising Architect for the U.S. Treasury. The redesign cost $164,400 to build. It was built by Watt and Sinclair of Florida, Inc. between 1936 and 1937. Despite the budget cut, this post office included ornamental features that were uncommon for similar government structures in the 1930s Great Depression era.

On July 21, 1983, the U.S. Post Office in Palm Beach was added to the National Register of Historic Places. The United States Postal Service sold the post office to Jeff Green in October 2010 for $3.725 million and moved to a new location in 2011. The building now houses Green's business, Florida Sunshine Investments, Inc.

== Architecture ==
The U.S Post Office in Palm Beach is a two-story structure in Mediterranean Revival or Spanish Colonial Revival style. The building has a masonry and stucco exterior with a two-tier roof of barrel-tile and marble entry stairs. Its lobby features exposed cypress beams across the ceiling. The post box lobby has three murals of Seminole scenes that were painted by Charles Rosen in 1938.

== Gallery ==
Main Post Office in Palm Beach, Florida

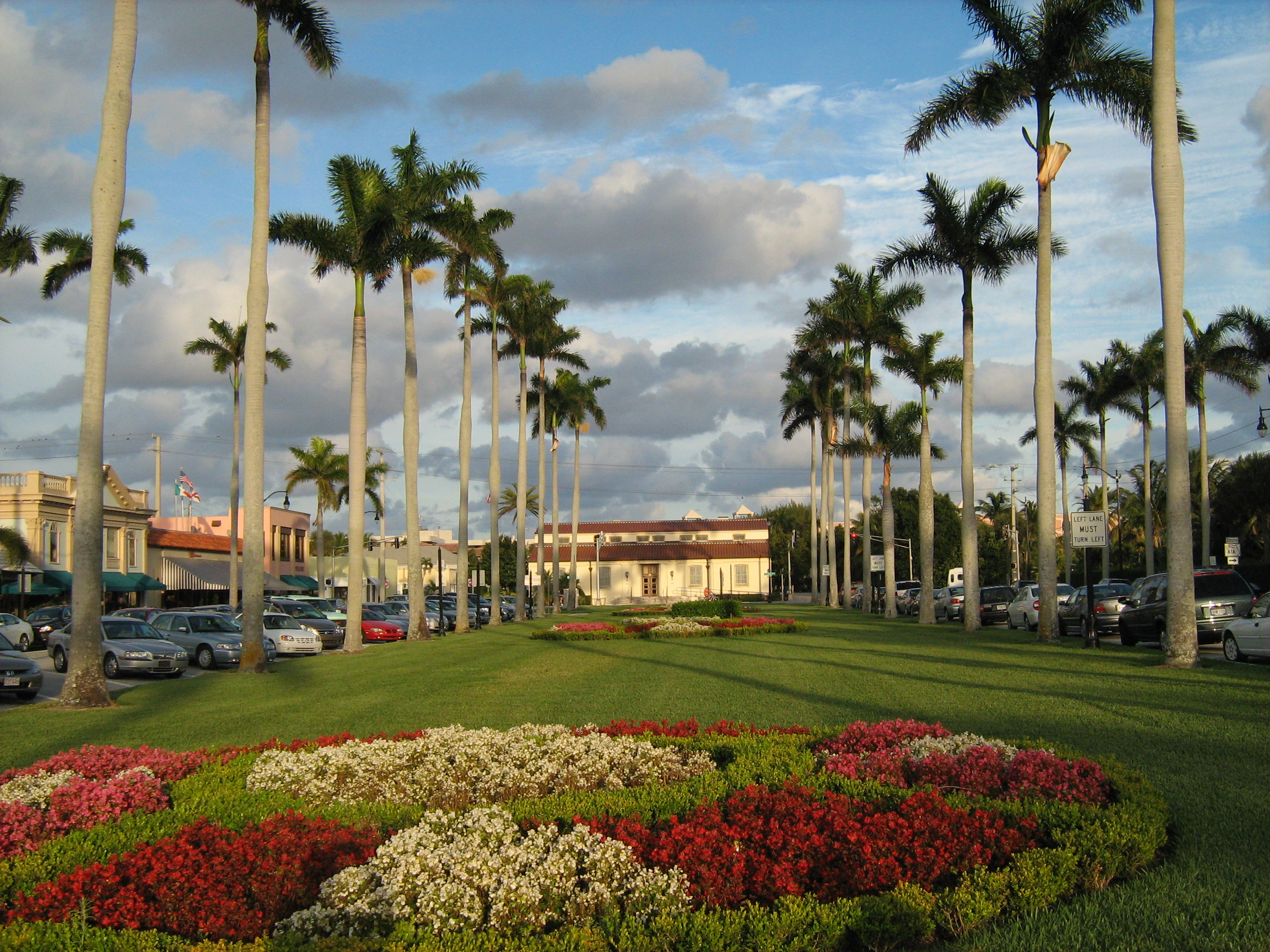
Viewed from the median of Royal Poinciana Way

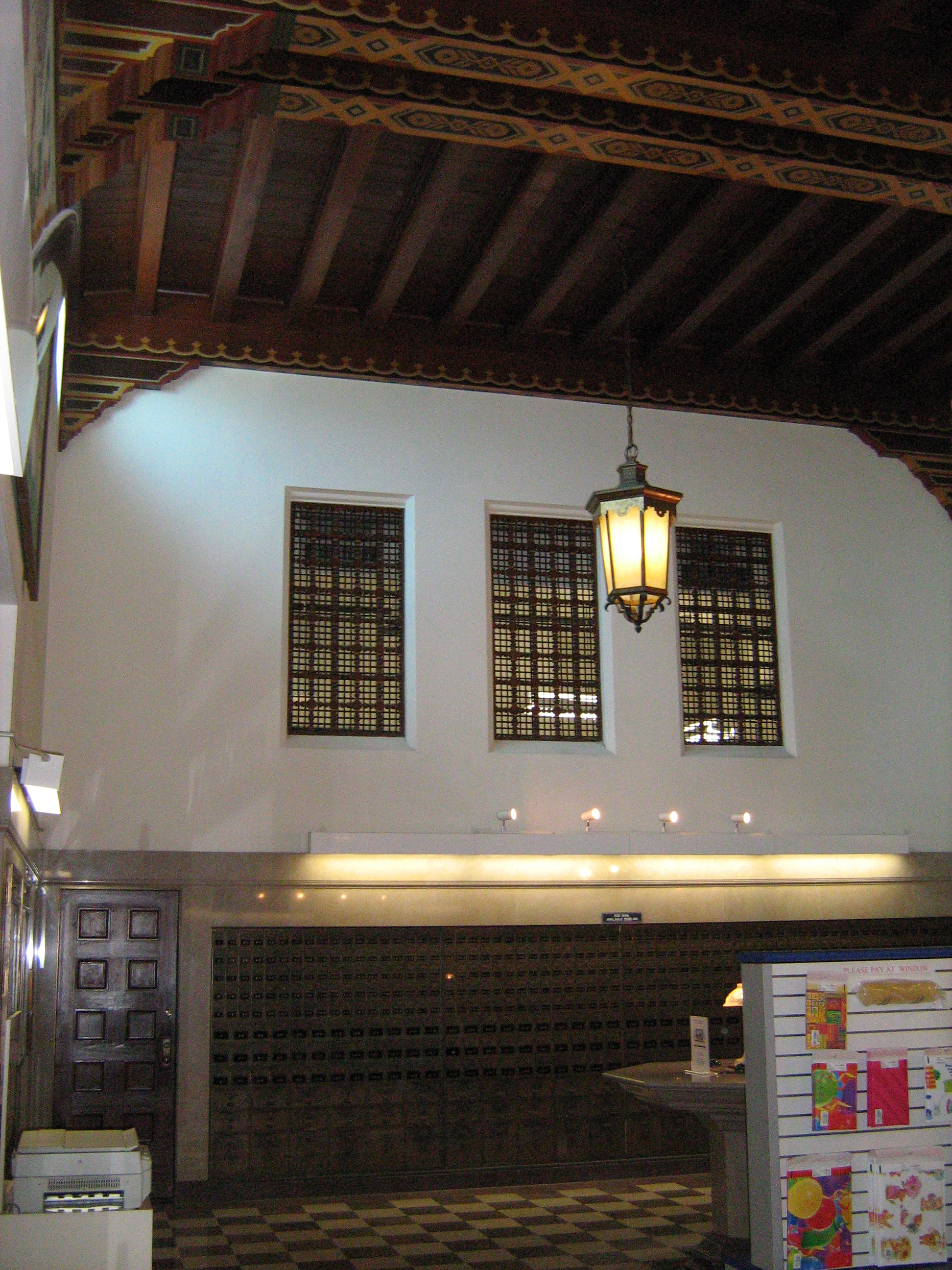
Interior wall

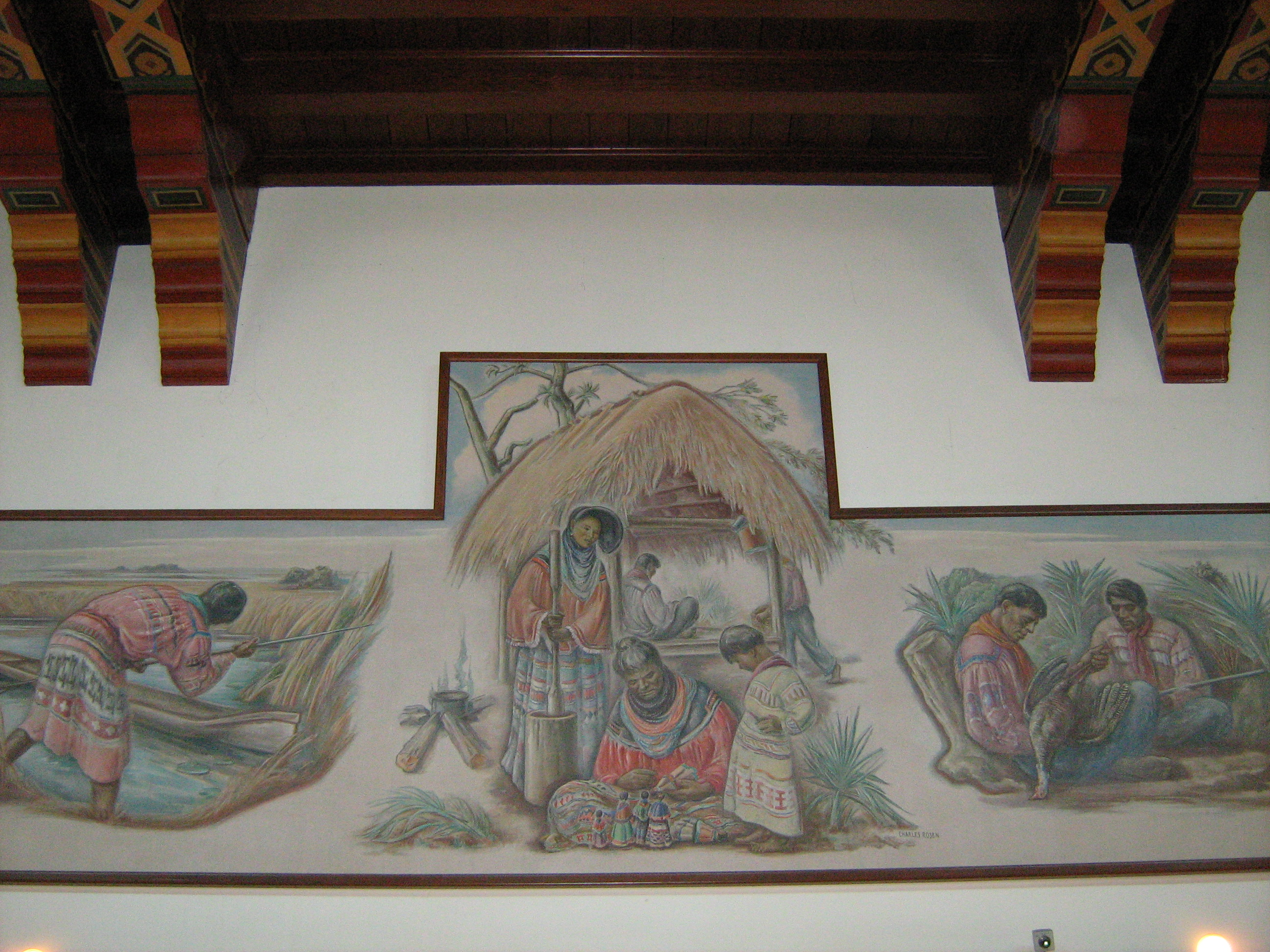
Main mural in the interior

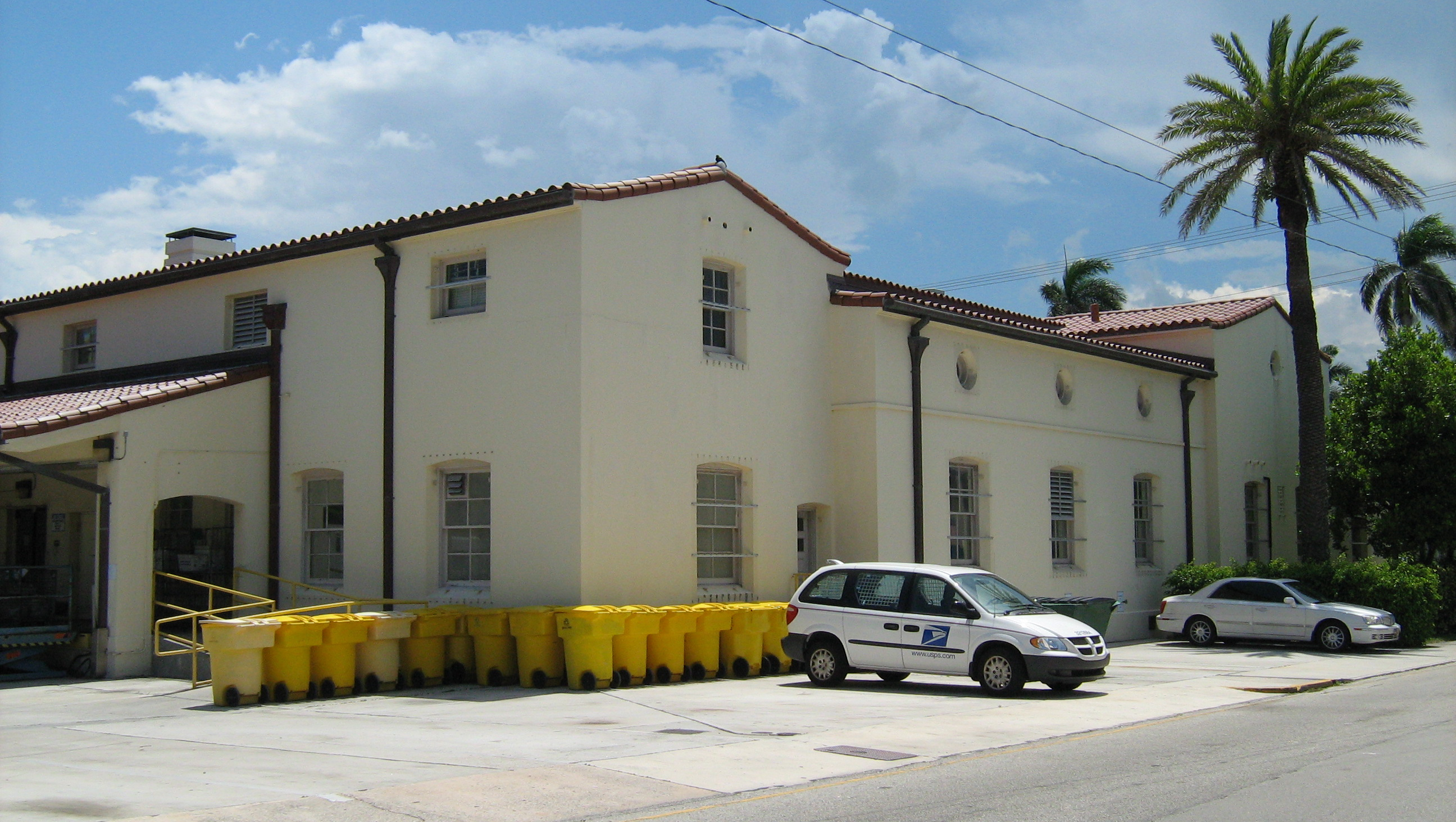
North side of building

== See also ==
- List of United States post offices
