= Transportation in Brevard County, Florida =

Brevard County, Florida has transportation available in the usual modes for a coastal county - highways, shipping, and airlines.

Regular, scheduled, commercial airline service is provided from the county by the Melbourne International Airport. The airport serves about half a million people annually. It is served by Delta Air Lines and several regional airlines. No tax money is used to fund operations. The airport owns, develops and rents lands adjacent to the airport, many for non-aviation related purposes.

Space Coast Area Transit is a government-subsidized bus system serving the County area. Besides providing routine transportation, low cost service is available to disabled and disadvantaged citizens.

Barges can be an inexpensive form of transporting goods in Brevard. This was important to NASA, since the barge canals connected the Michoud Assembly Facility in Louisiana which worked on the Shuttle's External Fuel Tanks and then transported them to the Space Center. Barges are usable the length of Brevard in the Intracoastal Waterway. Among other uses, barges are employed for very heavy lifting where road transport would be impossible because of the total weight involved.

The county government regulates taxicabs throughout the county, including municipalities.

== Airports ==
- Arthur Dunn Airpark
- Melbourne International Airport
- Merritt Island Airport
- Space Coast Regional Airport
- Valkaria Airport

== Major highways ==
Extending all the way from the northern boundary with Volusia County to the southern boundary with Indian River County is the major expressway Interstate 95, which links all cities in Brevard County with each other, and with Daytona Beach to the north, and Vero Beach to the south. Extending westward from downtown Melbourne is the major highway US Rte-192, providing access to Osceola County.

The county has 1,092 miles (1,757 km) of roads to maintain that are outside of incorporated municipalities, plus 99 miles (159 km) within cities. It also has 12.511 streetlights and 223 traffic signals.

Motorists drove 7,720,000 miles (12,420,000 km) across the county in 1997–98. They drove 8,200,000 miles (13,200,000 km) in 2007–08. During the same time, traffic on I-95 and SR 528 rose 55%: from 2,940,000 miles (4,730,000 km) to 4,560,000 miles (7,340,000 km). There are about 300 gas stations in the county.

Travelocity.com named route A1A which runs along the Brevard shore as the "Best Driving Route" in Florida.

See State Roads in Florida for explanation of numbering system.

- I-95 (SR 9 / Interstate 95)* 21 of the 99 local fatalities in 2007 occurred on I-95
- US 1 (SR 5)*
- US 192 (SR 500)** - "New Haven Avenue" with a few blocks in old downtown Melbourne called "Strawbridge Avenue"
- SR A1A*
- SR 3
- SR 46
- SR 50*
- SR 404 (Pineda Causeway)
- SR 405
- SR 406
- SR 407 (Challenger Memorial Parkway)
- SR 501
- SR 503
- SR 507 (Babcock Street)
- SR 507 (NASA Boulevard)
- SR 509
- SR 511
- SR 513
- SR 514
- SR 516
- SR 518
- SR 519
- SR 520*
- SR 524
- SR 528*

* Signifies that the road is almost always called by its number locally.

** Signifies that the road is often called by its number by locals.

Nearly all other routes are referenced locally by name, not its number

Houses are assigned odd numbers on the east and north of roads. This is true even when the road changes direction, so the numbers can switch sides.

== Bridges ==
Seven bridges cross the Indian River Lagoon providing clearances for boat traffic using the Intracoastal Waterway, and five bridges provide access to the Banana River Lagoon.

Five bridges connect the mainland to Merritt Island, Florida.

- A. Max Brewer Memorial Parkway (CR 402)
- NASA Causeway (West) (SR 405)
- Emory L. Bennett Causeway (SR 528/SR A1A)
- Hubert H. Humphrey Bridge (Merritt Island Causeway)) (SR 520)
- Pineda Bridge (Pineda Causeway) (SR 404)

Two bridges connect the mainland to the barrier island:

- Dr. W. J. Creel Bridge (Eau Gallie Causeway) (SR 518)
- Ernest Kouwen-Hoven Bridge (Melbourne Causeway) (US 192)/(SR 500)

Five bridges connect Merritt Island, Florida to the barrier island:

- NASA Parkway (East) (SR 405)
- Banana River Bridge (Emory L. Bennett Causeway) (SR 528/SR A1A)
- Willard Peebles Bridge (Merritt Island Causeway) (SR 520)
- Banana River Bridge (Pineda Causeway) (SR 404)
- Mathers Bridge

== Canals and channels ==
The county and its constituted cities maintain 160 miles (260 km) of canals and channels, excluding the Intracoastal Waterway, 70 miles (110 km) of which is inside the county.

== Rail Lines ==
The Florida East Coast Railway runs through the county. There are 146 railroad crossings. 41 of these were given a low safety rating by the Florida Department of Transportation. These low ratings may result in the allocation of public funds for upgrades.

In the early 1900s the Union Cypress Railroad was built from present day Lipscomb Rd and University Blvd west to Deer Park.
