= Florida State Road 528 =

Highway in Florida

State Road 528
- Martin Andersen Beachline Expressway
- SR 528 highlighted in red

Route information
- Maintained by FTE, CFX, and FDOT
- Length: 53.499 mi (86.098 km)
- Existed: February 16, 1974–present

Major junctions
- West end: I-4 near Doctor Phillips
- Florida's Turnpike / US 17 / US 92 / US 441 near Williamsburg; SR 436 in Orlando; SR 417 in Orlando; SR 407 near Cocoa; I-95 in Cocoa; US 1 in Cocoa; SR 401 near Cape Canaveral
- East end: SR A1A near Cape Canaveral

Location
- Country: United States
- State: Florida
- Counties: Orange, Brevard

Highway system
- Florida State Highway System; Interstate; US; State; Former; Pre‑1945; Toll; Scenic
← SR 527	→ SR 530

State Road 528 (SR 528), alternatively named the Martin Andersen Beachline Expressway (with parts previously named the Bee Line Expressway), is a partially-tolled freeway in the U.S. state of Florida; it is maintained by the Florida's Turnpike Enterprise (FTE), the Central Florida Expressway Authority (CFX), and the Florida Department of Transportation (FDOT). Spanning approximately 53 miles (85 km) along a west–east axis, it connects Interstate 4 (I-4) in Orlando with I-95, Titusville, and Cape Canaveral on the Space Coast. It passes close to the tourist areas of Orlando, including SeaWorld and Universal Orlando, and serves the north entrance to Orlando International Airport. Near its east end, it passes over the Intracoastal Waterway on the Emory L. Bennett Causeway, and ends at SR A1A and SR 401 near Port Canaveral.

Martin Andersen, a retired publisher, used his influence to get the original stretch of road (from SR 520 to Orlando International Airport) built in the 1960s.

The entire Beachline is compatible with the SunPass, E-Pass, Peach Pass, NC Quick Pass, and E-ZPass electronic toll collection transponders on both mainline plazas and interchange tolls.

== Route description ==
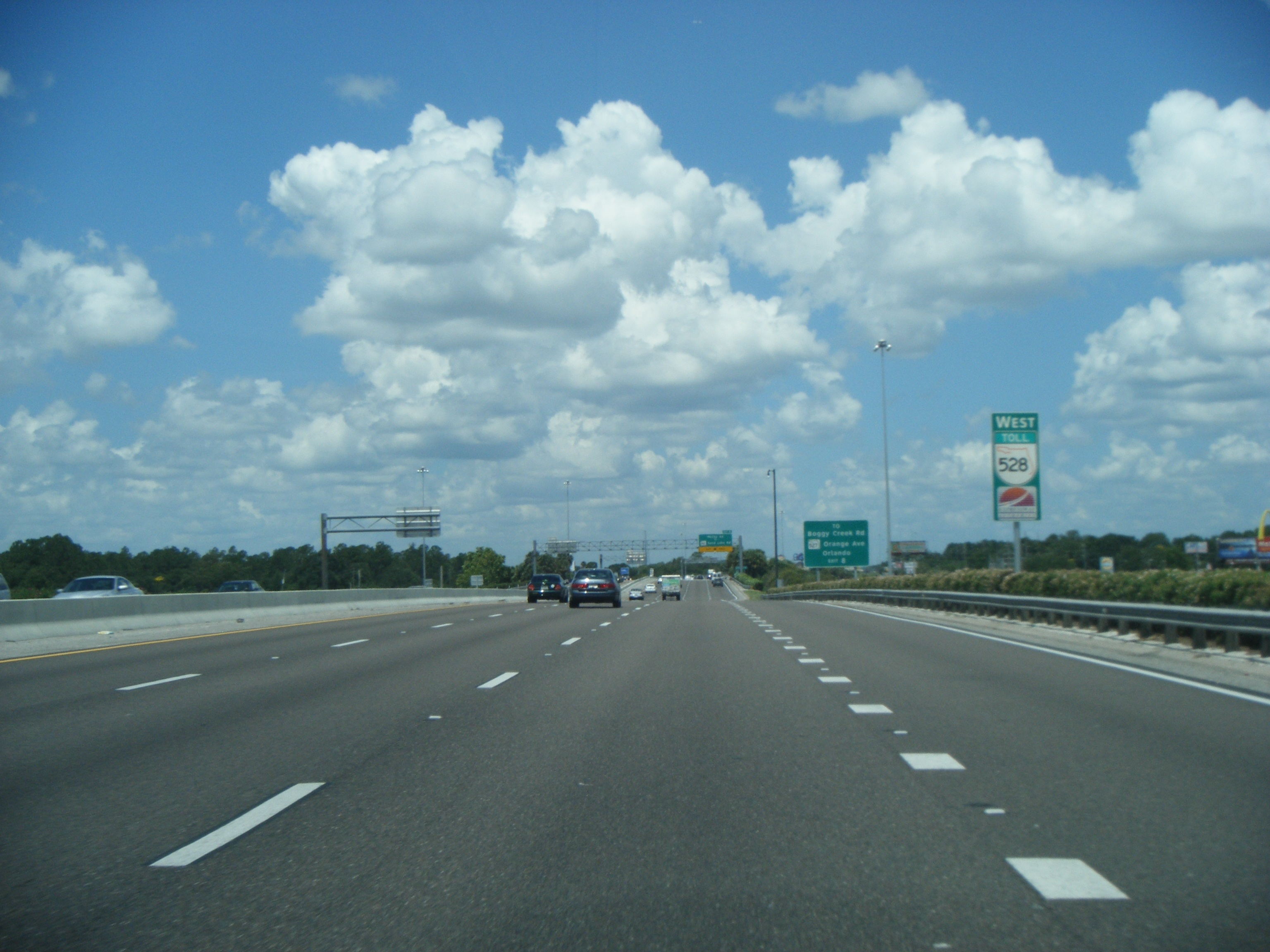
SR 528 westbound approaching SR 482 in Orlando

The westernmost eight miles (13 km) of the Beachline Expressway, from I-4 to SR 482 near the airport, is known as the Beachline West Expressway and is FTE owned. The section of the expressway is most famous for providing the link for tourists between Orlando International Airport and Orlando area attractions such as SeaWorld and Universal Orlando, and Walt Disney World via I-4. The Beachline begins at an interchange with I-4 (exit 72), and heads east, with interchanges with the tourist-driven International Drive, Orangewood Boulevard, and John Young Parkway. The highway then jogs north to a massive combined interchange with Florida's Turnpike and US 17/US 92/US 441 (Orange Blossom Trail) at exit 4; this interchange serves The Florida Mall to the north of the road. The section of the Beachline Expressway from exit 0 to exit 4, with the exception of the express lanes, is a "free movement" section, requiring no tolls. The expressway continues east to the Beachline West barrier toll and then to SR 482 (McCoy Road/Sand Lake Road) (exit 8), ending FTE maintenance at the northwest edge of the airport.

CFX maintenance begins at the northwest corner of the airport, with a free movement section between exits 8 and 9 (Tradeport Drive/Conway Road), followed by two airport-access interchanges with SR 436 and Goldenrod Road. The last of the Beachline's free movement sections is between SR 436 and with SR 15 just east of the airport. Three miles (4.8 km) east of the airport, it intersects with the SR 417 (Central Florida GreeneWay), heading out of Orlando, with the road straightening out as a beeline for the rest of its journey in Orange County. From the GreeneWay to I-95, the Beachline Expressway travels through mostly uninhabited marshlands. It intersects with a barrier toll just east of the GreeneWay, and has interchanges with Innovation Way and Dallas Boulevard, followed by one more barrier toll. East of the toll plaza, SR 528 reaches SR 520, the last interchange before the Orange–Brevard county line, ending CFX maintenance and tolls.

FDOT maintenance begins at the eastern end of the SR 520 interchange, and SR 528 crosses the St. Johns River into Brevard County at mile 35.775. Just east of the Brevard County line, the road veers southeast at the interchange with SR 407. It then enters the Space Coast development area before the interchange with I-95 at exit 205 (signed as exit 42AB on SR 528). It continues east, with interchanges with SR 501/SR 524 and US 1 before crossing over the Intracoastal Waterway on the Emory L. Bennett Causeway, followed by interchanges with SR 3 and Banana River Drive before ending at SR A1A and SR 401 near Port Canaveral.

== Tolls ==
There are three mainline toll plazas on the tollway and each of them have at least two express lanes dedicated to SunPass for electronic toll collection, which do not require motorists to stop at a booth, as well as lanes dedicated to cash collection. While the Dallas Boulevard off ramp has a dedicated ETC lane along with an exact change lane, the other two ramp toll plazas only have a combined ETC/Exact Change lane, with no change provided.

The Central Florida Expressway Authority, which operates part of the Beachline from McCoy Road, just east of the airport, to SR 520, accepts E-ZPass. FTE, which operates the Beachline from McCoy road west, also accepts E-ZPass.

Tolls on the east-pointing ramps at SR 520 are collected by FDOT, and 25 cents of the $1.25 CFX barrier toll east of the airport also goes to FDOT. There are no toll roads in Brevard County so technically the 25 cents is only for use of the FDOT road section in Orange County. Nonetheless, most road maps show the Brevard County section from the Orange County line to I-95 to be a toll road because it is impossible to travel over it without incurring a toll elsewhere. The Toll SR 528 shield is also used on this stretch of road as well as on exit signs along I-95.

The current toll rates took effect in July 2012.

Two managed lanes in each direction were opened in 2019 and 2020 for the eight miles between I-4 and McCoy Road near Orlando International Airport. They were originally built as Express Lanes with congestion-based tolling, but the additional tolls were never implemented, and they have now officially been converted to Thru Lanes. Although drivers will pay the same toll as for the general use lanes, a SunPass or compatible transponder is required to use the Thru Lanes. Eastbound drivers can enter from the general use lanes just east of I-4, and can exit shortly before Consulate Drive and Florida's Turnpike, or just before the airport. Westbound drivers can enter just west of the airport or the Turnpike, and exit only at I-4.

== History ==
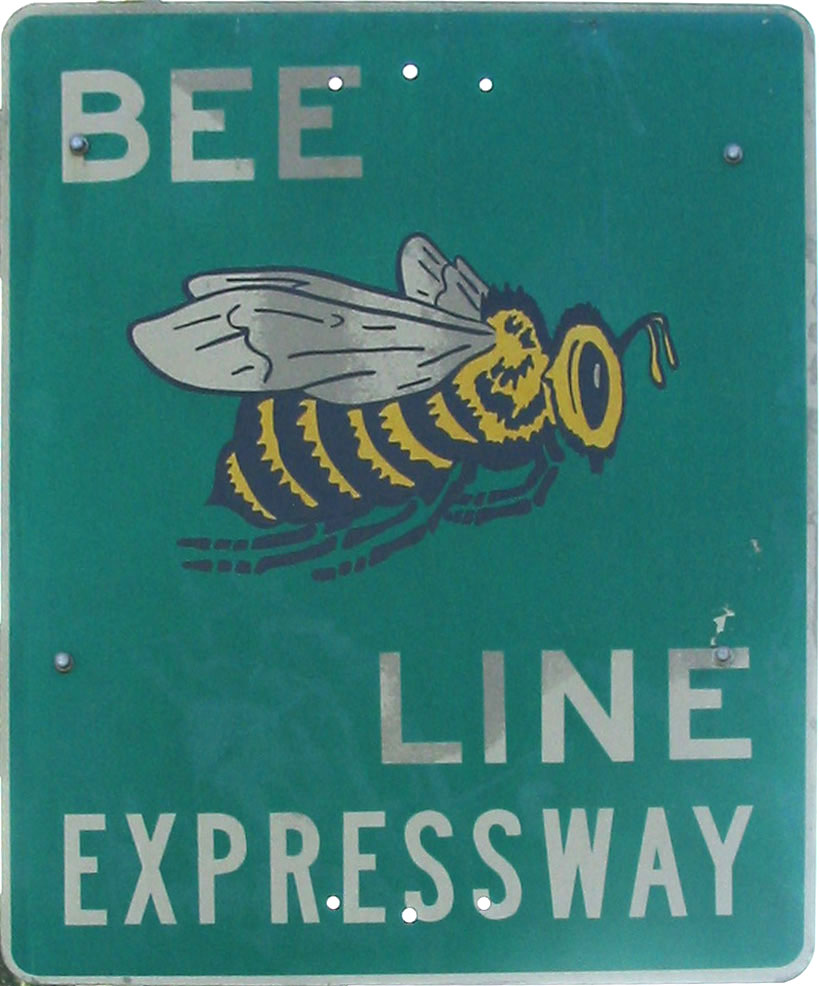
Old Bee Line Expressway sign

=== Pre-Bee Line ===
==== Orlando area ====
Prior to the construction of the Bee Line, State Road 528 was a surface road connecting Interstate 4 with the McCoy Jetport (now Orlando International Airport) and SR 15 (Narcoossee Road). It ran along Sand Lake Road (now State Road 482) from I-4 east to Orange Blossom Trail (US 17/US 92/US 441, SR 500/SR 600), where it turned south to reach Landstreet Road. Landstreet Road took SR 528 to Orange Avenue (SR 527) at Taft, where SR 528 turned back north to McCoy Road. McCoy Road led east past the north entrance to the Jetport to SR 15; part of this is now SR 482, while part of McCoy Road from about one mile (1.6 km) east of SR 527 now serves as a frontage road to the Beachline Expressway.

An interchange at SR 528 and Kirkman Road (SR 435) was built c. 1958 to serve the new Martin Marietta complex (now Lockheed Martin) just to the south of that junction. At that time, the area at the west end of SR 528 was basically empty, and the land was a part of the extensive Martin-owned Orlando Central Park, covering roughly the area bounded by I-4 to the west/northwest, the Florida Turnpike to the northeast/east, and SR 482 (West Sand Lake Road) to the south.

==== Bennett Causeway and Bee Line Expressway ====
The Emory L. Bennett Causeway and approaches, running from SR 520 west of Cocoa northeast on what is now SR 524 and east across US 1, the Indian River Lagoon, Merritt Island and the Banana River, was dedicated on October 11, 1963, as a two-lane toll bridge and road. It was assigned the SR 528 number over its whole length. At the same time, the present SR 401 north of SR 528 was also built. The causeway was named in honor of Emory L. Bennett, recipient of the Medal of Honor for his actions during the Korean War, and is part of the Indian River Lagoon Scenic Highway. SR 528 was initially opened in 1967 and named "The Bee Line Expressway," because it "beelined" east to Interstate 95. The Bee Line Expressway's southern fork was the mainline SR 528 and went to Interstate 95 and then Bennett Causeway to Cocoa Beach, while its northern fork, also designated SR 407, went northeast to I-95 and SR 405 (Columbia Boulevard) at Titusville. (Note: Beeline simply meant the most direct path from one point to another)

=== Construction ===
==== SR 15 to SR 520 ====
Martin Andersen, then owner of the Orlando Sentinel, helped form the Central Florida Development Commission to ensure that Orlando would prosper, with one of its goals being developing an "adequate road system". With the completion of Florida's Turnpike and I-4 in 1963 and 1965, Orlando had freeway connections to the northwest, southwest, southeast and northeast, but lacked such a connection to the Kennedy Space Center to the east.

A bill creating the Orlando-Orange County Expressway Authority (OOCEA) was signed into law in 1963, which, unlike the State Road Department (SRD), could raise money for new roads using tolls. Its immediate goal was to build a road to the Kennedy Space Center, but the law was written with the intent of a larger expressway network.

The OOCEA wanted to build a freeway all the way from I-4 to Cape Canaveral, but ran into several problems. It had issues with raising money for the road; traffic projections fell short of necessary to pay for the large bond issue required. It also did not have the authority to build in Brevard County, and many Brevard residents opposed the roads, as it would draw business away from the Cape Canaveral area to Orlando.

The setbacks resulted in a much shorter expressway route running from SR 15 (Narcoosee Road) east of the McCoy Jetport east to SR 520 in east Orange County. This was known as the Bithlo Cutoff, as it allowed traffic from southern Orlando to reach SR 520 without going north and east to Bithlo. West of SR 15, the existing SR 528 was to carry traffic to I-4. A new alignment would be built between Orange Blossom Trail and Orange Avenue (SR 527), directly connecting Sand Lake Road to McCoy Road (SR 482), and McCoy Road east from Daetwyler Drive (the Jetport entrance) to SR 15 would be widened as a divided surface road. Additionally, to handle traffic from downtown Orlando, SR 15 (Hoffner Avenue) between Conway Road and Goldenrod Road would be rebuilt. Concurrently, the SRD was extending Lake Barton Road (now SR 436, Semoran Boulevard) south to the Jetport, where it would meet the Bee Line, which opened in 1969.

In November 1964, the OOCEA and SRD signed an agreement where the OOCEA would build the road, and then turn it over to the SRD, which would operate and maintain it, giving toll revenue to the OOCEA. Construction of the $6.8 million (equivalent to $51.5 million in 2025) project began in early 1966, with groundbreaking at the location of the present Dallas Boulevard interchange (exit 24). The 17.4-mile (28.0 km) road was dedicated on July 14, 1967, at the toll plaza just east of SR 15, and the remaining section (Orange Blossom Trail to Orange Avenue) opened nine days later. The OOCEA board had voted to name it after Martin Andersen in December 1966, and in 1967 the Florida Legislature passed this designation into law.

==== I-4 to McCoy Jetport and SR 520 to the Bennett Causeway ====
In early 1967, the Florida State Turnpike Authority (FTA) announced plans for an expansion of the Turnpike System, including taking over the existing Bee Line and Bennett Causeway and forming a continuous route from the Turnpike to the Atlantic Ocean, with a spur (now SR 407) to the Orsino Causeway. Enabling legislation was signed into law in July 1967. However, inflation caused problems with that plan. In December 1968, bonds were sold for a joint project—FTA would build from McCoy Jetport west to the Turnpike (at the existing Orlando-South interchange with Orange Blossom Trail), and Orange and Brevard Counties would fund the extension from SR 520 east to the Bennett and Orsino Causeways, in addition to a four-laning on the Bennett Causeway.

An interchange at SR 15 replaced an at-grade crossing c. 1971.

The FTA planned to build from the Turnpike east past the Jetport to SR 15, upgrading the existing SR 528 (McCoy Road) with frontage roads from west of the Jetport to SR 15. An interchange would be provided with the new SR 436, planned to open in 1969. However, Governor Claude Kirk insisted that the new road continue west past the Turnpike to I-4, and so the FTA did not have enough money to upgrade the road past the Jetport. (The FTA merged into the new Florida Department of Transportation (FDOT) in 1969.) The piece from west of the Jetport to the Turnpike opened in late July 1973, and the rest of the road to I-4 opened in December. The road had one toll booth lying between the Turnpike and Jetport. The rest of the road to I-4 was free; initially there were no interchanges except at International Drive, just east of I-4, but overpasses were built at roughly one-mile intervals which would eventually provide exits for Orangewood Boulevard and John Young Parkway.

At the same time, construction had begun on the eastern section, originally known as the Central Florida Expressway, by December 1971. The road ran east from SR 520 past a toll booth to the St. Johns River, where it crossed into Brevard County. Shortly after crossing, it split, with a two-lane spur (SR 407) heading northeast, intersecting I-95, and ending at SR 405 west of the Orsino Causeway for access to the central part of the Kennedy Space Center. The main line headed southeast from the split and then east across I-95 to join the Bennett Causeway approach just west of US 1. The causeway was widened, with a new eastbound side added c. 1970–1971, and the extension of the Bee Line to connect with the two causeways opened February 16, 1974. The former Bennett Causeway approach west of the new road became SR 524.

==== At the Orlando International Airport ====
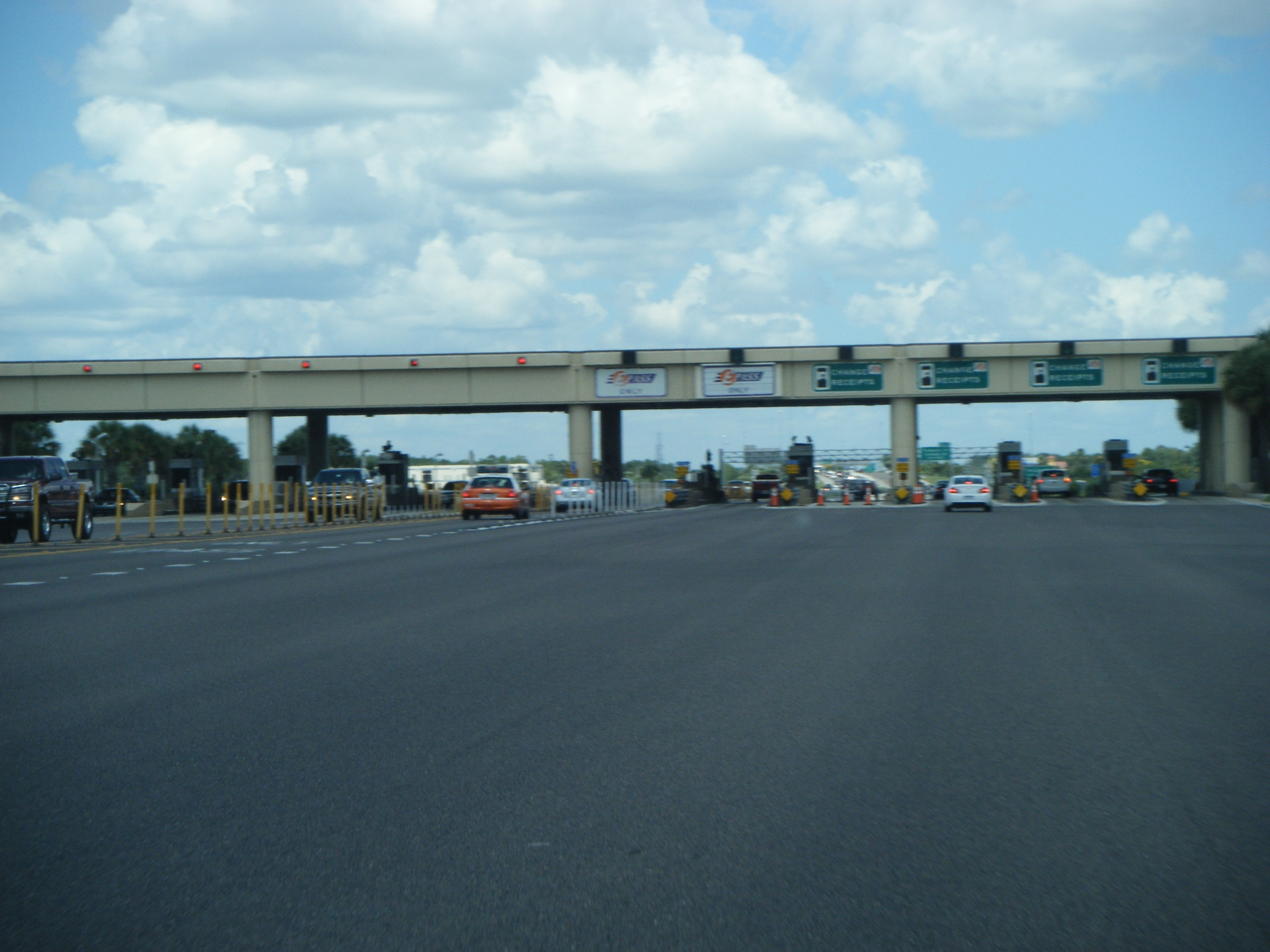
Airport Toll Plaza before its removal in 2016

While the sections west and east of the Jetport were freeways, the piece along McCoy Road, from west of the Jetport to SR 15, was a four-lane divided surface road. It had two major intersections—Daetwyler Drive (the Jetport entrance) and Semoran Boulevard (SR 436), and a number of minor access points. Adding to the need for an upgrade was the Greater Orlando Aviation Authority's plans for expanding the Jetport (which became Orlando International Airport once the expansion was complete in September 1981).

To help pay for the upgrade, the OOCEA raised tolls at the Bee Line toll plaza (east of SR 15) from 35 cents to 50 cents (equivalent to $1.37–1.95 in 2025) Bonds were sold in January 1981, and the finished SR 436/Airport interchange was dedicated on January 21, 1983. The toll plaza just west of the Airport interchange opened July 2, 1983.

In 2016, the Airport Toll Plaza was removed replacing it with four ramp tolls on exits 8 and 9.

=== Later changes ===
The spaces left for interchanges on the section west of the Turnpike have since been used by junctions with Orangewood Boulevard and Universal Boulevard, John Young Parkway and a partial interchange at Consulate. The Turnpike constructed a southbound SunPass-only off-ramp at milepost 255 to Consulate Drive, which provides a more direct connection to westbound Beachline via the Consulate ramps, and incidentally to Orange Blossom Trail. This ramp is used primarily by commuters; cash customers, mostly tourists, must exit at Turnpike exit 254 to make this connection. Consulate is a partial interchange, to and from westbound Beachline only. East of SR 15, similar connections have been built with International Corporate Park Boulevard and Dallas Boulevard.

The interchange with SR 417 (the Eastern Beltway) opened June 26, 1990, resulting in the toll booth east of SR 15 being moved several miles east.

Tolls were removed on the Bennett Causeway on June 29, 1990, as the bonds were paid off, making the road free east of the SR 520 interchange.

With the startup of the Disney Cruise Line from Port Canaveral in 1998, Disney started running buses along the Bee Line for tourists going between Walt Disney World and the port.

SR 528 east of SR 436 was designated the Kennedy Space Center Highway in 1998 by the Florida Legislature.

The 20-cent FDOT toll booth east of SR 520 was rounded up to 25 cents in July 1996 to improve efficiency. After an agreement signed May 8, 1998 by the OOCEA and FDOT, it was removed May 11, and replaced with an additional 25 cents at the $1 (originally 35-cent) OOCEA toll east of SR 417. The extra 25 cents goes to FDOT, as traffic that exits at SR 520 now has to pay an extra quarter—the 25-cent ramp tolls pointing eastward at the SR 520 interchange were added August 19, 1999.

The last at-grade interchange on the original Bee Line alignment, a connection on the westbound side to a derelict portion of the McCoy Road frontage, was finally eliminated in 2002 as part of the Goldenrod Road extension project. The break in the frontage allowing eastbound traffic to cross over to McCoy Road at that point had been closed about a decade before during a resurfacing project. At that point, the Bee Line became completely limited-access from I-4 to SR 401.

In 2003, a new interchange was completed at George J. King Blvd at Port Canaveral, extending the freeway beyond SR 401. While SR 528 officially ends at SR 401, signage continues it along SR A1A to the new interchange at the city limits of Cape Canaveral.

Between 2003 and 2011, the Bennett Causeway's eastbound bridge over the Indian River Lagoon was replaced.

The name of the entire road, except between US 1 and SR 3 (where it is the Emory L. Bennett Causeway), was officially designated as the Martin Andersen Beachline Expressway by the 2005 Florida Legislature. This was done after lobbying by Brevard County, which wanted the shortest route to the Atlantic Ocean from the Orlando area designated as such. An organization representing businesses on the Space Coast has put up billboards calling it "Orlando's closest beach".

During 2006 construction began on a redesigned interchange with SR 436 at the entrance to Orlando International Airport. It was completed in early 2008. A new flyover ramp was built from the Beachline westbound into the airport, eliminating the weaving of cars entering and leaving the airport from/to the Beachline. The mainline toll plazas east and west of the airport remain subject to traffic congestion because of the high percentage of tourists at those plazas who must pay with cash since they don't have access to SunPass, E-Pass or other acceptable electronic toll collection transponders.

The interchange at exit 13 (SR 15) was reconstructed between September 2007 and July 2009, which expanded the interchange ramps and replaced the old bridges with wider ones, and did not eliminate free movement that exists between that exit and exit 11 (SR 436).

In May 2007, the FTE began Phase I of a project to widen the Beachline West. It encompasses the reconstruction of the mainline toll plaza located near milepost 5, which is now complete. The new mainline toll plaza features two electronic (E-pass/SunPass) at-speed express lanes in each direction in the middle of the roadway (with capability to add another when the roadway proper is widened), and four staffed lanes in each direction to accommodate cash customers. The OOCEA had a similar reconstruction of the Beachline main toll plaza just east of the Greeneway between January 2008 and July 2009.

In June 2008, a $49 million (equivalent to $71.8 million in 2025) project to widen the Beachline from the Turnpike to McCoy Road to four lanes in each direction began. Improvements include widening the existing bridge structures at US 441, Landstreet Road, CSX Transportation, CSX Taft Yard, Orange Avenue and McCoy Road, with a new bridge being constructed for the access ramp over CSX.

In 2011, an accident involving an exploding fuel truck destroyed the overpass at SR 3. Traffic was forced to exit the highway around the damage. The overpass was replaced, high priority, within 30 days, for $2.2 million (equivalent to $3.1 million in 2025).

Sightseers wishing to view the final launch of the Space Shuttle Discovery in 2011, caused a 40-mile (64 km) backup from Cape Canaveral.

On March 19, 2012, the Beachline Dallas Boulevard Toll Plaza went into service, in between the Dallas Boulevard and SR 520 interchanges, with a toll of $0.75, ending the previous free movement section of the expressway. This also dropped the previous toll of the Beachline Main Toll Plaza to $0.75, from $1.00 previously. The expressway remains toll-free east of the SR-520 exit to Cape Canaveral.

On July 1, 2014, the Beachline East Expressway segment (SR 520 to US 1/SR A1A) was transferred from FDOT to Florida's Turnpike Enterprise.

East of the GreeneWay, a new interchange at Innovation Way opened on March 5, 2018.

On September 1, 2018, CFX started accepting E-ZPass on the portions of the Beachline that it manages citing some 35 million out of state visitors that use E-ZPass tolling devices. The westernmost few miles of the Beachline, operated by FTE, became compatible with E-ZPass in 2021.

The Turnpike began a massive widening project between I-4 and the Turnpike mainline in fiscal year 2016 to include two express lanes in each direction. The project was completed July 2019.

The Cocoa to Orlando segment of Brightline's rail line between Miami and Orlando was built along the Beachline Expressway. The line began operation on this section in September 2023.

== Exit list ==
County	Location	mi	km	Exit	Destinations	Notes
Orange	Williamsburg	0.000	0.000	0	I-4 – Orlando, Tampa	Exit 72 (I-4); to Disney World and Universal Orlando
Orange	Williamsburg	0.855	1.376	1	International Drive	Serves SeaWorld & Aquatica
Orange	Williamsburg	1.904	3.064	2	Universal Boulevard/Orangewood Boulevard	Serves Orange County Convention Center
Orange	Williamsburg–Orlando line	3.120	5.021	3	CR 423 (John Young Parkway)	Signed as exits 3A (south) and 3B (north) eastbound
Orange	Williamsburg–Orlando line	4.299	6.919	4	Florida's Turnpike / US 17 / US 92 / US 441	Exit 254 (Florida's Turnpike)
Orange	Orlando	5.5	8.9		La Quinta Drive	Future westbound exit only under design; eastbound entrance via Gills Drive; construction slated for Q1 2028; serves The Florida Mall
Orange	Orlando	6.0	9.7	Beachline West Toll Plaza		
Orange	Belle Isle–Orlando line	8.143	13.105	8	Jetport Drive / CR 527 (Orange Avenue)	Eastbound exit only; transition from FTE to CFX maintenance; Access to CR 530 Boggy Creek Road
Orange	Belle Isle–Orlando line	8.143	13.105	8	SR 482 west (McCoy Road)	Tolled westbound exit and eastbound entrance; no eastbound exit; Access to CR 530 Boggy Creek Road
Orange	Orlando	9.225	14.846	9	Tradeport Drive/Conway Road	Tolled westbound exit and eastbound entrance
Orange	Orlando	10.734	17.275	11	SR 436 north (Semoran Boulevard) – Int’l Airport	Formerly signed SR 436 Exit 1
Orange	Orlando	12.085	19.449	12	Goldenrod Road	Goldenrod Road is tolled; Unsigned SR 551
Orange	Orlando	13.448	21.642	13	SR 15 (Narcoossee Road)	
Orange	Orlando	15.536	25.003	16	SR 417 – Tampa, Orlando	Exit 26 (SR 417); to University of Central Florida and Orlando Sanford International Airport
Orange		16.8	27.0	Beachline Mainline Toll Plaza		
Orange		19.759	31.799	19	Sunbridge Parkway/Innovation Way	Tolled westbound exit and eastbound entrance; formerly exit 20; opened March 2018
Orange		19.759	31.799	20	International Corporate Park Boulevard	Former interchange; Replaced by Exit 19 Sunbridge Parkway/Innovation Way
Orange	Wedgefield	23.783	38.275	24	Dallas Boulevard	Tolled interchange; eastbound exit and westbound entrance
Orange	Wedgefield	26.0	41.8	Dallas Mainline Toll Plaza		
Orange		30.844	49.639	31	SR 520	Tolled westbound exit and eastbound entrance; transition from CFX to FTE maintenance. End of tollway.
Brevard		36.975	59.505	37	SR 407 to I-95 north – Kennedy Space Center, Titusville	Eastbound exit and westbound entrance; Spur route under FTE maintenance
Brevard	Cocoa	41.728	67.155	42	I-95 – Miami, Daytona Beach	Signed as exits 42A (south) and 42B (north); Exit 205 (I-95)
Brevard	Cocoa	45.280	72.871	45	SR 524 west / Industry Road / SR 501 south (Clearlake Road)	Signed as exits 45A (SR 524; Clearlake Road) and 45B (Industry Road) westbound; Eastern terminus of SR 524; Northern terminus of Clearlake Road (SR 501)
Brevard	Cocoa	45.956	73.959	46	US 1 – Cocoa, Titusville	Western terminus of SR A1A concurrency; transition from FTE to FDOT maintenance.
Brevard	Cocoa	46.843– 47.278	75.387– 76.087	Bennett Causeway over the Indian River		
Brevard	Merritt Island	48.842	78.604	49	SR 3 – Merritt Island, Kennedy Space Center	
Brevard	Merritt Island	51.405	82.728	52	Banana River Drive	
Brevard	Merritt Island	52.359– 52.571	84.264– 84.605	Bennett Causeway over the Banana River		
Brevard	Cape Canaveral	53.323	85.815	54A	SR 401 north – Cape Canaveral Space Force Station, Port Canaveral	Southern terminus of SR 401; Port Canaveral exit for A Cruise Terminals 4-10 and North Cargo Piers
Brevard	Cape Canaveral	53.343	85.847	54B	George King Boulevard – Jetty Park, Port Canaveral	Port Canaveral exit for B Cruise Terminals 1-3 and South Cargo Piers
Brevard	Cape Canaveral	53.499	86.098		SR A1A south – Port Canaveral, Cape Canaveral, Cocoa Beach	SR A1A continues south
1.000 mi = 1.609 km; 1.000 km = 0.621 mi: Concurrency terminus; Electronic toll collection; Incomplete access
