= Florida State Road 401 =

State highway in Florida, United States

State Road 401

Route information
- Maintained by FDOT
- Length: 2.200 mi (3.541 km)
- Existed: June 1956–present

Major junctions
- South end: SR A1A / SR 528 near Cape Canaveral
- North end: Cape Canaveral Space Force Station

Location
- Country: United States
- State: Florida
- Counties: Brevard

Highway system
- Florida State Highway System; Interstate; US; State; Former; Pre‑1945; Toll; Scenic
← SR 400	→ SR 404

State Road 401 (SR 401) is a four-lane highway extending from a southern terminus at a trumpet interchange with the Martin Andersen Beachline Expressway (formerly the Bee Line Expressway) and SR A1A to a northern terminus of the south gate of Cape Canaveral Space Force Station near Cape Canaveral. It is one of the shortest signed roads in the State of Florida. The route designation was established in June 1956.

== Route description ==
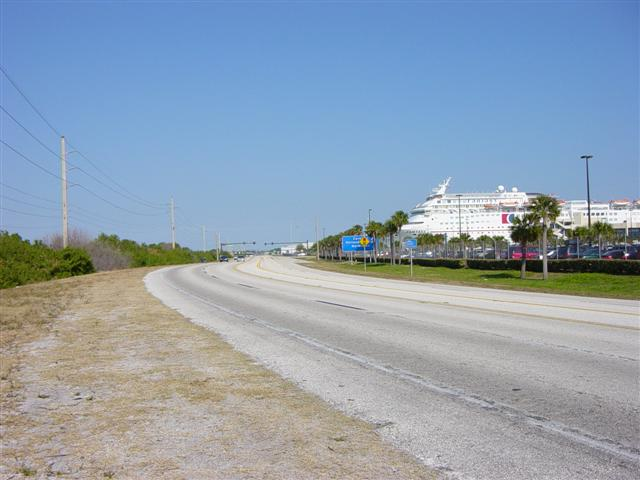
SR 401 near Cruise Docking Ports

While the highway continues beyond the station gate (as Samuel C. Phillips Parkway) to the launch pads of the Kennedy Space Center, the state designation no longer does, as civilians and most military personnel not assigned to the station are generally not permitted beyond the gate.

== History ==
Before the construction of the Kennedy Space Center and Cape Canaveral SFS, the current SR 401 was a segment of SR A1A that extended from Fort Pierce to Playalinda Beach; afterwards, but before the completion of the Bee Line, SR A1A continued northward along Atlantic Avenue into Cape Canaveral, then turning westward onto George King Boulevard and then northward onto (present-day) Samuel C. Phillips Parkway and ending at the station's gate. When the Bee Line's eastern extension was opened to traffic in June 1956, SR A1A was shifted over to Astronaut Boulevard and the new toll road, and the former alignment was given the SR 401 designation (with SR 401 having its northern terminus at an intersection with SR 405 and the then-SR 402 in Cape Canaveral AFS). The section of SR 401 passing through the City of Cape Canaveral eventually lost its route signs and designation (becoming County Road 401 in the process), resulting in the current, much-shortened configuration of SR 401.

== Major intersections ==
The entire route is in Cape Canaveral, Brevard County.

mi	km	Destinations	Notes
0.000	0.000	SR A1A / SR 528 to I-95 – International Airport, Orlando, Port Canaveral B Cruise Terminals / South Cargo Piers, Cocoa Beach	SR 528 exit 54A
0.32	0.51	State Road 401 Bridge over Canaveral Barge Canal	
0.87	1.40	Port Canaveral A Cruise Terminals 8 & 10 (Disney, Royal Caribbean)	interchange; northbound exit and southbound entrance
1.251	2.013	Charles M. Rowland Drive - Port Canaveral A Cruise Terminals 5 & 6 (Carnival, Norwegian)	
1.647	2.651	Grouper Road - Port Canaveral North Cargo Piers	
2.200	3.541	Cape Canaveral Space Force Station, Naval Ordnance Test Unit	
1.000 mi = 1.609 km; 1.000 km = 0.621 mi
