= Innovation Way =

- Location: Orlando, Florida, United States
- Proposer: Orange County Board of County Commissioners
- Project website: Innovation Way: Economic development corridor
- Status: Under Construction
- Type: Industrial/Technology
- Cost estimate (low): $48,924,760.00
- Start date: March, 2006
- Completion date: N/A
- Stakeholders: Suburban Land Reserve, Inc.
- Supporters: University of Central Florida

The Innovation Way Corridor is a development area planned for Orlando, Florida. The planned corridor is to stretch south from the University of Central Florida to International Corporate Park, then West towards the Lake Nona area and finally ending at the Orlando International Airport. At the heart of this development plan is the expansion and extension of Alafaya Trail (SR 434) south from Avalon Park to SR 528 running between the county landfill and the OUC Curtis H. Stanton Energy Center, then continuing through International Corporate Park before it curves west towards the Lake Nona area and the airport. The entire corridor is planned to be approximately 17 miles (27 km) long. The heart of the planned project is to create a technological and business corridor linking the University of Central Florida to the Orlando International Airport.

== Development ==
=== Phase 1 ===
Phase I of the Innovation Way project is the extension of Alafaya Trail from Avalon Park to SR 528. The project as designed will include a 4-lane roadway complete with sidewalks and an on-road bike path and will cover a total distance of 4.81 miles (7.74 km). The total projected cost is $30,098,953.25 and is set to begin in August 2006 with a completion date of December 2008. Phase 1 has been completed just under 1.5 years over schedule

=== Phase 2 ===
Constructed approximately one-half mile north of SR 528, to Monument Parkway, and one mile south of SR 528. It will tie in with a re-aligned section of Aerospace Parkway. This included a new alignment of Innovation Way over SR 528 and five new ramps to accommodate traffic movements to and from SR 528. This project also involved the removal of the existing SR 528/International Corporate Park Boulevard interchange. Construction on the $62 million project began in mid 2016 and finished in mid 2018.

=== Phase 3 and beyond ===
To further improve connectivity to State Road 528 and to accommodate the further development of the Innovation Way Corridor, a new interchange between SR 528 and Innovation Way is in the works. Final design began in June 2021, and will be in general accordance with the Roadway Conceptual Analysis completed in 2015. This project will require additional right-of-way for roadway and storm water improvements during Construction from Wewahootee Road to John Wycliff Boulevard as a four-lane divided roadway. A shared-used path is located on both the north and south side of the roadway. The project will incorporate drainage improvements, lighting, and landscaping along the roadway corridor.

== Project difficulties ==
=== International Corporate Park ===
A key cornerstone to the Innovation Way plan was to bring the UCF Medical Institute and the Burnham Institute to the International Corporate Park development, but both of those facilities have decided to move closer to the Lake Nona area. Due to the loss of these two facilities, the developers of the International Corporate Park have floated the idea that warehouses and corporate distribution centers would generate more profit than High Tech jobs, 3,500 homes, and town center, as originally planned. The International Corporate Park area is already zoned for 20,000,000 square feet (1,860,000 m^{2}) of industrial warehouses, which according to the developers would now be much more profitable than building the residential sections of the plan in a declining housing market. In late November 2006 the International Corporate Park developers sent a letter to Orange County canceling a planned meeting on how to move forward with the Innovation Way plans and they have claimed there is a waiting list of industrial buyers to purchase warehouse space on their property.

In March 2006 a public/private agreement was approved between the Orange County Board of County Commissioners, Orlando-Orange County Expressway Authority (OOCEA) and the developers of the International Corporate Park (ICP). Then, the property owned by ICP went through a change in ownership. The new owner, Suburban Land Reserve, Inc. (SLR) is working on a new agreement between Orange County Board of County Commissioners and the Orlando-Orange County Expressway Authority.

=== Orlando-Orange County Expressway Authority (now Central Florida Expressway Authority (CFX)) ===
In mid-2006 the Orlando-Orange County Expressway Authority canceled funding to an interchange on SR 528 which would have connected to the Innovation Way developments. The Expressway Authority has suggested toll increases to pay for this and other projects but has been unable to do so due to recent scandals and inconsistencies with the agency's handling of toll revenue. In 2014 OOCEA was disbanded and reorganized into the new Central Florida Expressway Authority which cleared the way for Innovation Way to continue infrastructure development.

== See also ==
- Avalon Park, Florida
- Orange County, Florida
- University of Central Florida
- Central Florida Research Park
- Orlando International Airport
