= Florida State Road 3 =

State highway in Florida, United States

State Road 3
- SR 3 highlighted in red

Route information
- Maintained by FDOT
- Length: 11.265 mi (18.129 km)
- Existed: 1945 renumbering (definition)–present

Major junctions
- South end: SR 520 in Merritt Island
- SR 528 / SR A1A in Merritt Island
- North end: SR 321 in Kennedy Space Center

Location
- Country: United States
- State: Florida
- Counties: Brevard

Highway system
- Florida State Highway System; Interstate; US; State; Former; Pre‑1945; Toll; Scenic
← SR 2	→ I-4

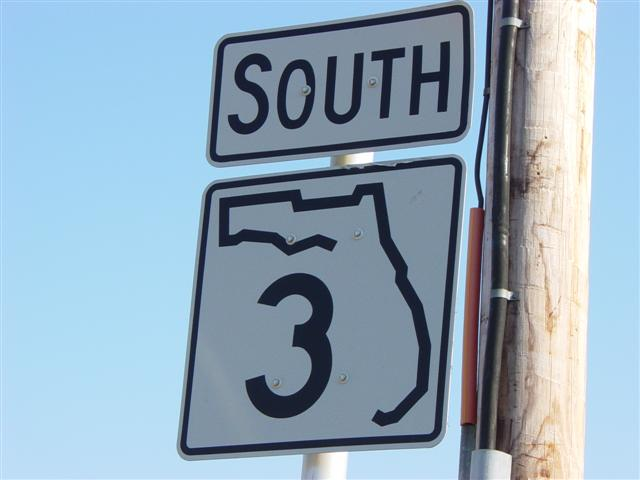
Sign for SR 3 on Merritt Island

State Road 3 (SR 3), known locally as both North Courtenay Parkway and North Kennedy Parkway is a north–south road located entirely on Merritt Island, serving as the southern access for the Kennedy Space Center near Cape Canaveral, Florida. The shortest of the one-digit Florida State Roads, its southern terminus is an intersection with SR 520 on Merritt Island, east of Cocoa.

== Route description ==
SR 3, also known as North Courtenay Parkway, runs from SR 520 north through Merritt Island and into very rural areas before previously terminating at the Kennedy Space Center property line; in 2025 it was extended north to a junction with Florida State Road 321 at Space Commerce Way.

The Florida Department of Transportation annual average daily traffic (AADT) numbers for 2012 show an average of 26,000 vehicles just north of SR 520, increasing to 29,000 just south of SR 528/SR A1A, then decreasing to 25,500 just north of its crossing with those two roads, and further decreasing to 21,500, finally halving to 12,600 as the road approaches the turn to the north-east and its northern terminus.

== History ==
Not one inch of the original alignment of SR 3 is in the current route. Until the opening of the Emory L. Bennett Causeway in June 1956, the route to KSC was signed SR A1A as A1A was routed across the Banana River on the Merritt Island Causeway (SR 520) – and was, in fact, cosigned with SR 520 – and then northward along North Tropical Trail through Kennedy Space Center to an intersection with the former SR 402 (now County Road 402) near the shore of Mosquito Lagoon in the (present-day) Merritt Island National Wildlife Refuge near Titusville.

In the meantime, SR 3 extended along the length of Tropical Trail from US 1 near Oak Hill to the southern tip of Merritt Island, where it crosses the Banana River on the Mathers Bridge (a swing span drawbridge) before turning south on South Patrick Drive (present day SR 513) and crossing the Indian River back to the mainland on the Eau Gallie Causeway (present day SR 518) and terminating at U.S. Route 1 (SR 5) in Melbourne. Between then-SR 402 and SR 520, SR 3 was cosigned with SR A1A.

The openings of the Emory L. Bennett Causeway and the Pineda Causeway in 1971 triggered a massive transformation of SR 3. The former causeway shifted SR A1A to the north (to the newly extended Bee Line Expressway) as SR 3 was realigned to cover North Courtenay Parkway and provide the access to the Kennedy Space Center (the segment north of KSC lost its SR 3 and A1A signs); the latter causeway prompted the establishment of South Patrick Drive as the primary southern access to Patrick Space Force Base as SR 513.

In 1976, the Florida Department of Transportation added a "C-" prefix to the signs on the stretch south of SR 520 and started the transition from State Road 3 to County Road 3.

Courtenay Parkway eventually was extended past SR 520 beyond the Merritt Island Airport to the historic community of Georgiana, where it meets up with the older South Tropical Trail, however this is a county facility and does not carry the state road designation. The last phase was completed in the late 1980s.

== Major intersections ==
The entire route is in Merritt Island, Brevard County.

mi	km	Destinations	Notes
0.000	0.000	SR 520 – Cocoa, Cocoa Beach	Southern terminus of state maintenance
3.354	5.398	SR 528 / SR A1A – Cape Canaveral, Port Canaveral, Cocoa Beach, Orlando, Cocoa, Titusville	SR 528 exit 49
3.52	5.66	Christa McAuliffe Bridge over Canaveral Barge Canal	
9.755	15.699	Kennedy Space Center	
11.265	18.129	SR 321 – KSC Visitors Complex	Northern terminus of state maintenance
1.000 mi = 1.609 km; 1.000 km = 0.621 mi
