= 1945 Florida State Road renumbering =

Highway renumbering in Florida, US

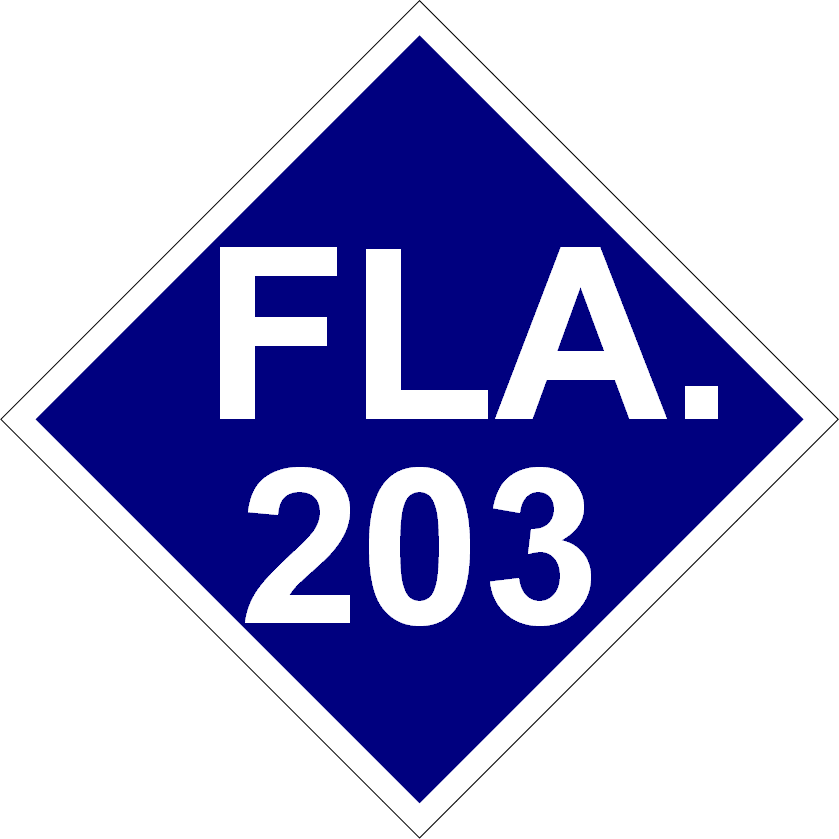
- Original State Road shield

System information
- Formed: 1926

Highway names
- US Highways: US nn
- State: State Road nn

System links
- Florida State Highway System; Interstate; US; State; Former; Pre‑1945; Toll; Scenic

This article is part of the highway renumbering series.
Alabama	1928, 1957
Arkansas	1926
California	1964
Colorado	1953, 1968
Connecticut	1932, 1963
Florida	1945
Indiana	1926
Iowa	1926, 1969
Louisiana	1955
Maine	1933
Massachusetts	1933
Minnesota	1934
Missouri	1926
Montana	1932
Nebraska	1926
Nevada	1976
New Jersey	1927, 1953
New Mexico	1926, 1988
New York	1927, 1930
North Carolina	1934, 1937, 1940, 1961
North Dakota	1926
Ohio	1923, 1927, 1962
Pennsylvania	1928, 1961
Puerto Rico	1953
South Carolina	1928, 1937
South Dakota	1927, 1975
Tennessee	1983
Texas	1939, 1990
Utah	1962, 1977
Virginia	1923, 1928, 1933, 1940, 1958
Washington	1964
Wisconsin	1926
Wyoming	1927

On June 11, 1945, Florida's state roads were renumbered. The old system numbered routes in the order they were legislated, while the new system used a grid.

New designation	Old designation(s)
1 (Note: State Road 1 would be renumbered State Road A1A in 1946 to avoid confusion with U.S. Route 1.)	182 140 178; 177 140 305; 25; 196 176 200 140; 140 224 -- 332 559 162; 140 559 140 252 273 140; 140; 21; 468; 140
2	165, 123, 6, 150, 90
3	101, 219, 119A
4	62
5	4A, 4, 3
6	116, 2, 116E
7	149, 199
10	1 -- 537, 1A, 1, 76, 1
10 Alt.	1
11	134, 28
12	12, 1, 58, 352
13	189, 14, 47
14	-- 9
15	143, 194, 29, 2, 3, 4
16	48
17	67, 8
18	236, 2 -- 49, 68
19	55, 261
20	10 500, 5A, 2, 2A, 14, 28
21	80, 68, 139
22	52
23	99, 49
24	13
25	26, 25, 67, 8A, 2
26	14, 267
27	205 --
29	164 --
30	53, 10, 115, 10, 15A, 299
30 Alt.	10C, 10B, 10
31	2
33	85
35	23
37	34
39	5SE, 264, 459
40	16A, 81, 5, 16, 19
41	
42	
43	
44	22, 36, 2, 21, 75
45	
46	44
47	
48	22, 23, 210, 2, 212, 214
49	
50	15, 34, 51, 210, 22, 2, 208, 434, 22, 51, 322
51	
52	210
53	
54	209
55	
57	
59	
60	
61	
62	
63	
64	
65	
66	
67	
68	
69	
70	18A, 18, 8
71	
72	
73	
74	
75	
76	
77	
78	
79	
80	25
81	
82	184
83	
84	
85	33, 54
87	
89	
90	
92	
94	
95	
97	
99	
100	28
101	
104	
105	
107	
108	
109	
111	
115	
117	
119	
125	
127	
129	
131	
135	
136	
141	
145	
146	
148	
149	
151	
155	
157	
159	
161	
164	
165	
166	
167	
169	
171	
173	
175	
177	
179	
181	
183	
185	
187	
189	
191	
193	
196	
197	
200	
201	
204	
205	
206	
207	
208	
209	
210	
211	
212	
214	
215	
216	
217	
218	
219	
220	
221	
224	
225	
227	
228	
229	
230	
231	
234	
235	
236	
237	
238	
239	
240	
241	
245	
247	
249	
250	
251	
255	
257	
259	
261	
265	
267	
268	
269	
270	
271	
274	
275	
276	
277	
278	
279	
285	
290	
291	
294	
295	
296	
297	
298	
305	
308	
309	
310	
314	
315	
316	
318	
325	
326	
328	
329	
331	
335	
336	
337	
339	
340	
341	
345	
347	
349	
351	
354	
355	
357	
358	
359	
360	
361	
363	
364	
365	
366	
367	
368	
369	
370	
371	
373	
375	
376	
377	
379	
381	
382	
383	
384	
385	
386	
387	
388	
389	
390	
394	
395	
397	
399	
402	
405	
406	
409	
410	
415	
418	
419	
420	
425	
426	
430	
431	
434	
435	
436	
437	
438	
439	
445	
448	
450	
455	
459	
464	
466	
468	
469	
470	
471	
475	
478	
480	
484	
485	
488	
490	
491	
494	
495	
500	19, 23, 2, 24
502	
503	
505	
506	
507	
508	
509	
510	
511	
512	
514	
515	
516	
518	
519	
520	
522	
525	
526	
527	
530	
531	
535	
540	
542	
544	
545	
547	
555	
557	
559	
561	
574	
575	210
577	
578	
579	
580	
581	
582	
583	
584	
585	
586	
587	
589	
590	
591	
593	
595	
600	
605	
606	
607	
609	
621	
623	
630	
634	
636	
640	
650	
652	
655	
660	
661	
664	
665	
674	
675	
676	
680	
683	
684	
685	
686	
687	
688	
689	
690	
691	
693	
694	
695	
699	
702	
703	
705	
706	
707	
708	
710	
712	333
714	
715	
716	
717	
720	
731	
760	
761	
764	
765	
767	
770	
771	
775	
776	
777	
780	
781	
782	
785	
789	
802	
804	
805	
806	198
808	
809	
810	
811	
814	
815	
816	
818	
819	
820	
823	
824	
826	
827	
828	
832	
833	
837	
840	
846	
850	276
861	
865	278
867	25
905	
906	
908	
909	
915	
916	
939	
940	
941	
951	

== See also ==
- Florida State Roads
- Pre-1945 Florida State Roads
