= Florida State Road 407 =

Highway in Florida

State Road 407
- Challenger Memorial Parkway

Route information
- Maintained by FTE
- Length: 6.800 mi (10.944 km)

Major junctions
- South end: SR 528 near Titusville
- I-95 in Titusville
- North end: SR 405 in Titusville

Location
- Country: United States
- State: Florida
- Counties: Brevard

Highway system
- Florida State Highway System; Interstate; US; State; Former; Pre‑1945; Toll; Scenic
← SR 406	→ SR 408

State Road 407 (SR 407), known locally as Challenger Memorial Parkway, is a 6.8-mile (10.9 km) spur from SR 528 (Martin Andersen Beachline Expressway) that links to SR 405. By utilizing the SR 407 to SR 405 route, travelers from Central Florida can access the Kennedy Space Center and the city of Titusville.

Some road maps (for example, AAA) show SR 407 between SR 528 and Interstate 95 (I-95) to be a toll road. While no tolls are collected on SR 407 and it is not signed as a toll road, it is impossible to drive on this section without also connecting to or from State Road 528 and paying a toll.

== Route description ==
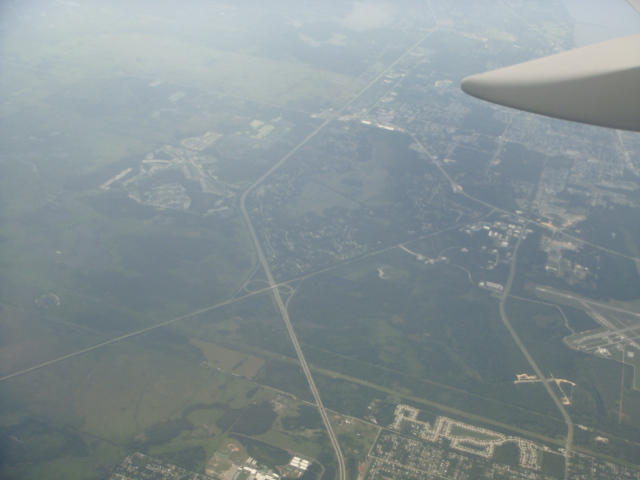
The intersection of SR 407 (thin line) and Interstate 95 (thicker line) seen from the air

State Road 407 was built as a two-lane freeway, meaning that although the highway is expressway-standard, it is merely two lanes with only a dotted or solid yellow line in the middle separating northbound and southbound traffic.

Within the SR 528/SR 407/I-95 triangle is a swampland containing the southern unit of St. Johns National Wildlife Refuge, a popular resting area for migrating birds (the northern unit is two miles (3 km) to the north, adjacent to I-95 and SR 50), and just to the west of the triangle is Tosohatchee Wildlife Management Area, which extends from SR 50 southward to just south of SR 520 in nearby Orange County.

== History ==
The street is named after Space Shuttle Challenger which disintegrated 73 seconds after launch in 1986.

The northern half of the road lost its two-lane freeway qualities when an at-grade intersection was built just south of SR 405, providing a southern exit to Florida's Spaceport Industrial Park and Space Coast Regional Airport.

== Major intersections ==
The entire route is in Brevard County.

Location	mi	km	Destinations	Notes
	0.000	0.000	SR 528 west – International Airport, Orlando	Southern terminus; Exit 37 (SR 528)
Titusville	4.35	7.00	I-95 (SR 9) – Titusville, Cocoa	Exit 212 (I-95); partially at-grade on SR 407
Titusville	5.544	8.922	Shepard Drive	At-grade intersection
Titusville	6.800	10.944	SR 405 to I-95 – Titusville, Kennedy Space Center, Valiant Air Command Warbird Museum, Astronaut and Police Halls of Fame	Northern terminus
1.000 mi = 1.609 km; 1.000 km = 0.621 mi
