= Florida State Road 524 =

State highway in Florida, United States

State Road 524
- SR 524 highlighted in red

Route information
- Maintained by FDOT
- Length: 5.130 mi (8.256 km)

Major junctions
- West end: SR 520 near Cocoa
- I-95 in Cocoa
- East end: SR 528 in Cocoa

Location
- Country: United States
- State: Florida

Highway system
- Florida State Highway System; Interstate; US; State; Former; Pre‑1945; Toll; Scenic
| ← SR 520 | → SR 526 |

State Road 524 (SR 524) is a five-mile-long southwest–northeast street in Cocoa, Florida. It is signed east–west.

The western terminus is an intersection with SR 520 just outside the Cocoa city limits; the eastern terminus is an intersection with SR 501 just south of a SR 528 interchange at Grissom Parkway. Some local maps indicate that it has the name of Emory L. Bennett Causeway (which is also the "local" name for SR 528 as it crosses the Indian River to Cape Canaveral), but the name is rarely mentioned for SR 524.

State Road 524 intersects Interstate 95 (SR 9) with a diamond interchange. The connector is a remnant of the early days of the Bee Line Expressway (now the Martin Andersen Beachline Expressway). When SR 528 was first extended to Cape Canaveral in the 1970s, traffic followed SR 520 and SR 524 to the causeway. Upon completion of the construction of the Bee Line in 1974, the SR 528 designation went onto the new roadway, and the stretch between SR 520 and the Bee Line became SR 524. There is access to Canaveral Groves by Adamson Road, a block away from SR 520.

== Major intersections ==
The entire route is in Brevard County.

| Location | mi | km | Destinations | Notes |
|---|---|---|---|---|
| | 0.000 | 0.000 | SR 520 | |
| Cocoa | 1.66 | 2.67 | I-95 (SR 9) – Jacksonville, Miami | I-95 exit 202 |
| Cocoa | 4.649 | 7.482 | SR 501 south (Clearlake Road) – Brevard Community College, UCF Brevard Campus Solar Energy Center | |
| Cocoa | 4.94 | 7.95 | SR 528 to US 1 – Cape Canaveral, Port Canaveral, Cape Canaveral A.F.S., Orlando | SR 528 exit 45 |
| Cocoa | 5.130 | 8.256 | east end of state maintenance | |
1.000 mi = 1.609 km; 1.000 km = 0.621 mi
