= Florida State Road 10 (1923–1945) =

State Road 10

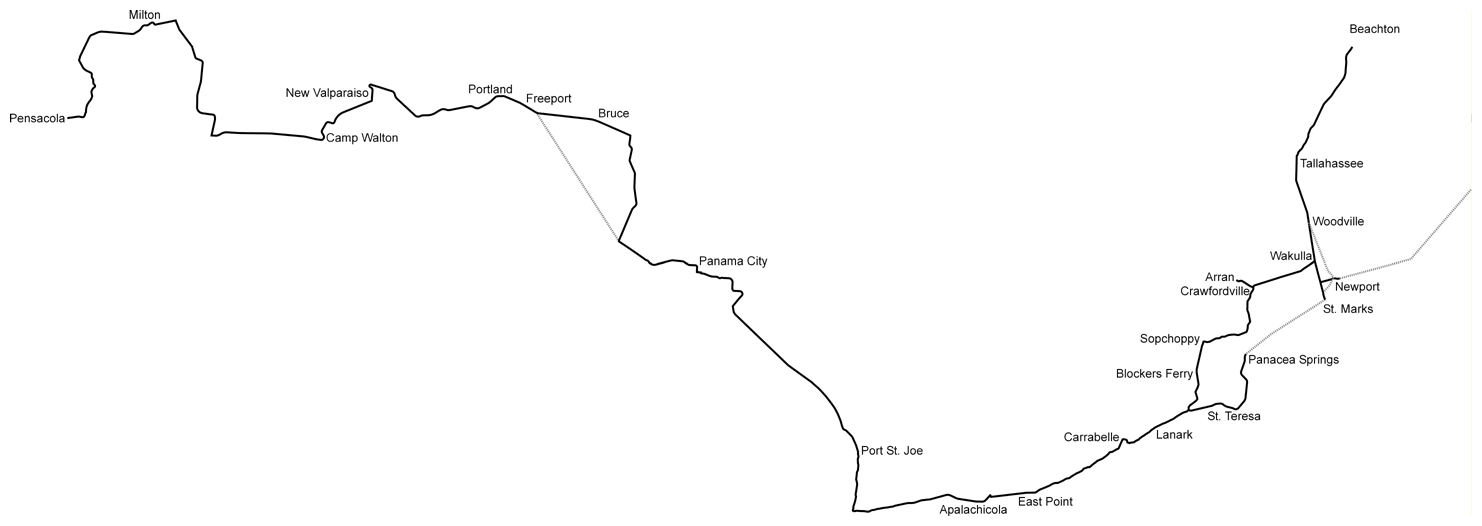

Route information
- Existed: 1923–1945

Location
- Country: United States
- State: Florida

Highway system
- Florida State Highway System; Interstate; US; State; Former; Pre‑1945; Toll; Scenic

State Road 10 was a state highway in Florida from 1923 through 1945, when the majority of numbered highways in the state were renumbered. Today, the route is related to the following routes:

- State Road 61 from Georgia to south of Tallahassee
- State Road 363 from south of Tallahassee to north of St. Marks
- State Road 30 from north of St. Marks to east of Carrabelle
- State Road 30A from east of Carrabelle to Carrabelle
- State Road 30 from Carrabelle to west of Panama City
- State Road 79 from west of Panama City to Ebro
- State Road 20 from Ebro to Valparaiso
- State Road 85 in Valparaiso
- State Road 397 from Valparaiso to Eglin Air Force Base
- unnumbered through Eglin Air Force Base
- State Road 85 from south of Eglin Air Force Base to Fort Walton Beach
- State Road 30 from Fort Walton Beach to Navarre
- State Road 87 from Navarre to Milton
- State Road 10 from Milton to Riverview
- State Road 10A from Riverview to Pensacola
- State Road 365 from Wakulla to Shadeville
- State Road 61 from Shadeville to Medart
- State Road 375 from Medart to Sopchoppy
- State Road 377 from Sopchoppy to west of St. Teresa Beach
- State Road 30 from west of Newport to Newport
- unnumbered northeast from Newport
- State Road 368 from Crawfordville to Arran
