= Florida State Road 520 =

State highway in Florida, United States

State Road 520
- SR 520 highlighted in red

Route information
- Maintained by FDOT
- Length: 34.522 mi (55.558 km)
- Existed: 1945 renumbering (definition)–present

Major junctions
- West end: SR 50 near Bithlo
- I-95 in Cocoa; US 1 in Cocoa; SR 3 in Merritt Island
- East end: SR A1A in Cocoa Beach

Location
- Country: United States
- State: Florida
- Counties: Orange, Brevard

Highway system
- Florida State Highway System; Interstate; US; State; Former; Pre‑1945; Toll; Scenic
← SR 519	→ SR 524

State Road 520 (SR 520) is a 34.5-mile (55.5 km) east–west state highway in central Florida, United States, connecting with SR 50 in the Orlando area with SR A1A in Cocoa Beach.

== Route description ==
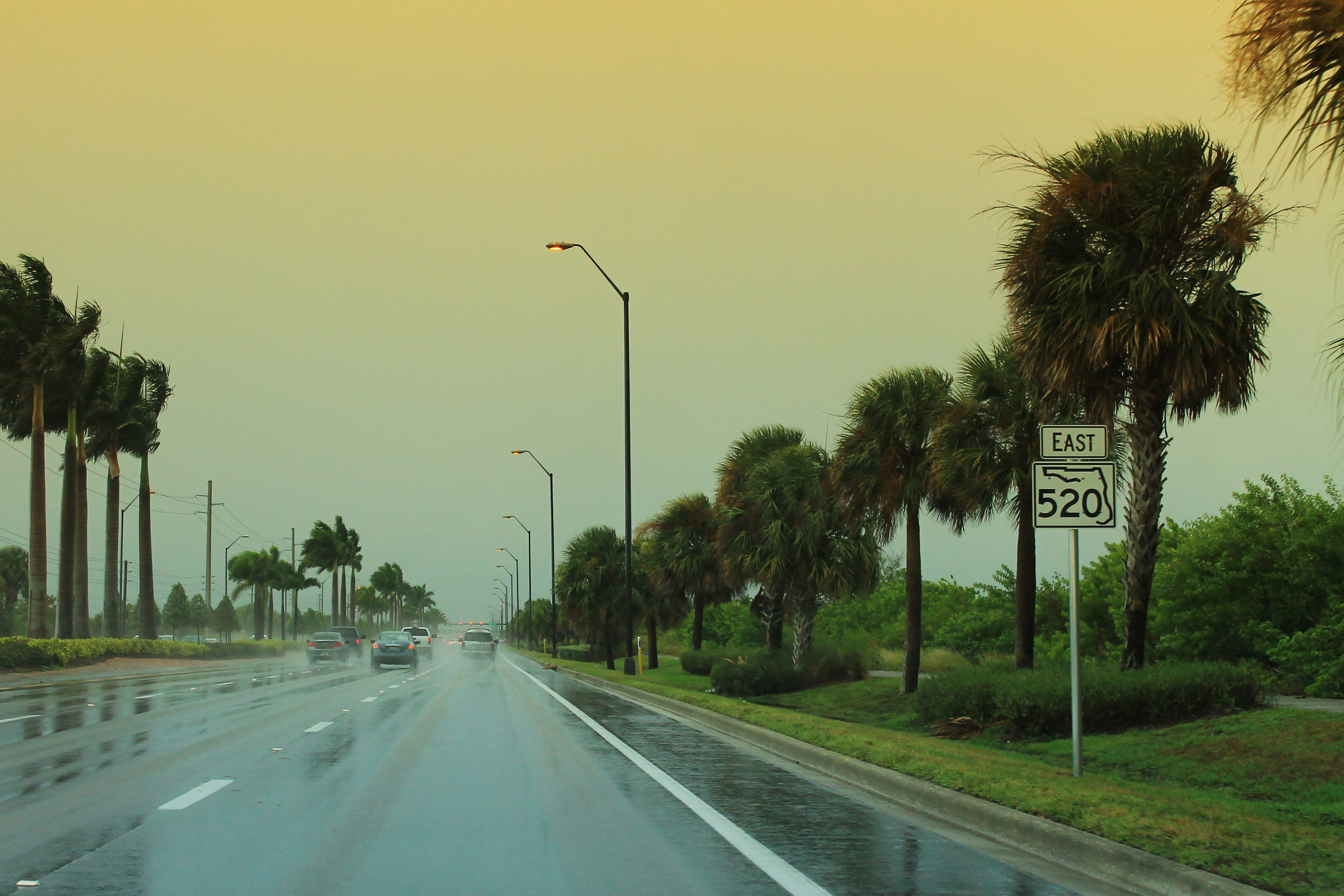
Eastbound on SR 520 in Cocoa Beach on a rainy afternoon.

It runs from SR 50 in Orange County east of Bithlo, southeast across the Beachline Expressway (SR 528). It intersects with County Road 532 (CR 532) before crossing the St. Johns River into Brevard County. In that county it intersects SR 524 (the original approach to the Bennett Causeway) and SR 9 (Interstate 95, I-95), before entering Cocoa and intersecting SR 501, SR 519 and SR 5 (U.S. Route 1, US 1). In Cocoa, SR 520 is known as King Street. It then heads onto the Merritt Island Causeway, a series of bridges crossing the Indian River, Newfound Harbor and the Banana River. Between the Indian River and Newfound Harbor, it crosses through Merritt Island, intersecting SR 3. East of the Banana River, SR 520 runs through Cocoa Beach, and heads towards its eastern terminus at SR A1A.

From 2002 to 2007, the Florida Department of Transportation (FDOT) widened the 22-mile (35 km) stretch to four lanes. The stretch had garnered the nickname "Bloody 520" for the numerous fatalities that had occurred on this stretch.

== History ==
SR 206 was legislated in 1931 to run from pre-1945 SR 4 (US 1) in Cocoa east across the Indian River to Merritt Island. There it would split, with one leg running south to Georgiana and the other north to Courtenay. (In 1937, both of these branches from Merritt Island became part of pre-1945 SR 219, later part of SR 3.)

A 1935 law extended SR 206 west to Orlando along the planned Cocoa–Orlando Highway, which used Lake Road in the Cocoa area. Plans made by the State Road Department would have taken it into Orlando on Curry Ford Road (also defined as part of pre-1945 SR 411 in 1939).

SR 70 was defined in 1933, running from SR 206 at Merritt Island east over the Banana River to pre-1945 SR 140 at Cocoa Beach. A branch would run north along the west side of the Banana River to connect with pre-1945 SR 219 at Orsino.

Finally, SR 418 was defined along the existing Taylor Creek Road, running from pre-1945 SR 22 at Christmas south to the Osceola County line, crossing the planned SR 206 about two-thirds of the way.

By the 1945 renumbering, only the sections of SR 206 and SR 70 east of Cocoa were completed. SR 520 was defined to use sections of SR 418, SR 206 and SR 70. It would begin at SR 50 (former SR 22) near Christmas and run southeast along the general alignment of SR 418, switching to SR 206 where its planned alignment crossed. (SR 418 south of that crossing later became SR 532.) From there it would take SR 206 to Merritt Island, and SR 70 the rest of the way to end at SR 1 (former SR 140).

The section west of Cocoa was built in the 1950s. It used very little of the existing Taylor Creek Road, instead being built further west, joining SR 50 much closer to Bithlo than Christmas. At some point, Alafaya Trail was taken over from SR 50 north past the University of Central Florida to downtown Oviedo. SR 520 was extended west on SR 50 and then north on Alafaya Trail, ending at SR 419 and SR 426 in Oviedo. In the 1980s, SR 520 was truncated back to SR 50, and Alafaya became an extension of SR 434.

== Major intersections ==
County	Location	mi	km	Destinations	Notes
Orange	Bithlo	0.000	0.000	SR 50 – Orlando, Titusville	
Orange		8.89	14.31	SR 528 to I-4 – Cape Canaveral, Cocoa, Titusville, Beaches, International Airport	Exit 31 on SR 528 (Beachline Expressway)
Orange		15.122	24.336	CR 532 (Nova Road) – St. Cloud	
St. Johns River		18.206	29.300	Bridge	
Brevard		21.150	34.038	SR 524 east	Western terminus of SR 524
Brevard	Cocoa	23.09	37.16	I-95 – Miami, Jacksonville	Exit 201 on I-95 (SR 9)
Brevard		25.569	41.149	Clearlake Road (SR 501 north)	Southern terminus of SR 501
Brevard	Cocoa	26.324	42.364	SR 519 south (Fiske Boulevard) – Armory	Northern terminus of SR 519
Brevard	Cocoa	26.933	43.344	US 1 (Cocoa Boulevard) – Titusville, Melbourne	Unsigned SR 5
Brevard	Indian River	27.8	44.7	Merritt Island Causeway	
Brevard	Merritt Island	28.637	46.087	Tropical Trail (CR 3 south)	
Brevard	Merritt Island	28.912	46.529	SR 3 north (Courtenay Parkway)	
Brevard	Banana River	32.1	51.7	Merritt Island Causeway	
Brevard	Cocoa Beach	34.522	55.558	SR A1A – Cape Canaveral Space Force Station, Patrick Space Force Base	
1.000 mi = 1.609 km; 1.000 km = 0.621 mi: Tolled

== Former State Road 520A ==
State Road 520A
- Location: Lake Poinsett–Cocoa
- Length: 0.6 mi (970 m)
- Existed: 2000

Until about 1980, a 0.6-mile-long (0.97 km) spur from SR 520 to Lake Poinsett was designated State Road 520A by FDOT and its predecessor, the State Road Department. Known locally as Lake Poinsett Road, the former SR 520A is the sole access road to Poinsett Groves and Poinsett Shores. The northern end is an intersection with King Street just west of I-95 near Rockledge.
