= Taft, Florida =

Unincorporated area in Florida, US

- Census-designated place
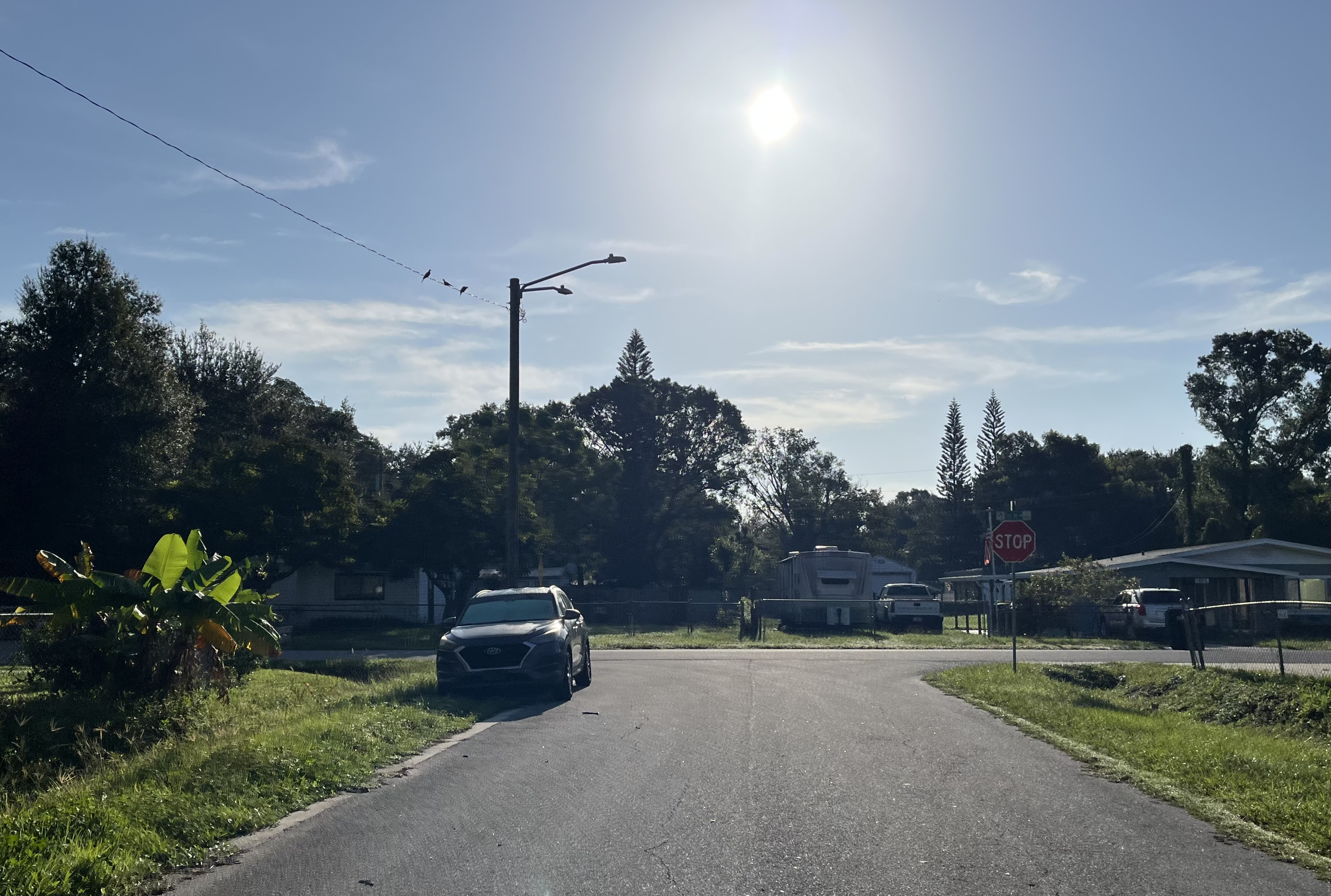
- Street scene in Taft

- Location in Orange County and the state of Florida
- Coordinates: 28°25′44″N 81°22′4″W
- Country: United States
- State: Florida
- County: Orange
- Incorporated (town): 1912
- Unincorporated: August 1, 1933
- Named for: William Howard Taft

Area
  - Total: 0.98 sq mi (2.55 km^{2})
  - Land: 0.98 sq mi (2.55 km^{2})
  - Water: 0 sq mi (0.00 km^{2})
- Elevation: 95 ft (29 m)

Population (2020)
  - Total: 2,221
  - Density: 2,257.3/sq mi (871.54/km^{2})
- Time zone: UTC-5 (Eastern (EST))
  - Summer (DST): UTC-4 (EDT)
- ZIP code: 32824
- Area codes: 407, 689
- FIPS code: 12-70525
- GNIS feature ID: 2402912

Taft is a census-designated place and an unincorporated area in Orange County, Florida, United States. As of the 2020 census, Taft had a population of 2,221. It is part of the Orlando–Kissimmee Metropolitan Statistical Area.

== Geography ==
The communities of Southchase and Meadow Woods are located on the south side of the community, Williamsburg to the west, Sky Lake and Pine Castle are located to the north, and Orlando International Airport is located on the east side.

According to the United States Census Bureau, the CDP has a total area of 2.7 km^{2} (1.0 mi^{2}), of which 2.6 km^{2} (1.0 mi^{2}) is land and 0.1 km^{2} (0.04 mi^{2}) (2.88%) is water.

== Demographics ==
Historical population
Year	Pop.	±%
1915	216	—
1920	259	+19.9%
1925	382	+47.5%
1930	296	−22.5%
2020	2,221	+650.3%
U.S. Decennial Census Florida Department of Agriculture; Source: U.S. Decennial Census

=== 2020 census ===
As of the 2020 census, Taft had a population of 2,221. The median age was 38.2 years. 23.5% of residents were under the age of 18 and 12.8% of residents were 65 years of age or older. For every 100 females there were 107.2 males, and for every 100 females age 18 and over there were 109.5 males age 18 and over.

100.0% of residents lived in urban areas, while 0.0% lived in rural areas.

There were 772 households in Taft, of which 35.1% had children under the age of 18 living in them. Of all households, 41.1% were married-couple households, 25.1% were households with a male householder and no spouse or partner present, and 25.5% were households with a female householder and no spouse or partner present. About 21.2% of all households were made up of individuals and 8.3% had someone living alone who was 65 years of age or older.

There were 837 housing units, of which 7.8% were vacant. The homeowner vacancy rate was 1.5% and the rental vacancy rate was 4.3%.

Racial composition as of the 2020 census
Race	Number	Percent
White	1,050	47.3%
Black or African American	195	8.8%
American Indian and Alaska Native	20	0.9%
Asian	54	2.4%
Native Hawaiian and Other Pacific Islander	4	0.2%
Some other race	378	17.0%
Two or more races	520	23.4%
Hispanic or Latino (of any race)	1,031	46.4%

=== 2000 census ===
As of the census of 2000, there were 1,938 people, 678 households, and 463 families residing in the CDP. The population density was 733.6/km^{2} (1,907.3/mi^{2}). There were 729 housing units at an average density of 275.9/km^{2} (717.5/mi^{2}). The racial makeup of the CDP was 84.88% White, 6.66% African American, 1.08% Native American, 1.70% Asian, 0.36% Pacific Islander, 4.70% from other races, and 0.62% from two or more races. Hispanic or Latino of any race were 15.38% of the population.

There were 678 households, out of which 29.4% had children under the age of 18 living with them, 42.6% were married couples living together, 17.8% had a female householder with no husband present, and 31.6% were non-families. 19.2% of all households were made up of individuals, and 4.7% had someone living alone who was 65 years of age or older. The average household size was 2.86 and the average family size was 3.20.

In the CDP, the population was spread out, with 25.6% under the age of 18, 8.8% from 18 to 24, 32.9% from 25 to 44, 23.6% from 45 to 64, and 9.1% who were 65 years of age or older. The median age was 34 years. For every 100 females, there were 113.4 males. For every 100 females age 18 and over, there were 116.0 males.

The median income for a household in the CDP was $32,500, and the median income for a family was $32,250. Males had a median income of $25,438 versus $25,893 for females. The per capita income for the CDP was $12,331. About 14.8% of families and 14.3% of the population were below the poverty line, including 16.1% of those under age 18 and 8.4% of those age 65 or over.
