= Canaveral Barge Canal =

Canal in Brevard County, Florida, US

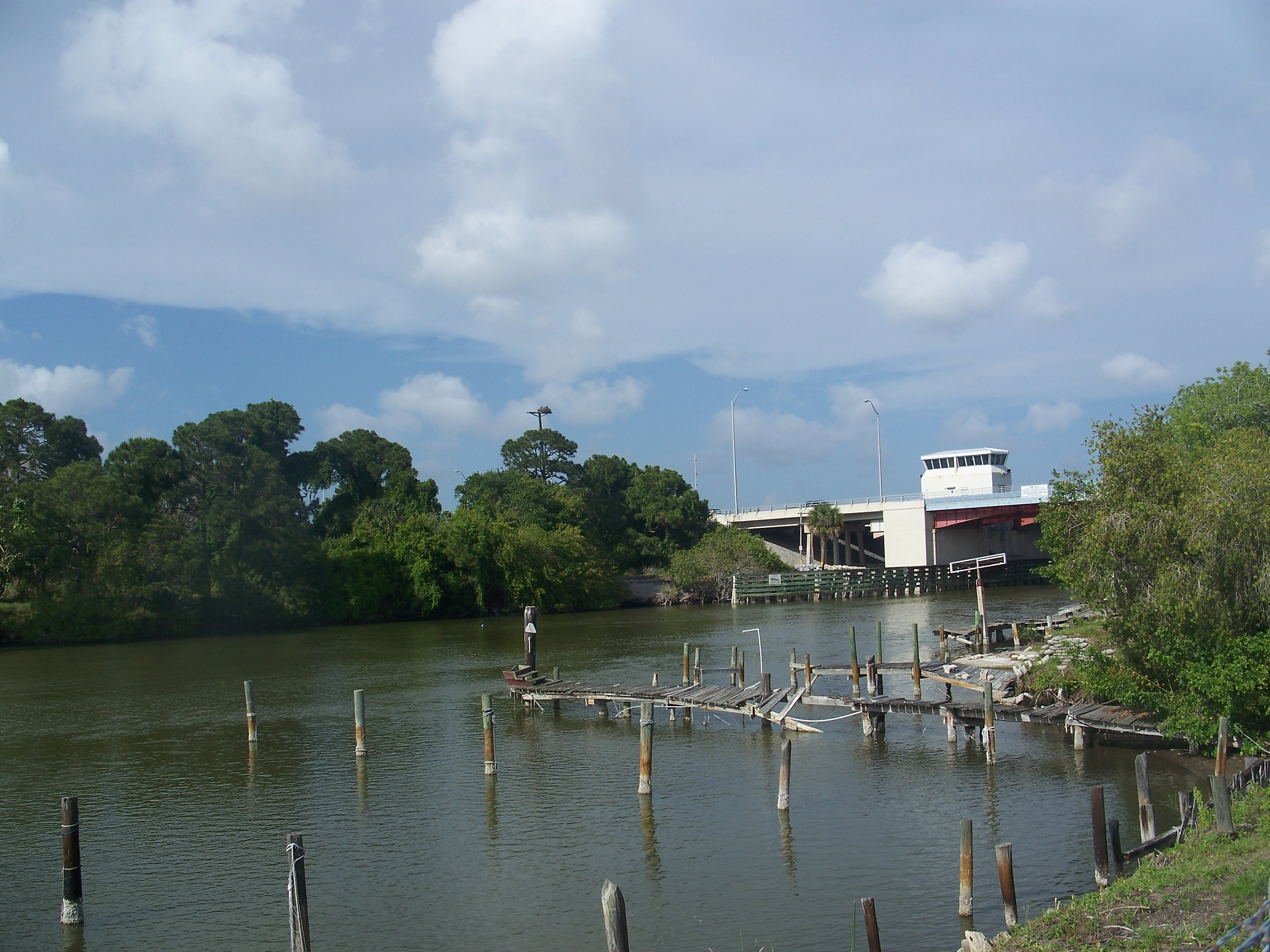
- Barge canal, looking towards the Christa McAuliffe Bridge

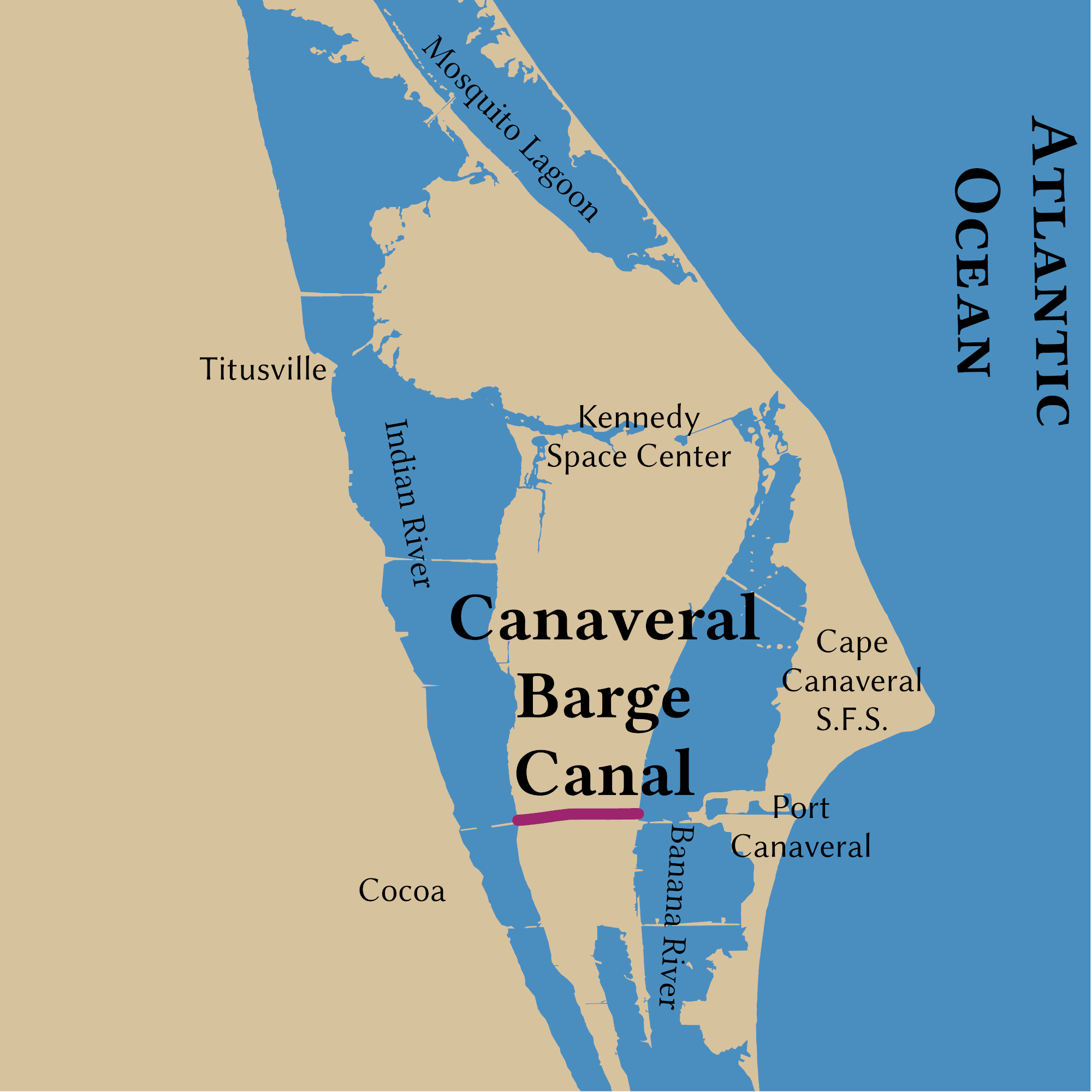
- Location: Brevard County, Florida
- Country: United States
- Coordinates: 28°24′33″N 80°41′37″W

Specifications
- Maximum boat draft: 12 feet (3.7 m)
- Locks: 1
- Total rise: 3–4 feet (0.91–1.22 m)
- Status: Open
- Navigation authority: U.S. Army Corps of Engineers

History
- Date of first use: January 1, 1965

Geography
- Start point: Atlantic Ocean
- End point: Indian River
- Connects to: Banana River, Port Canaveral, Intracoastal Waterway, Sykes Creek

The Canaveral Barge Canal is an active canal in Brevard County, Florida, cutting east-west across northern Merritt Island just south of Cape Canaveral. It connects the Atlantic Ocean and Port Canaveral with the Indian River and wider Indian River Lagoon, part of the Intracoastal Waterway. The canal consists of two segments separated by the Banana River.

The canal was constructed by the U.S. Army Corps of Engineers in 1950, during the initial construction of Port Canaveral to allow the transport of crude oil by barge to two power plants south of Titusville, Florida.

Canaveral Lock, the canal's only lock and the largest navigation lock in Florida, is located on the eastern segment. This was constructed in 1964 It has a rise of 3–4 feet (0.91–1.22 m) and protects Port Canaveral from tidal currents, storm surge, and salt water. The lock is free of charge and takes 20 to 30 minutes for watercraft to traverse. The design was expanded during the planning stage to enable the transport of Saturn rocket stages to NASA's Kennedy Space Center for the Apollo program.

Vessels with drafts up to 12 feet (3.7 m) may use the canal, which was intended for barges but not ships (the adjacent Port Canaveral allows drafts up to 39.5 feet (12.0 m)). The canal is popular with recreational boaters, providing access to Sykes Creek and various marinas. The next-closest passages between the Intracoastal Waterway and the ocean are Ponce de Leon Inlet, 50 miles (80 km) to the north, and Sebastian Inlet, 40 miles (64 km) to the south.

== List of crossings ==
Bridge	Type	Carries	Location	Coordinates
Christa McAuliffe Bridge	Bascule drawbridge	SR 3 / Courtenay Parkway	Merritt Island	28°24′26″N 80°42′24″W
Barge Canal Bridge	Bascule drawbridge	SR 401	Cape Canaveral	28°24′32″N 80°37′55″W

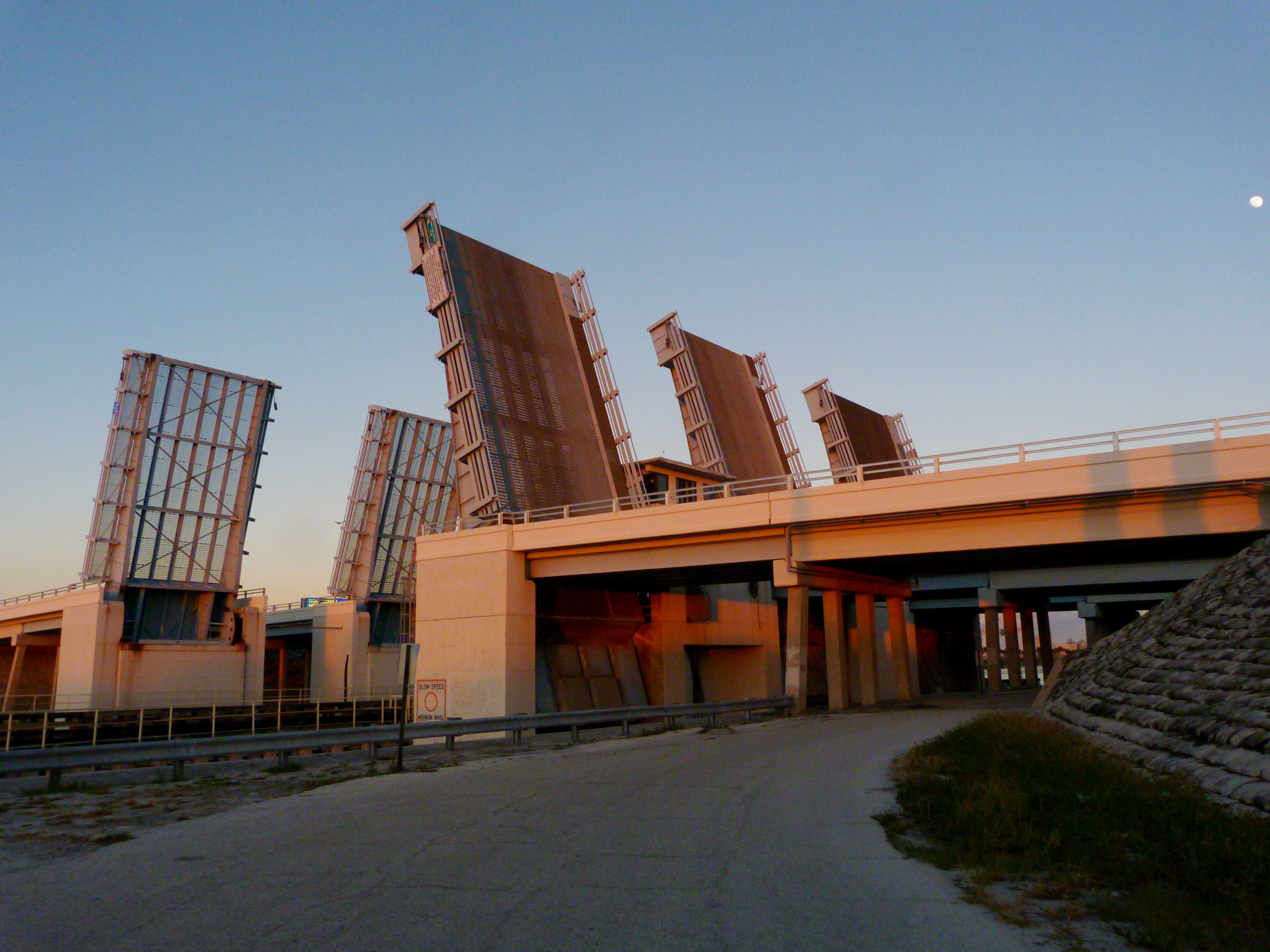
The Barge Canal Bridge is actually three adjacent bridges, each of which includes a bascule draw span.
