= Florida State Road 501 =

State highway in Florida, United States

State Road 501
- Clearlake Road

Route information
- Maintained by FDOT
- Length: 3.358 mi (5.404 km)

Major junctions
- South end: SR 520 near Cocoa
- North end: SR 524 in Cocoa

Location
- Country: United States
- State: Florida

Highway system
- Florida State Highway System; Interstate; US; State; Former; Pre‑1945; Toll; Scenic
← SR 500A	→ SR 507

State Road 501 (SR 501) is a three-mile (5 km) long north–south highway entirely within Cocoa, Florida, in the United States. It southern terminus is an intersection with King Street (SR 520); its northern terminus is an intersection with SR 524 just south of an interchange with State Road 528 and Grissom Parkway. The road is also known as Clearlake Road. Until the mid-1980s, it was State Road 503A.

SR 501 is a commercial artery of Cocoa, with shopping centers on both sides of the street. A campus of Brevard Community College is also located on Clearlake Road.

== Major intersections ==
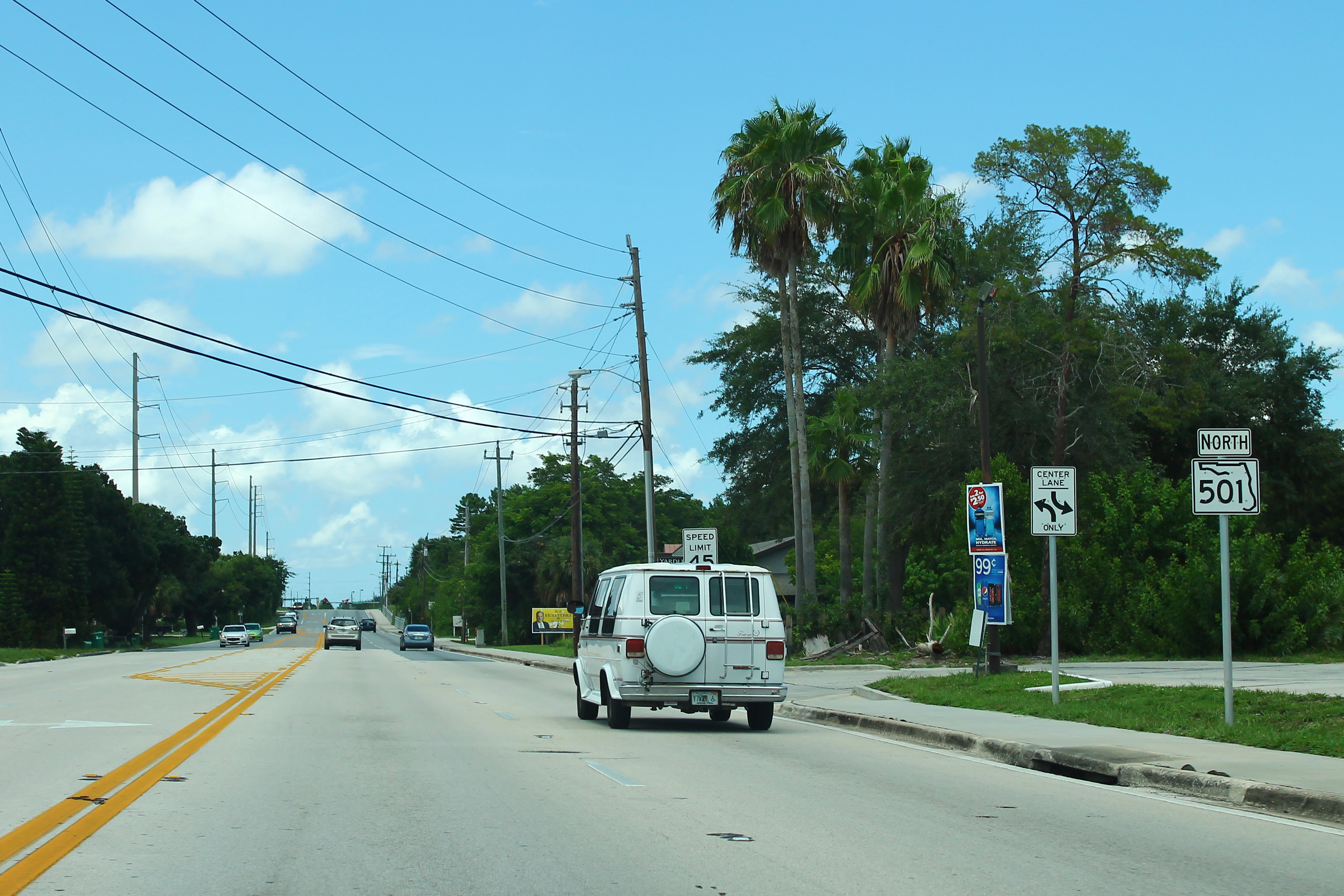
Northbound on SR 501 in Cocoa

The entire route is in Brevard County.

Location	mi	km	Destinations	Notes
	0.000	0.000	SR 520 (King Street)	
Cocoa	1.193	1.920	Dixon Boulevard (CR 503 east)	
Cocoa	3.358	5.404	SR 524 (Industry Road) to SR 528 – Cape Canaveral A.F.S., Port Canaveral	
1.000 mi = 1.609 km; 1.000 km = 0.621 mi
