= Williamsburg, Florida =

Unincorporated area in Florida, US

- Census-designated place
- Location in Orange County and the state of Florida

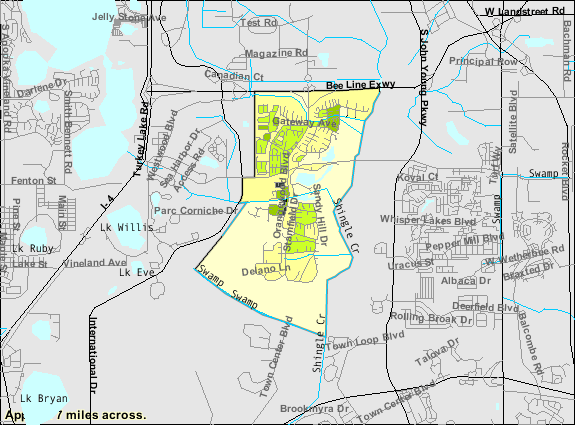
- U.S. Census Bureau map showing CDP boundaries
- Coordinates: 28°24′05″N 81°26′46″W
- Country: United States
- State: Florida
- County: Orange

Area
  - Total: 3.65 sq mi (9.45 km^{2})
  - Land: 3.55 sq mi (9.20 km^{2})
  - Water: 0.097 sq mi (0.25 km^{2})
- Elevation: 85 ft (26 m)

Population (2020)
  - Total: 7,908
  - Density: 2,226.7/sq mi (859.73/km^{2})
- Time zone: UTC-5 (Eastern (EST))
  - Summer (DST): UTC-4 (EDT)
- FIPS code: 12-77735
- GNIS feature ID: 2403029

Williamsburg is a census-designated place (CDP) in Orange County, Florida, United States. As of the 2020 census, Williamsburg had a population of 7,908. It is part of the Orlando–Kissimmee Metropolitan Statistical Area.

== Geography ==
According to the United States Census Bureau, the CDP has a total area of 9.7 km^{2} (3.8 mi^{2}), of which 9.5 km^{2} (3.7 mi^{2}) is land and 0.2 km^{2} (0.1 mi^{2}) (1.87%) is water.

Williamsburg is a large subdivision bounded roughly on the north by the Beachline Expressway, on the south by the Central Florida GreeneWay, on the east by Shingle Creek and on the west by International Drive. The main intersection of the community is at Orangewood Blvd. and Central Florida Parkway.

In the early 2000s, Williamsburg's Homeowners Association worked with the Orange County Board of County Commissioners to ensure that traffic from the Orange County Convention Center did not pass through the interchange between Orangewood Boulevard and the Beachline, which would expand to connect to a southern extension of Universal Boulevard. The result was an interchange that directed a bulk of southbound Universal Boulevard traffic onto the Beachline, with only one lane passing under to connect to Orangewood Boulevard.

== Demographics ==
Historical population
Census	Pop.	Note	%±
2020	7,908		—
U.S. Decennial Census

=== 2020 census ===
As of the 2020 census, Williamsburg had a population of 7,908. The median age was 45.1 years. 15.2% of residents were under the age of 18 and 19.8% of residents were 65 years of age or older. For every 100 females there were 96.5 males, and for every 100 females age 18 and over there were 95.2 males age 18 and over.

100.0% of residents lived in urban areas, while 0.0% lived in rural areas.

There were 3,427 households in Williamsburg, of which 21.6% had children under the age of 18 living in them. Of all households, 43.7% were married-couple households, 19.7% were households with a male householder and no spouse or partner present, and 28.0% were households with a female householder and no spouse or partner present. About 27.7% of all households were made up of individuals and 11.1% had someone living alone who was 65 years of age or older.

There were 3,914 housing units, of which 12.4% were vacant. The homeowner vacancy rate was 1.0% and the rental vacancy rate was 4.8%.

Racial composition as of the 2020 census
Race	Number	Percent
White	4,880	61.7%
Black or African American	358	4.5%
American Indian and Alaska Native	26	0.3%
Asian	634	8.0%
Native Hawaiian and Other Pacific Islander	54	0.7%
Some other race	599	7.6%
Two or more races	1,357	17.2%
Hispanic or Latino (of any race)	2,038	25.8%

=== 2000 census ===
As of the census of 2000, there were 6,736 people, 3,262 households, and 2,035 families residing in the CDP. The population density was 706.7/km^{2} (1,830.4/mi^{2}). There were 3,492 housing units at an average density of 366.4/km^{2} (948.9/mi^{2}). The racial makeup of the CDP was 89.59% White, 1.97% African American, 0.10% Native American, 3.95% Asian, 0.15% Pacific Islander, 2.15% from other races, and 2.08% from two or more races. Hispanic or Latino of any race were 9.47% of the population.

There were 3,262 households, out of which 13.1% had children under the age of 18 living with them, 52.2% were married couples living together, 7.5% had a female householder with no husband present, and 37.6% were non-families. 28.6% of all households were made up of individuals, and 15.5% had someone living alone who was 65 years of age or older. The average household size was 2.06 and the average family size was 2.49.

In the CDP, the population was spread out, with 10.7% under the age of 18, 4.4% from 18 to 24, 27.7% from 25 to 44, 24.0% from 45 to 64, and 33.3% who were 65 years of age or older. The median age was 51 years. For every 100 females, there were 89.7 males. For every 100 females age 18 and over, there were 88.3 males.

The median income for a household in the CDP was $46,460, and the median income for a family was $51,791. Males had a median income of $37,029 versus $27,337 for females. The per capita income for the CDP was $26,096. About 2.0% of families and 4.0% of the population were below the poverty line, including 2.9% of those under age 18 and 3.9% of those age 65 or over.
