= Florida State Road 4 (1923–1945) =

State Road 4

Route information
- Existed: 1923–1945

Location
- Country: United States
- State: Florida

Highway system
- Florida State Highway System; Interstate; US; State; Former; Pre‑1945; Toll; Scenic

State Road 4 was a state highway in Florida from 1923 through 1945, when the majority of numbered highways in the state were renumbered. Today, the route is related to the following routes (which would later be related to U.S. Route 1):

- State Road 5 from Miami to Jacksonville
- State Road 15 from Jacksonville to Georgia
