= Avalon Park, Florida =

- Neighborhood
- Motto: Live, Learn, Work, and Play
- Interactive map of Avalon Park, Florida
- Coordinates: 28°30′57.76″N 81°9′13.70″W
- Country: United States
- State: Florida
- County: Orange
- Established: 1995

Population
  - Estimate: 14,219
- Time zone: UTC-5 (Eastern (EST))
  - Summer (DST): UTC-4 (EDT)
- Postal code: 32828

Avalon Park is a neighborhood community located in unincorporated Orange County, Florida, United States which is built on the principle of New Urbanism, also known as Neo-Traditionalism.

== Community ==
Avalon Park covers 1,860 acres (7.5 km^{2}) of land in southeastern Orange County, east of Alafaya Trail and south of State Road 50. Avalon Park is one of several New Urban communities in the Orlando metro area; other examples include Celebration, Florida and Baldwin Park. It has been described as "urban suburbia," and was planned as a diversified community for mixed income levels. The community is organized in a series of villages surrounding a core Town Center area. Residential development includes a mix of condominiums, apartments, townhomes, and traditional homes.

== Education ==
The Avalon Park community has five elementary schools (Avalon Elementary School, Stone Lakes Elementary School, Timber Lakes Elementary School, Camelot Elementary School, and Castle Creek Elementary School); plus two middle schools (Avalon Middle School and Timber Springs Middle School). The community of Avalon Park is zoned for Timber Creek High School and Orange Technical College - Avalon Campus, which offers vocational training. The University of Central Florida is within 10 mi (16 km) as well.
