= Florida State Road 519 =

State highway in Florida, United States

State Road 519
- SR 519 highlighted in red

Route information
- Maintained by FDOT
- Length: 4.604 mi (7.409 km)

Major junctions
- South end: I-95 in Rockledge
- North end: SR 520 in Cocoa

Location
- Country: United States
- State: Florida

Highway system
- Florida State Highway System; Interstate; US; State; Former; Pre‑1945; Toll; Scenic
← SR 518	→ SR 520

A commercial artery of central Brevard County, State Road 519 (SR 519) is a 4.0-mile-long (6.4 km) north–south highway extending from King Street (SR 520) in Cocoa southward to Barnes Boulevard (County Road 502) and an interchange with Interstate 95 (SR 9) in Rockledge. It is locally known as Fiske Boulevard.

North of King Street, Fiske Boulevard continues on to an intersection with Dixon Boulevard (CR 503), and ends further north within the Cocoa Hills residential subdivision.

South of Barnes Boulevard, Fiske Boulevard becomes Stadium Parkway (also not a designated State or County Road), which serves Space Coast Stadium in the Carl Barger Complex in Viera. The southern end of Stadium Parkway will eventually connect to the northern terminus of the St. Johns Heritage Parkway.

== Major intersections ==
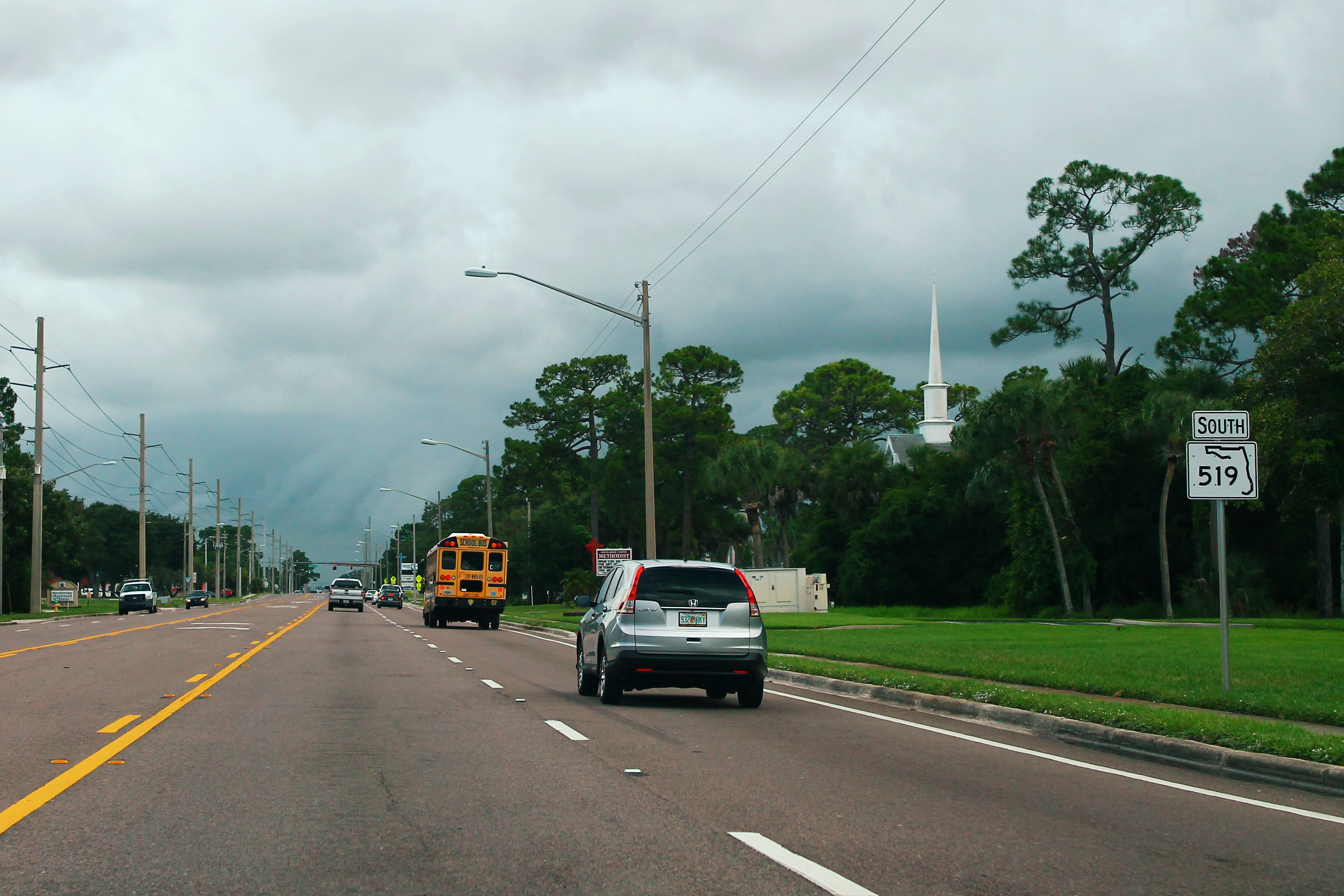
Southbound on Florida State Road 519 in Cocoa, Florida.

The entire route is in Brevard County.

Location	mi	km	Destinations	Notes
	0.000	0.000	south end of state maintenance	
Rockledge	0.24	0.39	I-95 (SR 9)	I-95 exit 195
Rockledge	0.445	0.716	CR 502 east (Barnes Boulevard) to US 1	
Cocoa	4.604	7.409	SR 520 (King Street)	
1.000 mi = 1.609 km; 1.000 km = 0.621 mi
