= Aia (disambiguation) =

Aia is a small town in the province of Gipuzkoa, Spain.

AIA or A.I.A. or Aia may also refer to:

== Aia ==
- Peñas de Aya, small mountain range in Oiartzun, Gipuzkoa
- Aia, current Kutaisi, ancient capital of Colchis
- Aia, another name for Aea (Malis), an ancient town in Greece
- Aia, the collected edition of E. C. Vivian's 1920s novels Fields of Sleep and People of the Darkness
- Saint Aia (died c. 711), Belgian Catholic saint also known as Aye
- Aia (plant), a genus of plants containing a single species, Aia tseui

== Academia ==
- Abstract Intelligent Agent, a generalization and a hypothetical essence of human intelligence
- Archaeological Institute of America
- Arizona Interscholastic Association
- Art Institute of Atlanta, a private fine-art college
- Association for Industrial Archaeology, a body supporting the archaeology of industry in Britain
- Artists' International Association

== Statutes and treaties ==
- Access to Information Act, a Canadian freedom of information act
- Leahy-Smith America Invents Act
- Anglo-Irish Agreement, a 1985 agreement between the governments of Ireland and the UK, aimed at bringing an end to The Troubles
- Anti-Injunction Act, a US federal law

== Aerospace ==
- Aerospace Industries Association
- American International Airways, now known as Kalitta Air
- Avies, an Estonian airline (ICAO code: AIA)

== Airports ==
- Accra International Airport, in Accra, Ghana
- Adelaide International Airport, in Adelaide, Australia
- Alliance Municipal Airport in Alliance, Nebraska, United States (IATA Code: AIA)
- Argyle International Airport in Saint Vincent, Saint Vincent and the Grenadines
- Asunción International Airport, in Asuncion, Paraguay
- Athens International Airport, in Athens, Greece
- Auckland International Airport in Auckland, New Zealand
  - Auckland International Airport Limited (stock symbol AIA)

== Sport and entertainment ==
- Aliens in America, an American comedy TV show
- Arizona Interscholastic Association, an Arizona high school athletics association
- Asociación Iberoamericana de Atletismo, the governing body for the sport of athletics of European, Latin-American, and African countries with Iberian origin and/or Spanish or Portuguese language
- Athletes in Action, an evangelical sports ministry
- Autódromo Internacional do Algarve, a motor-racing track in Portugal

== Business ==
- American Insurance Association
- AIA Group, a Hong Kong insurance and finance corporation
- Amerindo Investment Advisors, a financial-services company
- Annual investment allowance, a type of capital allowance in accounting

== Technology and engineering ==
- Application Integration Architecture, an integration framework marketed by Oracle Corporation
- Atmospheric Imaging Assembly, an instrument that provides imaging of the Sun's corona on the Solar Dynamics Observatory
- Automated Imaging Association
- Authority Information Access
- Automated immunoassay

== Professional bodies and qualifications ==
- Alliance of Independent Authors
- American Institute of Architects
- Associate of the Institute of Actuaries
- Association of International Accountants
- Australian Institute of Architects
- Afghan Interim Administration
- America's Infrastructure Alliance

== Other ==
- Anguilla, from its ISO and FIFA 3-letter country code
- Air Intelligence Agency, the former name of the Air Force Intelligence, Surveillance and Reconnaissance Agency of the United States
- AIA, fictional artificial intelligence from Afraid (film)
- Anti-Imperialist Action Ireland, a revolutionary socialist organisation

== See also ==
- Florida State Road A1A
