= Florida State Road A1A =

State highway in Florida, United States

State Road A1A
- SR A1A highlighted in red

Route information
- Maintained by FDOT
- Length: 338.752 mi (545.168 km)
- Existed: 1945 renumbering (definition)–present
- Tourist routes: A1A Scenic and Historic Coastal Byway

Major junctions
- South end: Bertha Street in Key West
- I-395 / US 1 in Miami; SR 84 in Fort Lauderdale; US 98 / SR 80 in Palm Beach; US 1 in West Palm Beach; SR 60 in Vero Beach; US 192 in Indialantic; US 92 in Daytona Beach; US 1 Bus. in St. Augustine; SR 202 in Jacksonville Beach; US 90 in Jacksonville Beach
- West end: US 1 / US 23 / US 301 / SR 200 in Callahan

Location
- Country: United States
- State: Florida
- Counties: Monroe, Miami-Dade, Broward, Palm Beach, Martin, St. Lucie, Indian River, Brevard, Volusia, Flagler, St. Johns, Duval, Nassau

Highway system
- Florida State Highway System; Interstate; US; State; Former; Pre‑1945; Toll; Scenic
← US 1	→ SR 2

State Road A1A (SR A1A) is a major north–south Florida State Road consisting of seven separate sections running a total of 338.752 miles (545.168 km) along the Atlantic Ocean, from Key West at the southern tip of Florida, to Fernandina Beach, just south of Georgia on Amelia Island, before turning inland to Callahan. It is the main road through most oceanfront towns. Part of SR A1A between Flagler Beach and Jacksonville Beach is designated the A1A Scenic and Historic Coastal Byway, a National Scenic Byway. SR A1A is famous worldwide as a center of beach culture in the United States, a scenic coastal route through most Atlantic coastal cities and beach towns, including the unique tropical coral islands of the Florida Keys.

A portion of SR A1A that passes through Volusia County is designated the Ormond Scenic Loop and Trail, a Florida Scenic Highway. It is also called the Indian River Lagoon Scenic Highway from State Road 510 at Wabasso Beach to U.S. Route 1 in Cocoa. In 2024, the entirety of Highway A1A, from Key West to Yulee, was designated the Jimmy Buffett Memorial Highway. Other than related routes of SR A1A (such as SR A1A Alternate, now SR 811, CR 707, SR 732, and an extension of SR 842), only two other Florida state roads have begun with a letter: SR A19A (now a loop of SR 693–SR 699–SR 682 near St. Petersburg), and SR G1A (now SR 300). In 2026, multiple frontage and service roads in Miami were assigned the designations SR A1AF and SR A1AS respectively.

The road was designated as State Road 1 in the 1945 renumbering, mostly replacing the former State Road 140 designation. The number reflected its location in the new grid as the easternmost major north–south road. About a year and a half later, in November 1946, the State Road Board resolved to renumber the route due to confusion with the parallel U.S. Highway 1. The new designation, A1A, was chosen to keep the number 1 in its place in the grid.

The East Coast Greenway, a system of trails that connects Maine to Florida, travels along sections of SR A1A.

== Overview ==
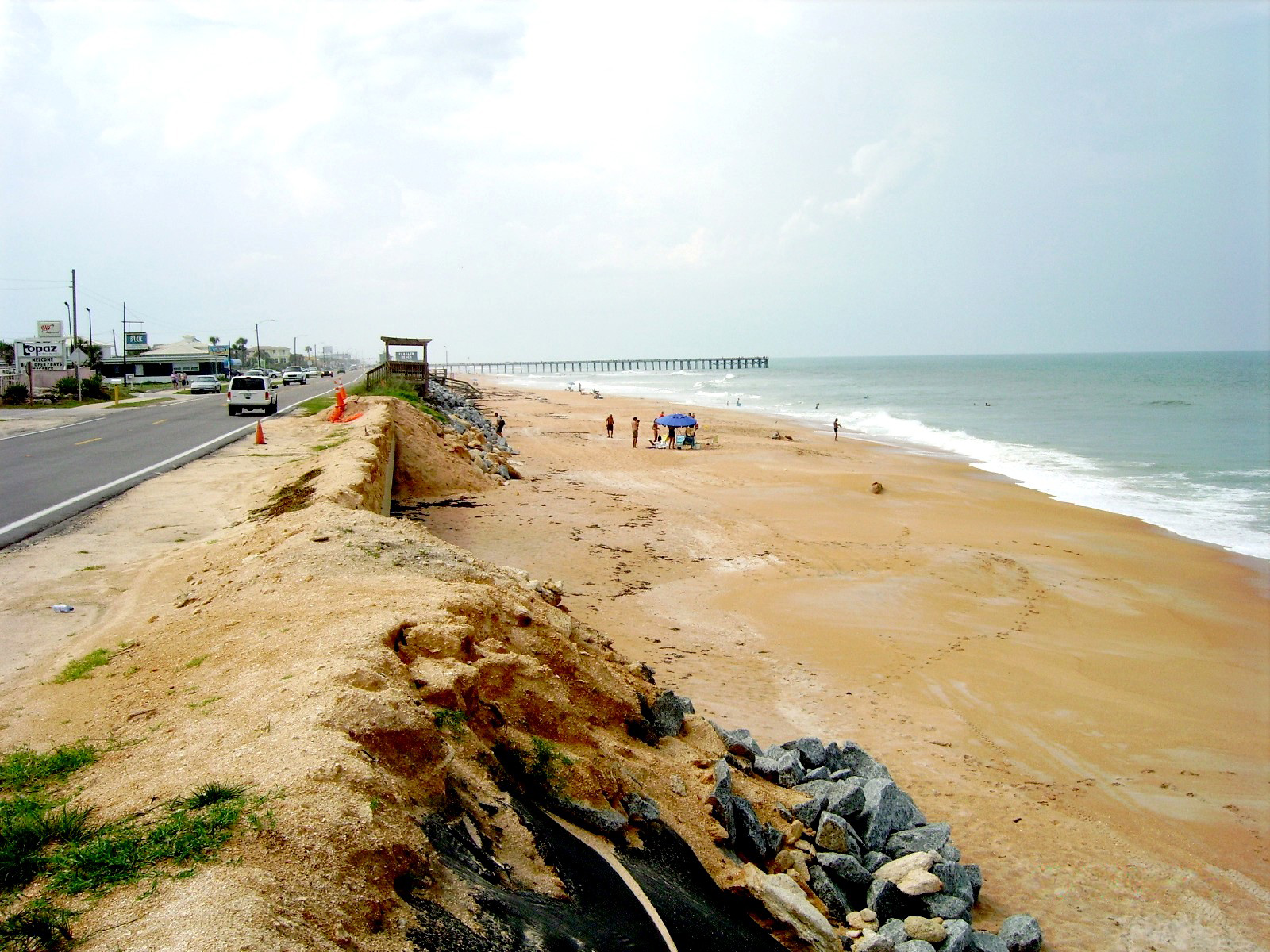
Scenic stretch of SR A1A in Flagler Beach

SR A1A is heavily associated with Florida beach culture and is known for its lush tropical and subtropical scenery and ocean vistas. In many places, the highway runs directly along the waterfront of the Atlantic Ocean, but in other places, it runs one to five blocks inland from the beachfront. For most of its length, SR A1A runs along Florida's East Coast Barrier Islands, separated from the mainland of the state by the Intracoastal Waterway. Because of the proximity of the highway to the ocean and its susceptibility to storm surges, sections of SR A1A are often closed or damaged by hurricanes and tropical storms.

SR A1A also has been a backbone of Florida's spring break serving as "the strip" in both Fort Lauderdale – a popular spring break destination during the 1960s, 1970s and 1980s – and Daytona Beach, which became a popular destination for college spring breaks during the 1970s. Today, SR A1A serves as more a main coastal highway that connects beach towns for more than 375 miles (600 km) along Florida's east coast.

== Route description ==
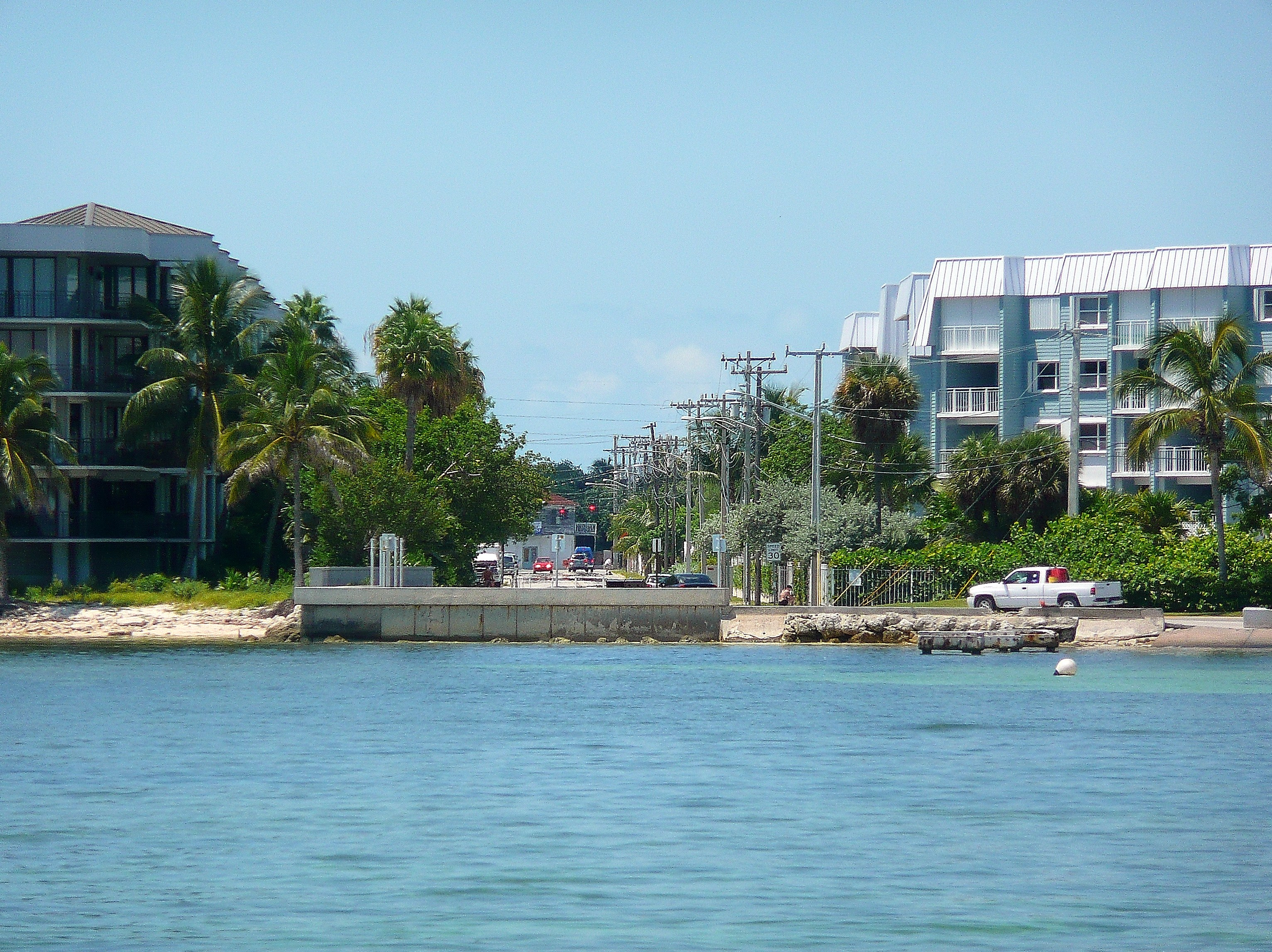
The beginning of SR A1A (Milestone 0) at Bertha Street in Key West

Though SR A1A runs from Key West to north of Jacksonville, the designation is not one continuous route. In some areas such as the Florida Keys, there is no oceanfront highway (other than the Overseas Highway, US 1), other parts of the coast are served by county roads (sometimes designated County Road A1A) rather than state roads, and still other areas are restricted by geography (inlets) or usage (e.g. nature preserves and the Kennedy Space Center). The longest of the route's seven sections runs 106 miles (171 km) from Stuart to Cocoa, while three of the sections are less than 10 miles (15 km) long

The southern terminus of the first section of SR A1A is at the southern end of Bertha Street, where SR A1A begins as a two-lane, then a four-lane highway along the Straits of Florida in Key West, known locally as South Roosevelt Boulevard. The road heads east past East Martello Tower and Key West International Airport, before curving north with an intersection with CR 5A (Flagler Avenue), followed by the northern terminus of the Key West section of SR A1A, U.S. Route 1 and State Road 5 (the Overseas Highway). Running along the south shore of Key West, SR A1A is the southernmost numbered highway in the lower 48 states.

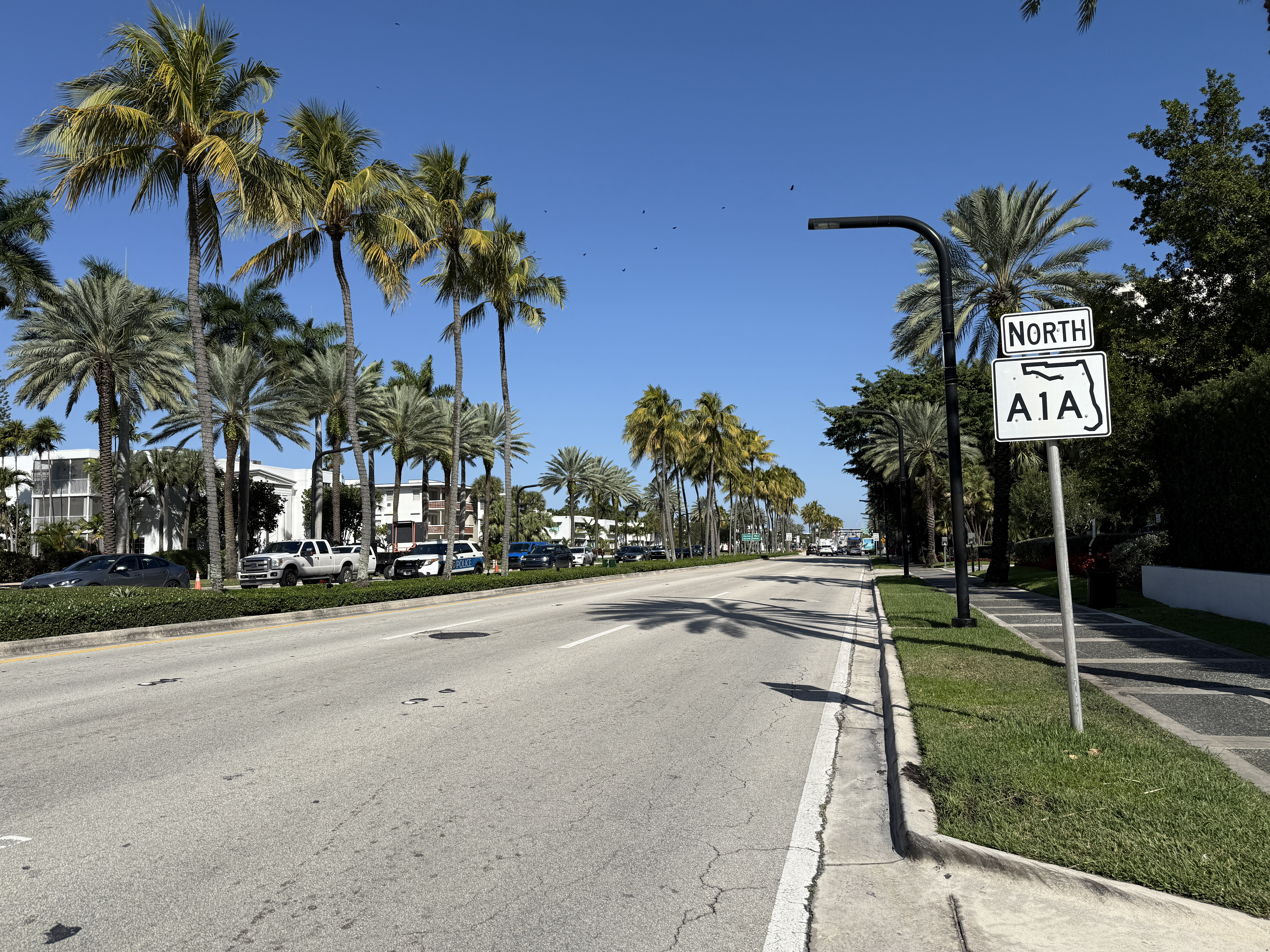
SR A1A northbound in Bal Harbour

SR A1A reappears at Interstate 395 and US 1 in Miami, beginning at MacArthur Causeway before becoming Collins Avenue at Fifth Street in Miami Beach (or, in small segments, Harding Avenue, Abbott Avenue, or Indian Creek Drive), serving as one of Miami Beach's main north — south thoroughfares. In this stretch, Collins Avenue runs along the western edge of the Miami Beach Architectural District, a collection of more than 900 hotels and apartment buildings built largely in the Art Deco and Streamline Moderne styles between the 1920s and the early 1940s; the district was added to the National Register of Historic Places on May 14, 1979. Just north in the town of Surfside, the northbound is Collins Avenue, and the southbound is Harding Avenue. In Bal Harbour it is called Bal Harbour Boulevard. In Golden Beach it is called Ocean Boulevard.

It serves Hallandale Beach, Hollywood Beach, and Dania Beach. It joins with US 1 for 3.4 miles, and passes the Fort Lauderdale–Hollywood International Airport. It then divides and serves Fort Lauderdale, Pompano Beach, and continuing north.

It serves as the main road throughout much of the exclusive Palm Beach, further to the north.

In the area of Vero Beach, SR A1A is called the Robert C. Spillman Memorial Highway, and it spans Sebastian Inlet at the Sebastian Inlet Bridge.

SR A1A next passes just to the west of Cape Canaveral and the John F. Kennedy Space Center.

Two miles of SR A1A were used as part of the well-known Daytona Beach Road Course.

SR A1A passes through St. Augustine, the oldest continuously-inhabited city on the mainland of the United States, before turning east and running adjacent to the coast in St. John's County until it reaches Ponte Vedra Beach. In Ponte Vedra Beach, the route gradually widens to a six-lane highway before entering Duval County.

Within Duval County, SR A1A is called 3rd Street in Jacksonville Beach and Neptune Beach; it serves as the primary thoroughfare connecting these cities. Just south of Atlantic Beach, SR A1A turns inland for several blocks, following Atlantic Boulevard, before resuming a northward course along Mayport Road that ends at the St. Johns River. A ferry takes traffic to the northern section of SR A1A which continues along the coast into Nassau County.

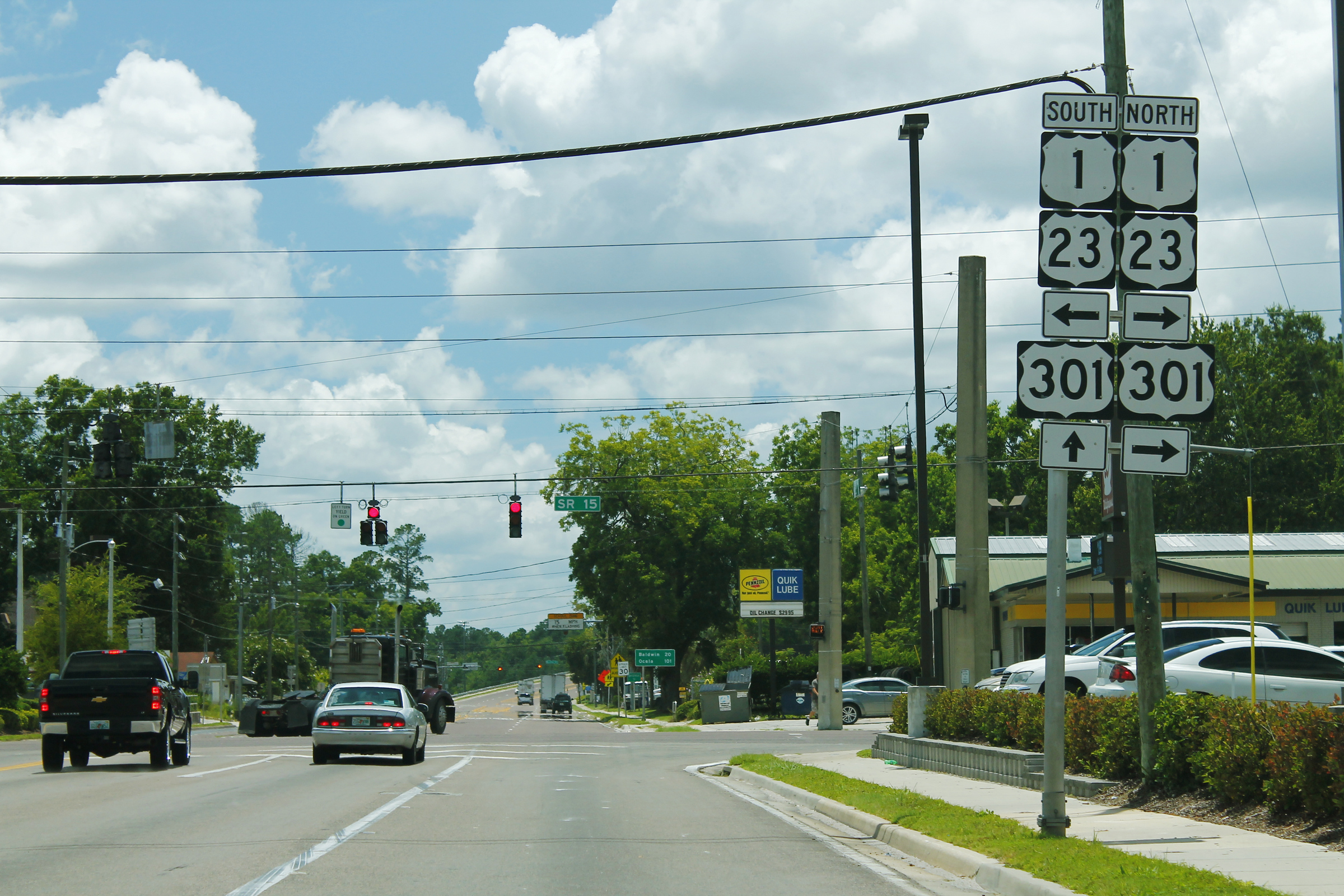
Western terminus of SR A1A in Callahan

In Nassau County, SR A1A is a coastal thoroughfare until just south of Fort Clinch State Park on the estuary of the Saint Mary's River. At that point SR A1A hooks back south to Fernandina Beach and then turns west, going inland 20 miles through Yulee and crossing I-95 and U.S. Highway 17. It ends at U.S. Highway 1, U.S. Highway 23, and U.S. Highway 301 in Callahan. This section west of Fernandina Beach, is also marked as SR 200, but SR A1A signs are displayed at every cluster of signs, though a designated direction is only above the SR 200 signs.

== History ==
=== Pre-1945 alignment ===
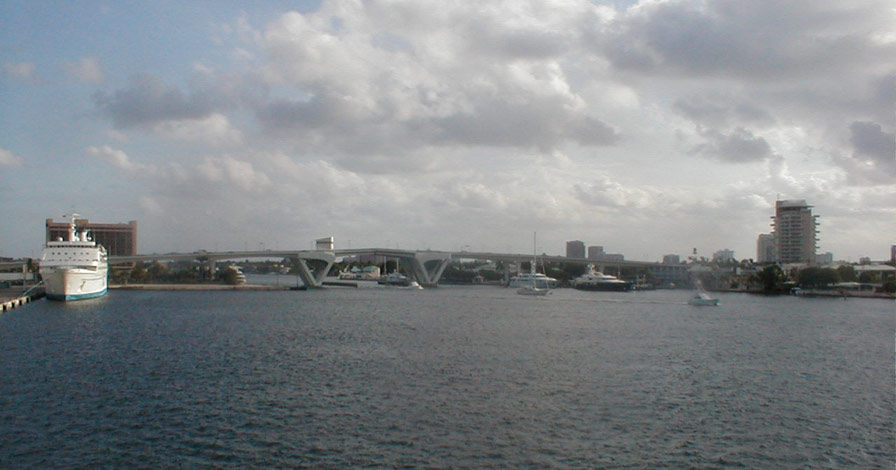
SR A1A as it runs over the 17th Street Causeway in Ft. Lauderdale.

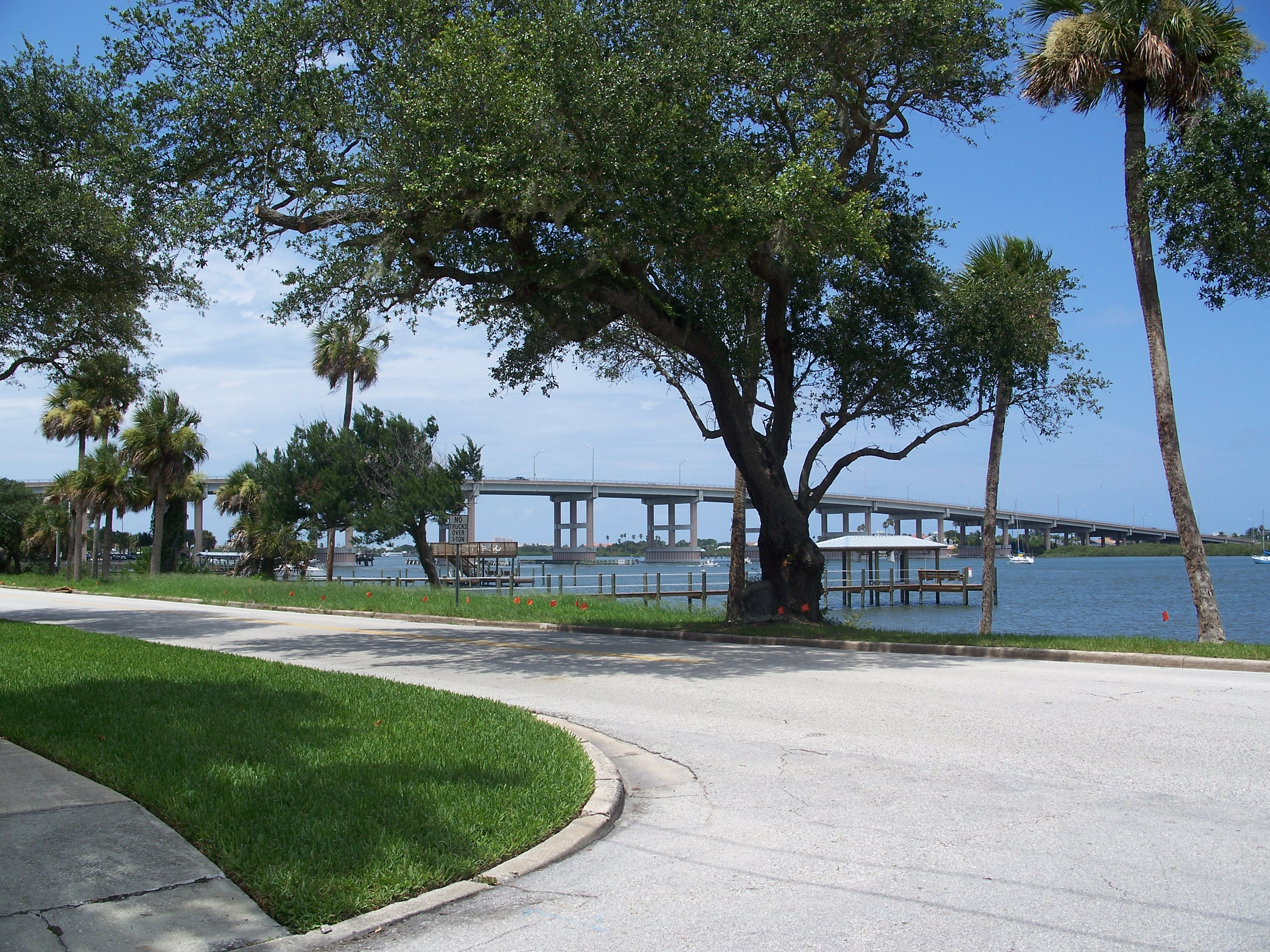
SR A1A as it runs over the South Causeway in New Smyrna Beach.

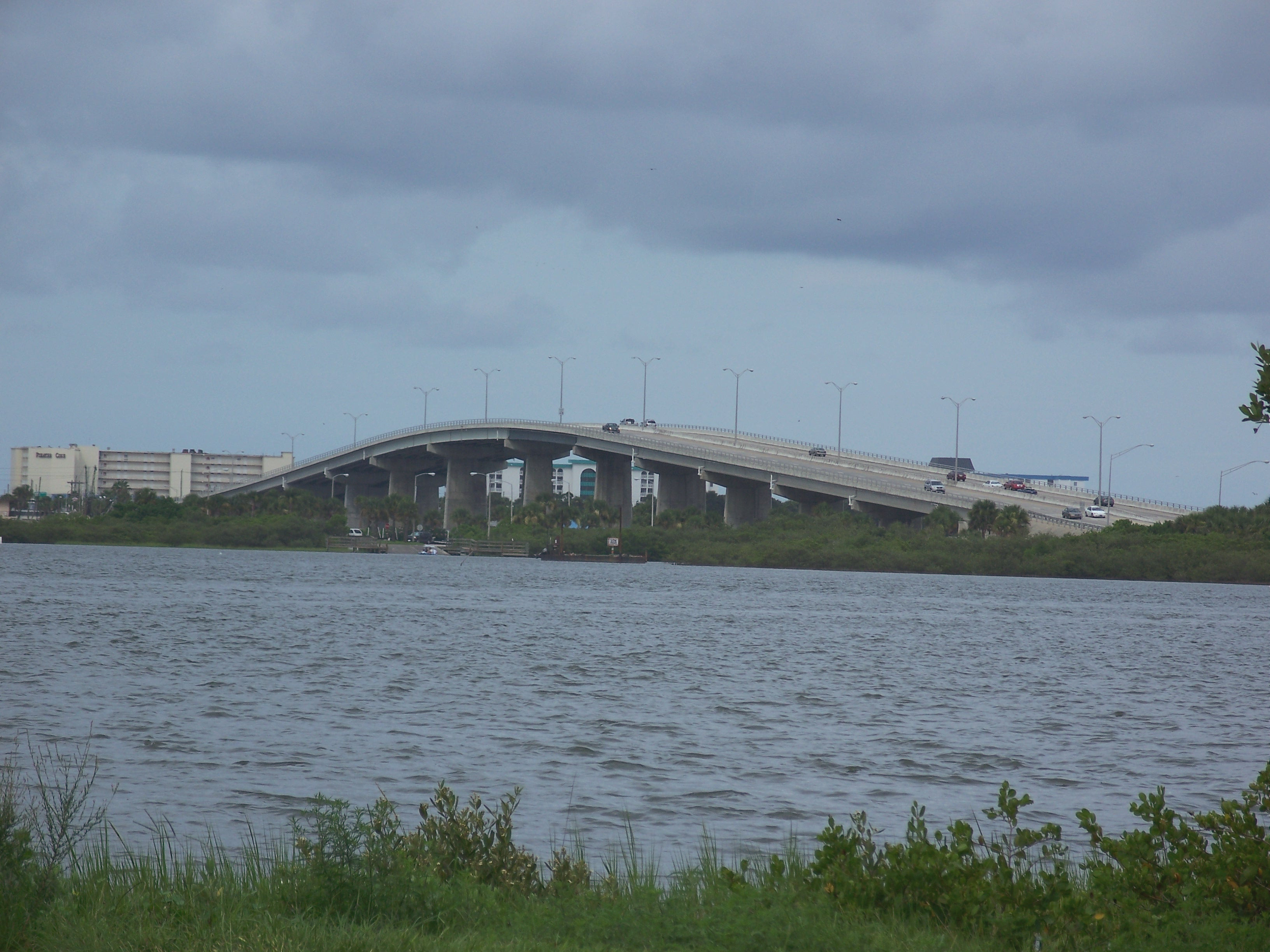
SR A1A as it runs over the Halifax River in Port Orange.

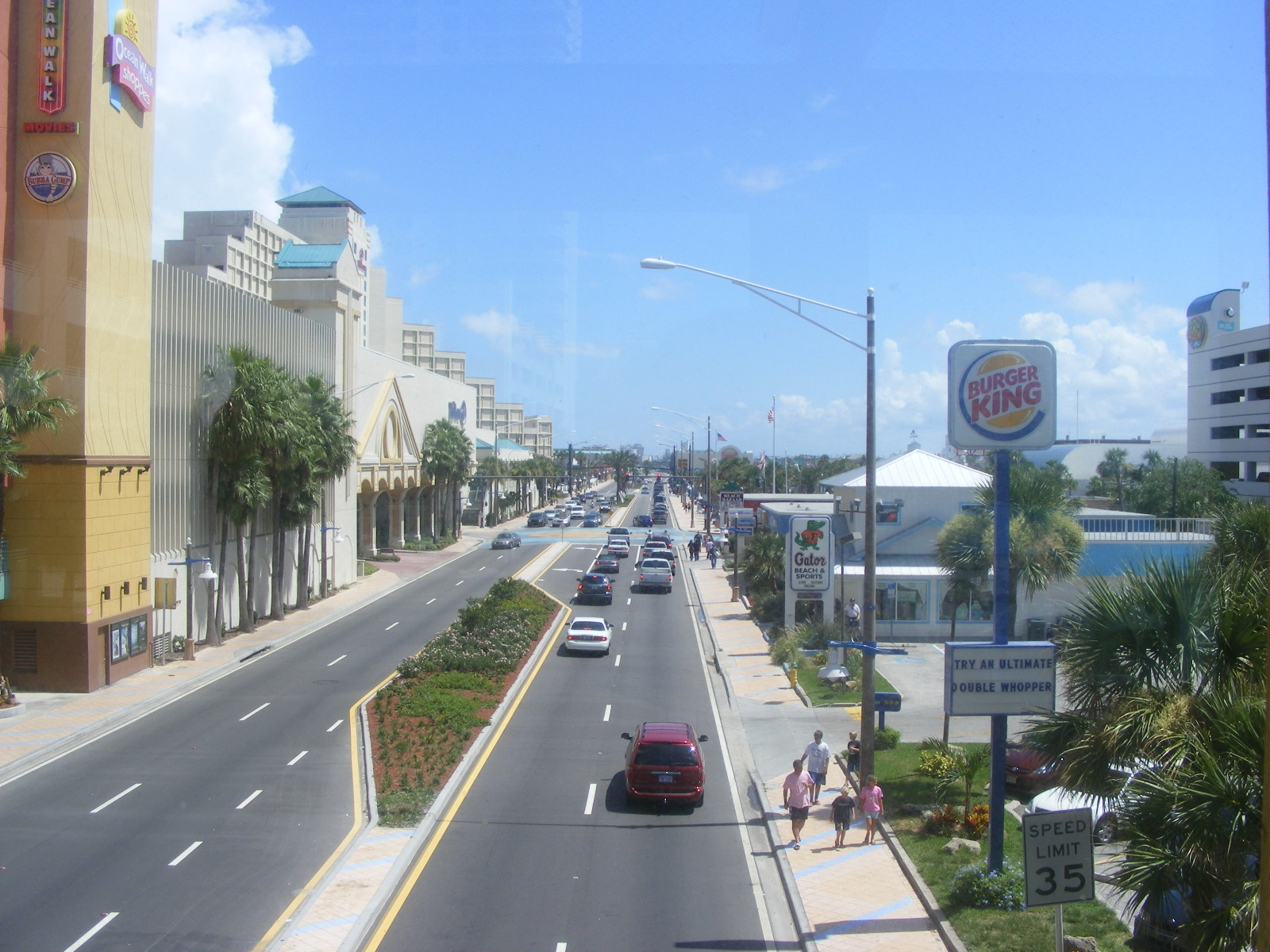
SR A1A in Daytona Beach

Prior to the 1945 renumbering, the route that became SR 1 had the following numbers:

- SR 182 from Miami to Miami Beach
- SR 140 from Miami Beach to Dania Beach
- SR 178 from Dania Beach to Dania
- SR 177 from downtown Fort Lauderdale east to the Atlantic Ocean
- SR 140 from the Atlantic Ocean in Fort Lauderdale to Palm Beach
- SR 305 from Palm Beach to West Palm Beach
- SR 25 from Palm Beach to West Palm Beach
- SR 196 from Lake Park to south of Jupiter
- SR 176 from North Palm Beach to Jupiter
- SR 200 from south of Jupiter to Jupiter
- SR 140 from Jupiter to Stuart
- SR 140 from north of Stuart to Jensen Beach
- SR 224 from Jensen Beach east to the Atlantic Ocean
- unnumbered from the Atlantic Ocean east of Jensen Beach to the Martin/St. Lucie County line
- SR 332 from the Martin/St. Lucie County line to the Atlantic Ocean east of Fort Pierce
- SR 559 from the Martin/St. Lucie County line (?) to Fort Pierce
- SR 162 from the Atlantic Ocean east of Fort Pierce to Fort Pierce
- SR 140 north of Fort Pierce
- SR 559 from Fort Pierce to Vero Beach
- SR 140 from Vero Beach to near Canaveral Harbor
- SR 252 from Vero Beach to Wabasso Beach
- SR 273 from near Canaveral Harbor to north of Canaveral
- SR 140 from north of Canaveral to New Smyrna Beach
- SR 119 southwest of Titusville Beach
- SR 140 from Ponce Inlet to St. Augustine
- SR 21 in Daytona Beach
- SR 468 in Ormond Beach
- SR 140 from St. Augustine to Jacksonville

=== Initial alignment ===
SR 1, the original designation of SR A1A after the 1945 renumbering

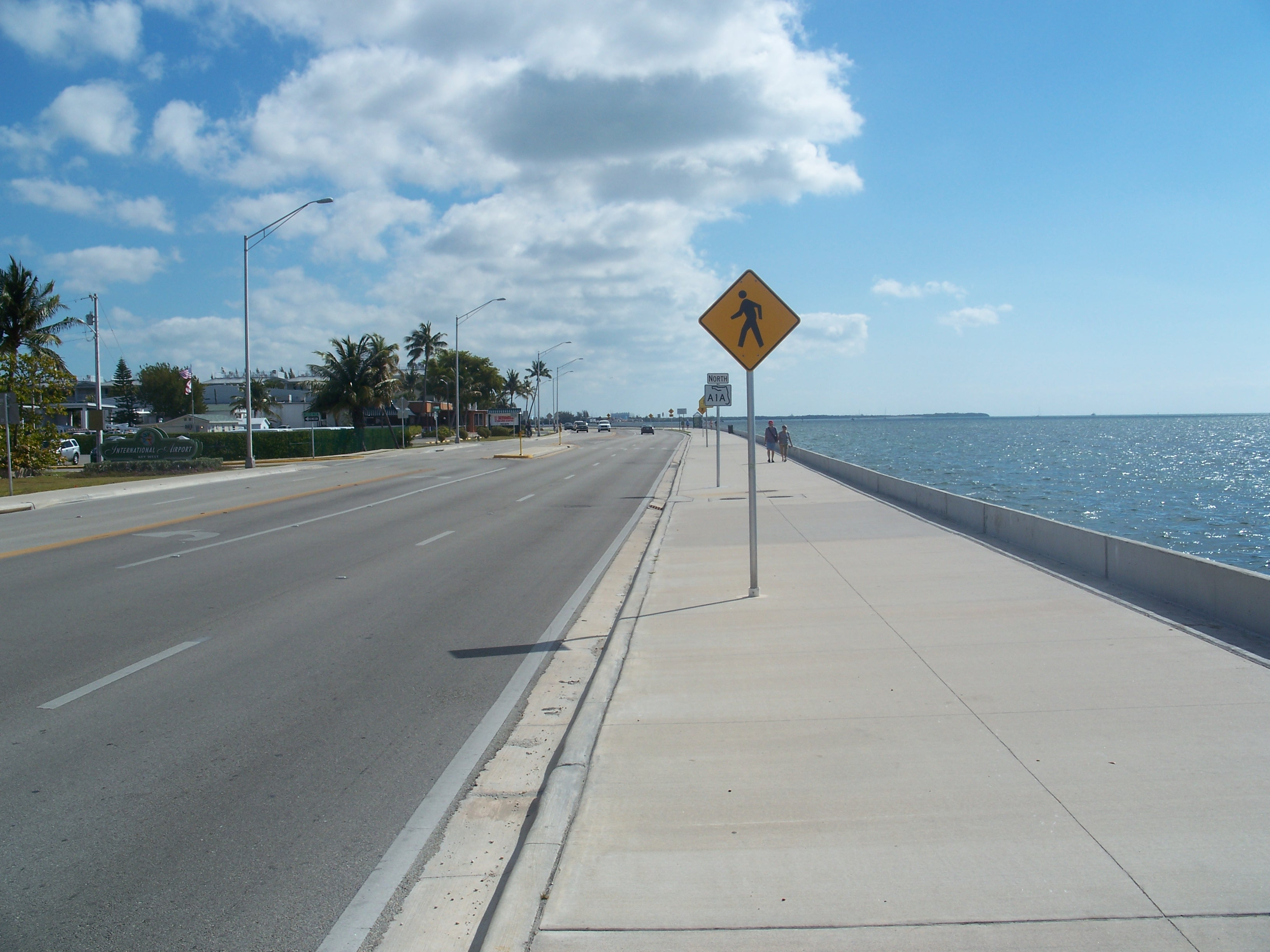
SR A1A in Key West

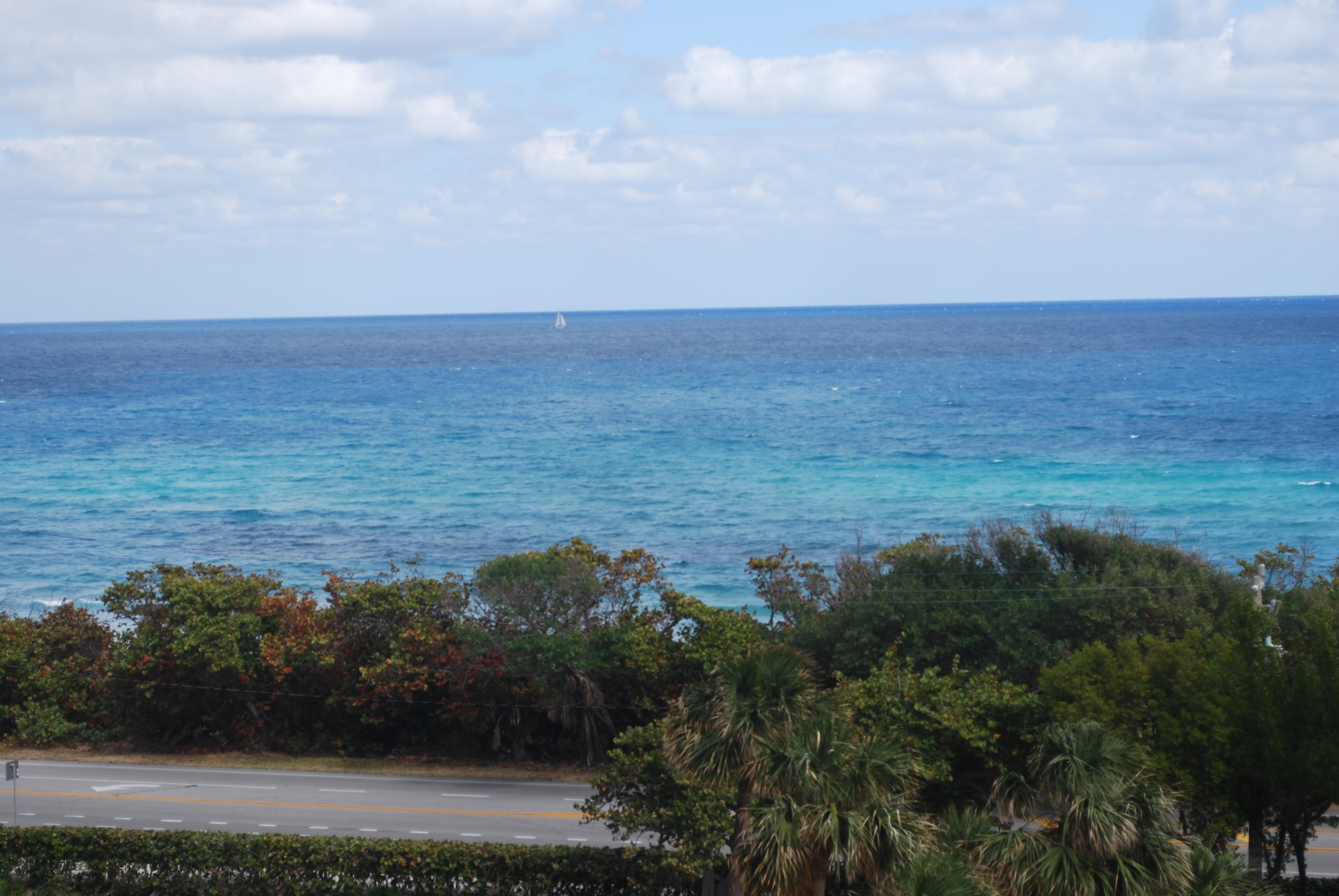
SR A1A in Boca Raton

SR 1 was defined in the 1945 renumbering as:

- From the intersection of 13th St. and SR 5 in Miami east along 13th St. and across the 13th St. Causeway (now called the MacArthur Causeway) to Miami Beach, then northerly along the Ocean Route via Surfside and Hallandale Beach to a point on SR 5 in Dania Beach.
- From the intersection of East Las Olas Boulevard and SR 5 in Ft. Lauderdale, east along East Las Olas Blvd.; then across New River Sound, then northerly via Deerfield Beach – Boca Raton – Lake Worth Beach to a point on SR 5 in West Palm Beach.
- Also from the intersection of Southern Blvd. and SR 5 in West Palm Beach east across Lake Worth Beach to a junction with SR 1 in Palm Beach.
- From the intersection of Park Ave. and SR 5 in Lake Park, west on Park Ave. to 10th St., thence northerly via Jupiter to a junction with SR 5 in Stuart.
- From a point on SR 5 north of St. Lucie River in Stuart, then northeasterly via Jensen and across the Indian River, then northwesterly to a junction with SR 5 in Ft. Pierce.
- From an intersection with SR 5 in Ft. Pierce northerly to a junction with SR 605, thence easterly across the Indian River, thence northerly via Vero Beach, Melbourne Beach, Cocoa Beach, Canaveral, and Titusville Beach to a junction with SR 5 in New Smyrna Beach.
- Also a leg running northwesterly from a point on SR 1 approximately two miles south of Titusville Beach to a junction with SR 402 approximately one mile west of Titusville Beach in Brevard County.
- From a point approximately nine miles south of Daytona Beach northwesterly via Daytona Beach, Ormond, and Flagler Beach to a junction with SR 5 in St. Augustine.
- Also at the intersection of SR 5 and SR 600, east on Volusia Ave., then north on North Beach St., then east on a bridge across the Halifax River and on Broadway to a junction with SR 1, all in Daytona Beach.
- Also at the intersection Granada Ave. and SR 5, east on Granada Ave. across the Halifax River to a junction with SR 1 – all in Ormond.
- From the intersection of May St. and SR 5 in St. Augustine, northeasterly along May St. and across the North River to Vilano, then northerly via Ponte Vedra – Jacksonville Beach to the city limits of Atlantic Beach and Neptune Beach, then west along Atlantic Blvd. to a junction with SR 5 in Jacksonville.

=== Alignment modifications ===
Since then, the following changes have been made:

- The section in Key West was added. The portion of A1A on Bertha Street from the beaches to Roosevelt Boulevard (US 1) was later relinquished to the city.
- The bridge over the Intracoastal Waterway in Fort Lauderdale was moved south; the old one became "SR A1A ALT" (now SR 842).
- The part from Lake Park to Jupiter became "SR A1A ALT" (now SR 811), and two new sections were added along the shore, from Riviera Beach to north of Lake Park (formerly State Road 703) and from Juno Beach to Jupiter. The latter is now CR A1A.
- The part from Jupiter to Hobe Sound became SR 707; SR A1A was extended south from Hobe Sound to meet SR 5 (U.S. Route 1). This part is now CR A1A.
- The part north of Stuart (including a segment that was signed State Road 705) was extended south to incorporate the Ernest F. Lyons Bridge and give a more direct access to the Atlantic Ocean from Stuart; the old road became SR A1A Alternate (now CR 707 and SR 732). Recently the part in downtown Stuart, west of SR 714, became CR A1A.
- Both bridges over the Intracoastal Waterway in Fort Pierce were rebuilt and moved slightly south. The approach to the south one moved two blocks south.
- When Kennedy Space Center was built around 1962, SR A1A through it was closed and rerouted from the south to go west on SR 528. A small piece of the old road may have become SR 401, but SR 401 now ends before it reaches the old road. Cape Road, which runs east of Launch complex 39, was SR A1A; it ended at former SR 402 at Playalinda Beach. The part from there to south of New Smyrna Beach was never built.
- SR A1A south of New Smyrna Beach is now CR A1A; part of it in New Smyrna Beach still exists, and ends 10 miles (16 km) south of New Smyrna Beach near Turtle Mound. The part connecting to Titusville Beach was never built.
- The part south of Daytona Beach was routed onto a new bridge at Port Orange; the old road south of the bridge became CR A1A and is now CR 4075.
- SR A1A was realigned away from the Atlantic Ocean south of St. Augustine onto what had been SR 3; the south half of the old road became CR A1A.
- The two sections in St. Augustine were connected when SR 5 (U.S. Route 1) was moved west onto a bypass and old SR 5 became SR 5A (Alt US 1).
- The north bridge over the Intracoastal Waterway at St. Augustine was moved north, with the east approach moving two blocks north.
- A bypass was built around Ponte Vedra Beach; the old road became SR 203 (later CR 203 in St. Johns County and Duval County).
- SR A1A was moved out of Jacksonville and onto what had been part of SR 101, a new alignment to the ferry across the St. Johns River, and what still is SR 105 and SR 200. The old road became an extension of SR 10.
- None of the spurs to the mainland are SR A1A any more. The one at West Palm Beach became part of SR 80 on October 25, 1946; the ones at Daytona Beach (now SR 600) and Ormond Beach (now SR 40) were longer, for SR 40 did not originally go to Ormond Beach.

=== Jungle Trail ===
The Jungle Trail (pre-1945 State Road 252) was part of A1A in northeastern Indian River County, Florida. The narrow, 7 1/2-mile-long (12.1 km) road is located between Old Winter Beach Road and the current A1A, along the western side of Orchid Island, and is unpaved. It is part of the Indian River Lagoon Scenic Highway system, and the southernmost road in the highway system. Part of the trail goes through the Pelican Island National Wildlife Refuge.

The road started as a means to quickly transport citrus to packinghouses on the mainland, then in the 1930s and 1940s became more used by tourists. On August 1, 2003, it was added to the United States National Register of Historic Places.

== Major intersections ==
County	Location	mi	km	Destinations	Notes
Monroe	Key West	0.000	0.000	Bertha Street	Southern terminus
Monroe	Key West	2.625	4.225	CR 5A south (Flagler Avenue)	former SR 5A south
Monroe	Key West	2.895	4.659	US 1 (Roosevelt Boulevard / Overseas Highway / SR 5)	
Gap in route
Miami-Dade	Miami	0.000	0.000	I-395 west (SR 836) / US 1 (Biscayne Boulevard) to I-95 – Airport	Highway continues west as I-395; US 1 (SR 5) exit is exit 2; I-95 is exit 1
Miami-Dade	Miami	0.2	0.32	MacArthur Causeway over Intracoastal Waterway	
Miami-Dade	Miami	0.5	0.80	SR 887 (Port Miami via Tunnel)	Interchange; northbound exit and southbound entrance
Miami-Dade	Miami	0.9	1.4	Watson Island, Jungle Island, Miami Children's Museum & Miami Seaplane Base	Interchange
Miami-Dade	Miami Beach	1.634	2.630	Fountain Street – Palm Island, Hibiscus Island	Eastern terminus of freeway section
Miami-Dade	Miami Beach	3.192	5.137	SR 907 north (Alton Road)	Northbound flyover ramp; southern terminus of SR 907
Miami-Dade	Miami Beach	4.913	7.907	17th Street	To Venetian Causeway
Miami-Dade	Miami Beach	6.411	10.318	SR 112 west (Arthur Godfrey Road) to I-95 – Airport	Eastern terminus of SR 112
Miami-Dade	Miami Beach	8.658	13.934	SR 907 south (63rd Street)	Northern terminus of SR 907
Miami-Dade	Miami Beach	9.452	15.212	SR 934 west (71st Street) – Airport	Eastern terminus of SR 934
Miami-Dade	Surfside–Bal Harbour line	11.592	18.656	SR 922 west (96th Street) to I-95	Eastern terminus of SR 922
Miami-Dade	Sunny Isles Beach	14.590	23.480	SR 826 west (Sunny Isles Boulevard) to US 1	At-grade intersection with northbound flyover; eastern terminus of SR 826
Miami-Dade	Sunny Isles Beach	16.244	26.142	SR 856 west (William Lehman Causeway) to US 1	At-grade intersection with northbound flyover; eastern terminus of SR 856
Broward	Hallandale Beach–Hollywood line	18.488	29.754	SR 858 west (Hallandale Beach Boulevard) to I-95	At-grade intersection with northbound flyover; eastern terminus of SR 858
Broward	Hollywood	20.3	32.7	SR 820 west (Hollywood Boulevard) to Florida's Turnpike / I-95	Interchange; eastern terminus of SR 820
Broward	Hollywood	21.806	35.093	SR 822 west (Sheridan Street) to I-95	Eastern terminus of SR 822
Broward	Hollywood	23.4	37.7	Dania Beach Boulevard Bridge over Intracoastal Waterway	
Broward	Dania Beach	25.166	40.501	US 1 south to I-95	Southern terminus of concurrency with US 1 (SR 5)
Broward	Fort Lauderdale–Hollywood– Dania Beach tripoint	25.978	41.808	SR 818 west (Griffin Road) / Taylor Road to I-95 / Florida's Turnpike	Eastern terminus of SR 818
Broward	Fort Lauderdale–Hollywood– Dania Beach tripoint	26.5	42.6	Fort Lauderdale-Hollywood International Airport	Interchange
Broward	Fort Lauderdale–Hollywood– Dania Beach tripoint	27.4	44.1	I-595 west to I-95 / Florida's Turnpike – Port Everglades	No southbound access to Port Everglades; exits 12A-B on I-595
Broward	Fort Lauderdale	28.240	45.448	SR 84 west (Marina Boulevard) to Florida's Turnpike / I-95 – Port Everglades	Eastern terminus of SR 84
Broward	Fort Lauderdale	28.757	46.280	US 1 north / Southeast 17th Street west (CR 811 north) – Downtown	Northern terminus of concurrency with US 1 (SR 5)
Broward	Fort Lauderdale	29.9	48.1	17th Street Causeway over Intracoastal Waterway	
Broward	Fort Lauderdale	31.721	51.050	Las Olas Boulevard – Downtown Fort Lauderdale	former SR 842 west
Broward	Fort Lauderdale	33.031	53.158	SR 838 west (Sunrise Boulevard) to I-95 / Florida's Turnpike	Eastern terminus of SR 838
Broward	Fort Lauderdale	35.514	57.154	SR 816 west (Oakland Park Boulevard) to I-95	Eastern terminus of SR 816
Broward	Lauderdale-by-the-Sea	36.619	58.933	SR 870 west (Commercial Boulevard)	Eastern terminus of SR 870
Broward	Pompano Beach	39.541	63.635	SR 814 west (Atlantic Boulevard) to US 1	Eastern terminus of SR 814
Broward	Pompano Beach	40.868	65.771	SR 844 (Northeast 14th Street) to US 1	Eastern terminus of SR 844; to Northeast 14th Street Causeway
Broward	Hillsboro Inlet	41.76	67.21	Hillsboro Inlet Bridge	
Broward	Deerfield Beach	45.477	73.188	SR 810 west (Hillsboro Boulevard) to I-95	Eastern terminus of SR 810
Palm Beach	Boca Raton	48.094	77.400	Palmetto Park Road (CR 798 west) to I-95	Eastern terminus of CR 798 (former SR 798)
Palm Beach	Boca Raton	50.568	81.381	SR 800 west (Spanish River Boulevard)	Eastern terminus of SR 800
Palm Beach	Delray Beach	54.246	87.300	Linton Boulevard (CR 782 west) to I-95	Eastern terminus of CR 782 (former SR 782)
Palm Beach	Delray Beach	55.793	89.790	SR 806 west (East Atlantic Avenue) to I-95	Eastern terminus of SR 806
Palm Beach	Delray Beach	56.701	91.251	George Bush Boulevard (CR 806A west)	Eastern terminus of CR 806A (former SR 806A)
Palm Beach	Ocean Ridge	59.470	95.708	Woolbright Road (CR 792 west) to I-95	Eastern terminus of unsigned CR 792 (former SR 792)
Palm Beach	Ocean Ridge	60.385	97.180	SR 804 west (Ocean Avenue) to I-95	Eastern terminus of SR 804
Palm Beach	Manalapan–Lantana line	64.400	103.642	Ocean Avenue (CR 812 west) to I-95	Eastern terminus of unsigned CR 812
Palm Beach	Lake Worth Beach	66.552	107.105	SR 802 west (Lake Avenue)	To Lake Worth Bridge; eastern terminus of SR 802
Palm Beach	Palm Beach	70.8	113.9	US 98 west / SR 80 west (Southern Boulevard) to I-95 / US 1	Traffic circle; eastern terminus of US 98 / SR 80
Palm Beach	Palm Beach	73.053	117.567	SR 704 west (Royal Palm Way) to I-95 / Florida's Turnpike	Eastern terminus of SR 704
Palm Beach	Lake Worth Lagoon	74.6	120.1	Flagler Memorial Bridge	
Palm Beach	West Palm Beach	74.7	120.2	Flagler Drive	Interchange; northbound exit and southbound entrance
Palm Beach	West Palm Beach	74.894	120.530	US 1 (Dixie Highway / Quadrille Boulevard / SR 5)	
Palm Beach	Gap in route, connection made via US 1				
Palm Beach	Riviera Beach	0.000	0.000	US 1 (Broadway / SR 5) / SR 708 west (Blue Heron Boulevard)	Eastern terminus of SR 708
Palm Beach	Riviera Beach	0.6	0.97	Blue Heron Bridge over Lake Worth Lagoon	
Palm Beach	Palm Beach Gardens	6.207	9.989	US 1 (Federal Highway / SR 5) / SR 786 west (PGA Boulevard) to Florida's Turnpike / I-95	
Gap in route, connection made via US 1
Martin	Stuart	1.765	2.840	SR 714 west (Southeast Monterey Road) to US 1 / Florida's Turnpike / East Ocean Boulevard (CR A1A west)	Eastern terminus of SR 714; transition between unsigned CR A1A and SR A1A
Martin	Sewall's Point	2.9	4.7	Evans Crary Bridge over St. Lucie River	
Martin	Sewall's Point	3.335	5.367	Sewalls Point Road (CR 707) – Jensen Beach	Southern terminus of unsigned CR 707
Martin	Sewall's Point	4.0	6.4	Ernest Lyons Bridge over Indian River	
Martin	Jensen Beach	8.1	13.0	SR 732 west (Causeway Boulevard)	Roundabout; eastern terminus of SR 732
St. Lucie	Fort Pierce	26.1	42.0	South Causeway over Indian River	
St. Lucie	Fort Pierce	26.499	42.646	Indian River Drive	Former SR 707
St. Lucie	Fort Pierce	26.614	42.831	US 1 south (SR 5)	Southern terminus of concurrency with US 1
St. Lucie	Fort Pierce	27.129	43.660	Old Dixie Highway (CR 605 north)	south end of unsigned CR 605 (former SR 605)
St. Lucie	Fort Pierce	27.727	44.622	US 1 north (SR 5)	Northern terminus of concurrency with US 1
St. Lucie	Fort Pierce	27.836	44.798	Old Dixie Highway (CR 605)	unsigned CR 605 (former SR 605)
St. Lucie	Fort Pierce	28.3	45.5	North Causeway over Indian River	
Indian River	Vero Beach	41.091	66.130	SR 656 west (East Causeway Boulevard)	To 17th Street Causeway; eastern terminus of SR 656
Indian River	Vero Beach	42.576	68.519	SR 60 west (Beachland Boulevard) to I-95	To Merrill P. Barber Bridge; eastern terminus of SR 60
Indian River	Wabasso Beach	50.627	81.476	SR 510 west (Wabasso Road) to US 1	Eastern terminus of SR 510
Sebastian Inlet		58.101	93.504	Sebastian Inlet Bridge	
Brevard	Indialantic	75.637	121.726	US 192 west (Fifth Avenue / SR 500) to I-95 – Melbourne, Airport	To Melbourne Causeway; eastern terminus of US 192 and unsigned SR 500
Brevard	Melbourne	79.010	127.154	SR 518 west (Eau Gallie Boulevard) to I-95 – Airport	To Eau Gallie Causeway; eastern terminus of SR 518
Brevard	South Patrick Shores	84.200	135.507	SR 404 west (Pineda Causeway) to US 1	Eastern terminus of SR 404
Brevard	Cocoa Beach	94.249	151.679	SR 520 west (Cocoa Beach Causeway)	Eastern terminus of SR 520
Brevard		97.69	157.22	Port Canaveral B Cruise Terminals, South Cargo Piers (CR 401 south)	Interchange; south end of freeway
Brevard		98.363	158.300	SR 401 north – Cape Canaveral Space Force Station, Port Canaveral A Cruise Terminals, North Cargo Piers	Interchange; southern terminus of SR 401 and eastern terminus of SR 528 overlap
Brevard	Merritt Island	99.4	160.0	Bennett Causeway over Banana River	
Brevard	Merritt Island	100.46	161.67	Banana River Drive	Exit 52 (SR 528)
Brevard	Merritt Island	103.02	165.79	SR 3 – Merritt Island, Kennedy Space Center	Exit 49 (SR 528)
Brevard	Cocoa	104.8	168.7	Bennett Causeway over Indian River	
Brevard	Cocoa	105.934	170.484	US 1 (SR 5) – Cocoa, Titusville SR 528 west to I-95 – Orlando	Exit 46 (SR 528); western terminus of concurrency with SR 528
Gap in route
Volusia	New Smyrna Beach	0.000	0.000	CR A1A south (South Atlantic Avenue) / 6th Avenue	South end of state maintenance
Volusia	New Smyrna Beach	1.8	2.9	South Causeway over Indian River	
Volusia	New Smyrna Beach	2.085	3.355	Live Oak Street to SR 44 east (North Causeway)	
Volusia	New Smyrna Beach	2.163	3.481	SR 44 west (Lytle Avenue)	Northbound exit and southbound entrance
Volusia	New Smyrna Beach	2.289	3.684	US 1 (Dixie Freeway / SR 5)	
Volusia	Gap in route				
Volusia	Port Orange	0.000	0.000	US 1 (South Ridgewood Avenue / SR 5) / SR 421 west (Dunlawton Avenue) to I-95 – New Smyrna Beach, Daytona Beach	
Volusia	Port Orange	0.8	1.3	Port Orange Causeway over Halifax River	
Volusia	Port Orange–Daytona Beach Shores line	1.080	1.738	SR 441 north (Peninsula Drive)	
Volusia	Daytona Beach Shores	1.239	1.994	CR 4075 (South Atlantic Avenue) – Wilbur-by-the-Sea, Ponce Inlet	Northern terminus of CR 4075
Volusia	Daytona Beach	5.882	9.466	Silver Beach Avenue (CR 4050 west) — Ballpark	Eastern terminus of unsigned CR 4050
Volusia	Daytona Beach	6.601	10.623	US 92 west (International Speedway Boulevard / SR 600) to US 1 / I-95 / I-4 – DeLand	Eastern terminus of US 92 and unsigned SR 600
Volusia	Daytona Beach	6.961	11.203	Main Street (CR 4040 west)	Eastern terminus of unsigned CR 4040
Volusia	Daytona Beach	7.627	12.274	SR 430 west (Seabreeze Boulevard)	Eastern terminus of SR 430
Volusia	Ormond Beach	11.856	19.080	SR 40 west (East Granada Boulevard) to I-95 / US 1	Eastern terminus of SR 40
Volusia	Ormond-by-the-Sea	20.668	33.262	Highbridge Road (CR 2002 west)	Eastern terminus of unsigned CR 2002
Flagler	Flagler Beach	25.928	41.727	SR 100 west (Moody Boulevard) to I-95 – Bunnell	Eastern terminus of SR 100
Flagler	Hammock Dunes	33.820	54.428	Camino Del Mar to I-95	to Hammock Dunes Bridge
St. Johns	Summer Haven	43.2	69.5	Matanzas Inlet Bridge over Matanzas Inlet	
St. Johns	Crescent Beach	47.907	77.099	SR 206 west to I-95 – Hastings	Eastern terminus of SR 206
St. Johns	St. Augustine Beach	51.855	83.453	A1A Beach Boulevard (CR A1A north) – St. Augustine Beach	Southern terminus of unsigned CR A1A
St. Johns	St. Augustine	54.337	87.447	SR 312 west to US 1 / I-95 / A1A Beach Boulevard (CR A1A south) – St. Augustine Beach	Northern terminus of unsigned CR A1A (St. Johns County section); Eastern terminus of SR 312
St. Johns	St. Augustine	57.4	92.4	Bridge of Lions over Matanzas River	
St. Johns	St. Augustine	57.591	92.684	US 1 Bus. south (Cathedral Place / SR 5A) to US 1	Southern end of concurrency with Business US 1
St. Johns	St. Augustine	58.877	94.753	San Carlos Avenue to US 1	
St. Johns	St. Augustine	58.909	94.805	US 1 Bus. north (San Marco Avenue / SR 5A) – Jacksonville	Northern terminus of concurrency with Business US 1
St. Johns	Vilano Beach	60.2	96.9	Vilano Causeway over Tolomato River	
St. Johns	Mickler Landing	78.027	125.572	CR 203 north (Ponte Vedra Boulevard) / Mickler Road	Southern terminus of CR 203
St. Johns	Palm Valley	80.770	129.987	CR 210 west (Palm Valley Road)	
St. Johns	Ponte Vedra Beach	82.265	132.393	Corona Road (CR 210 east)	unsigned CR 210
St. Johns	Ponte Vedra Beach	83.051	133.658	Solana Road (CR 210A west) – Palm Valley, Ponte Vedra Beach	unsigned CR 210A
Duval	Jacksonville Beach	85.03	136.84	SR 202 west (Butler Boulevard) to I-95 – Jacksonville	Interchange; Eastern terminus of SR 202
Duval	Jacksonville Beach	87.299	140.494	US 90 west (Beach Boulevard / SR 212)	Eastern terminus of US 90 and unsigned SR 212
Duval	Neptune Beach–Atlantic Beach line	89.833	144.572	Atlantic Boulevard	south end of SR 10 overlap
Duval	Neptune Beach–Atlantic Beach line	91.11	146.63	SR 10 west (Atlantic Boulevard) / Florida Boulevard – Jacksonville	Interchange; Western terminus of concurrency with SR 10
Duval	Jacksonville	93.376	150.274	SR 101 north (Mayport Road) – Naval Station Mayport Main Entrance, Hanna Park	Southern terminus of SR 101
Duval	Jacksonville	94.368	151.871	SR 116 (Wonderwood Road)	
Duval	Jacksonville	96.827	155.828	Mayport Ferry across St. Johns River	
Duval	Jacksonville	0.000	0.000	SR 105 south (Heckscher Drive) – Jacksonville	south end of SR 105 overlap
Duval	Jacksonville	2.2	3.5	Bridge over Fort George River Inlet	
Nassau Sound		10.4	16.7	Nassau Sound Bridge	
Nassau		16.064	25.853	Buccaneer Trail (CR 105A north)	roundabout; unsigned CR 105A
Nassau	Fernandina Beach	19.733	31.757	CR 108 west (Sadler Road)	roundabout; eastern terminus of CR 108
Nassau	Fernandina Beach	21.757	35.014	Fletcher Avenue	north end of SR 105 overlap; south end of SR 200 overlap
Nassau	see SR 200 (mile 155.816-127.867)				
Nassau	Callahan	49.706	79.994	US 1 / US 23 / US 301 (SR 15 / SR 200 west)	Western terminus of concurrency with SR 200
1.000 mi = 1.609 km; 1.000 km = 0.621 mi: Concurrency terminus; Incomplete access; Route transition

== County Road A1A ==
County Road A1A
- Location: Palm Beach, Martin, Volusia, and St. Johns counties
- Length: 32.68 mi (52.59 km)

County Road A1A is a county road in four counties in the U.S. state of Florida. The route is discontinuous and functions as a spur of State Road A1A.

=== Palm Beach County ===
CR A1A in Palm Beach County is a former routing of SR A1A through Juno Beach and Jupiter. It serves as a paralleling alternate route to Federal Highway (US 1), and is often erroneously signed as SR A1A despite its official county designation and maintenance.

=== Martin County ===
The longest of the four county spurs, County Road A1A is 15.88-mile (25.56 km) that runs along the Florida East Coast Railroad main line from Jonathan Dickinson State Park in Hobe Sound to Stuart, where it suddenly changes course and runs east along the south coast of the St. Lucie River. After the terminus of SR 714, it approaches the Evans Crary Bridge separating Stuart and Sewall's Point and becomes SR A1A.

=== Volusia County ===
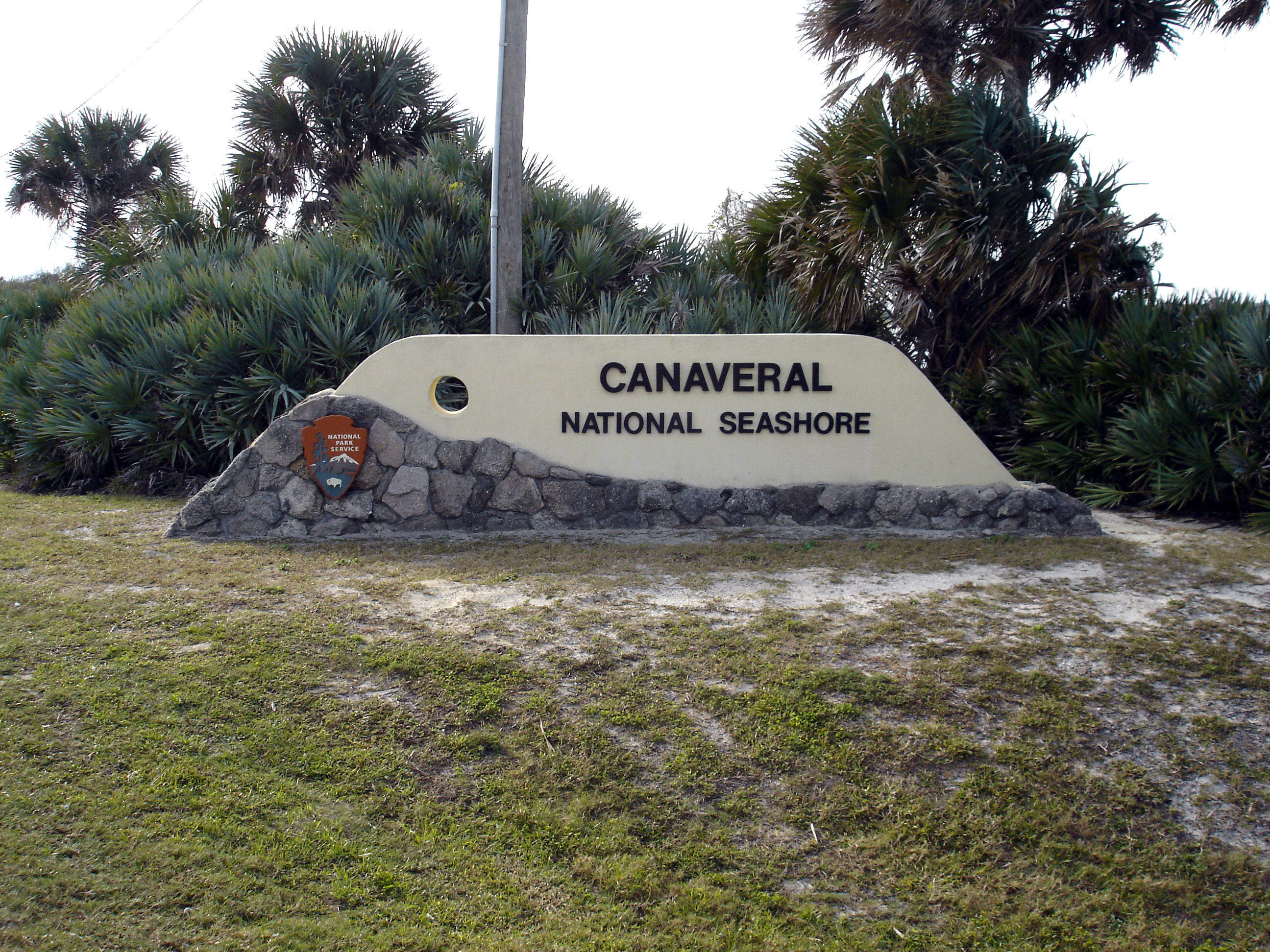
Entrance of Canaveral National Seashore from CR A1A.

County Road A1A is a 7-mile (11 km) spur route of State Road A1A in Volusia County, Florida, United States. The route begins at 6th Avenue on the beachside of New Smyrna Beach, Florida at the southern terminus of a segment of State Road A1A. At the intersection of 27th Avenue, the road becomes 2 lanes wide. Less than a mile south of New Smyrna Beach, Saxon Drive ends. At Bethune Beach, the road slightly turns away from the Atlantic Ocean. The road becomes Turtle Mound Road at that point. After Bethune Beach, the road is midway between the Intracoastal Waterway and the Atlantic Ocean. At this point, a gate brings access to Canaveral National Seashore. It passes through the ghost town of Eldora. The road ends as a dead end at a beach.

=== St. Johns County ===
County Road A1A is a 3.40-mile (5.47 km) spur route of SR A1A in St. Augustine Beach that runs closer to the Atlantic Ocean than SR A1A. It runs northeast from SR A1A, but begins to straighten out between John Drive and a private driveway south of F Street. The closest thing resembling a major intersection is 16th Street. After passing by the St. Johns County Ocean Pier, the road intersects Pope Road and leaves the city limits, where it enters Anastasia State Park, and makes a sharp curve to the west. Once the road leaves the park, it features an exceptionally long west-to-north turning ramp towards SR A1A, but ends at the intersection of SRs A1A and 312.

== References in popular culture ==
- A1A is mentioned in the 1990 Vanilla Ice song Ice Ice Baby with the lyrics "A1A (Beachfront Avenue)"; in Miami's South Beach, A1A is named Collins Avenue, but "Beachfront Avenue" is a common nickname.
- A1A is the title of a 1974 album by Jimmy Buffett; one of the album's tracks, "Trying to Reason with Hurricane Season", also mentions the road. In 2024, A1A from Key West to the Georgia border was designated the Jimmy Buffett Memorial Highway.
