= Ayay =

Ayay may refer to:

- The aye-aye, a species of lemur
- The Eyeish, a Native American tribe
- Aiyura Airport, in Papua New Guinea

For the nautical phrase, see Yes and no#Aye and variants. See also AIAI.
