= Palm Beach Gardens, Florida =

City in Florida, United States

- City
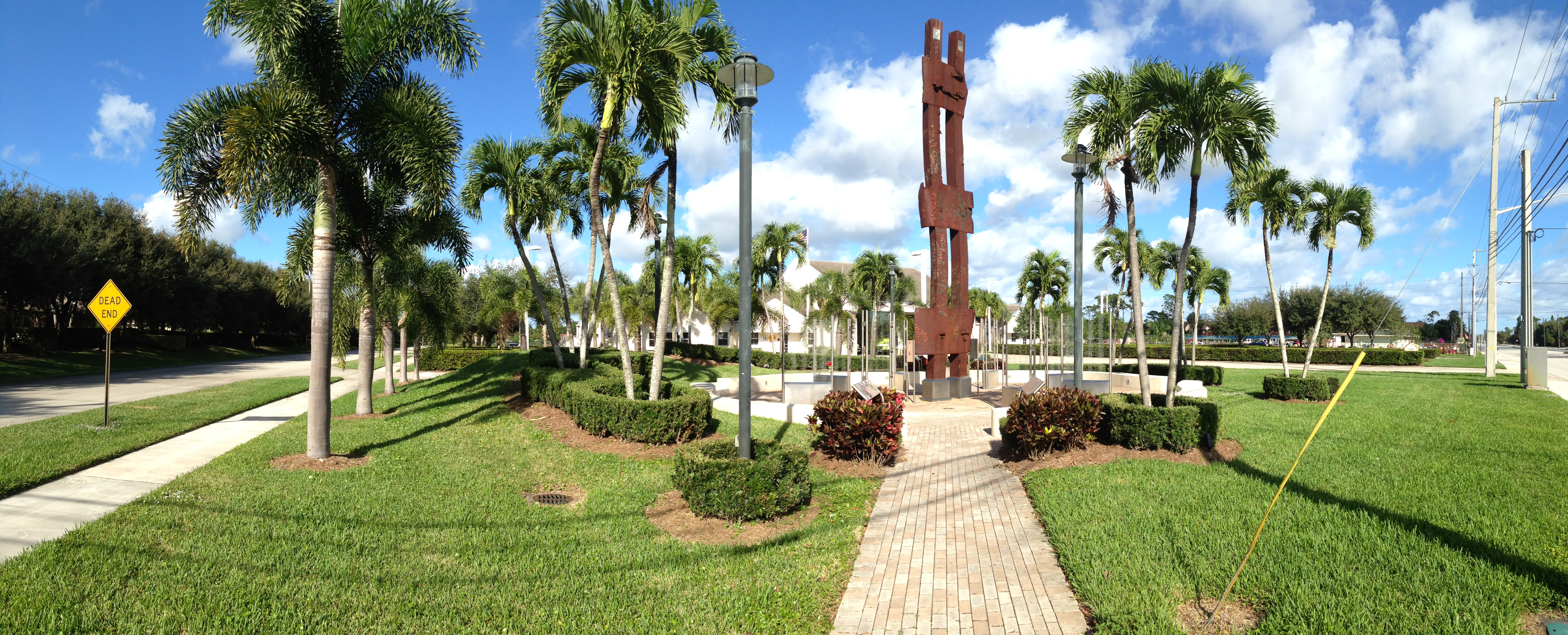
- 9/11 Memorial Plaza

- Logo
- Nicknames: The Gardens, PBG, The Golf Capital of the World
- Mottoes: "A Signature City" "A Unique Place to Live, Learn, Work, and Play!"
- Location of Palm Beach Gardens, Florida
- Coordinates: 26°50′48″N 80°10′05″W
- Country: United States
- State: Florida
- County: Palm Beach
- Incorporated: June 20, 1959

Government
  - Type: Council–Manager
  - Mayor: Dana Middleton
  - Vice Mayor: John Kemp
  - Councilmembers: Marcie Tinsley; Rachelle Litt; Robert G. Premuroso
  - City manager: Ronald "Ron" M. Ferris
  - City Clerk: Patricia Snider

Area
  - Total: 59.867 sq mi (155.055 km^{2})
  - Land: 59.241 sq mi (153.434 km^{2})
  - Water: 0.626 sq mi (1.621 km^{2}) 1.05%
- Elevation: 16 ft (4.9 m)

Population (2020)
  - Total: 59,182
  - Estimate (2025): 63,883
  - Rank: US: 633rd FL: 48th
  - Density: 1,041.4/sq mi (402.09/km^{2})
- Time zone: UTC−5 (Eastern (EST))
  - Summer (DST): UTC−4 (EDT)
- ZIP Codes: 33403, 33408, 33410, 33412, 33418, 33420
- Area codes: 561 and 728
- FIPS code: 12-54075
- GNIS feature ID: 2404464
- Sales tax: 7.0%
- Website: pbgfl.gov

Palm Beach Gardens is a city in Palm Beach County, Florida, United States, approximately 80 miles (130 km) north of Miami. Palm Beach Gardens is a principal city of the Miami metropolitan area. The population was 59,182 at the 2020 census, and was estimated to be 63,883 in 2023.

== History ==
=== Early history to 1970 ===
Prior to development, the land that became Palm Beach Gardens was primarily cattle ranches and pine forests, as well as swampland farther west. The first settlers in the 1890s were residents of Juno, what is now Juno Beach, near what is now the Oakbrook Square Shopping Center near US Highway 1 and PGA Boulevard. By the early 1900s, two other areas in what is now considered Palm Beach Gardens were settled—Prairie Siding, a railroad station and timber mill located at the present-day intersection of RCA Boulevard and Alternate A1A; and Kelsey City, named after magnate Harry Kelsey, who purchased 100,000 acres (400 km^{2}) of land that would become North Palm Beach, Palm Beach Gardens, and Lake Park. In 1959, wealthy landowner and insurance magnate John D. MacArthur announced plans to develop 4,000 acres (16 km^{2}) and build homes for 55,000 people. He chose the name Palm Beach Gardens after his initial choice, Palm Beach City, was denied by the Florida Legislature, because of the similarity of the name to the nearby Palm Beach. MacArthur planned to build a "garden city" so he altered the name slightly. The city was incorporated as a "paper town" (meaning that it existed only on paper) in 1959. The 1960 Census recorded that the city officially had a population of one inhabitant: 71-year old Charles Cooper, who lived in a shack without running water or electricity. According to Cooper, MacArthur had made a deal with him that "If he set fire to the old shack, I would fix him... in a house that would have running water, a toilet, and septic tank to let him live decently." Cooper's shack burned down in 1960; by 1970 he was living in a frame house provided by MacArthur.

Rapid development took place in the late 1950s into the 1960s. On August 13, 1958, the Beeline Highway was opened to the public connecting Indiantown with West Palm Beach; its construction included the laying of sod and hay on the swale of the highway by Seminole Indians. In 1959, the main entrance to Palm Beach Gardens was located at Northlake and Garden (now MacArthur) Boulevards; to mark the location, in 1961 MacArthur purchased and transplanted an 80-year-old banyan tree located in nearby Lake Park, that was to be cut down to enlarge a dentist's office. The tree was 60 feet high and weighed about 75 tons, and cost $30,000 and 1,008 hours of manpower to move it. A second banyan was moved the following year. While moving the first banyan tree over the Florida East Coast Railway, the massive tree shifted and disconnected the Western Union telephone and telegraph lines running adjacent to the railroad, cutting off most communications between Miami, 78 miles (126 km) to the south, and the outside world until the damage could be repaired. When questioned about the time and expense of moving the older trees instead of planting new ones, MacArthur responded "I can buy anything but age. This tree will be the centerpiece of the city's entrance, and while we could plant a little one, I wouldn't be around 80 years from now to see it as it should be." These trees still remain at the center of MacArthur Boulevard near Northlake Boulevard and are still featured on the city shield. In January 2007, the great-grandson of impressionist artist Pierre-Auguste Renoir, Alexandre Renoir, presented a painting to the city which depicts the Gardens banyan tree. It is currently on display at the city hall on North Military Trail. The banyan tree became a symbol of MacArthur's efforts to build a "garden city", with MacArthur claiming "I built Palm Beach Gardens without knocking one tree down. There are some bearded jerks and little old ladies who call me a despoiler of the environment. But I believe I have more concern than the average person." In 1968, the Bonnette Hunt Club Lodge was built on Hood Road, and became famous for having some of the best quail hunting in Florida; it remains in operation today though its hunting grounds have since become developed into the golf courses for Mirasol Country Club. Named after retired Navy warrant officer William A. Bonnette, the club attracted famous guests and members including King Hussein of Jordan, Bing Crosby, Peter Pulitzer, and others.

The city's governmental, infrastructure, and public safety facilities grew significantly throughout the 1960s. The Palm Beach Gardens Fire Department was chartered on October 9, 1963, operating from a garage at the present-day location of the fire station at Burns Road and Military Trail, and utilizing an old pickup truck with hose donated by MacArthur. In 1965, a volunteer police reserve force was created, and the following year Herbert A. Pecht was appointed first chief of police. The department had three air-conditioned patrol cars, and was connected to other South Florida cities by a then-advanced teletype network system. On April 26, 1965, a new exit interchange of the Sunshine State Parkway (later renamed the Florida Turnpike in 1968) was dedicated in the city at PGA Boulevard; MacArthur financed the project and was instrumental in lobbying for it. In 1966, the first two-lane drawbridge spanning the Intracoastal Waterway was also completed at PGA Boulevard, linking US-1 and Juno Beach to Palm Beach Gardens. Due to its many closings and construction delays during its subsequent expansion to four lanes (completed in 1982), the PGA bridge became known to locals as the "Please Go Around bridge".

Commercial growth also came rapidly to the region. The city's first commercial building permit was issued to RCA in 1960, for the construction of a factory. On May 25, 1961, RCA opened a $4 million plant for manufacturing personal computers at the western end of Monet Road (now RCA Boulevard). At its peak in the 1960s, the plant would employ over 3,400 workers before closing in 1972. . Pratt & Whitney, the aerospace technology corporation, would also build facilities along a 7,000-acre site located in the drained Everglades swamplands west of the Beeline Highway. Opening on June 15, 1958, the Pratt & Whitney plant developed rocket and jet engines for the U.S. military and would eventually employ nearly 9,000 workers at its peak, making it the largest employer in the county until the mid-1990s. To support the development of its nascent commercial growth, the city provided homes for many of the employees.

=== 1970–1990: City facilities expansion ===
By 1970 the city had a population approaching 7,000 people. City growth was slow but steady throughout the 1970s and 1980s, as the population had still not reached the predicted 55,000 people envisioned by MacArthur. The 1970s saw the first hotel (a Holiday Inn, now the site of the Doubletree Hotel), first supermarket, first apartment rental community, first shopping center, first multistory office building (The Admiralty Building) and the construction of the North County Courthouse Complex. Governmental and services structure continued to grow, with councils throughout the 1970s focusing on city facilities expansion. In 1970, construction began on the City of Palm Beach Gardens Municipal Complex. In recognition of his patronage of the city, MacArthur was made honorary mayor by the city council in 1972. Garden Boulevard, the location of his transplanted banyan trees, was renamed MacArthur Boulevard in his honor on July 4, 1972, over MacArthur's temporary opposition (having stated in a letter to Mayor Walter Wiley just two days prior, "I had no interest in having a street named after me, or I would have done so when I named all the streets."). It would become the city's first historical district. By 1980, the city council had elected its first woman councilmember, Linda Monroe, who would later go on to serve as the city's first female mayor.

On July 3, 1976, the expansion of I-95 to connect Palm Beach Gardens with Miami was completed and opened to the public. Ending at PGA Boulevard, it would not be until Dec. 19, 1987 that the final 44-mile "missing link" between PGA Boulevard and Ft. Pierce would be finished—completing the final gap in the 1,919 miles of the interstate highway between Miami and Maine. In 1979, Sikorsky Aircraft opened a facility at the Pratt & Whitney site along the Beeline Highway, where it would make, improve, and test helicopters including the UH-60 Black Hawk, S-92, and the RAH-66 Comanche. In 1978 ground broke on the construction of the PGA National Resort Community, under developer E. Llwyd Ecclestone on 2340 acres of land acquired from MacArthur. The master-planned community was estimated to cost $500 million at the time, with a target of 6900 homes to construct over a 15-year period, as well as an office park, shopping center, light industrial zone, and golf courses. The community would become the new permanent home of the Professional Golfers' Association of America.

In 1983, the city's first community recreation center was built on Burns Road. The opening of the 1,400,000-square-foot (130,000 m^{2}) Gardens of the Palm Beaches (subsequently shortened to The Gardens Mall) in 1988—then Florida's largest mall with 150 stores anchored by Burdines, Sears and Macy's—initiated a new wave of development; as did the sell off in 1999 of approximately 5,000 acres (20 km^{2}) in the city by the MacArthur Foundation. Development of this property happened quickly and led to much new growth in the city, particularly with further improvement of roads, additional parks, and the expansion of the north campus of Palm Beach Junior College into Palm Beach Community College. As a condition for approval of development on the Gardens Mall, the developers were required to build a second fire station (now Fire Station No. 2) at Campus Drive and RCA Boulevard. On January 1, 1995, the Palm Beach Gardens Fire Department became the provider of emergency medical services in the city. By 1989, growth was so rapid that there were five hotels under construction or completed that year alone. Thousands of homes and commercial properties were developed during this time by a small handful of developers with close associations to MacArthur, including Otto "Buz" DiVosta, Vince Pappalardo, and Seymour A. "Sy" Fine. The city adopted an Art in Public Places ordinance in 1989 and has amassed an eclectic collection of works. The city suffered much damage to its tropical landscaping in the hard freezes of 1985 and 1989, but has experienced no freezing temperatures since then.

=== 1990–present ===
The city was hit by Hurricane Frances, Hurricane Jeanne, and Hurricane Wilma in 2004 and 2005. Much of the city lost power for days at a time after each storm, and many traffic signals and directional signs in the city were destroyed. Many homes and businesses were severely damaged during the first two storms and contractors and construction materials were at a premium. Hundreds of homes were only nearing final repair when Hurricane Wilma hit the following year damaging or destroying many of those completed or ongoing repairs. In 1993, the Palm Beach Gardens Police SWAT team was formed to execute high-risk warrants, barricaded suspects, and hostage situations. On June 7, 2011, the city dedicated a new Emergency Operations and Communications Center to provide emergency response services for Palm Beach Gardens, Jupiter, and Juno Beach.

The Gardens Mall, PGA Commons, Midtown, Legacy Place, and Downtown at the Gardens are the center of the city's retail market. They are located on the municipality's main stretch on PGA Boulevard.

In 2000, construction was completed on a renovation of the city's municipal complex.

== Geography ==
According to the United States Census Bureau, the city has an area of 59.867 square miles (155.05 km^{2}), of which 59.241 square miles (153.43 km^{2}) is land and 0.626 square miles (1.62 km^{2}), or 1.05%, is water.

=== Climate ===
Palm Beach Gardens has a tropical rainforest climate (Köppen: Af) with long, hot, and rainy summers and short, warm winters with mild nights.

Climate data for Palm Beach Gardens, Florida, 1991–2020 normals, extremes 2002–present
Month	Jan	Feb	Mar	Apr	May	Jun	Jul	Aug	Sep	Oct	Nov	Dec	Year
Record high °F (°C)	85 (29)	92 (33)	90 (32)	93 (34)	94 (34)	96 (36)	96 (36)	98 (37)	95 (35)	93 (34)	92 (33)	88 (31)	98 (37)
Mean maximum °F (°C)	82.9 (28.3)	84.7 (29.3)	85.9 (29.9)	88.4 (31.3)	90.7 (32.6)	93.2 (34.0)	93.5 (34.2)	93.7 (34.3)	91.7 (33.2)	89.9 (32.2)	86.0 (30.0)	83.3 (28.5)	94.5 (34.7)
Mean daily maximum °F (°C)	75.0 (23.9)	75.2 (24.0)	77.2 (25.1)	81.4 (27.4)	84.1 (28.9)	87.8 (31.0)	89.2 (31.8)	89.4 (31.9)	88.0 (31.1)	84.5 (29.2)	79.8 (26.6)	75.3 (24.1)	82.1 (27.8)
Daily mean °F (°C)	64.5 (18.1)	66.1 (18.9)	68.8 (20.4)	72.9 (22.7)	76.5 (24.7)	80.6 (27.0)	82.1 (27.8)	82.4 (28.0)	81.5 (27.5)	77.6 (25.3)	72.2 (22.3)	67.5 (19.7)	74.4 (23.6)
Mean daily minimum °F (°C)	55.5 (13.1)	57.0 (13.9)	60.4 (15.8)	64.4 (18.0)	68.9 (20.5)	73.4 (23.0)	75.0 (23.9)	75.3 (24.1)	74.9 (23.8)	70.6 (21.4)	64.5 (18.1)	59.6 (15.3)	66.6 (19.2)
Mean minimum °F (°C)	39.7 (4.3)	42.2 (5.7)	47.3 (8.5)	54.7 (12.6)	61.0 (16.1)	69.8 (21.0)	70.9 (21.6)	71.7 (22.1)	70.7 (21.5)	59.5 (15.3)	50.4 (10.2)	46.2 (7.9)	37.4 (3.0)
Record low °F (°C)	31 (−1)	32 (0)	39 (4)	41 (5)	51 (11)	62 (17)	60 (16)	67 (19)	62 (17)	47 (8)	40 (4)	29 (−2)	29 (−2)
Average precipitation inches (mm)	3.38 (86)	2.64 (67)	3.76 (96)	3.18 (81)	6.36 (162)	9.22 (234)	7.23 (184)	8.28 (210)	8.38 (213)	5.96 (151)	3.85 (98)	3.76 (96)	66.00 (1,676)
Average precipitation days (≥ 0.01 in)	6.2	5.4	5.5	6.0	8.9	12.8	13.6	15.5	13.9	10.6	7.8	6.8	113.0
Source 1: NOAA (mean maxima/minima 2006–2020)
Source 2:

== Demographics ==
Historical population
Census	Pop.	Note	%±
1960	1		—
1970	6,102		610,100.0%
1980	14,407		136.1%
1990	22,965		59.4%
2000	35,058		52.7%
2010	48,452		38.2%
2020	59,182		22.1%
2025 (est.)	63,883	▲	7.9%
U.S. Decennial Census; 2020 Census

As of the 2023 American Community Survey, there are 26,283 estimated households in Palm Beach Gardens with an average of 2.25 persons per household. The city has a median household income of $110,563. Approximately 6.1% of the city's population lives at or below the poverty line. Palm Beach Gardens has an estimated 57.5% employment rate, with 56.7% of the population holding a bachelor's degree or higher and 96.9% holding a high school diploma.

The top five reported ancestries (people were allowed to report up to two ancestries, thus the figures will generally add to more than 100%) were English (83.4%), Spanish (6.9%), Indo-European (6.8%), Asian and Pacific Islander (2.2%), and Other (0.7%).

=== Racial and ethnic composition ===
Palm Beach Gardens, Florida – racial and ethnic composition Note: the US Census treats Hispanic/Latino as an ethnic category. This table excludes Latinos from the racial categories and assigns them to a separate category. Hispanics/Latinos may be of any race.
Race / ethnicity (NH = non-Hispanic)	Pop. 2000	Pop. 2010	Pop. 2020	% 2000	% 2010	% 2020
White alone (NH)	31,252	39,861	45,353	89.14%	82.27%	76.63%
Black or African American alone (NH)	736	2,050	2,282	2.10%	4.23%	3.86%
Native American or Alaska Native alone (NH)	34	58	33	0.10%	0.12%	0.06%
Asian alone (NH)	754	1,481	2,597	2.15%	3.06%	4.39%
Native Hawaiian or Pacific Islander alone (NH)	2	17	10	0.01%	0.04%	0.02%
Other race alone (NH)	49	95	246	0.14%	0.20%	0.42%
Mixed race or multiracial (NH)	258	576	1,902	0.74%	1.19%	3.21%
Hispanic or Latino (any race)	1,973	4,314	6,759	5.63%	8.90%	11.42%
Total	35,058	48,452	59,182	100.00%	100.00%	100.00%

=== 2020 census ===
As of the 2020 census, Palm Beach Gardens had a population of 59,182, with 27,416 households and 16,742 families. The population density was 1,008.0 inhabitants per square mile (389.2/km^{2}). The median age was 53.2 years; 14.6% of residents were under the age of 18 and 32.7% of residents were 65 years of age or older.

For every 100 females there were 87.4 males, and for every 100 females age 18 and over there were 84.4 males age 18 and over.

Of the 27,416 households, 19.0% had children under the age of 18 living in them. Of all households, 48.6% were married-couple households, 15.7% were households with a male householder and no spouse or partner present, and 29.4% were households with a female householder and no spouse or partner present. About 31.9% of all households were made up of individuals and 16.9% had someone living alone who was 65 years of age or older.

There were 31,130 housing units at an average density of 530.2 per square mile (204.7/km^{2}), of which 11.9% were vacant. The homeowner vacancy rate was 2.4% and the rental vacancy rate was 8.7%.

99.9% of residents lived in urban areas, while 0.1% lived in rural areas.

Racial composition as of the 2020 census
Race	Number	Percent
White	47,099	79.6%
Black or African American	2,335	3.9%
American Indian and Alaska Native	106	0.2%
Asian	2,637	4.5%
Native Hawaiian and Other Pacific Islander	18	0.0%
Some other race	1,524	2.6%
Two or more races	5,463	9.2%

=== 2010 census ===
As of the 2010 census, there were 48,452 people, 22,804 households, and _ families residing in the city. The population density was 879.5 inhabitants per square mile (339.6/km^{2}). There were 27,663 housing units at an average density of 502.1 per square mile (193.9/km^{2}). The racial makeup of the city was 89.30% White, 4.40% African American, 0.16% Native American, 3.11% Asian, 0.04% Pacific Islander, 1.37% from some other races and 1.62% from two or more races. Hispanic or Latino people of any race were 8.90% of the population.

=== 2000 census ===
As of 2000 census, there were 35,058 people, 15,599 households, and 10,217 families residing in the city. The population density was 629.6 inhabitants per square mile (243.1/km^{2}). There were 18,317 housing units at an average density of 329.0 per square mile (127.0/km^{2}). The racial makeup of the city was 93.78% White, 2.30% African American, 0.11% Native American, 2.15% Asian, 0.03% Pacific Islander, 0.67% from some other races and 0.96% from two or more races. Hispanic or Latino people of any race were 5.63% of the population.

There were 15,599 households out of which 23.4% had children under the age of 18 living with them, 53.8% were married couples living together, 8.9% had a female householder with no husband present, and 34.5% were non-families. 27.7% of all households were made up of individuals and 10.5% had someone living alone who was 65 years of age or older. The average household size was 2.23 and the average family size was 2.70.

In the city the population was spread out with 18.7% under the age of 18, 5.1% from 18 to 24, 26.3% from 25 to 44, 28.9% from 45 to 64, and 21.1% who were 65 years of age or older. The median age was 45 years. For every 100 females there were 90.0 males. For every 100 females age 18 and over, there were 86.4 males.

The median income for a household in the city was $59,776, and the median income for a family was $74,548. Males had a median income of $50,045 versus $33,221 for females. The per capita income for the city was $42,975. About 3.5% of families and 5.6% of the population were below the poverty line, including 6.9% of those under age 18 and 3.5% of those age 65 or over.

As of 2000, speakers of English as a first language accounted for 89.27% of all residents, while Spanish comprised 5.60%, Italian was at 1.00%, French made up 0.83%, and German was the mother tongue of 0.61% of the population. Eleven other languages are spoken in the city, each of which are reported at less than 0.5%.

== Emergency Services ==
=== Law Enforcement ===
The Palm Beach Gardens Police Department has 128 sworn officers, 61 non-sworn civilian staff, eight part-time personnel, and a volunteer force of both reserve officers and citizens mobile patrol members. Its operational divisions include Road Patrol, Traffic, K-9, Detective and Crime Scene Investigation, SWAT and Hostage Negotiation.

As of 2025, the Chief of Police is Dominick Pape. In 2016 a police officer was convicted for the killing of Corey Jones, an African American man awaiting a tow truck after his vehicle broke down in Palm Beach Gardens.

The Police Department provides protection to the city and also manages NorthComm - The North County Communications Center which handles emergency communications for the City of Palm Beach Gardens, the villages of Tequesta and North Palm Beach, and the towns of Jupiter, Juno Beach and Palm Beach Shores. When someone calls 9-1-1 in one of these locations, their call is routed to NorthComm and from there they notify the nearest available police unit.

The Palm Beach Gardens Police Foundation is a non-profit foundation holding IRS 501(c)(3) status. The Mission of the Palm Beach Gardens Police Foundation is to secure private funding to enhance the integrity of the community and the effectiveness of the Police Department. It does this by providing funding for innovative police department projects, that would not otherwise be funded from the city's budget.

=== Fire Rescue ===
The Palm Beach Gardens Fire Rescue Department has been serving the citizen's of the city since 1964. The department operates out of the following six stations located throughout the city:

- Station 61 - Battalion 61, EMS 61, Ladder 61, Rescue 61, Brush 561, Light/Air 61, Boat 61;
- Station 62 - Engine 62, Rescue 62;
- Station 63 - Engine 63, Rescue 63, Brush 563;
- Station 64 - Engine 64, Rescue 64, Truck 64;
- Station 65 - Engine 65, Rescue 65,
- Station 66 - Engine 66, Rescue 66, Brush 566.

On September 11, 2010, the city dedicated its "09.11.01 Memorial Plaza" at Fire Station 63 on Northlake Boulevard. The memorial commemorates the September 11, 2001 attacks. Its centerpiece is a steel section retrieved from the ruins of the World Trade Center in New York City.

== Government ==
The city charter provides for a council-manager government. The city council consists of five Palm Beach Gardens residents elected to serve three-year terms. A quorum of three members may conduct city business. The city manager is appointed by a majority vote of the council.

Each year, the council appoints one of its members to be mayor, and another to be vice-mayor.

== Transportation ==
In December 1987, the last "missing link" of Interstate 95 (I-95) opened between PGA Boulevard in Palm Beach Gardens and State Road 714, west of Stuart, paving the way for new development immediately to the north. There are three interchanges on I-95 serving the city and a fourth at Central Boulevard is under consideration. The city also is served by two interchanges on Florida's Turnpike.

Public transit is available to the rest of Palm Beach County through the regional commuter bus system Palm Tran. In addition, the South Florida Regional Transportation Authority has proposed extending the Tri-Rail commuter rail system northward with a proposed station near PGA Boulevard north of the current terminus at Mangonia Park. A trolley system is also proposed to serve the newly developed "Downtown" area.

The nearest major airports, with driving distances measured from Palm Beach Gardens city hall, are:

- West Palm Beach – 12 miles (19 km) south
- Fort Lauderdale – 58 miles (93 km) south
- Miami – 82 miles (132 km) south

The nearest general aviation airports are:

- North Palm Beach County – 12 miles (19 km) west
- Lantana – 20 miles (32 km) south
- Stuart – 28 miles (45 km) north
- Boca Raton – 36 miles (58 km) south

== Economy ==
=== Top employers ===
According to the city's 2023 Annual Comprehensive Financial Report, the largest employers in the city are:

#	Employer	# of Employees	Percentage
1	Palm Beach County School Board	922	1.52%
2	Tenet Healthcare Corp	900	1.48%
3	TBC Corporation	870	1.43%
4	ZimVie Dental & Spine	854	1.41%
5	G4S	850	1.40%
6	HCA Florida Healthcare	700	1.15%
7	City of Palm Beach Gardens	606	1.00%
8	Belcan Engineering Group	306	0.50%
9	Bank of America	296	0.49%
10	South Florida Water Management District	290	0.48%
—	Total	6,594	10.87%

== Education ==
All public K-12 primary and secondary schools are administrated by the School District of Palm Beach County.

Palm Beach Gardens Community High School and William T. Dwyer High School are the local public high schools. The Upper School campus of The Benjamin School is also located in Palm Beach Gardens.

The Edward M. Eissey Campus, a satellite campus of the Palm Beach State College, is located in Palm Beach Gardens. It includes the Eissey Theatre for the Performing Arts.

== Sport ==
There are 12 golf courses within the city limits, including a course owned by the municipality. The Professional Golfers' Association of America has its headquarters in the city.

The Honda Classic has been held at two Palm Beach Gardens locations: from 2003 to 2006 at the Country Club at Mirasol and since 2007 at the PGA National Resort and Spa. Also, the Senior PGA Championship was held at the current BallenIsles from 1964 to 1973, and at the PGA National Golf Club from 1982 to 2000. PGA National was also the site of the 1983 Ryder Cup and the 1987 PGA Championship.

In February 2018, the Palm Beach Gardens-based company FITTEAM concluded a 12-year deal with Major League Baseball′s Houston Astros and Washington Nationals giving it the naming rights to The Ballpark of the Palm Beaches – spring training home of the Astros and Nationals – in nearby West Palm Beach. The facility was renamed FITTEAM Ballpark of the Palm Beaches.

== Notable people ==
Some notable Palm Beach Gardens residents, past and present, include:

- Paul Goldschmidt (born 1987), baseball MLB first baseman and 2022 National League MVP
- Max Greyserman (born 1995), professional golfer on the PGA Tour
- Sally Ann Howes (1930–2021), English actress best known for her role as Truly Scrumptious in Chitty Chitty Bang Bang
- Dustin Johnson (born 1984), professional golfer on the PGA Tour
- Anirban Lahiri (born 1987), professional golfer on the Asian Tour and LIV Golf
- Jack Langer (born 1949), investment banker and former college basketball player for Yale University
- Thomas Levet (born 1968), professional golfer on the PGA European Tour
- Stacy Lewis (born 1985), professional golfer on the LPGA Tour
- Vincent Marotta (1924–2015), entrepreneur, co-developer of Mr. Coffee
- Grayson Murray (1993–2024), professional golfer.
- Ron Palillo (1949-2012), actor.
- Charl Schwartzel (born 1984), professional golfer on the Asian Tour, Sunshine Tour, and LIV Golf
- Loris Spinelli (born 1995), racing driver for IMSA SportsCar Championship
- Chris Volstad (born 1986), MLB pitcher
- Lee Westwood (born 1973), professional golfer on the PGA European Tour and PGA Tour
- Serena Williams (born 1981), tennis professional
- Venus Williams (born 1980), tennis professional
