= Sebastian Inlet Bridge =

Concrete bridge in Florida, United States

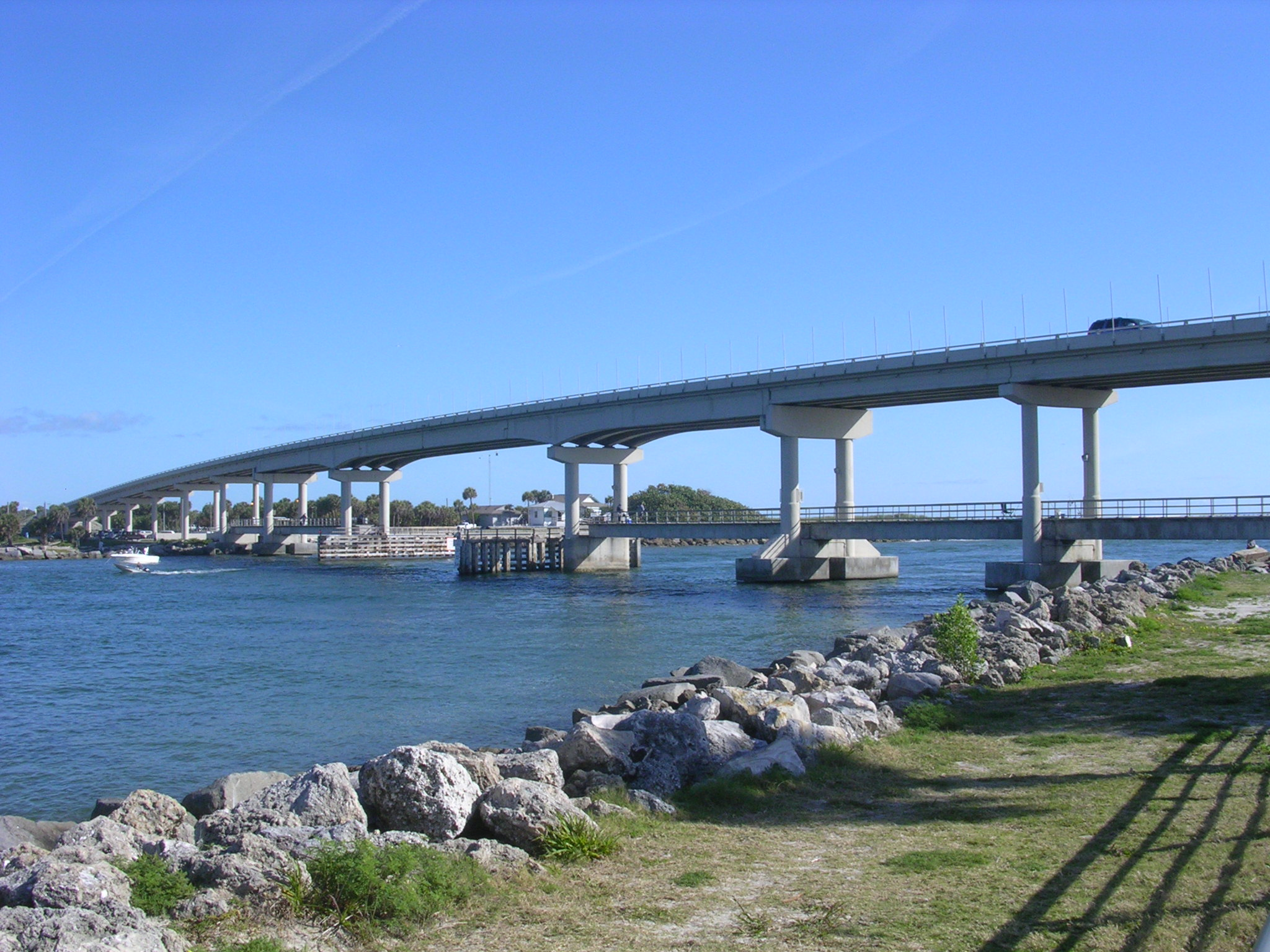
- Coordinates: 27.8602°N 80.4484°W
- Carries: SR A1A
- Crosses: Sebastian Inlet
- Locale: Indian River County, Florida-Brevard County, Florida

Characteristics
- Design: concrete deck
- Total length: 1548 ft
- Longest span: 180 ft

History
- Opened: 1965

Location
- Interactive map of Sebastian Inlet Bridge

The Sebastian Inlet Bridge is a high concrete bridge. It spans the Indian River outlet which is also referred to as the Sebastian Inlet. It carries State Road A1A between Indian River County and Brevard County.

The bridge was built by Cleary Brothers Construction Company, West Palm Beach, Florida, and was completed in 1964. A fishing-walking pier is constructed below the bridge and goes out the inlet along the jetty to the Atlantic.

The bridge has a total length of 1,548 feet (472 m) with a main span of 180 feet (55 m). The vertical clearance is 37 feet (11 m).

The Legislature of Florida dedicated the bridge to Robert W. Graves in 1965. In 2004 it was dedicated to James H. Pruitt.

The bridge was deemed "structurally deficient" by the FDOT, as a result of Hurricane Dorian. Officials recommended the 55-year-old bridge be repaired within six years as of 2019.
