= Florida State Road A1A Alternate =

State Road A1A Alternate

Location
- Country: United States
- State: Florida

Highway system
- Florida State Highway System; Interstate; US; State; Former; Pre‑1945; Toll; Scenic

State Road A1A Alternate (also Alternate A1A and Alternate State Road A1A) may refer to all or part of the following roads that had, at one time, this designation by the Florida Department of Transportation but have since been renumbered:

- Palm Beach County Road 707
- Florida State Road 732
- Florida State Road 811
- Las Olas Boulevard

All of the above contain parts of former alignments of State Road A1A.
