= AIAI =

AIAI or Aiai may refer to:

- Artificial Intelligence Applications Institute, a non-profit technology transfer organisation at the University of Edinburgh, 1983-2019
- Artificial Intelligence and its Applications Institute, a research institute in the School of Informatics at the University of Edinburgh, 2019-
- al-Itihaad al-Islamiya, a Somali Islamist group
- AiAi, a character in the Super Monkey Ball video game series

== See also ==
- AIA (disambiguation)
- AI (disambiguation)
- Aye-aye, a species of lemur
