= Playalinda Beach =

Beach in Florida, United States

- Beach
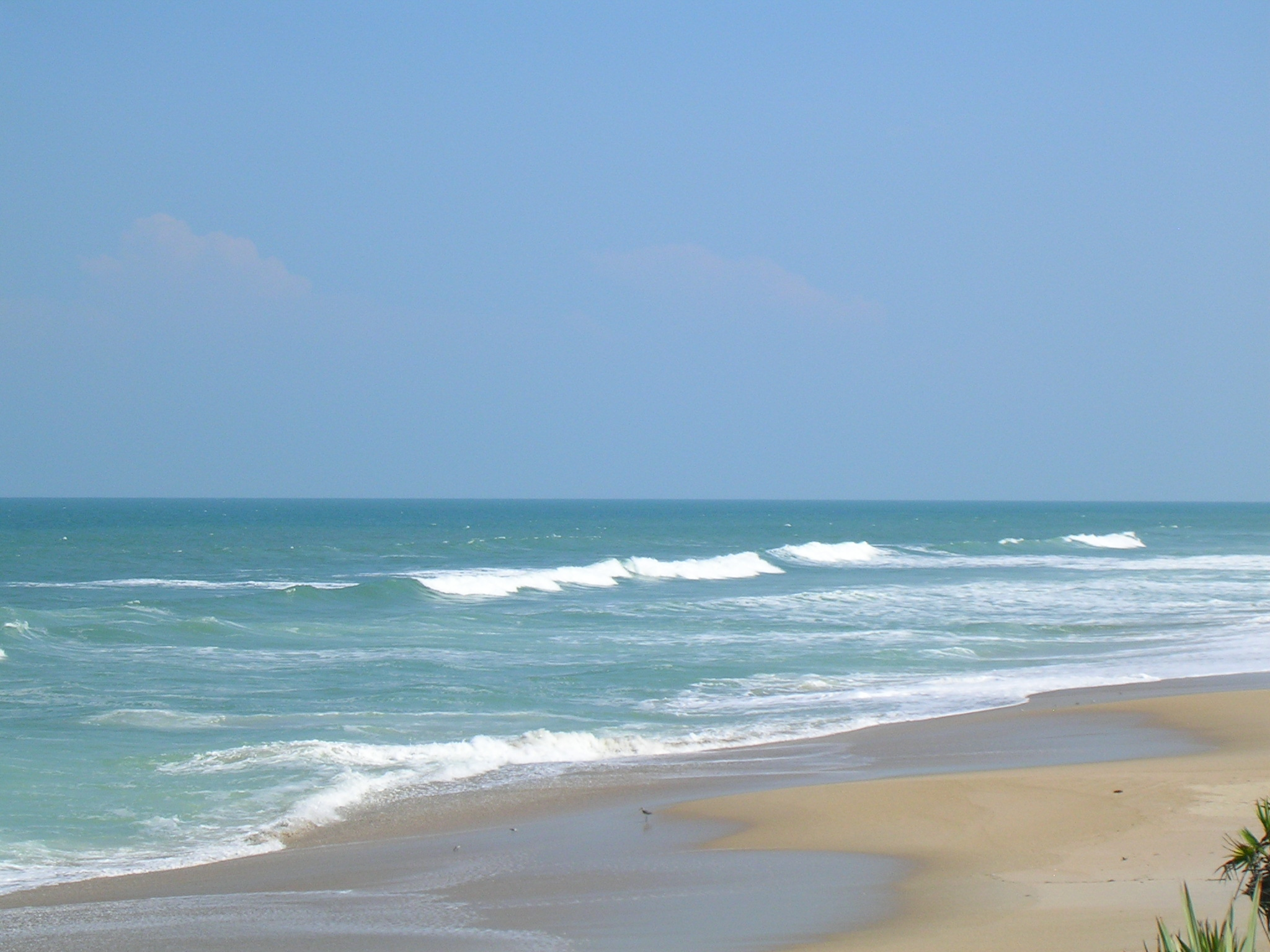
- Playalinda Beach in 2007

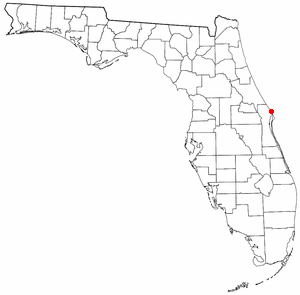
- Location of Playalinda Beach in Florida
- Location: Florida, United States
- Part of: Canaveral National Seashore
- Water bodies: Atlantic Ocean, Indian River Lagoon

Playalinda Beach (lit. 'pretty beach') is a beach located on Florida's east coast in Canaveral National Seashore near Titusville, Florida. It was formerly known as Titusville Beach.

== Geography ==
Playalinda Beach is on a barrier island separate from the mainland by the Indian River Lagoon. The first parking spot is located at 28.65438°N 80.63177°W. Canaveral National Seashore's 24 miles (39 km) of shoreline is the longest stretch of undeveloped public beach on the east coast of Florida. The stretch of drivable beach is just over 4 miles (6.4 km) long.

The barrier island is a thin ribbon of sand lying between the ocean and Mosquito Lagoon. In some places it is no more than 100 yards (91 m) wide. Unlike many barrier islands with primary and secondary dunes, Playalinda has only a single dune. The island provides an important buffer against tropical storms and hurricanes, absorbing the initial brunt of wind and waves.

== History ==
The area that is now Playalinda Beach was originally intended to be the site of Launch Complex 39 pads C, D and E. However, when the Apollo Moon Base concept was cancelled and funding for NASA decreased, the additional launch pads were also cancelled. In 1975, the federal government transferred the land from NASA to the National Park Service to become Canaveral National Seashore.

== Beach information ==
Playalinda is considered a surfing location by many of the locals.

Playalinda is accessible from Titusville, Florida. The beach is currently open to the public daily between 6:00 am to 6:00 pm. Access to the beach may be closed periodically in preparation for rocket launches from Cape Canaveral Space Force Station or the Kennedy Space Center, which are just south of Playalinda Beach. During launches, the sections that are not closed are a popular destination for rocket-watching.

Canaveral National Seashore has concurrent jurisdiction with both the state of Florida and its counties of Volusia and Brevard. Federal, State and County law enforcement officers may enforce any and all respective laws/ordinances that do not conflict with Federal laws and regulations.

Brevard County has an ordinance that prohibits nudity in public places. Playalinda Beach is within the jurisdiction of Brevard County thus the nudity ordinance is enforceable by county and state law officers as well as federal park rangers. The laws are rarely or erratically enforced, however, affording the beach a de facto clothing-optional status. This is only at the last parking location parking lot #13. A 2026 ranking of U.S. states by the number of natural beaches highlighted Playalinda Beach as the representative beach for Florida.

== Park fees ==
- Per vehicle : $25.00 per day
- Motorcycles: $20.00 per day
- Walk-in fee : $15.00 per day (bicycles, pedestrians, occupants of large non-commercial vehicles).
- CANA/MINWR annual pass: $40 (Valid at Canaveral National Seashore and Merritt Island Wildlife Refuge.
- America the Beautiful annual pass: $80 is available to anyone; gives access to more than 2,000 federal recreation sites.
- Senior pass: $80.00 Lifetime
