= America's Infrastructure Alliance =

American trade association

- Formation: March 2013
- Defunct: 2018
- Type: Nonprofit trade association
- Purpose: Transportation public policy issues and funding
- Location: Washington, D.C., United States
- Region served: United States
- Members: Representatives of US transportation companies and government entities
- Key people: Jeff Loveng (CEO and Chairman )
- Website: americasinfrastructure.org

America’s Infrastructure Alliance (AIA) was an American trade association whose stated mission was lobbying for increased federal investment in the national transportation system. The alliance appears to have ended in 2018 as its web site was closed and it has not filed and financial fillings since 2018.

It was structured as a not-for-profit 501(c) organization representing transportation companies in the United States. The group was made up of representatives from transportation and construction industry companies and the trade groups, Airlines for America, American Trucking Association, Association of American Railroads and Associated General Contractors.

Unlike traditional lobbying firms, which meet directly with lawmakers and policymakers in attempts to influence decision-making, the organization was focused directly on educating voters.

== History ==
The alliance was founded and incorporated in the District of Columbia on December 11, 2012. On March 19, 2013, AIA first announced itself as a new organization. (Note: any groups that focus primarily on advocating for single issues, such as the Sierra Club and National Rifle Association, are registered as 501c(4) organizations.)

=== Background ===
The American Society of Civil Engineers (ASCE) issues a report every four years called "The Report Card on America’s Infrastructure." The report published in March 2013 gave an improved score for the country as a whole for the first time in the 15 years: an improvement from a D to a D+.

In the United States, the federal government funds 25% of infrastructure activity; the remainder is paid by state and local governments.

== Advocacy ==
The organization's goals were focused on fixing the specific problem of deteriorating roads, bridges, and other transportation media in the United States. AIA's position was that the United States government should increase investment and rebuilding as a matter of constitutional obligation. AIA advocates against changing transportation spending from a federal government program to a state government program.

AIA advocated for increasing the gas tax in order to increase the federal budget for repairing and maintaining bridges, railroads and roads.

The AIA also advocated for passage of the Water Resources Reform and Development Act (WRRDA), which is a bill that gives authority for maintaining and developing port and waterway infrastructure to the U.S. Army Corps of Engineers.

== Governance ==
The AIA was governed by a board of directors comprising 6 individual members and an advisory board of companies from the airline, railroad, trucking and shipping industries.:

== See also ==
- List of industry trade groups in the United States
- Transportation infrastructure
