= Application Integration Architecture =

In computing, Application Integration Architecture (AIA) is an integration framework produced by Oracle Corporation.

Standards-based, AIA has pre-built common object definitions and services. Oracle AIA is built on Oracle Fusion Middleware's SOA and Business Process-Management (BPM) products.

AIA provides a foundation on which to build business-process flows. AIA delivers Pre-built Integrations as either Direct Integrations (DIs) or Process Integration Packs (PIPs).

- Direct Integrations (DIs): Pre-built integrations that manage data flows and data synchronizations between Applications.
- Process Integration Packs (PIPs): Help optimize processes; they are pre-built composite business processes across enterprise Applications. They allow companies to get up and running with core processes quickly. AIA and PIPs decrease software development time. PIPs operate both horizontally and vertically. Vertical PIPs cater to industries like telecoms, retail, and banking/insurance.

== Oracle AIA for Communications ==
Oracle AIA for Communications provide end-to-end, integrated business processes, applications, and technology for the Telecom industry. Oracle AIA for Communications provide three PIPs -

Order to Bill PIP - provides pre-built integration between Oracle Siebel CRM with Oracle BRM allowing for synchronization of customer, product and pricing data across these applications. Customer Service Reps (CSRs) can create accounts and submit Sales Orders which would synchronize automatically between the CRM and Billing systems in the Business support system (BSS) eco-system.

Order to Activate PIP - provide support for Lead to Cash and Concept to Market eTOM business processes by expediting the introduction of new product offerings, capturing and fulfilling orders efficiently and accurately, managing fallouts, and providing visibility across the entire order lifecycle. This is a part of the RODOD framework and typically spans across the following Oracle products - Siebel, BRM, AIA, OSM COM and OSM SOM. This PIP journeys the BSS as well as the OSS components.

Agent Assisted Billing Care PIP - provides pre-built integration for integration between Oracle Siebel CRM with Oracle BRM including usage and billing data maintained within Oracle BRM. This empowers CSRs to resolve billing queries faster, improving customer satisfaction.
