= Florida State Road 732 =

State highway in Florida, United States

State Road 732

Route information
- Maintained by FDOT
- Length: 4.111 mi (6.616 km)

Section 1
- Length: 2.213 mi (3.561 km)
- West end: US 1 in Jensen Beach
- East end: CR 707A / CR 723 in Jensen Beach

Section 2
- Length: 1.898 mi (3.055 km)
- West end: CR 707 in Jensen Beach
- East end: SR A1A in Jensen Beach

Location
- Country: United States
- State: Florida
- Counties: Martin

Highway system
- Florida State Highway System; Interstate; US; State; Former; Pre‑1945; Toll; Scenic
← SR 729	→ SR 736

State Road 732 (SR 732) comprises two segments of a state highway in the Jensen Beach, Florida vicinity. The western 2.2-mile-long (3.5 km) segment is a part of Jensen Beach Boulevard between U.S. Route 1 (US 1) and County Road 723 (CR 723) and CR 707A. The eastern 1.9-mile-long (3.1 km) segment consists of Causeway Boulevard and the Jensen Beach Causeway over the Indian River Lagoon and runs between CR 707 and SR A1A.

== Route description ==
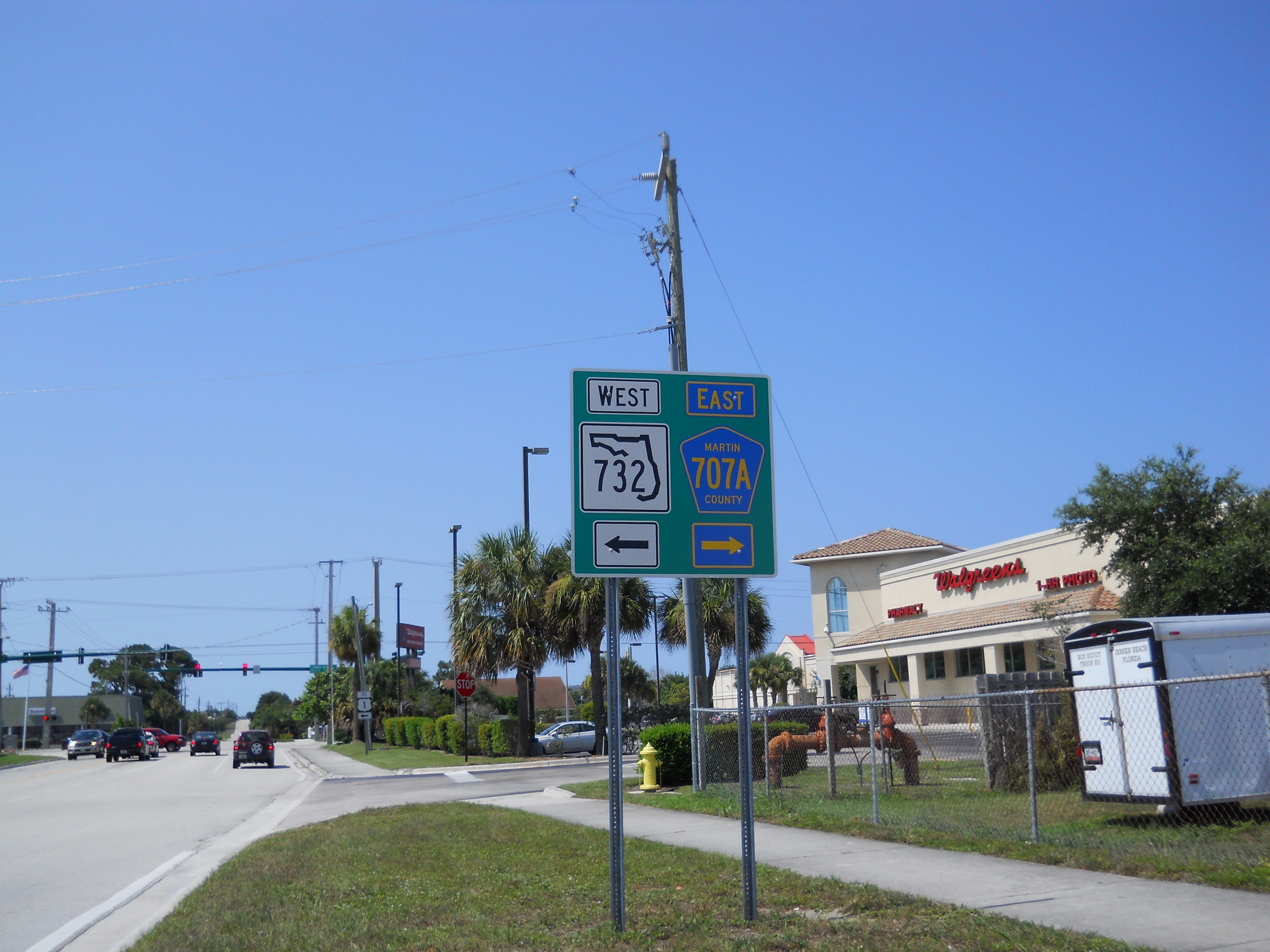
Sign just south of the intersection of NE Savannah Road and NE Jensen Beach Boulevard indicating junction of SR 732 to the west and CR 707A to the east

The eastern segment of SR 732 begins at the intersection of Federal Highway (US 1 and unsigned SR 5) and Jensen Beach Boulevard in northern unincorporated Martin County. Along US 1, the state road is signed as CR 732. The four-lane divided highway heads east along Jensen Beach Boulevard first in a commercial business area, then passing the entrance to a park and Jensen Beach High School, finally into a less developed area. The road provides the access to some housing developments and Savannas Preserve State Park. Nearly two miles (3.2 km) from its start, the divided highway ends, but the road remains a four-lane road with a center turn lane provided. More businesses begin to line the road. The state road ends at the signalized intersection of Savannah Road (CR 723) but Jensen Beach Boulevard continues east towards Ocean Breeze as CR 707A.

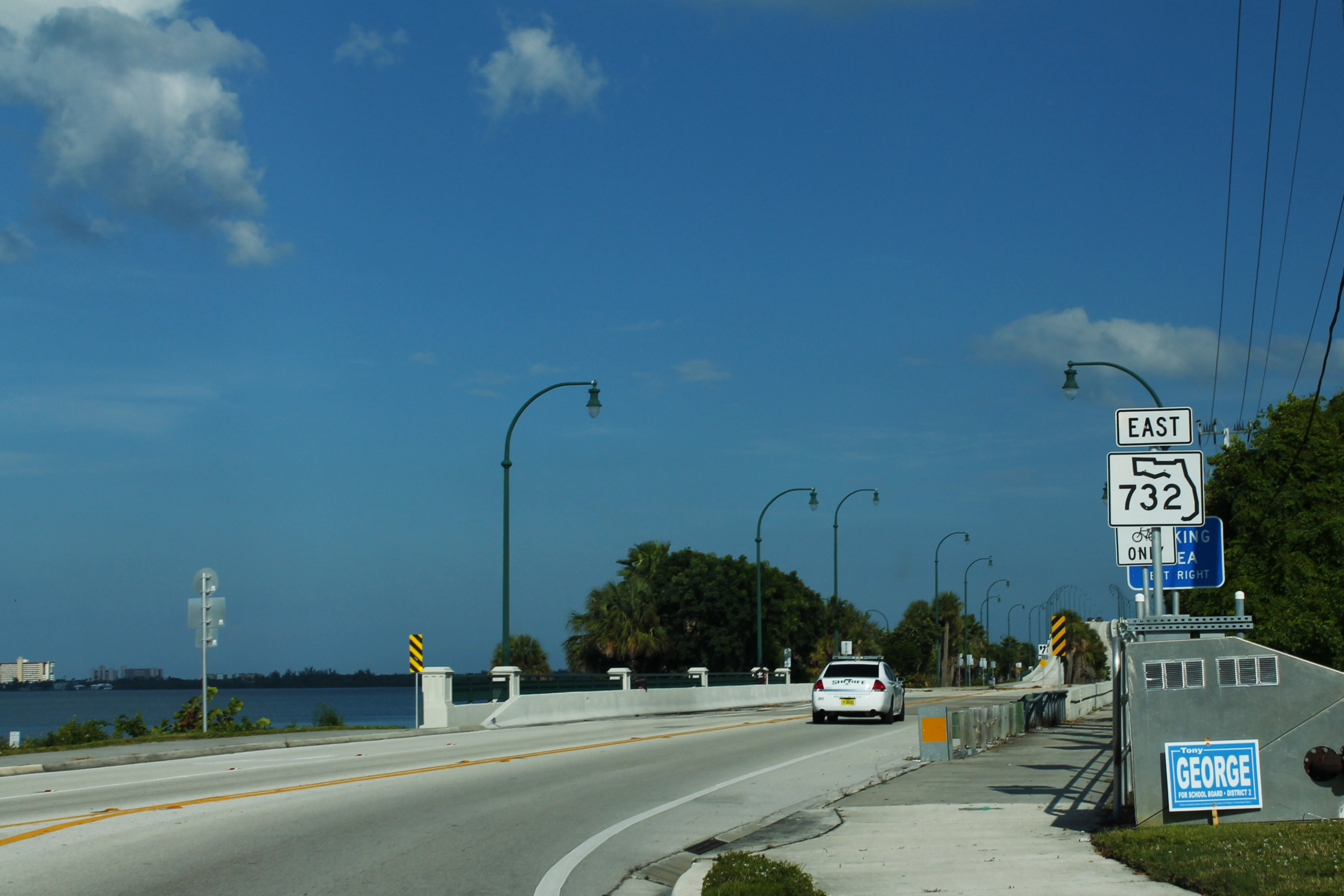
Signage on the eastern segment at the west end of the Jensen Beach Causeway

SR 732 resumes north of Ocean Breeze at a roundabout with NE Pineapple Avenue and NE Indian River Drive (CR 707). The road crosses a small inlet on a short bridge before landing on an island featuring the Jensen Beach Causeway Park. After park entrances on both sides of the road, the road crosses the main channel of the Indian River and the Intracoastal Waterway on the Frank A. Wacha Bridge. The east side of this bridge is another small island with parkland. After crossing a final inlet on a small bridge, SR 732 enters Hutchinson Island. Two entrances to housing complexes are provided on the road before the state road ends at a roundabout with Ocean Boulevard (SR A1A) and Jensen Sea Turtle Beach.

== History ==
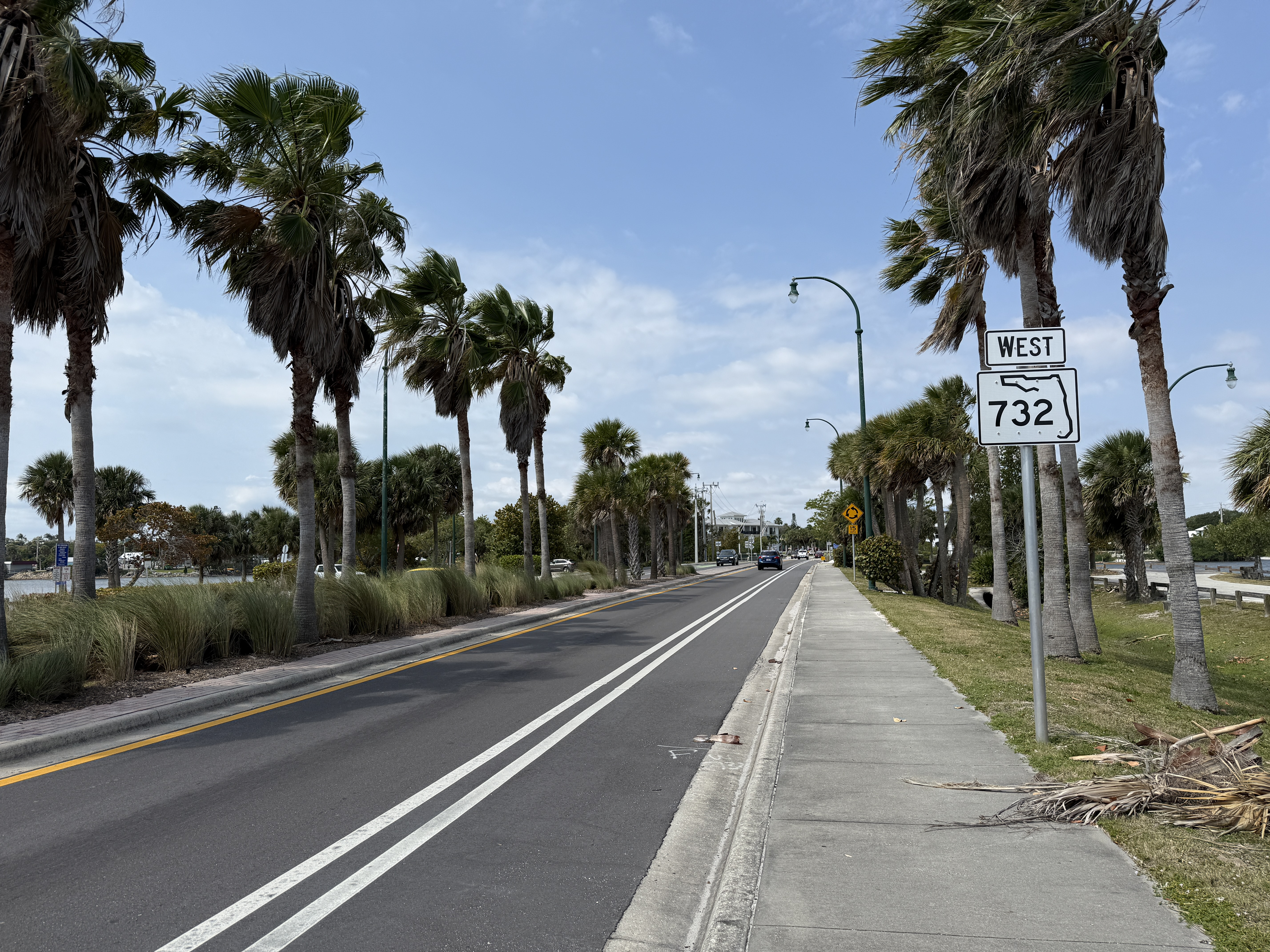
SR 732 westbound past Frank A. Wacha Bridge in Jensen Beach

In the late 1950s and early 1960s, SR A1A was only partially constructed along the barrier island between Stuart and Fort Pierce. In the interim, the present CR 707 (then part of SR 707) had "Temporary A1A" signs while both the present CR 707 and SR 732 were signed State Road A1A Alternate. When construction was finished in the mid-1960s, the "Temporary A1A" and "Alternate A1A" signs were removed, the Jensen Beach Causeway became SR 732, and the mainland part of Alternate SR A1A was absorbed by SR 707 (at the same time, SR A1A absorbed a 1.5-mile-long SR 705 that extended southward from the eastern end of SR 732 as the famed highway was extended along the shoreline to Stuart).

In the late 1990s and early 2000s, some commercially prepared road maps incorrectly showed SR 732 extending westward on the mainland to an intersection with Federal Highway (US 1/SR 5) in West Jensen. The purported "mainland stretch" of SR 732, along Commercial Street (which was later renamed Jensen Beach Boulevard), was formerly SR 707A, which was transitioned from state to county control and maintenance in the mid-to-late 1990s. The confusion arises from the redesignation of the former SR 707A as County Road 732.

The original causeway consisted of a one-mile-long (1.6 km) wooden bridge with a hand-operated draw span, opened in 1924. Between 1955 and 1965, the wooden bridge was replaced gradually with a new concrete, electrically operated drawbridge named for Frank A. Wacha Sr. who helped raise funds for the new bridge. In 2004, the 1960s drawbridge was planned to be replaced with a new high-level fixed crossing. The drawbridge's replacement was intended to save on the high operating costs of the drawbridge, but prior to the new bridge's opening in March 2005, Hurricane Jeanne damaged the span and eroded away a 20-foot (6.1 m) section of the causeway road.

== Major intersections ==
The entire route is in Jensen Beach, Martin County.

mi	km	Destinations	Notes
0.000	0.000	US 1 (SR 5) / NE Treasure Coast Drive	
2.213	3.561	CR 707A east (Jensen Beach Boulevard) / CR 723 south (Savannah Road)	
Gap in route
0.000	0.000	CR 707 (NE Indian River Drive) / NE Pineapple Avenue	Roundabout
0.339– 0.814	0.546– 1.310	Frank A. Wacha Bridge over Indian River (Atlantic Intracoastal Waterway)	
1.898	3.055	SR A1A (Ocean Boulevard)	Roundabout
1.000 mi = 1.609 km; 1.000 km = 0.621 mi
