= Lake Park, Florida =

Town in the state of Florida, United States

- Town
- Town of Lake Park
- Seal

- Location of Lake Park in Palm Beach County, Florida
- Coordinates: 26°47′59″N 80°04′05″W
- Country: United States
- State: Florida
- County: Palm Beach
- Incorporated (Town of Kelsey City): 1923
- Incorporated (Town of Lake Park): 1939

Government
  - Type: Commission-Manager

Area
  - Total: 2.44 sq mi (6.31 km^{2})
  - Land: 2.08 sq mi (5.40 km^{2})
  - Water: 0.35 sq mi (0.91 km^{2})
- Elevation: 13 ft (4.0 m)

Population (2020)
  - Total: 9,047
  - Density: 4,339.3/sq mi (1,675.43/km^{2})
- Time zone: UTC-5 (Eastern (EST))
  - Summer (DST): UTC-4 (EDT)
- ZIP codes: 33403, 33408, 33410
- Area codes: 561, 728
- FIPS code: 12-38600
- GNIS feature ID: 2405974
- Website: www.lakeparkflorida.gov

Lake Park is a town in Palm Beach County, Florida, United States. Lake Park is part of South Florida. The population was 9,047 at the 2020 US census.

== Geography ==
According to the United States Census Bureau, the town has a total area of 2.3 square miles (595.70 ha), of which 2.2 square miles (5.7 km^{2}) is land and 0.2 square miles (0.52 km^{2}) (7.66%) is water. The eastern side borders the Intracoastal with views of Singer Island. Lake Park includes historic Kelsey Park and its own architecturally unique City Hall in the central area of Park Avenue.

== History ==
In 1923, it was officially incorporated as The Town of Kelsey City. It was originally named after Boston entrepreneur Harry Seymour Kelsey, after he purchased 30,000 acres (120 km^{2}) north of West Palm Beach. The town was renamed The Town of Lake Park in 1939, and it was the first zoned municipality in the State of Florida. It was designed and planned by Dr. John Nolan of Boston, Massachusetts, and the Olmsted Brothers, the landscaping firm of Frederick Law Olmsted's sons, Frederick Jr. and John Charles.

Since then, the boundaries of Lake Park have expanded to 2.35 square miles (6.1 km^{2}) of residential, business, industrial and mixed-use land. The Lake Park Town Hall, constructed in 1927 and listed on the National Register of Historic Places, survived the 1928 Okeechobee hurricane and served as a shelter for town residents during the storm.

== Demographics ==
Historical population
Census	Pop.	Note	%±
1930	470		—
1940	379		−19.4%
1950	489		29.0%
1960	3,589		633.9%
1970	6,993		94.8%
1980	6,909		−1.2%
1990	6,704		−3.0%
2000	8,721		30.1%
2010	8,155		−6.5%
2020	9,047		10.9%
U.S. Decennial Census

=== Racial and ethnic composition ===
Lake Park town, Florida – Racial and ethnic composition Note: the US Census treats Hispanic/Latino as an ethnic category. This table excludes Latinos from the racial categories and assigns them to a separate category. Hispanics/Latinos may be of any race.
Race / Ethnicity (NH = Non-Hispanic)	Pop 2000	Pop 2010	Pop 2020	% 2000	% 2010	% 2020
White alone (NH)	3,310	2,710	2,702	37.95%	33.23%	29.87%
Black or African American alone (NH)	4,174	4,378	4,843	47.86%	53.68%	53.53%
Native American or Alaska Native alone (NH)	16	11	5	0.18%	0.13%	0.06%
Asian alone (NH)	249	197	220	2.86%	2.42%	2.43%
Native Hawaiian or Pacific Islander alone (NH)	0	6	0	0.00%	0.07%	0.00%
Other race alone (NH)	18	17	57	0.21%	0.21%	0.63%
Mixed race or Multiracial (NH)	448	183	282	5.14%	2.24%	3.12%
Hispanic or Latino (any race)	506	653	938	5.80%	8.01%	10.37%
Total	8,721	8,155	9,047	100.00%	100.00%	100.00%

=== 2020 census ===
As of the 2020 census, Lake Park had a population of 9,047. The median age was 37.7 years. 22.7% of residents were under the age of 18 and 14.2% of residents were 65 years of age or older. For every 100 females there were 94.7 males, and for every 100 females age 18 and over there were 92.9 males age 18 and over.

100.0% of residents lived in urban areas, while 0.0% lived in rural areas.

There were 3,456 households in Lake Park, of which 31.6% had children under the age of 18 living in them. Of all households, 34.1% were married-couple households, 23.8% were households with a male householder and no spouse or partner present, and 33.8% were households with a female householder and no spouse or partner present. About 30.9% of all households were made up of individuals and 9.7% had someone living alone who was 65 years of age or older.

There were 3,755 housing units, of which 8.0% were vacant. The homeowner vacancy rate was 1.8% and the rental vacancy rate was 5.6%.

In 2020, there were an estimated 1,759 families residing in the town.

=== 2010 census ===
Lake Park Demographics
2010 Census	Lake Park	Palm Beach County	Florida
Total population	8,155	1,320,134	18,801,310
Population, percent change, 2000 to 2010	−6.5%	+16.7%	+17.6%
Population density	3,740.8/sq mi	670.2/sq mi	350.6/sq mi
White or Caucasian (including White Hispanic)	37.4%	73.5%	75.0%
(Non-Hispanic White or Caucasian)	33.2%	60.1%	57.9%
Black or African-American	53.7%	17.3%	16.0%
Hispanic or Latino (of any race)	8.0%	19.0%	22.5%
Asian	2.4%	2.4%	2.4%
Native American or Native Alaskan	0.1%	0.5%	0.4%
Pacific Islander or Native Hawaiian	0.1%	0.1%	0.1%
Two or more races (Multiracial)	2.2%	2.3%	2.5%
Some Other Race	0.2%	3.9%	3.6%

As of the 2010 United States census, there were 8,155 people, 2,751 households, and 1,785 families residing in the town.

=== 2000 census ===
As of the census of 2000, there were 8,721 people, 3,346 households, and 2,024 families residing in the town. The population density was 4,018.8 inhabitants per square mile (1,551.7/km^{2}). There were 3,650 housing units at an average density of 1,682.0 per square mile (649.4/km^{2}). The racial makeup of the town was 41.26% White (38% were Non-Hispanic White), 48.80% African American, 0.34% Native American, 2.89% Asian, 1.27% from other races, and 5.44% from two or more races. Hispanic or Latino of any race were 5.80% of the population.

As of 2000, there were 3,346 households, out of which 31.0% had children under the age of 18 living with them, 37.1% were married couples living together, 16.7% had a female householder with no husband present, and 39.5% were non-families. 29.3% of all households were made up of individuals, and 9.0% had someone living alone who was 65 years of age or older. The average household size was 2.58 and the average family size was 3.28.

In 2000, in the town, the population was spread out, with 26.6% under the age of 18, 9.4% from 18 to 24, 32.8% from 25 to 44, 18.5% from 45 to 64, and 12.8% who were 65 years of age or older. The median age was 34 years. For every 100 females, there were 96.3 males. For every 100 females age 18 and over, there were 95.1 males.

In 2000, the median income for a household in the town was $33,983, and the median income for a family was $37,047. Males had a median income of $26,476 versus $23,518 for females. The per capita income for the town was $18,212. About 12.5% of families and 16.8% of the population were below the poverty line, including 28.8% of those under age 18 and 12.3% of those age 65 or over.

As of 2000, speakers of English as a first language accounted for 76.01% of all residents, while French Creole made up 13.11%, Spanish was at 5.83%, French consisted of 2.35%, Vietnamese made up 1.34%, and Chinese as a mother tongue made up 0.59% of the population.

As of 2000, Lake Park had the sixth highest percentage of Haitian residents in the US, with 14.50% of the populace. It also had the 19th highest percentage of Jamaican residents in the US, at 5.80% of the town's population (tied with the Carol City section of Miami Gardens.)

== Libraries ==
The Lake Park Library is a public library at 529 Park Avenue, Lake Park, FL 33403. It was founded by the Lake Park Woman's Club in 1962, and it was established on the Town Hall's second floor. Ownership of the library was transferred from the Woman's Club to the town, and it was relocated in 1969 to a new building next door, where it currently resides. The growing population and book collection led to the creation of a meeting room and a separate children's room by 1990. Thereafter, rapid transformations in the library's services and the diversification of library materials led to expanding the building from December 1999 to October 2000.

The library provides a variety of services and events including storytimes for children, homework assistance, programs for adults, public computers with internet access, and access to two study rooms.
