= List of former place names in Brevard County, Florida =

These are the names of places currently or previously used by the Geographic Names Information System in Brevard County, Florida. Some are early developments, some are early post offices stations such as Artesia, and others are former stations along the main line of the Florida East Coast Railway. Several of these were absorbed into Kennedy Space Center when it was created. See the main article in Brevard County for place names which are still used.

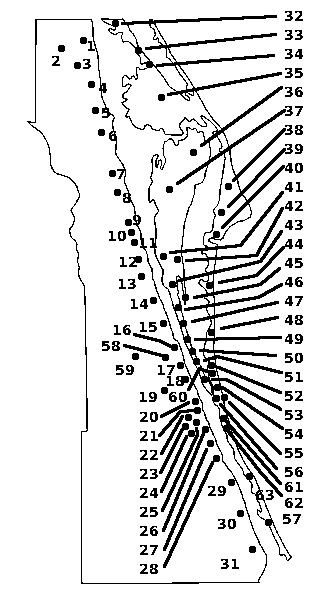
Current and Historic Places of Brevard County. The numbering on this image does not correspond to the list in this article; the article detailing this image has its own listing (q.v.)

- Allenhurst
- Angel City - Newfound Harbor section of Merritt Island, south of SR 520
- Artesia
- Atlantic
- Audubon
- Aurantia
- Aurora - Turtlemound Rd and Aurora Rd (County)
- Averill
- Bahia
- Ballard Pines
- Banyan (Post Office)
- Bellwood
- Brantley
- Bonaventure - south of Rockledge on U.S. 1
- Bovine - Post Road and Turtlemound Rd. (County)
- Bugsbee - north of Suntree Blvd and U.S. 1, south of Bonaventure
- Canova Beach - Eau Gallie Blvd at SR A1A (Indian Harbour Beach). Named after Irene H. Canova, a longtime resident.
- City Point - About one mile north of 528 on the mainland side of the Indian River. Formerly a ferrying point to Merritt Island.
- Clifton
- Coquina (Post Office)
- Courtenay - Merritt Island
- Delespine - Location of the historic Delespine land Grant given to Joseph Delespine during the Spanish administration, argued before the US Supreme Court
- Dummitt Grove (formerly Dummitt's Grove)
- Eau Gallie
- Evans Pines
- Faustina
- Frontenac
- Georgiana - Merritt Island - South Tropical Trail (CR 3) - former ferry landing to Cocoa
- Goshen - Melbourne - North of Lake Washington Rd and Pineapple Rd
- Grant (Incorporated into the town of Grant-Valkaria)
- Happy Go Lucky (Now launch complex at Cape Canaveral near pad 39A)
- Hardeeville
- Hartland (Post Office)
- Heath
- Hopkins - East end of Union Cypress Railroad
- Horti
- Indianola - Merritt Island - North Tropical Trail
- Indian River City - Titusville
- Jay Jay
- La Grange
- Lotus - Merritt Island - South Tropical Trail (CR 3)
- Melbourne Shores
- Merritt City
- Mintons Corner - West Melbourne - US 192 and Wickham Rd/Minton Rd
- Mortonhurst (Post Office)
- Nathans
- Oceanus
- Orsino
- Pineda - U.S. 1 at Suntree Blvd (County)
- Pritchards
- Rockwell - Merritt Island - South Tropical Trail (CR 3)
- Sarno
- Sharpes - County Jail
- Sherman Park - South of Palm Shores, Florida on U.S. 1
- Shiloh
- Spyglass
- Suntree - Wickham Rd at Suntree Blvd (County)
- Tillman (Post Office)
- Tropic - South Tropical Trail, Merritt Island
- Turnbull
- Turtle Mound - Northern end of Turtle Mound Rd
- Valkaria (Incorporated into the town of Grant-Valkaria)
- Wiley
- Williams Point
- Wilson

== See also ==
- Geographical renaming
