= Florida State Road 513 =

State highway in Florida, United States

State Road 513
- South Patrick Drive
- SR 513 highlighted in red

Route information
- Maintained by FDOT
- Length: 5.253 mi (8.454 km)

Major junctions
- South end: SR 518 in Melbourne
- North end: SR 404 at Patrick Space Force Base

Location
- Country: United States
- State: Florida

Highway system
- Florida State Highway System; Interstate; US; State; Former; Pre‑1945; Toll; Scenic
← SR 512	→ SR 514

State Road 513 (SR 513), also known as South Patrick Drive, is a short north–south road located along the western side of the barrier island towns of Indian Harbour Beach, Satellite Beach and South Patrick Shores in Brevard County. The southern terminus is at an intersection with SR 518 near the eastern end of the Eau Gallie Causeway in Indian Harbour Beach. The northern terminus is at a partial interchange with the Pineda Causeway (SR 404), just south of the southern entrance of Patrick Space Force Base.

== Route description ==
The road starts at the intersection of the Eau Gallie Causeway (SR 518) and Riverside Drive/South Patrick Drive, with SR 518 starting north on South Patrick Drive, through a mix of commercial and residential areas, staying within a few blocks of the Banana River. The road enters Satellite Beach, and intersects CR 3 (Banana River Drive). North of the intersection, SR 513 becomes more residential, with the occasional commercial development, and continues through the beach community. The road ends at SR 404, the Pineda Causeway, a former toll road with access to U.S. Route 1 (SR 5) on the mainland in South Patrick Shores. North of SR 404, the road approaches the main entrance of Patrick Space Force Base.

The road continues south of SR 513's southern terminus as Riverside Drive, crossing US 192 in Indialantic, and ending at Ocean Avenue in Melbourne Beach, two blocks west of SR A1A.

== Major intersections ==
The entire route is in Brevard County.

Location	mi	km	Destinations	Notes
Melbourne–Indian Harbour line	0.000	0.000	SR 518 (Eau Gallie Boulevard)	
Indian Harbour Beach	0.890	1.432	Banana River Drive (CR 3 north)	
South Patrick Shores	5.20	8.37	SR 404 west to US 1	interchange
	5.253	8.454	Patrick Space Force Base	
1.000 mi = 1.609 km; 1.000 km = 0.621 mi: Incomplete access
