= Florida State Road 404 =

Highway in Florida

State Road 404
- Pineda Causeway
- SR 404 highlighted in red

Route information
- Maintained by FDOT
- Length: 4.139 mi (6.661 km)
- Existed: 1973–present

Major junctions
- West end: US 1 near Palm Shores
- East end: SR A1A in South Patrick Shores

Location
- Country: United States
- State: Florida

Highway system
- Florida State Highway System; Interstate; US; State; Former; Pre‑1945; Toll; Scenic
← SR 401	→ SR 405

State Road 404 (SR 404), the Pineda Causeway, is an east–west divided highway currently running from Interstate 95 (I-95) to SR A1A at Patrick Space Force Base, Florida, US. It was opened as a toll road in 1971 and classified as a state road two years later. The tolls were removed in 1990. It was named after Pineda, a former village east of Suntree on U.S. Route 1 (US 1). With interchanges at US 1 (SR 5), South Tropical Trail (County Road 3, CR 3), and South Patrick Drive (SR 513), the Pineda Causeway is (along with SR A1A) the primary access for Patrick Space Force Base and the southern end of Merritt Island. From US 1 to the eastern terminus, it is part of the Indian River Lagoon Scenic Highway system.

== Route description ==
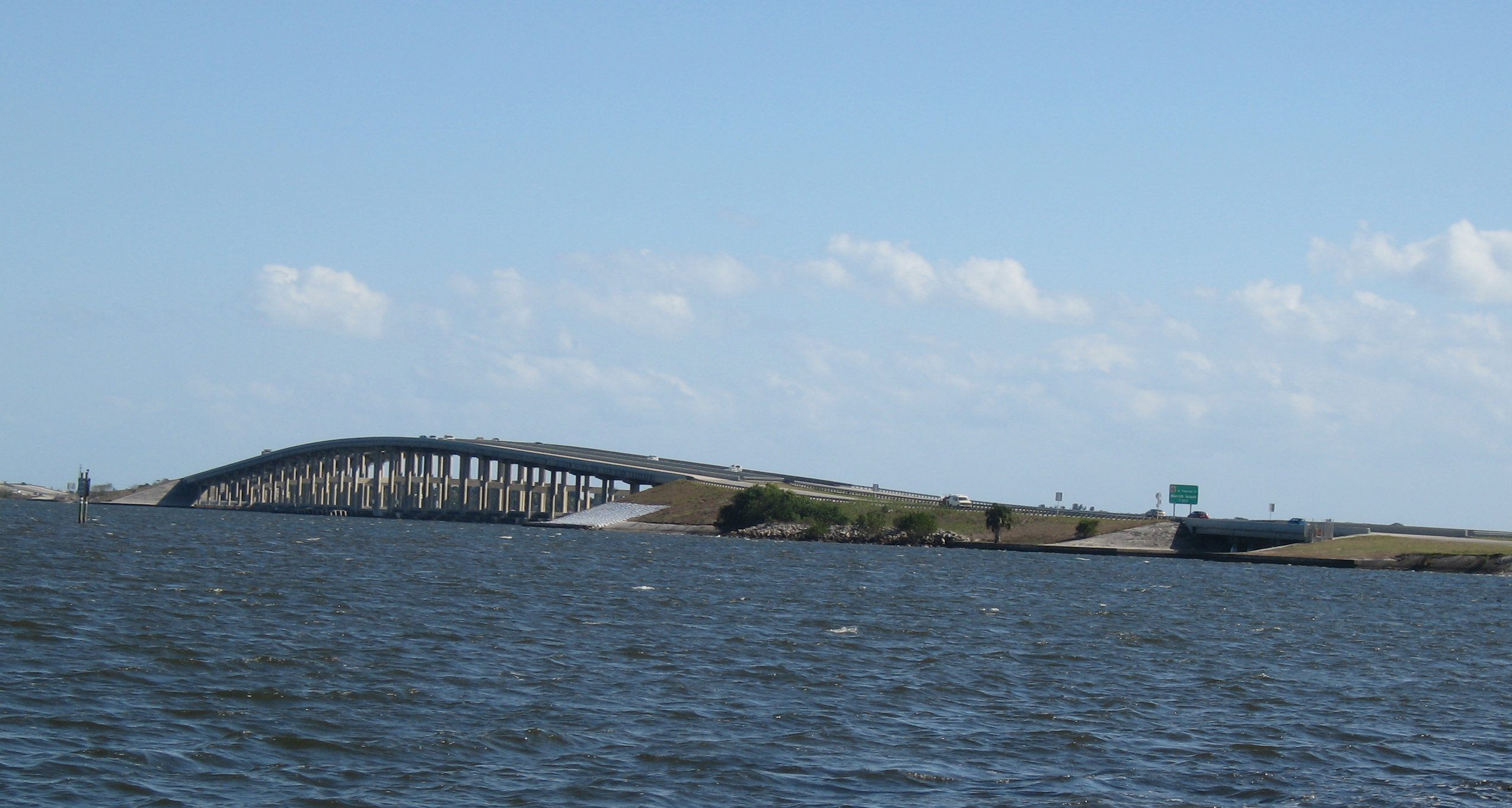
Pineda Causeway from US 1

The Pineda Causeway Extension begins at an interchange with Interstate 95 at exit 188. From I-95, the Pineda Causeway Extension passes between developments to its north and south. After an intersection with a local road, the route curves to the northeast and later resumes its eastward course, reaching Wickham Road. The route turns to the east and moves across the Florida East Coast Railway, via a partially completed overpass.

East of the railway, the route crosses below US 1. The eastbound lane has an exit ramp that connects to both directions of US 1; in contrast, the westbound lane has a dedicated exit for both US 1 northbound and a loop to US 1 southbound. The road continues to the east, crossing a small inlet and a small island before ascending over the Indian River with twin bridges. At the eastern end of the bridges, the route again crosses a small island and inlet before reaching a narrow portion of Merritt Island. There, the causeway intersects with CR 3. The route crosses a series of islands, forming another twin set of bridges over the Banana River. After reaching land for the final time, the route enters South Patrick Shores and passes to the south of Patrick Space Force Base. It has a partial interchange with SR 513, with only an eastbound exit and a westbound entrance. After passing north of a housing development, the causeway ends at an intersection with SR A1A.

Along the causeway east of the extension, the Florida Department of Transportation (FDOT) estimated in 2011 that 37,500 cars drove on the route each day. According to the Space Coast Transportation Planning Organization, 30,245 cars drove on the route between U.S. 1 and I-95.

As part of a pilot project, FDOT has painted the shoulders as bike lanes, thus allowing cyclists on a controlled-access highway that had been closed to them.

== History ==
Due to high traffic involving the Kennedy Space Center and Patrick Space Force Base in eastern Brevard County, local politicians in the early 1960s petitioned the United States Bureau of Public Roads for federal funding in creating a new causeway across the Banana River, between the Eau Gallie Causeway and SR 520. Although the federal agency declined twice due to low traffic projections, local officials maintained the need for the proposed causeway. In November 1969, after FDOT opened bids for various state construction projects, the Gregg, Gibson & Gregg Inc. put out a $7.7 million estimate to build the causeway from US 1 to the eastern shore of the Banana River. Ultimately, the original Pineda Causeway was opened in 1972, costing about $7 million to construct. In the previous year, the route's interchanges with US 1 and CR 3, as well as the bridges, were completed. In 1972, the interchange with SR 513 was finished. On May 31, 1973, FDOT classified the bridge and causeway as State Route 404.

Initially it was a toll road, which funded the road's maintenance. However, FDOT agreed in 1989 to remove the fee and pay for maintenance. In June 1990, workers removed the toll along the Pineda Causeway, along with the Bennett Causeway to the north, at a cost of $745,000. The interchange with U.S. 1, which was first built in 1971, was reconstructed in 1997. In 1999, the route became part of the newly created Indian River Lagoon Scenic Highway, which was a series of roads around the Indian River Lagoon.

In conjunction with a project to add additional lanes to I-95, FDOT authorized funding in March 2008 to create an interchange with an extension of the Pineda Causeway. The two projects were estimated to cost $202 million upon completion. On May 2, 2011, the interchange with I-95 opened. FDOT also authorized $10 million to complete the extension from the interchange to its original routing. The overall cost of the extension was estimated at $27 million, of which the remainder not financed by FDOT was paid by impact fee and gas tax. Groundbreaking for the extension occurred on December 14, 2007, and the project was finished in May 2011. This created a 1.9 mi (3.1 km) extension of the highway after decades of planning; once finished, it became a hurricane evacuation route. The project was expected to aid the local economy due to ease of travel from I-95 to the beach.

In 2008, Brevard County commissioned a $400,000 study to create an overpass for the causeway over the Florida East Coast Railway line, located just west of US 1. In July 2018, FDOT began a $24 million construction project to build a bridge over the Florida East Coast Railway, at a height of 25 ft (7.6 m), as well as to add a traffic signal for Holy Trinity Episcopal Academy. The eastbound bridge was finished on March 19, 2020. The overpass was named for Major General John Cleland, a local World War II veteran.

The extension dead-ended just west of the I-95 interchange until May 5, 2021 when it was connected to Pineda Boulevard, which connects to Lake Andrew Drive. Eventually, Pineda Boulevard will connect to Stadium Parkway and Wickham Road.

== Exit list ==
The entire route is in Brevard County.

Location	mi	km	Destinations	Notes
	−2.8	−4.5	I-95 (SR 9)	Exit 188 (I-95); western terminus of Pineda Causeway
Melbourne	−0.5	−0.80	Wickham Road (CR 509)	At-grade intersection; western terminus of signed SR 404
Melbourne–Palm Shores line	0.000	0.000	West end of state maintenance; West end of freeway portion	
Melbourne–Palm Shores line	0.000	0.000	Pineda Plaza Way / North Wickham Road (CR 509)	Westbound exit ramp only; signed as Pineda Plaza Way to Wickham Road
Palm Shores	0.19	0.31	US 1 (SR 5) – Cocoa, Melbourne	Partial cloverleaf interchange
	0.688– 1.120	1.107– 1.802	Pineda Causeway over Indian River (Atlantic Intracoastal Waterway)	
Merritt Island	1.64	2.64	CR 3 (South Tropical Trail) – Merritt Island	Diamond interchange
	2.182– 2.372	3.512– 3.817	Pineda Causeway over Banana River	
South Patrick Shores	3.61	5.81	SR 513 – Patrick Space Force Base	Eastbound exit and westbound entrance
South Patrick Shores	4.139	6.661	SR A1A – Patrick Space Force Base, Satellite Beach	At-grade intersection; eastern terminus
1.000 mi = 1.609 km; 1.000 km = 0.621 mi: Incomplete access
