= Melbourne Causeway =

Bridge in Florida, United States of America

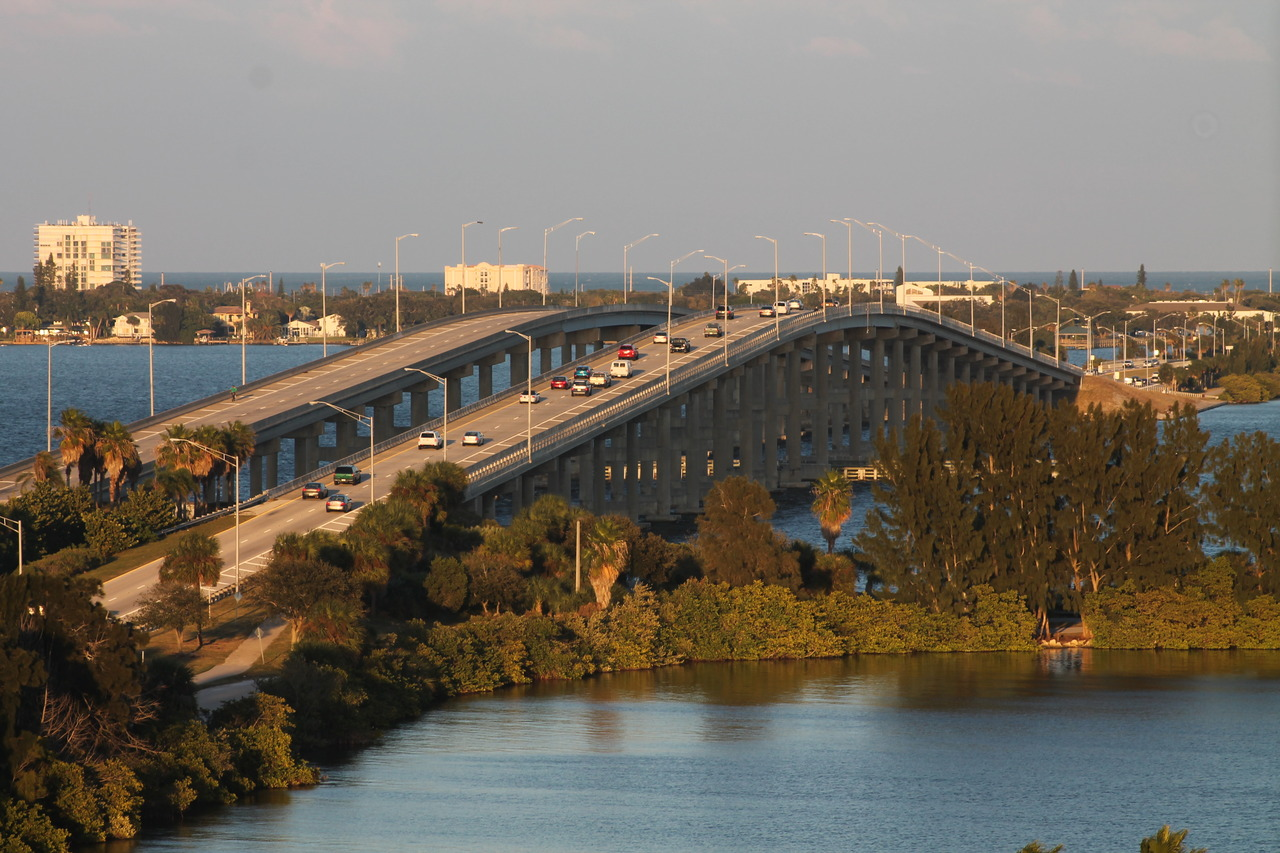
- Melbourne Causeway in 2013
- Coordinates: 28.0840°N 80.5915°W
- Carries: 2 general purpose lanes of US 192 (each bridge)
- Crosses: Indian River Lagoon
- Locale: between Melbourne, Florida and Indialantic, Florida
- Official name: Ernest Kouwen-Hoven Bridge
- Maintained by: Florida Department of Transportation
- ID number: 700174 - Westbound; 700181 - Eastbound

Characteristics
- Design: reinforced concrete
- Total length: 2.0 km (1.2 mi) (bridge lengths combined)
- Width: unknown
- Longest span: 790.0 meters (2,590 feet; 0.491 miles)
- Clearance above: 16.76 meters (55.0 feet)
- Clearance below: 15.25 meters (50.0 feet)

History
- Opened: 1979 - Westbound, 1984 - Eastbound

Location
- Interactive map of Melbourne Causeway

Melbourne Causeway
- Coordinates: 28.0872°N 80.5825°W
- Carries: 2 general purpose lanes (each bridge)
- Crosses: Indian River Lagoon
- Locale: between Melbourne, Florida and Indialantic, Florida
- Official name: Central Relief
- Maintained by: Florida Department of Transportation
- ID number: 700173 - Westbound; 700175 - Eastbound

Characteristics
- Design: reinforced concrete
- Total length: 62.8 meters (206 feet)
- Width: unknown
- Longest span: 62.8 meters (206 feet)
- Clearance above: 6.1 meters (20 feet)
- Clearance below: 4.6 meters (15 feet)

History
- Opened: 1979

Location
- Interactive map of Melbourne Causeway

Melbourne Causeway
- Coordinates: 28.0887°N 80.5770°W
- Carries: 4 general purpose lanes
- Crosses: Indian River Lagoon
- Locale: between Melbourne, Florida and Indialantic, Florida
- Official name: Eastern Relief
- Maintained by: Florida Department of Transportation
- ID number: 700037

Characteristics
- Design: reinforced concrete
- Total length: 66 meters (217 feet)
- Width: unknown
- Longest span: 66 meters (217 feet)
- Clearance above: 6.1 meters (20 feet)
- Clearance below: 4.6 meters (15 feet)

History
- Opened: 1947

Location
- Interactive map of Melbourne Causeway

The Melbourne Causeway is located entirely within Brevard County, Florida in the United States. It is composed of three bridges and connects the municipalities of Melbourne and Indialantic across the Indian River Lagoon in Brevard County. The causeway is part of U.S. 192 (also known as SR 500), whose eastern terminus is located approximately 2 miles (3.2 km) east of the bridge, at SR A1A. East of the bridge, the road is known locally as Fifth Avenue. On the western side, the road continues through downtown Melbourne as Strawbridge Avenue. Each July 4, the bridge is closed for a fireworks show.

There are two bridges in Melbourne, the Melbourne Causeway and the Eau Gallie Causeway (SR 518) With the latter being named for the old city of Eau Gallie, which merged with Melbourne in 1969.

== History ==
=== First bridge ===
Ernest Kouwen-Hoven began construction of the second bridge across the Indian River in 1919. The first bridge was completed 2 years earlier near Cocoa, Florida. By May 1921 the bridge was complete and unofficially opened as a toll bridge. It was 9,706 feet (2,958 meters) or nearly 2 miles (3.2 km) long (3 kilometers). Approximately 1/3 of the way from Melbourne there was a 134-foot-long (41 m) hand-operated draw. On September 18, 1921, the bridge officially opened. A Mr. J. E. Campbell was the first to drive across the bridge. During construction three sawmills were built by Ernest Kouwen-Hoven. They did not all exist at the same time. The first one was in Melbourne Village, the second was on the Nevin Property on Merritt Island, and the third was 5 miles (8.0 km) west of Grant.

=== Second bridge ===
The causeway between Indialantic and Melbourne was opened to traffic on August 1, 1939. The causeway consisted of fill material dredged from the bottom of the Indian River south of the causeway's location. The road surface was asphalt laid down and pressed by road rolling machines. The wooden bridge was largely replaced by the new causeway. The original bridge had a rotating span near the western end of the causeway to permit boat traffic to pass through and was operated by a person in a small shelter directly on the rotating section. In the following paragraph it appears that the author is referring to the replacement of the rotating draw span.

In 1941, construction began on the second bridge between Melbourne and Indialantic. This bridge was a low-rise swing draw bridge. On August 1, 1947, Mrs. Ernest Kouwen-Hoven cut the ribbon and the same J. E. Campbell that crossed the first bridge, was the first to cross this bridge.

=== Third bridge ===
The third bridge contains two twin spans that are 2,592.5 feet (790.2 m) long. According to the Melbourne Centennial Book the official start of construction was February 2, 1976, and the bridge was expected to be complete by fall of 1977. It appears to have been delayed with the westbound span being constructed in 1977 and ending 2 years later. From bridge id numbers, it appears that the western relief bridges were also constructed during this time. Construction of the eastbound span did not begin until 1981 and finished in 1984.

== Component bridges ==
=== Ernest Kouwen-Hoven Memorial Bridge ===
The Ernest Kouwen-Hoven Memorial Bridge is the official name of the high-rise span, officially dedicated by the State of Florida Legislature on 28 May 1978. This name is not used locally, and only appears in official government documents.

=== Relief bridges ===
These bridges are unremarkable, and have no appreciable change in grade. The easternmost relief bridge is commonly used by local fishermen.

== Sources ==
=== Bridge ID's ===
- Town of Indialantic Meeting Minutes September 14, 2005
- Town of Indialantic Meeting Minutes April 19, 2005
- Contract Bidding Information for main-span work

=== Bridge length ===
- Florida Geographical Data Library
  - Search under Transportation Networks, "Bridges" retrieve "RCI Bridges". Data retrieved by using modified shp2text program.

=== Original bridge length ===
- Trip to Florida by Scott M. Kozel

=== Bridge history ===
- Melbourne Beach Historical Trail
- Town of Indialantic History Page
- Brevard County Historical Commission - Indian River Journal Quarterly - Fall 2002
- Melbourne Centennial Book. Melbourne Chamber of Commerce. 1980

== Kiwanis Park at Geiger Point ==
At the base of the causeway on the western side is the Kiwanis Park at Geiger Point, a 7-acre community park managed by the Brevard County Parks & Recreation.
