= Angel City, Florida =

Angel City
- Populated place
- Location in the United States
- Coordinates: 28°20′40″N 80°39′38″W
- Country: United States
- State: Florida
- County: Brevard
- Post Office founded: 1927
- Elevation: 0 ft (0 m)
- ZIP code: 32952
- Area code: 321

Angel City is a populated place on the Horti Point peninsula of Merritt Island, in Brevard County, Florida, United States. Angel City had a post office between 1927 and 1931. It is believed that the community was named for an early settler, John Angel. Hattie Worley, wife of Oscar Worley, the bridge tender, named Angel City after the first homesteader, Captain Angel from Rhode Island.

== Merritt Island Causeway Bridge ==
Plaque showing location where Merritt Island Causeway left Angel City to connect with Cocoa Beach.

The Merritt Island Causeway linked Cocoa Beach to Angel City via a wooden toll bridge from 1922 to 1941. A plaque that marks this location states, "On this site on April 19, 1923, a wooden drawbridge across the Banana River was opened to the public linking Merritt Island to Cocoa Beach. To pay for the bridge, there was a round trip toll of .20 for car and driver plus .04 charge for each additional passenger. Upon completion of State Road 520 in 1941, the old bridge was dismantled. Only the concrete abutment and a few pilings remain to mark the location of the bridge that opened Cocoa Beach to development."

Oscar Worley was the toll bridge tender until the present SR 520 was opened on June 5, 1941. Oscar Worley was denied the opportunity to tend the new bridge, and instead ran a fish business in Angel City until his death in 1956 at age of 83. The Worleys were the second family to homestead in Angel City. The road Worley Avenue is named after them. The Worley family still resides in Angel City. Oscar Worley had a Grand Son, Donald Worley whom was born on the Bridge and his birth certificate reads: place of Birth reader Banana River toll bridge.

== Geography ==
Angel City is bounded to the south and east by the Banana River, to the west by Newfound Harbor, and to the north is SR 520. Buck Point is the southernmost point of the peninsula where Newfound Harbor ends at Banana River.

There are two uninhabited islands south of Buck Point named Brady and George's islands, which are accessible from Lotus and Georgiana. These islands are spoil islands. The southern of the two islands, commonly referred to as Bird Island, is popular with locals for boating, camping, and other such recreation. The island has earned this name, not by the overwhelming number of birds that populate it, but by its shape. From the air, the island resembles a pelican in mid-flight. The islands are a popular place for manatee and dolphin sightings. The islands are also home to pelican, great blue heron, seagull, southern stingray and rat snakes. White pelicans can be seen here in late winter, during their migratory journey. The Intracoastal Waterway passes by the islands to the north and east. To the west is Lotus, a part of Merritt Island more commonly known as Honeymoon Hill. To the south, Pineda Causeway can be seen. To the east is Patrick Space Force Base.
