= Tropic, Florida =

Tropic (also known as “The Trops”) is an unincorporated area in Brevard County, Florida, United States. It is the southernmost area on Merritt Island, and its identity was absorbed into the census-designated place of Merritt Island during the Space Age of the 1950s and 1960s. This portion of Merritt Island is served by County Road 3 (South Tropical Trail) and the Mather's Bridge.

== Geography ==
Tropic was located at 28°08′55″N 80°36′25″W.

=== Surrounding areas ===
- Lotus
- Indian River
- Indian Harbor Beach; Satellite Beach; South Patrick Shores;Banana River
- Indian River; Palm Shores; Sherman Park; Melbourne
