= Indialantic, Florida =

Town in the state of Florida, United States

- Town
- Town of Indialantic
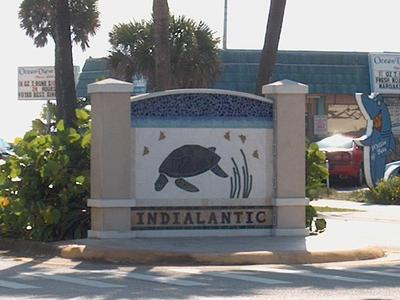
- Indialantic sign

- Seal

- Location in Brevard County and the state of Florida
- Coordinates: 28°05′14″N 80°34′04″W
- Country: United States
- State: Florida
- County: Brevard
- Settled (East Melbourne): c. 1892
- Platted (Indialantic-By-The-Sea): c. 1915–1917
- Incorporated (Town of Indialantic): November 17, 1952

Government
  - Type: Council-Manager
  - Mayor: Mark McDermott
  - Deputy Mayor: Doug Wright
  - Council Members: John Brady, Carrie Foy, and Julie McKnight
  - Town Manager: Michael Casey
  - Town Clerk: Mollie Carr

Area
  - Total: 1.31 sq mi (3.39 km^{2})
  - Land: 0.97 sq mi (2.52 km^{2})
  - Water: 0.34 sq mi (0.88 km^{2})
- Elevation: 13 ft (4.0 m)

Population (2020)
  - Total: 3,010
  - Density: 3,097.0/sq mi (1,195.76/km^{2})
- Time zone: UTC-5 (Eastern (EST))
  - Summer (DST): UTC-4 (EDT)
- ZIP code: 32903
- Area code: 321
- FIPS code: 12-33375
- GNIS feature ID: 2405883
- Website: www.indialantic.com

Indialantic, is a town in Brevard County, Florida, United States. It is part of the Palm Bay–Melbourne–Titusville, Florida Metropolitan Statistical Area. The town's population was 3,010 at the 2020 United States census, up from 2,720 at the 2010 census.

The town's name is a portmanteau derived from the town's location between the Indian River Lagoon and the Atlantic Ocean.

== History ==
In 1892, a homesteader named J.H. Phillips decided to build a home on his pineapple plantation in Indialantic, which he called "East Melbourne".

From 1915 to 1917, Ernest Kouwenhoven, an immigrant from the Netherlands, bought the land that ultimately became Indialantic, settled in the area, named the community "Indialantic-By-The-Sea", and between 1919 to 1921, built a wooden bridge connecting Indialantic with Melbourne, the first bridge connecting Indialantic with Melbourne.

In the 1920s, the Indialantic Hotel was built. Its name was later changed to the Tradewinds Hotel. The hotel was on what is now South Shannon Avenue, the current location of Tradewinds Terrace.

By 1924, the Indialantic Casino was built. Its name was later changed to the Bahama Beach Club. This is the location of Nance Park today.

From 1941 to 1947, the original wooden bridge was replaced with a drawbridge, delayed by the war years.

The Town of Indialantic was officially incorporated as a municipality on November 17, 1952.

In 1975, the entire town was designated as a bird sanctuary.

In 1985, a third bridge consisting of a modern causeway with separate eastbound and westbound elevated spans was built, in order to avoid obstructing boats using the Indian River.

== Geography ==
Indialantic is situated on the barrier island that separates the Indian River Lagoon from the Atlantic Ocean. This island, approximately 40 miles (64 km) in length, stretches south from Cape Canaveral to the Sebastian Inlet. The Melbourne Causeway connects Indialantic to the city of Melbourne across the Indian River Lagoon. Indialantic is bordered on the south by the town of Melbourne Beach and on the north by unincorporated Brevard County and Indian Harbor Beach, Florida.

According to the United States Census Bureau, the town has a total area of 1.3 square miles (3.4 km^{2}). 0.97 square miles (2.5 km^{2}) of it is land, and 0.35 square miles (0.9 km^{2}) of it (25.80%) is water.

=== Greater Indialantic ===
Greater Indialantic, outside the town boundaries, represents a parallel development of suburban beach homes, which for lack of a stronger identity, has assumed that of the nearest town. The Town of Indialantic is a 1 by 1 mile (1.6 by 1.6 km) community. The areas mentioned below are not in town but share a ZIP code with Indialantic.

This area starts with the town of Indialantic on the south and lies between the Atlantic Ocean and the Indian River, extending north just short of the Eau Gallie Causeway (SR 518). It includes mostly unincorporated parts of Brevard County but also includes a development that is part of the city of Melbourne, otherwise a mainland community.

Included are these developments:

- Canova Beach
- Cloisters
- Coventry
- Highland Groves
- Indialantic Heights
- North Atlantic by the Sea
- Ocean Park
- Oceanside Village
- Palm Colony
- Puesta del Sol
- Rio Linda
- Rio Villa
- River Shores
- Riviera
- The Sanctuary (part of the City of Melbourne)
- Shady Shores
- Terrace Shores

=== Climate ===
The Town of Indialantic is part of the humid subtropical climate zone with a Köppen Climate Classification of "Cfa" (C = mild temperate, f = fully humid, and a = hot summer).

== Demographics ==
Historical population
Census	Pop.	Note	%±
1960	1,653		—
1970	2,685		62.4%
1980	2,883		7.4%
1990	2,844		−1.4%
2000	2,944		3.5%
2010	2,720		−7.6%
2020	3,010		10.7%
U.S. Decennial Census

=== Racial and ethnic composition ===
Indialantic racial composition (Hispanics excluded from racial categories)
Race	Pop 2010	Pop 2020	% 2010	% 2020
White (Note: non-Hispanic)	2,475	2,638	90.99%	87.64%
Black or African American	7	15	0.26%	0.50%
Native American or Alaska Native	5	7	0.18%	0.23%
Asian	46	53	1.69%	1.76%
Pacific Islander or Native Hawaiian	0	0	0.00%	0.00%
Some other race	0	11	0.00%	0.37%
Two or more races/Multiracial	44	114	1.62%	3.79%
Hispanic or Latino (any race)	143	172	5.26%	5.71%
Total	2,720	3,010	100.00%	100.00%

=== 2020 census ===
As of the 2020 census, Indialantic had a population of 3,010. The median age was 52.2 years. 17.6% of residents were under the age of 18 and 24.7% of residents were 65 years of age or older. For every 100 females there were 99.1 males, and for every 100 females age 18 and over there were 96.1 males age 18 and over.

As of 2020, 100.0% of residents lived in urban areas, while 0.0% lived in rural areas.

In 2020, there were 1,368 households in Indialantic, of which 23.6% had children under the age of 18 living in them. Of all households, 53.9% were married-couple households, 18.3% were households with a male householder and no spouse or partner present, and 21.6% were households with a female householder and no spouse or partner present. About 28.6% of all households were made up of individuals and 13.2% had someone living alone who was 65 years of age or older.

In 2020, there were 1,586 housing units, of which 13.7% were vacant. The homeowner vacancy rate was 2.3% and the rental vacancy rate was 16.5%.

According to the 2020 American Community Survey, there were 757 families residing in the town.

In 2020, the top ancestries were 19.7% English, 14.3% German, 8.5% Italian, 7.1% Irish, 6.9% Scottish, 5.7% Polish, 3.8% French, and 1.2% Norwegian.

In 2020, 13.7% of the population were foreign born; of those, 44.7% were born in Europe, 34.5% were born in Asia, 14.4% were born in Latin America, and 6.4% were born in North America.

In 2020, the median household income was $76,773, with families having $139,625, and married couples having $145,132. A total of 13.3% of the population were in poverty, with 17.7% of people under 18, 13.2% of people between the ages of 18 and 64, and 10.5% of people 65 or older being in poverty.

=== 2010 census ===
As of the 2010 United States census, there were 2,720 people, 1,316 households, and 817 families residing in the town.

=== 2000 census ===
As of the census of 2000, there were 2,944 people, 1,330 households, and 848 families residing in the town. The population density was 2,840.6 inhabitants per square mile (1,096.8/km^{2}). There were 1,467 housing units at an average density of 1,415.5 units per square mile (546.5 units/km^{2}).

In 2000, there were 1,330 households, out of which 21.6% had children under the age of 18 living with them, 54.2% were married couples living together, 7.0% had a female householder with no husband present, and 36.2% were non-families. 27.3% of all households were made up of individuals, and 12.4% had someone living alone who was 65 years of age or older. The average household size was 2.21 and the average family size was 2.72.

In 2000, in the town, the population was spread out, with 17.6% under the age of 18, 4.7% from 18 to 24, 26.4% from 25 to 44, 27.3% from 45 to 64, and 24.0% who were 65 years of age or older. The median age was 46 years. For every 100 females, there were 97.5 males. For every 100 females age 18 and over, there were 97.4 males.

In 2000, the median income for a household in the town was $62,181, and the median income for a family was $76,109. Males had a median income of $51,830 versus $30,047 for females. The per capita income for the town was $41,126. About 1.1% of families and 2.3% of the population were below the poverty line, including none of those under age 18 and 1.9% of those age 65 or over.

In 2000, the per capita income of $41,126 places the town of Indialantic first in Brevard County and 58 in the state (out of 887 places).

==== Greater Indialantic ====
Here are the figures as of the 2000 census for the area with the Zip code 32903:

Total population = 12,792

Gender and age:

- Male = 6,339 (49.6%)
- Female = 6,453 (50.4%)
- Median Age = 45.2, above US average of 35.3
- Under 5 years = 583 (4.6%)
- 18 years and over = 10,361 (81%)
- 65 years and over = 2,887 (22.6%)

Racial characteristics:

- White – 96.4%
- Asian – 1.2%
- Two or more races – 1.1%
- Black or African American – 0.7%
- Another Race – 0.5%

Households:

- Size – 2.25
- Family size – 2.74

Housing:

- Owner occupied – 78.5%
- Renter occupied – 21.5%
- Vacant housing units – 11.3%

Social Characteristics:

- High school graduate or higher – 95.2%
- Bachelor's degree or higher – 47.5%
- Veterans – 21.5%
- Disability status (5 years and over) – 15%
- Foreign born – 7.4%
- Male, now married, except separated, (15 years and over) – 61.5%
- Female, now married, except separated, (15 years and over) – 61.1%
- Speak a language other than English at home (5 years and over) – 8.1%

== Government ==
The town publishes a quarterly report to all residents.

As of 2026, officers are as follows:

- Mayor – Mark McDermott
- Deputy Mayor – Doug Wright
- Council Member – John Brady
- Council Member – Carrie Foy
- Council Member – Julie McKnight

As of 2026, the following are all appointed or hired:

- Town Manager – Michael Casey
- Police Chief – Michael Connor
- Public Works Director – Joe Gervais
- Town Attorney – Matthew Ramenda
- Town Clerk – Mollie Carr
- Fire Chief – Keith Maddox
- Building Official – Clifford Stokes

In 2008, the town had a taxable real estate base of $367.69 million. The budget for fiscal year 2012 was $4,060,999.

=== Public safety ===
There are six paid firefighters plus fifteen active volunteers. Since 1985, residents have lit luminaria before Christmas when firemen have distributed candy to children from a firetruck, on every street.

Indialantic maintains a police force with 12 sworn police officers, including the chief of police. On average, officers respond to 4,000 calls for service a year with an approximate response time of under two minutes.

Emergency services are dispatched from the town's communications center, staffed by four full-time and five part-time dispatchers.

=== Past mayors ===
1. John McLean 1952–1954
2. Louis H. Mussler c. 1954–1958
3. William Ballinger 1958–1959
4. Harry Kane 1959–1961
5. Timothy D. Deratany 1971–1977
6. Clayton Test 1977–1979
7. Constantine "Gus" Carey 1979–1981
8. Andrea Deratany 1981–1984
9. Gloria Gardner 1984–1985
10. Barry Kronman 1985–1987
11. Norbert "Norb" O'Hara 1987–1989
12. David Lawrence Dean 1989–1992
13. Bill Vernon 1992–1996
14. Todd Deratany 1996–1998
15. Robert Cochran 1998–2002
16. Daniel Trott 2002–2006
17. Robert Cochran 2006–2008
18. David Berkman 2008–2022
19. Mark McDermott 2022-now

== Economy ==
=== Personal income ===
Economic characteristics, as of 2019:

- In labor force, 1,228 of total 2,865 population
- Travel time to work, minutes – 24.2%
- Median household income in 1999 dollars – $59,773 ($41,994)
- Median household income – $83,365 (compared to US average of $65,712)
- Families below poverty level – 8.86 (compared to US average of 12.3%)
- Median Home Value - $374,500

=== Events ===
The following events occur annually:

- July Craft Show at Nance Park
- Witch Way 5K run and Halloween Party in Nance Park in October
- Indialantic Boardwalk Sprint Distance Triathlon, June
- Annual Christmas Tree Lighting at Nance Park, December

== Education ==
There are two local schools, both of which lie outside the city boundaries in the adjacent unincorporated part of Indialantic; they are under the jurisdiction of the Brevard Public Schools: Indialantic Elementary and Hoover Middle School. The state evaluated Hoover "Grade A" from 2000 to 2008.

In 2005, Hoover contained grades 7 and 8. There were 512 students and 32 teachers, for a ratio of 16:1. 11.3% qualified for free or reduced lunch. Indialantic Elementary contained grades pre-kindergarten though sixth. There were 812 students and 54 teachers for a ratio of 15:1. 13.3% qualified for free or reduced lunch.

== Media ==
Indialantic is served by Florida Today, The Hometown News Brevard edition, and Space Coast Daily newspapers.

== Infrastructure ==
=== Roads ===
Travelocity named route A1A, which runs along the Brevard shore, as the "Best Driving Route" in Florida. This runs close to the ocean. A secondary major route, paralleling it, is Riverside, which is close to the Indian River.

The Florida Department of Transportation maintains A1A and 192. Brevard County maintains North Riverside Drive. The town maintains 95,568 feet (29.129 km) of roadway. Most blocks are 650 feet (200 m) long.

See State Roads in Florida for explanation of numbering system.

- U.S. Route 192 – "Fifth Avenue"
- SR A1A – Miramar Avenue
- Riverside Drive – 10,000 vehicles used this road daily in 2010. It runs throughout the length of Indialantic including "greater Indialantic" in the county

== Notable people ==
- Brian Bollinger — NFL player
- Kyle Carr — soccer player
- Kathy Johnson — gymnast
- Ernest Kouwen-Hoven — businessman
- Robert F. Marx — pioneer scuba diver and author
- Pat Neshek — MLB pitcher for the Philadelphia Phillies
- Stefanie Scott — actress
- John Siptroth — U.S. politician and public figure
