= Pineda, Florida =

Former village in Florida, U.S.

Pineda is a former village in Brevard County, Florida, United States.

== History ==
The original settlement was near the FEC track at the west end of Anderson Way, (known on some plats as Pineda Park). Two developers, E.C. and Anna Dearborn, arrived in November 1894 and began to survey the area. Their recorded plat, "Plat of the Town of Pineda", showed hundreds of subdivided house lots. The main street, Pineda Avenue, was renamed Suntree Boulevard. One early land speculator in Pineda was John Aspinwall, who gave his name to today's Aspinwall Street. Many large landowners surrounded early Pineda, including the Duda family, Parrot family, Haskins, C.J. Hart, and the Stewart family. The Pineda Causeway, named after this place, carries four lanes of State Road 404 1.8 miles (2.9 km) south of the former village. It is located at the intersection of Suntree Boulevard and U.S. Route 1 east of Suntree and the Florida East Coast Railroad.

== Geography ==
Pineda is located at 28°13′47″N 80°40′16″W. (28°13"47 N -80°40'16 W).

The village has 33 homes, including eight riverfront homes. The residential streets are: Third Street, Aspinwall Avenue, Gannet Plaza Avenue, Friendship Place, Ernest Sand Road, 2nd Street, Turner Road, and Byham Road.

=== Surrounding areas ===
- Bonaventure, Florida
- Indian River; Lotus
- Palm Shores
- Suntree

== Rotary Park at Suntree ==
A 10 acres (4.0 ha) community river park is situated at the junction of Suntree Boulevard and U.S. Route 1, on the shore of the Indian River Lagoon. The park is listed in the State of Florida Great Florida Birding Trail, and is home to Waders, Shorebirds; Migratory Ducks, Loon and Grebe (winter).
