= 5054 =

5054 may refer to:

- The year 5054 BC
- The year 5054 AD
- The planet 5054 Keil
- Florida State Road 5054
