= Old Melbourne Beach Town Hall =

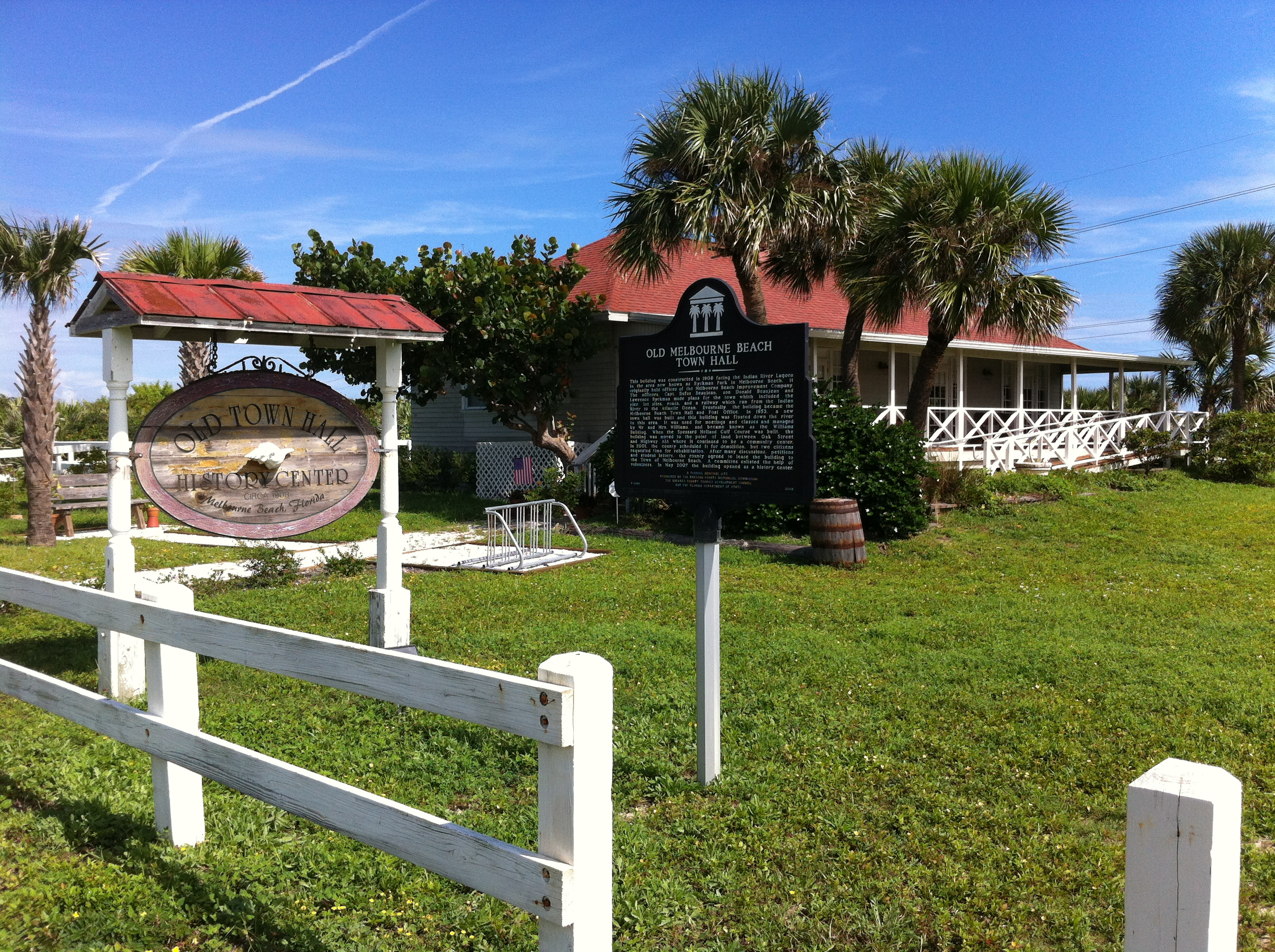
- Old Melbourne Beach Town Hall
- Interactive map of the Old Melbourne Beach Town Hall area

General information
- Location: 2372 Oak Street; Melbourne Beach, Florida, United States
- Coordinates: 28.05023°N 80.54972°W
- Construction started: 1908

Technical details
- Structural system: Wood

The Old Melbourne Beach Town Hall is a historic building currently located at 2372 Oak Street, Melbourne Beach, Florida, United States. This building was built in 1908 at Ryckman Park as the offices of the Melbourne Beach Improvement Company. The building was moved to its present location in 1953 and it currently houses the Old Town Hall History Center.

== Old Town Hall History Center ==
The Old Town Hall History Center is a museum located in the Old Melbourne Beach Town Hall building. The museum contains exhibits on the history of the local area, including Ais Indians, Spanish shipwrecks and the development of Melbourne Beach.

Old Town Hall History Center
- Established: 2007
- Location: Old Melbourne Beach Town Hall
- Type: Local History
