= Florida State Road 5054 =

State road in Melbourne, Florida, US

State Road 5054
- SR 5054 highlighted in red

Route information
- Maintained by FDOT
- Length: 1.384 mi (2.227 km)
- Existed: 1980s–present

Major junctions
- West end: SR 518 in Melbourne
- East end: Wickham Road in Melbourne

Location
- Country: United States
- State: Florida
- Counties: Brevard

Highway system
- Florida State Highway System; Interstate; US; State; Former; Pre‑1945; Toll; Scenic
← SR 5052	→ SR 9336

Florida State Road 5054, known locally as Sarno Road, is a 1.4-mile-long (2.3 km) east–west highway in central Melbourne, Florida (formerly Eau Gallie). Its western terminus is at Florida State Road 518, a half mile east of I-95; its eastern terminus is an intersection with Wickham Road and Sarno Road. The road is completely unsigned.

== Route description ==
State Road 5054 begins at the intersection of Florida State Road 518, with the road taking a slight southeast turn before heading straight east through industrial and commercial land to the south, and the American Muscle Car Museum to the north, from the western terminus to Wickham Road. East of Wickham Road, Sarno Road becomes CR 5054.

== History ==
State Road 5054 is entirely composed of a former configuration of State Road 518. When West Eau Gallie Boulevard was completed in the 1980s, SR 518 was resigned on the new road, with the portion of Sarno Road about 1/2 mile (0.8 km) west of I-95, east to Wickham Road was renumbered as SR 5054. The section of Sarno Road west of the then-new West Eau Gallie Boulevard was renamed West Eau Gallie Boulevard.

== Major junctions ==
The entire route is in Melbourne, Brevard County.

mi	km	Destinations	Notes
0.000	0.000	SR 518 (Eau Gallie Boulevard) to I-95	
1.384	2.227	Wickham Road (CR 509)	
1.000 mi = 1.609 km; 1.000 km = 0.621 mi
