= Melbourne Beach, Florida =

Town in the state of Florida, United States

- Town
- Town of Melbourne Beach
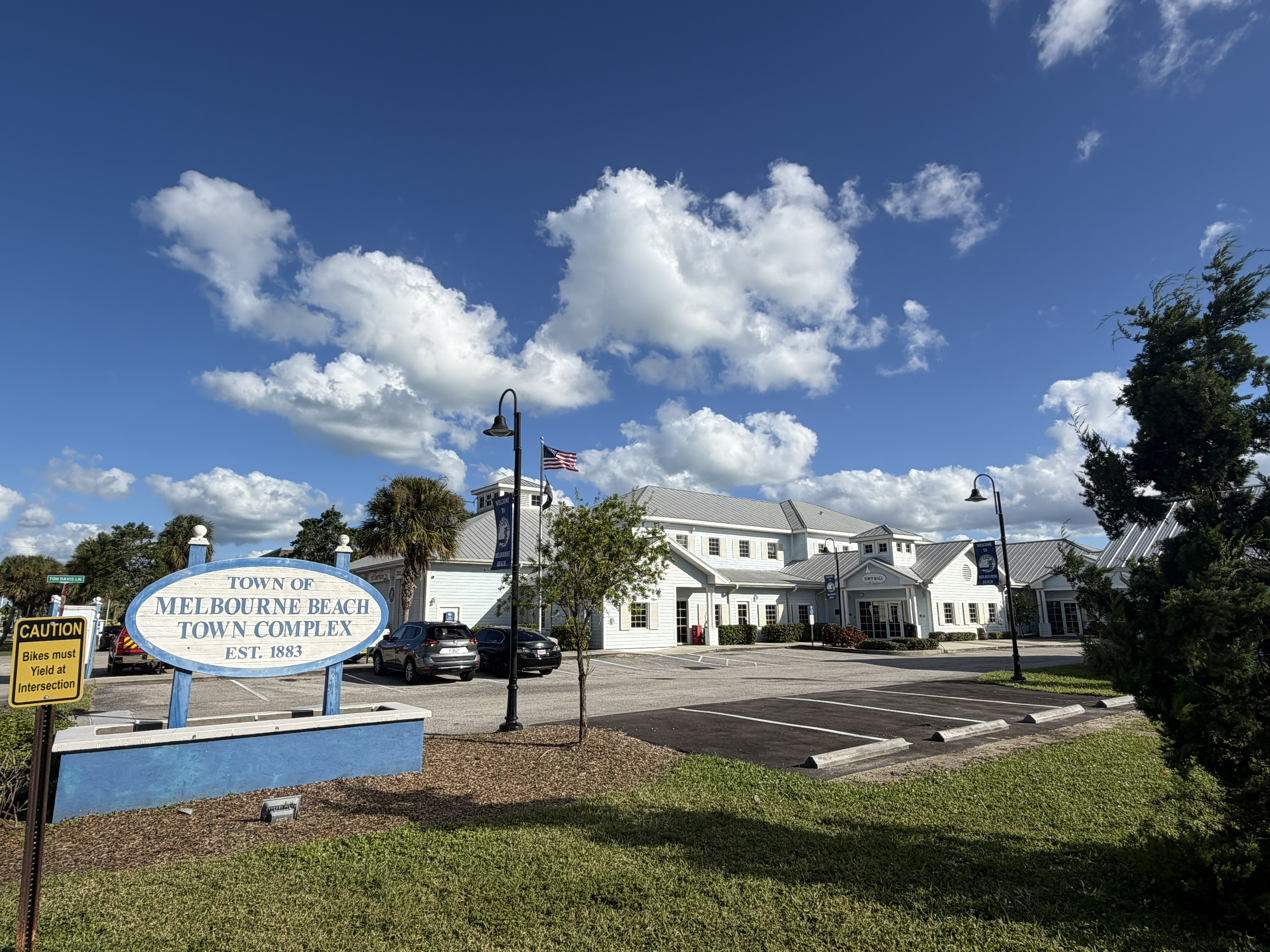
- Melbourne Beach Town Hall

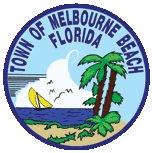
- Seal

- Location in Brevard County and the state of Florida

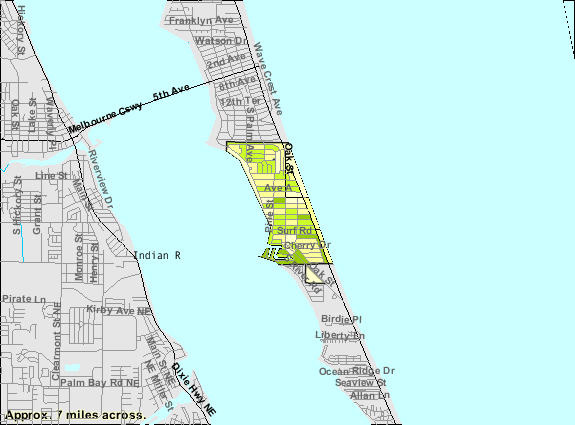
- U.S. Census Bureau map showing town boundaries
- Coordinates: 28°04′01″N 80°33′32″W
- Country: United States
- State: Florida
- County: Brevard
- Settled: 1879
- Incorporated: 1923

Government
  - Type: Commission-Manager
  - Mayor: Alison Dennington
  - Vice Mayor: Terry Cronin
  - Commissioners: Anna Butler, Tim Reed, and Sherri Quarrie
  - Town Manager: A. Marie Smith
  - Town Clerk: Cyd Jones

Area
  - Total: 1.40 sq mi (3.63 km^{2})
  - Land: 0.99 sq mi (2.56 km^{2})
  - Water: 0.41 sq mi (1.07 km^{2})
- Elevation: 13 ft (4.0 m)

Population (2020)
  - Total: 3,231
  - Density: 3,271.6/sq mi (1,263.18/km^{2})
- Time zone: UTC-5 (Eastern (EST))
  - Summer (DST): UTC-4 (EDT)
- ZIP code: 32951
- Area code: 321
- FIPS code: 12-44000
- GNIS feature ID: 2406142
- Website: www.MelbourneBeachFL.org

Melbourne Beach (/ˈmɛlbɛrn/ MEL-burn) is a town in Brevard County, Florida, United States. It is part of the Palm Bay–Melbourne–Titusville, Florida Metropolitan Statistical Area. The population had 3,231 residents at the 2020 United States Census, up from 3,101 at the 2010 census.

== History ==
The Ais Indians resided in the area in pre-Columbian times. In 2010, a midden near Aquarina included a burial ground for a chief and two handmaidens.

It has been suggested that Juan Ponce de León landed near Melbourne Beach in 1513, where he then became the first European to set foot in Florida. A determination of this was made by a historian in the 1990s, who believed that the spot was "within five to eight nautical miles" on the barrier island with a proposed name of Ponce de León Island. However, this suggestion has not been met with wide acceptance from historians who state that de Leon's landing place cannot be known within a leeway of less than a hundred miles or so. A statue of Ponce de León was erected at "Juan Ponce de León Landing" in Melbourne Beach to commemorate his discovery.

Melbourne Beach is Brevard County's oldest beach community.

In 1879, a hotel, the Oak Lodge, was built for researchers and naturalists on a 164-acre (66 ha) location near Aquarina.

In 1921, the Melbourne Causeway was built, connecting Melbourne Beach to the mainland via the town of Indialantic. In 1923, the Town of Melbourne Beach was officially incorporated as a municipality.

The town's population oscillated until World War II, when it began growing steadily. Currently, it is largely residential, with an elementary school, some businesses, and many condominiums in the unincorporated areas to the north and south.

In 2007, it was voted one of ten best bargain retirement spots in America.

In 2016, a Publix located four miles south of Melbourne Beach sold one of the winning tickets in the $1.3 billion Powerball.

== Geography ==
Melbourne Beach is situated on the barrier island that separates the Indian River Lagoon from the Atlantic Ocean. This island, approximately 40 miles (64 km) in length, stretches from Cape Canaveral to the north to the Sebastian Inlet to the south. Melbourne Beach is bordered by the town of Indialantic to the north.

According to the United States Census Bureau, the town has a total area of 1.3 square miles (3.3 km^{2}). 1.0 square miles (2.7 km^{2}) of it is land and 0.2 square miles (0.6 km^{2}) of it (19.53%) is water.

=== Climate ===
The Town of Melbourne Beach is part of the humid subtropical climate zone with a Köppen Climate Classification of "Cfa" (C = mild temperate, f = fully humid, and a = hot summer).

Climate data for Melbourne Beach A1A, Florida, 1991–2020 normals
Month	Jan	Feb	Mar	Apr	May	Jun	Jul	Aug	Sep	Oct	Nov	Dec	Year
Mean daily maximum °F (°C)	70.5 (21.4)	71.9 (22.2)	75.5 (24.2)	80.1 (26.7)	83.7 (28.7)	87.4 (30.8)	89.5 (31.9)	89.5 (31.9)	87.7 (30.9)	83.5 (28.6)	77.5 (25.3)	72.3 (22.4)	80.8 (27.1)
Daily mean °F (°C)	62.1 (16.7)	63.9 (17.7)	67.4 (19.7)	72.4 (22.4)	76.5 (24.7)	80.2 (26.8)	81.8 (27.7)	82.1 (27.8)	81.1 (27.3)	77.0 (25.0)	70.5 (21.4)	65.0 (18.3)	73.3 (22.9)
Mean daily minimum °F (°C)	53.6 (12.0)	55.9 (13.3)	59.3 (15.2)	64.6 (18.1)	69.3 (20.7)	72.9 (22.7)	74.1 (23.4)	74.6 (23.7)	74.5 (23.6)	70.5 (21.4)	63.5 (17.5)	57.7 (14.3)	65.9 (18.8)
Average precipitation inches (mm)	2.66 (68)	2.42 (61)	1.68 (43)	2.47 (63)	4.17 (106)	5.50 (140)	5.20 (132)	4.87 (124)	7.55 (192)	4.90 (124)	2.61 (66)	2.49 (63)	46.52 (1,182)
Source: NOAA

=== Fauna ===
Shorebirds include black-bellied plovers, red knots (winter), gannets, seabirds (offshore), and red-throated loons (winter).

== Demographics ==
Historical population
Census	Pop.	Note	%±
1930	72		—
1940	90		25.0%
1950	230		155.6%
1960	1,004		336.5%
1970	2,262		125.3%
1980	2,713		19.9%
1990	3,021		11.4%
2000	3,335		10.4%
2010	3,101		−7.0%
2020	3,231		4.2%
U.S. Decennial Census

=== Racial and ethnic composition ===
Melbourne Beach racial composition (Hispanics excluded from racial categories) (NH = Non-Hispanic)
Race	Pop 2010	Pop 2020	% 2010	% 2020
White (NH)	2,919	2,892	94.13%	89.51%
Black or African American (NH)	14	13	0.45%	0.40%
Native American or Alaska Native (NH)	6	0	0.19%	0.00%
Asian (NH)	33	24	1.06%	0.74%
Pacific Islander or Native Hawaiian (NH)	0	0	0.00%	0.00%
Some other race (NH)	2	10	0.06%	0.31%
Two or more races/Multiracial (NH)	27	105	0.87%	3.25%
Hispanic or Latino (any race)	100	187	3.22%	5.79%
Total	3,101	3,231		

=== 2020 census ===
As of the 2020 census, Melbourne Beach had a population of 3,231. The median age was 52.0 years. 17.6% of residents were under the age of 18 and 26.2% of residents were 65 years of age or older. For every 100 females there were 103.8 males, and for every 100 females age 18 and over there were 102.2 males age 18 and over.

100.0% of residents lived in urban areas, while 0.0% lived in rural areas.

There were 1,384 households in Melbourne Beach, of which 24.6% had children under the age of 18 living in them. Of all households, 57.6% were married-couple households, 18.1% were households with a male householder and no spouse or partner present, and 20.4% were households with a female householder and no spouse or partner present. About 27.1% of all households were made up of individuals and 12.4% had someone living alone who was 65 years of age or older.

There were 1,595 housing units, of which 13.2% were vacant. The homeowner vacancy rate was 1.2% and the rental vacancy rate was 10.6%.

As of 2015, the top 10 largest self-reported ancestry groups in Melbourne Beach, Florida are English (18.5%), German (15.2%), Italian (11.4%), Irish (10.4%), "American" (8.1%), Greek (5.7%), Scots-Irish (4.3%), French (except Basque) (4.1%), Scottish (2.9%), and Swedish (2.4%).

In the 2016-2020 American Community Survey 5-year estimates, there were 874 families residing in the town.

=== 2010 census ===
As of the 2010 United States census, there were 3,101 people, 1,271 households, and 867 families residing in the town.

=== 2000 census ===
As of the census of 2000, there were 3,335 people, 1,422 households, and 992 families residing in the town. The population density was 3,243.5 inhabitants per square mile (1,252.3/km^{2}). There were 1,556 housing units at an average density of 1,513.3 per square mile (584.3/km^{2}). The racial makeup of the town was 97.51% White, 0.09% Black, 0.12% Native American, 0.99% Asian, 0.24% from other races, and 1.05% from two or more races. Hispanic or Latino of any race were 2.28% of the population.

In 2000, there were 1,422 households, out of which 25.7% had children under the age of 18 living with them, 61.7% were married couples living together, 5.5% had a female householder with no husband present, and 30.2% were non-families. 23.9% of all households were made up of individuals, and 11.7% had someone living alone who was 65 years of age or older. The average household size was 2.35 and the average family size was 2.77.

In 2000, in the town, the population was spread out, with 20.1% under the age of 18, 4.0% from 18 to 24, 24.6% from 25 to 44, 28.9% from 45 to 64, and 22.5% who were 65 years of age or older. The median age was 46 years. For every 100 females, there were 103.2 males. For every 100 females age 18 and over, there were 99.3 males.

In 2000, the median income for a household in the town is $57,035, and the median income for a family is $62,139. Males have a median income of $46,424 versus $34,028 for females. The per capita income for the town is $31,489. 3.8% of the population and 1.6% of families are below the poverty line. Out of the total people living in poverty, 0.0% are under the age of 18 and 2.2% are 65 or older.

== Government ==
In 2007, the town had a taxable real estate base of $371.45 million.

Mayors (1982-present day)
- Bud Conroy (1982–1984)
- Jean Becker (1984–1986)
- Richard Coston (1986–1989)
- James Lawrence (1989–1997)
- Robert Wille (1997–2002)
- Mark Crispen (2003–resigned before end of term)
- Steve Walters (2003–2004 interim mayor)
- William Stacey (2004–2007)
- Rita A. Karpie (2007–2011 died before end of term)
- Jean Marshall (2011 interim mayor through Nov. 2011)
- Tom Davis (2012–2013 Resigned before the end of term )
- Rocco Maglio (May 2013–August 2013 Resigned before the end of term)
- John Gurecki (September 2013, Appointed by vote of three remaining commission members)
- James Simmons (November 2013 – August 2021)
- Alison Dennington (August 2021 – Present)

== Economy ==
=== Personal income ===
In 2010, the median income for a household in the town was $87,035, and the median income for a family was $62,139. Males had a median income of $46,424 versus $34,028 for females. The per capita income for the town was $31,489. About 1.6% of families and 3.8% of the population were below the poverty line, including none of those under age 18 and 2.2% of those age 65 or over.

Median home value was $321,498.00 in 2010.

Melbourne Beach is second in Brevard County for per capita income and 124 out of 887 places.

== Industry ==
=== Tourism ===
Coconut Point Park is a 36.9-acre (14.9 ha) community beachside park and sea turtle nesting site. The park is listed in the state of Florida Great Florida Birding Trail.

== Points of interest ==
- Melbourne Beach Pier
- Old Melbourne Beach Town Hall
- Ryckman Park

== Notable people ==
- Bobby Dall, musician, bass player for rock band Poison
- Randy Fine (born 1974), U.S. Representative and gambling industry executive
- Jorja Fox, American actress and producer
- Doug Flutie, football player
- James Henry Gillis, Rear Admiral
- Caroline Marks, Olympic surfer
- Norma Metrolis, baseball player
- Pat Neshek, pitcher for the St. Louis Cardinals
- Homer Rodeheaver, music arranger for Billy Sunday
- Kate Chastain, reality tv star of “Below Deck” fame
