= Ernest Kouwen-Hoven =

Ernest Kouwen-Hoven (1875–1940) was a Dutch-born American businessman who founded Indialantic, Florida.

== Biography ==
Kouwen-Hoven came to the United States at the age of 20 from the Netherlands. In 1908, his son, Jack, was born. His daughter, Phylis, followed in 1910. In 1915, the family arrived in Melbourne, Florida from California. He purchased land and platted it in 1916, thus founding Indialantic, Florida. The plat was later revised in 1919. In the same year, he began construction of his toll bridge across the Indian River. His original "Indialantic, Florida Land Sales" office, which was destroyed by fire in 1919, was built on Front Street in Melbourne.

During construction of his bridge he set up three sawmills throughout Brevard County. The first one was in Melbourne Village, the second in Merritt Island and the last one 5 miles west of Grant. In 1921 his bridge was complete.

In the 1920s, Ernest, along with Charles Steward, Claud Edge, L. G. McDowell, F.C. Powell and Ernest Every created the Melbourne Golf Course and Country Club in 1920. It is now the Melbourne Municipal Golf Course. In 1925, the pre-historic body of a human, dubbed the "Melbourne Man", was found there. The site can be seen from the ball fields of the Florida Preparatory Academy.

In 1923, he built a grand home, Magnolia Manor. It was to be part of the Magnolia Park subdivision, but it never materialized. Parts of the original property have been replatted, including Magnolia Manor. This house was eventually purchased by a Robert Widrig. Mr. Widrig added 2 wings and called it the Lincoln Hotel. It ultimately failed and was revitalized as The Belcelona in 1957. The property was sold to the Florida Air Academy in 1961, which is now the Florida Preparatory Academy.

Ernest's wife dedicated the second bridge across the Indian River between Melbourne and Indialantic.
