= Florida Preparatory Academy =

Coordinates: 28.079489°N 80.628093°W

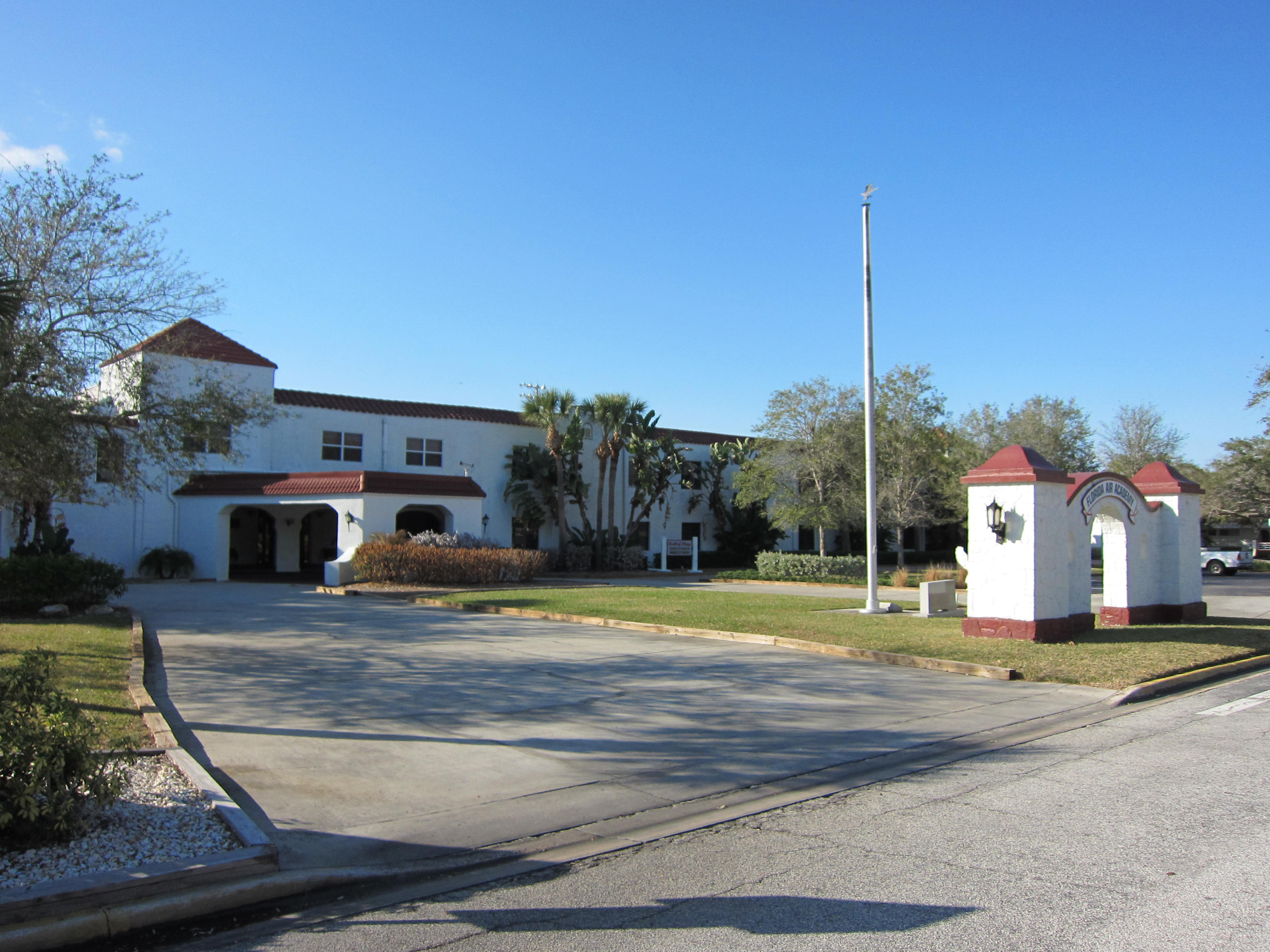
- 1950 S. Academy Drive; Melbourne, Florida, 32901; United States

Information
- Type: Private, boarding & day School
- Established: 1961
- Staff: 30
- Grades: 6-12
- Gender: Co-ed
- Enrollment: 100
- Campus size: 11 acres (4.5 ha)
- Colors: Navy & White
- Mascot: Falcon
- Nickname: Falcons
- Website: www.flprep.com

Florida Prep, formerly known as Florida Air Academy, is a private boarding and day school founded in 1961 by Jonathan Dwight, located in Melbourne, Florida, United States. Students in grades 5-12 are provided a college-preparatory education that emphasizes leadership, character, accountability, and trust. There are 130 students from 22 countries.

== History ==
Ernest Kouwen-Hoven built the main building in 1925 as his personal residence. It is Mediterranean Revival architecture with Art Deco interior. He used the mansion as his home for only one year, before selling it in 1926 to A.S. Widrig, who named the property "The Lincoln Hotel." In 1957, the Lincoln Hotel was sold to August J Rimer who renamed the hotel the Belcelona.

In 1961, educator Jonathan Dwight bought the building and founded the Florida Air Academy, patterning the school on the United States Air Force Academy.

For several decades, the former Florida Air Academy operated as a military (Air Force JROTC) boarding/prep school, placing an emphasis on discipline.

Another strong draw to Florida Air Academy was the unique opportunity for students to enroll in flight training at the Florida Institute of Technology, where they could earn their Private Pilot License and multi-engine ratings. Consequently, the school served as a springboard for future military and commercial airline pilots who went on to continue their careers at aeronautical universities and flight schools throughout the nation.

In 2015, President James Dwight announced a change to the school name. In June 2015, the school became Florida Preparatory Academy, or Florida Prep for short.

Despite the name change from Florida Air Academy to Florida Preparatory Academy, the Florida Air Academy Alumni Association remains active with the contribution of students from the former Air Force JROTC school. The Alumni Association organizes annual events during Florida Prep Academy's Homecoming celebrations and is attended by hundreds who return to the Melbourne Area for fellowship and continued support for the organization.

== Academics ==
The academy is accredited by AdvancedED, formally known as the Southern Association of Colleges and Schools and the Florida Council of Independent Schools.

In 2015, class sizes ranged from 5 to 20 students, and averaged 13. AP classes, Honors classes and Dual Enrollment classes are offered (Dual Enrollment at nearby Florida Tech and Eastern Florida State College). A Teacher Help period occurs after school and students are encouraged to see their teachers for help with homework or other questions. A formal "Academic Assistance Program" is in place for students needing additional academic motivation and instruction.

Graduates have had a 100% rate of acceptance by colleges since 1978.

== Student body ==
In 2023, there were 130 students. Day students were admitted in the 1980s and comprised 50% of the student body. Boarding students are from across the USA and beyond and represent 22 different countries.

Boarding students live with one or two other roommates, depending on the size of the room. Each room has beds, desks, swivel chairs, and wall lockers. Students are allowed to have a footlocker for additional storage. Boarding students arise at 7:15 a.m. They have breakfast at the dining hall until 8:00. All dormitories are inspected in the morning to ensure cleanliness. Day students must be on campus by 8:15 to attend class at 8:30 a.m. Students wear branded polo shirts and shorts or slacks. Various opportunities occur during the school year to wear personal clothing, and students may wear their own clothing when leaving campus on the weekend for outings.

The campus consists of a landscaped 11 acres (4.5 ha) and contains the largest collection of historic buildings in Brevard County. It includes an outdoor stage and gymnasium, athletic fields and tennis courts. A city golf course is located across the street and several pools are nearby. The school day is made up of eight class periods, with a five-minute passing period between classes. The last class ends at 3:40 p.m. Boarding students are given the option of going home for the weekend or to remain on campus. If the student stays on campus, a variety of activities are available, including trips to Orlando, visits to the local beach, ice skating, bowling, and trips to the local movies and mall.

== Recognition ==
- Boys basketball Class 3A State Champions 1998, 2001, 2003, 2005, 2007
- [Sasha Kaun] was one of the star players at Florida Air Academy during its period of State Championships
- Boys baseball Class 3A State Champions 1998
- Boys baseball Class 2A State Champions 1992–1993 season
- Class 3A State Champion, triple jump, long jump, high jump
- F.A.A. has had three Olympic athletes who have won two bronze medals.
- Girls basketball Class 2A State Champions 2018–2019, 2019-2020

== Notable alumni ==
- Jade Cargill, professional wrestler
- Prince Fielder, retired professional baseball player; attended FPA for three years
- Walter Hodge (2005), starting point guard for the Florida Gators
- Sasha Kaun (2004), former basketball player for the Kansas Jayhawks, played professional basketball for Cleveland Cavaliers
- Andy González (2001), professional baseball player
- Glenn Standridge (attended 1989–91), Grammy-winning multi-platinum R&B producer and audio mixing engineer.
- Jorge Padilla (1998), outfielder, Triple-A Buffalo.
- Lonn Reisman, American basketball coach and athletic director
- Leevan Sands, (2000), Olympic bronze medalist, Bahamas national record holder in triple jump
- Carmelo Ríos Santiago (1991), Puerto Rican senator
