= South Patrick Shores, Florida =

- CDP
- Location in Brevard County and the state of Florida
- Coordinates: 28°12′10″N 80°37′18″W
- Country: United States
- State: Florida
- County: Brevard

Area
  - Total: 3.21 sq mi (8.32 km^{2})
  - Land: 1.51 sq mi (3.92 km^{2})
  - Water: 1.70 sq mi (4.40 km^{2})
- Elevation: 7 ft (2.1 m)

Population (2020)
  - Total: 6,496
  - Density: 4,293.5/sq mi (1,657.73/km^{2})
- Time zone: UTC-5 (Eastern (EST))
  - Summer (DST): UTC-4 (EDT)
- ZIP code: 32937
- Area code: 321
- FIPS code: 12-67725
- GNIS feature ID: 2402875

South Patrick Shores is a census-designated place (CDP) in Brevard County, Florida, United States. The population was 6,496 at the 2020 census, up from 5,875 at the 2010 census. It is part of the Palm Bay–Melbourne–Titusville, Florida Metropolitan Statistical Area.

== Geography ==
According to the United States Census Bureau, the CDP has a total area of 2.9 square miles (7.4 km^{2}), of which 1.4 square miles (3.7 km^{2}) is land and 1.4 square miles (3.6 km^{2}), or 49.34%, is water.

=== Surrounding areas ===
- Atlantic Ocean
- Patrick Space Force Base
- Satellite Beach
- Banana River; Merritt Island; Tropic

== Demographics ==
Historical population
Census	Pop.	Note	%±
1990	10,249		—
2000	8,913		−13.0%
2010	5,875		−34.1%
2020	6,496		10.6%
U.S. Decennial Census

=== 2020 census ===
As of the 2020 census, South Patrick Shores had a population of 6,496. The median age was 52.8 years. 15.5% of residents were under the age of 18 and 26.8% of residents were 65 years of age or older. For every 100 females there were 98.7 males, and for every 100 females age 18 and over there were 97.0 males age 18 and over.

100.0% of residents lived in urban areas, while 0.0% lived in rural areas.

There were 2,980 households in South Patrick Shores, of which 20.8% had children under the age of 18 living in them. Of all households, 49.1% were married-couple households, 19.5% were households with a male householder and no spouse or partner present, and 25.1% were households with a female householder and no spouse or partner present. About 30.2% of all households were made up of individuals and 14.6% had someone living alone who was 65 years of age or older.

There were 3,414 housing units, of which 12.7% were vacant. The homeowner vacancy rate was 1.3% and the rental vacancy rate was 11.1%.

Racial composition as of the 2020 census
Race	Number	Percent
White	5,612	86.4%
Black or African American	52	0.8%
American Indian and Alaska Native	17	0.3%
Asian	151	2.3%
Native Hawaiian and Other Pacific Islander	8	0.1%
Some other race	64	1.0%
Two or more races	592	9.1%
Hispanic or Latino (of any race)	425	6.5%

=== 2000 census ===
As of the 2000 census, there were 8,913 people, 3,563 households, and 2,668 families residing in the CDP. The population density was 4,331.3 inhabitants per square mile (1,672.3/km^{2}). There were 4,197 housing units at an average density of 2,039.5 per square mile (787.5/km^{2}). The racial makeup of the CDP was 90.44% White, 3.65% African American, 0.53% Native American, 2.09% Asian, 0.06% Pacific Islander, 0.93% from other races, and 2.31% from two or more races. Hispanic or Latino of any race were 4.97% of the population.

There were 3,563 households, out of which 31.7% had children under the age of 18 living with them, 63.9% were married couples living together, 7.8% had a female householder with no husband present, and 25.1% were non-families. 20.9% of all households were made up of individuals, and 11.1% had someone living alone who was 65 years of age or older. The average household size was 2.50 and the average family size was 2.89.

In the CDP, the population was spread out, with 24.0% under the age of 18, 5.3% from 18 to 24, 29.0% from 25 to 44, 22.3% from 45 to 64, and 19.4% who were 65 years of age or older. The median age was 40 years. For every 100 females, there were 97.8 males. For every 100 females age 18 and over, there were 93.9 males.

The median income for a household in the CDP was $48,197, and the median income for a family was $53,231. Males had a median income of $36,358 versus $26,535 for females. The per capita income for the CDP was $22,904. About 3.8% of families and 4.6% of the population were below the poverty line, including 7.7% of those under age 18 and 2.2% of those age 65 or over.

== Infrastructure ==
=== Roads ===
Travelocity.com named route A1A as the "Best Driving Route" in Florida. This runs close to the ocean. A secondary major route, paralleling it, is South Patrick Drive, which is close to the Banana River.

The Florida Department of Transportation maintains 513 and A1A.

See State Roads in Florida for explanation of numbering system.

- SR A1A - Miramar Avenue
- S 513 - South Patrick Drive
