= Ryckman Park =

Park in Florida, United States

- Interactive map of Ryckman Park
- Type: Public park / historic area
- Location: 519 Ocean Avenue; Melbourne Beach
- Coordinates: 28.0680°N 80.5655°W
- Status: Open all year

Ryckman Park is a public park located on Ocean Avenue in Melbourne Beach, Florida on the Indian River in the historic section of town. The park is in the historic section of Melbourne Beach and contains the Town Hall, the Melbourne Beach Community Center (formerly the Women's Club), a playground, several gazebos and the Melbourne Beach Pier. The former Villa Marine Hotel, built in 1912, is across the street and the Community Chapel of Melbourne Beach is nearby.

== Ryckman House ==
The historic Ryckman House, one of the first homes in Melbourne Beach, is located in the park. The Florida-Vernacular style house was built in 1890 and was the home of G. E. Ryckman for 70 years.

== Beaujean Home and Post Office ==
There is a replica of the Beaujean home and first post office at Ryckman Park.
