= Florida State Road 518 =

Highway in Florida

State Road 518
- Eau Gallie Boulevard
- SR 518 in red, SR 5054 in blue

Route information
- Maintained by FDOT
- Length: 8.099 mi (13.034 km)

Major junctions
- West end: I-95 near Melbourne
- US 1 in Melbourne
- East end: SR A1A in Indian Harbour Beach

Location
- Country: United States
- State: Florida

Highway system
- Florida State Highway System; Interstate; US; State; Former; Pre‑1945; Toll; Scenic
← SR 517	→ SR 519

State Road 518 (SR 518), also called Eau Gallie Boulevard, is a short but major east–west highway with a western terminus at Interstate 95 on the Florida mainland, crossing the Indian River via the Eau Gallie Causeway (and intersecting the southern end of SR 513), and having its eastern terminus at SR A1A. Most of SR 518 is located within the city of Melbourne.

== Route description ==
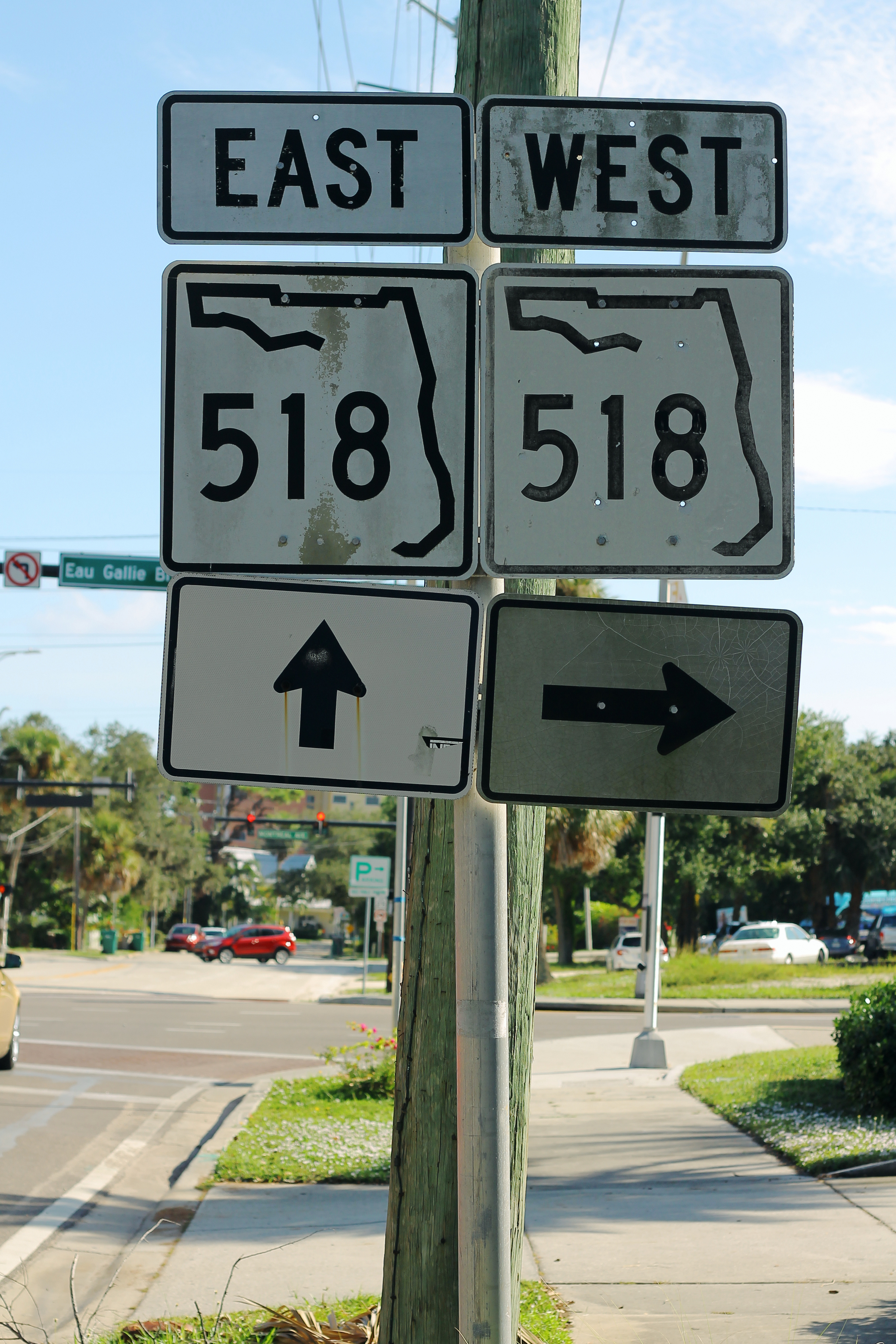
Signs for Florida State Road 518 in the Eau Gallie neighborhood of Melbourne, Florida.

State Road 518 begins at Exit 183 of I-95, and continues east on Eau Gallie Boulevard through a recently built suburban area. About 1/2 mile east of the I-95 interchange, it intersects Sarno Road, State Road 5054, and the former route of SR 518. The road continues through sparsely developed land until its intersection with County Road 509 (Wickham Road), where SR 518 continues through a denser area, passing through mostly commercial business, with residential areas not far away. At US 1, the road splits into a one way pair of Montreal Avenue and Eau Gallie Boulevard making its way to the Eau Gallie Causeway, which takes SR 518 across the Indian River. At the east end of the causeway, it intersects State Road 513, entering Indian Harbour Beach. It passes through more commercial developments for the rest of the route, where it ends at State Road A1A, just west of the beach and the Atlantic Ocean.

== History ==
In 1964, the interchange between Eau Gallie and I-95 opened, which was reconstructed in 2009.

Eau Gallie Boulevard and the Eau Gallie Causeway were both named after a city that merged with Melbourne in 1969.

Originally, SR 518 traveled along Sarno Road from its western terminus at I-95 to U.S. Route 1 (SR 5), then followed US 1 (Harbor City Boulevard) to East Eau Gallie Boulevard and east to SR A1A via the Eau Gallie Causeway. Upon the completion of West Eau Gallie Boulevard in the 1980s, the sign for the I-95 exit to SR 518 changed the name of the street from "Sarno Road" to "Eau Gallie Boulevard" and SR 518 was re-routed to its current configuration.

== Major intersections ==
The entire route is in Brevard County.

Location	mi	km	Destinations	Notes
	0.000	0.000	I-95 (SR 9) – Jacksonville, Miami	west end of state maintenance
Melbourne	0.416	0.669	John Rodes Boulevard (CR 511)	
Melbourne	0.814	1.310	Sarno Road (FL 5054 east)	
Melbourne	2.340	3.766	Wickham Road (CR 509)	
Melbourne	4.913	7.907	US 1 (North Harbor City Boulevard / SR 5) – Airport	
Melbourne	5.490– 6.800	8.835– 10.944	Eau Gallie Causeway over Indian River (Atlantic Intracoastal Waterway)	
Melbourne–Indian Harbour Beach line	6.985	11.241	SR 513 (South Patrick Drive)	
Melbourne–Indian Harbour Beach line	8.048	12.952	SR A1A	
1.000 mi = 1.609 km; 1.000 km = 0.621 mi

=== Traffic ===
Traffic at selected junctions include:

Traffic volume on Florida State Road 518
Location	Volume	
Location	2012 Eastbound	2012 Westbound
0.27 Mi. West of SR-513	16500	18500
0.15 Mi. West of A1A	10000	9400
Volume: Average vehicles per weekday; Source:
