= Georgiana, Florida =

- Interactive map of Georgiana, Florida
- Coordinates: 28°17′19″N 80°40′17″W
- Country: United States of America
- State: Florida
- County: Brevard
- Elevation: 10 ft (3.0 m)
- Time zone: UTC-5 (Eastern (EST))
  - Summer (DST): UTC-4 (EDT)
- ZIP code: 32952
- Area code: 321

Georgiana is a populated place located on Merritt Island in Brevard County, Florida at latitude 28.288673N and longitude 80.671398W. The elevation is 10 feet. It is about five miles south of the 520 Causeway, situated where the island is about a half-mile wide.

== History ==
Historically, the area was used for citrus and pineapple cultivation. There were 24 homesteaders recorded in the settlement in 1889. The early subdivision was divided into narrow strips from the Indian River to the Banana River. A footpath (today's Old Settlement Road) was opened along the Indian River to connect the post office and riverboat landing.

The Georgianna [sic] Church, formerly the Georgianna United Methodist Church, was founded in 1886.

One of the oldest cemeteries in the area is Georgiana Cemetery (also known as Crooked Mile Cemetery).

== Geography ==
Georgiana is located at 28°17′19″N 80°40′17″W. Surrounding areas:

- Merritt
- Banana River
- Lotus
- Indian River

== Notable people ==
- William Whittfield, a botanist and horticulturist, Charles Macgruder, and Dell Munson were early settlers.
