= Merritt Island Causeway =

Bridge in Florida, United States of America

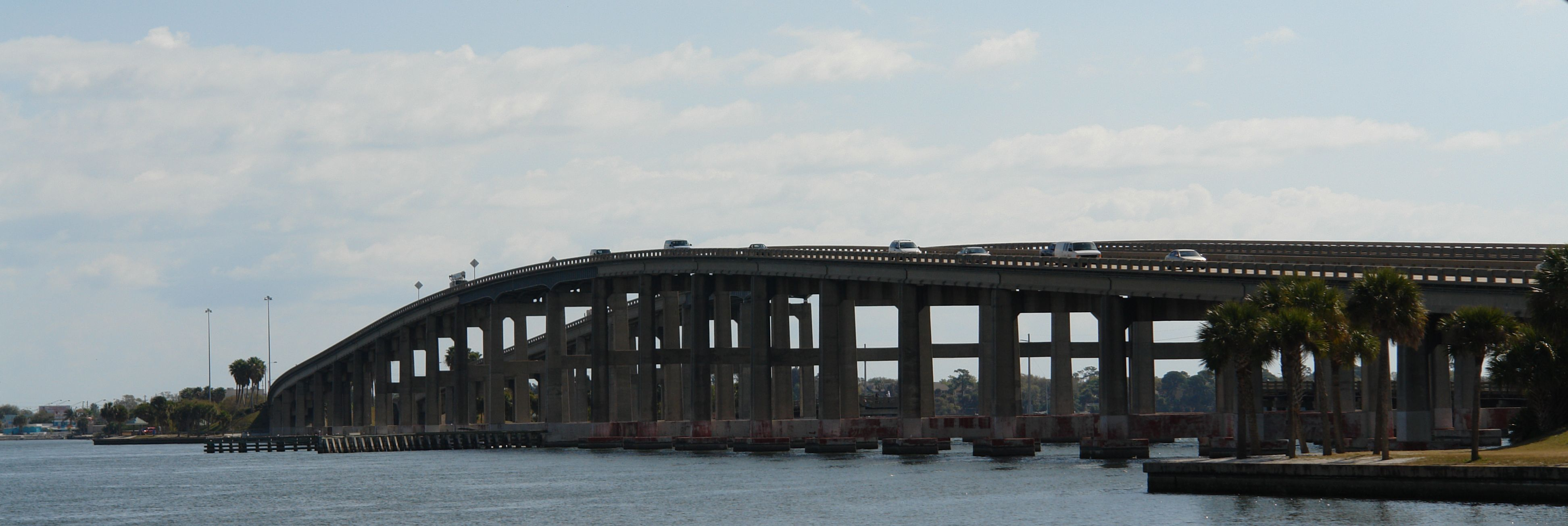
- The Hubert H. Humphrey Bridge connects Merritt Island and Cocoa.
- Coordinates: 28°21′26″N 80°40′33″W
- Locale: Merritt Island

History
- Opened: June 5, 1941
- Replaces: Wooden bridge

Location
- Interactive map of Merritt Island Causeway

The Merritt Island Causeway, mostly in Merritt Island, connects Cocoa, Merritt Island, Florida, and Cocoa Beach, Florida. The causeway transits the Willard Peebles bridge over the Banana River Lagoon. In the 1960s, SR A1A was routed over the eastern causeway from present day SR 520 and SR A1A, to the present day intersection of SR 520 and SR 3 on Merritt Island. The eastern section is known as the Cocoa Beach Causeway.

== First route ==
On May 1, 1917, the first, wooden, bridge opened between Cocoa, Florida, and Merritt Island, Florida, across the Indian River. Soon after this bridge was built, two ideas for a new bridge connecting Merritt Island and Cocoa Beach over the Banana River began circulating.

One route
Cross over Sykes Creek and east to Cocoa Beach
The other route
Cross from Horti Point east to Cocoa Beach.

On September 27, 1919, the first route was approved. The bridge was completed April 19, 1922, after running into financial problems and costing an additional $200,000.

The present day alignment, from west to east, based upon this description

- East Merritt Island Avenue
- Audubon Road
- Old Audubon Road
- Triangle Road
- North Banana River Drive
- Milford Point Drive (formerly part of North Banana River Drive)
- South Banana River Drive (follow south to the start of the bridge)

The narrow lane draw bridge crossed the Banana River near Old Causeway Road on Horti Point. The present day Minuteman Causeway Boulevard in Cocoa Beach, and Old Causeway Road in Angel City are the remaining ends of the Merritt Island Causeway. The bridge system composed of the Indian River Bridge and the Banana River Bridge lasted another 18 years, when growth caught up with the bridge system.

== Second route ==
On June 5, 1941, the present day alignment of SR 520 opened with a single wider lane in each direction. Two draw bridges, one on each river, and a few relief bridges made up the causeway. The original wooden bridges were torn up shortly afterwards. Today, the name Banana River Bridge refers to the eastern causeway of the Emory L. Bennett Causeway, a part of SR 528.

Traffic problems were growing worse in the 1960s, and the county appealed to then Vice President Hubert H. Humphrey for relief. Vice President spoke to NASA and the U.S. Air Force and they agreed to help fund the widening. On August 16, 1962, the road widening was completed. Less than six years later the Hubert H. Humphrey Bridge was dedicated by Hubert H. Humphrey on March 1, 1968.

At nearly the same time there were proposals for additional bridges in the area. Cocoa Avenue (now Minuteman Causeway) was proposed to cross to Merritt Island over the Minuteman Causeway. Its route would have taken it along the old Banana River Bridge. The idea was formally denied on February 26, 1970, by the State of Florida.

Widening projects continue, and the eastern draw bridge has been removed from the causeway.
