= Indian Harbour Beach, Florida =

- City
- City of Indian Harbour Beach
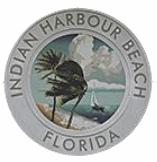
- Seal
- Motto: "The Greatest Little City in Florida!"
- Location in Brevard County and the state of Florida

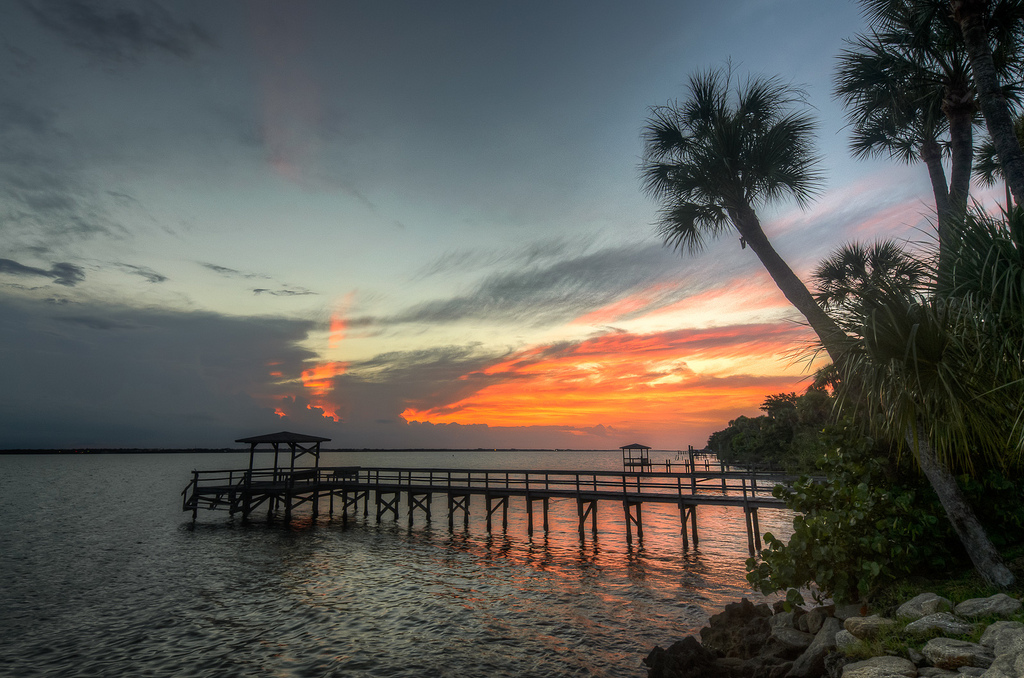
- Coordinates: 28°9′7″N 80°35′42″W
- Country: United States of America
- State: Florida
- County: Brevard
- Incorporated: June 6, 1955

Government
  - Type: Council-Manager
  - Mayor: Scott Nickle
  - Deputy Mayor: Frank Guertin
  - Council Members: Hamilton Boone, Shauna Hume, and Adam Dye
  - City Manager: John W. Coffey
  - City Clerk: Sue Frank

Area
  - Total: 2.67 sq mi (6.91 km^{2})
  - Land: 2.09 sq mi (5.42 km^{2})
  - Water: 0.58 sq mi (1.49 km^{2})
- Elevation: 9.8 ft (3 m)

Population (2020)
  - Total: 9,019
  - Density: 4,310.1/sq mi (1,664.15/km^{2})
- Time zone: UTC-5 (Eastern (EST))
  - Summer (DST): UTC-4 (EDT)
- ZIP code: 32937
- Area code: 321
- FIPS code: 12-33450
- GNIS feature ID: 0284502
- Website: www.indianharbourbeach.org

Indian Harbour Beach is a coastal city in Brevard County, Florida, United States. It is part of the Palm Bay–Melbourne–Titusville, Florida Metropolitan Statistical Area. The population was 9,019 at the 2020 census, up from 8,225 at the 2010 census.

It is 3 miles (4.8 km) north of the town of Indialantic and south of Satellite Beach. It is the first and only community in the United States to be a NOAA Tsunami Ready community along the nation's East Coast.

== History ==
Indian Harbour Beach was founded on June 6, 1955, by W. Lansing Gleason, John H. Neafie, and Louis S. Henry.

In 2013, along with Palm Beach and Sanibel, Indian Harbour Beach ranked among the top 3 places to live in Florida, according to AreaVibes livability score.

== Geography ==
According to the United States Census Bureau, the city has a total area of 2.6 square miles (6.7 km^{2}). 2.1 square miles (5.4 km^{2}) of it is land and 0.5 square miles (1.3 km^{2}), or 18.63%, is water.

=== Fauna ===
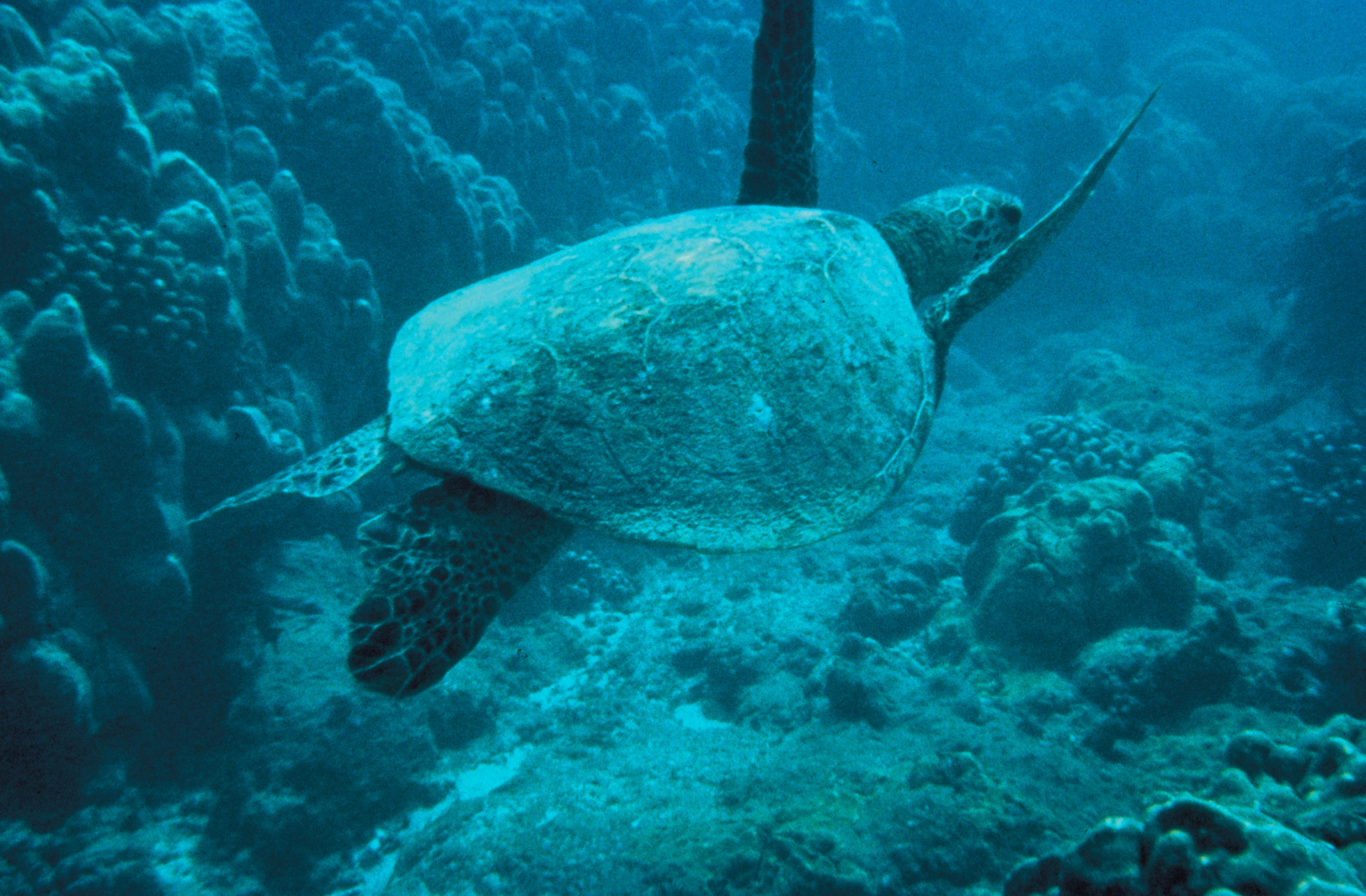
Green sea turtle

Threatened Atlantic loggerhead sea turtles nest on the city's ocean beaches at densities of approximately one nest per 10 feet (3.0 m) of shoreline per year. Endangered green sea turtles deposit an average of tens of nests along the city's ocean beach each year.

Endangered right whales calve off the city's shoreline. Endangered West Indian manatees frequent the city's canals and the Banana River. Bald eagles forage over Samsons Island.

The 12 acres (4.9 ha) of wetland created as mitigation by a local developer on Samsons Island provide nutrient-rich, sheltered aquatic habitat serving as finfish nursery and feeding ground for a diverse assemblage of birds and mammals. The city established Samsons Island Nature Park, the only gopher tortoise relocation recipient site on the barrier island. It is occupied by 42 relocated tortoises and another three which had been living on the island when development began. The city has erected five osprey nesting platforms on Samsons Island Nature Park, from which young have been fledged. Efforts are now under way to create habitat for use by gopher tortoises and scrub jays. The city is working with faculty of the Florida Institute of Technology to promote graduate student research and class projects on Samsons Island Nature Park and to assist in devising and implementing maintenance programs to preserve and enhance desirable wildlife habitats.

=== Flora ===
There are plant species, both indigenous and imported. Vegetated sand dunes are found along most of the beach's length and provide the major defense against storm events in the region. Native plant species found on the dunes include sea oats, Sabal palmetto, sea grape, railroad vine, dollar weed, coral bean, Spanish bayonet, wax myrtle, yaupon holly, and several grass species. More salt-tolerant and wind-tolerant species, such as sea oats and railroad vine, are found predominantly on the ocean side of the dune, while other dune vegetation species do not generally show such zonation. These plants assist in building the dune by trapping windblown sand and in stabilizing the dune with extensive lateral root systems.

=== Geology ===
There are approximately 10 acres (4.0 ha) of coquina rock outcrops frequently exposed along the low-tide line of Indian Harbour's ocean beach. The National Marine Fisheries Service has classified the rock as an Essential Fish Habitat-Habitat Area of Particular Concern. It is important to aquatic life and found only in a few locations along the Eastern seaboard.

Fossilized Atlantic ghost crabs can be found on the Indian Harbour's ocean beach, the remnants of a unique set of geological circumstances which preserved these creatures when they died in their burrows perhaps about 110,000 years ago.

There are significant deposits of sand, marl, coquina and possibly phosphate within the limits of Indian Harbour Beach.

=== Surrounding areas ===
- Merritt Island; Indian River Lagoon; Banana River; Melbourne
- Atlantic Ocean
- Melbourne
- Satellite Beach

=== Climate ===
Indian Harbour Beach is located in the region where the climate is Humid subtropical climate. Daytime temperatures average 90 °F (32 °C) in the summer months and 72 °F (22 °C) in the winter months. A study commissioned by NASA lends credence to the notion that Indian Harbour Beach is located in a portion of the North American Atlantic shoreline with a uniquely reduced incidence of catastrophic hurricanes.

Climate data for Indian Harbour Beach, FL
Month	Jan	Feb	Mar	Apr	May	Jun	Jul	Aug	Sep	Oct	Nov	Dec	Year
Record high °F (°C)	89 (32)	91 (33)	93 (34)	97 (36)	99 (37)	101 (38)	102 (39)	101 (38)	98 (37)	96 (36)	91 (33)	93 (34)	102 (39)
Mean daily maximum °F (°C)	71 (22)	74 (23)	77 (25)	81 (27)	86 (30)	89 (32)	91 (33)	91 (33)	88 (31)	84 (29)	79 (26)	73 (23)	82 (28)
Daily mean °F (°C)	60 (16)	63 (17)	66 (19)	71 (22)	77 (25)	81 (27)	82 (28)	82 (28)	81 (27)	76 (24)	70 (21)	63 (17)	73 (23)
Mean daily minimum °F (°C)	49 (9)	52 (11)	55 (13)	60 (16)	67 (19)	72 (22)	73 (23)	73 (23)	73 (23)	68 (20)	60 (16)	53 (12)	63 (17)
Record low °F (°C)	17 (−8)	27 (−3)	25 (−4)	35 (2)	47 (8)	55 (13)	60 (16)	60 (16)	57 (14)	41 (5)	30 (−1)	21 (−6)	17 (−8)
Average precipitation inches (mm)	2.27 (58)	2.63 (67)	3.28 (83)	2.13 (54)	3.29 (84)	6.71 (170)	5.96 (151)	7.68 (195)	7.64 (194)	5.06 (129)	2.88 (73)	2.57 (65)	52.10 (1,323)

== Demographics ==
Historical population
Census	Pop.	Note	%±
1970	5,371		—
1980	5,967		11.1%
1990	6,933		16.2%
2000	8,152		17.6%
2010	8,225		0.9%
2020	9,019		9.7%
U.S. Decennial Census

=== Racial and ethnic composition ===
Indian Harbour Beach racial composition (Hispanics excluded from racial categories) (NH = Non-Hispanic)
Race	Pop 2010	Pop 2020	% 2010	% 2020
White (NH)	7,463	7,680	90.74%	85.15%
Black or African American (NH)	66	85	0.80%	0.94%
Native American or Alaska Native (NH)	16	28	0.19%	0.31%
Asian (NH)	132	185	1.60%	2.05%
Pacific Islander or Native Hawaiian (NH)	3	6	0.04%	0.07%
Some other race (NH)	24	27	0.29%	0.30%
Two or more races/Multiracial (NH)	126	407	1.53%	4.51%
Hispanic or Latino (any race)	395	601	4.80%	6.66%
Total	8,225	9,019		

=== 2020 census ===
As of the 2020 census, Indian Harbour Beach had a population of 9,019. The median age was 52.2 years. 16.1% of residents were under the age of 18 and 28.6% of residents were 65 years of age or older. For every 100 females there were 92.8 males, and for every 100 females age 18 and over there were 92.0 males age 18 and over.

100.0% of residents lived in urban areas, while 0.0% lived in rural areas.

There were 4,077 households in Indian Harbour Beach, of which 22.2% had children under the age of 18 living in them. Of all households, 47.0% were married-couple households, 18.9% were households with a male householder and no spouse or partner present, and 28.3% were households with a female householder and no spouse or partner present. About 31.6% of all households were made up of individuals and 16.6% had someone living alone who was 65 years of age or older.

There were 4,918 housing units, of which 17.1% were vacant. The homeowner vacancy rate was 1.7% and the rental vacancy rate was 13.2%. In 2020, there were 2,337 families residing in the city.

=== 2010 census ===
As of the 2010 United States census, there were 8,225 people, 3,877 households, and 2,181 families residing in the city.

=== 2000 census ===
As of the census of 2000, there were 8,152 people, 3,762 households, and 2,381 families residing in the city. The population density was 1,470.8/km^{2} (3,809/mi^{2}). There were 4,315 housing units at an average density of 778.5 units/km^{2} (2,016 units/mi^{2}). The racial makeup of the city was 95.40% White, 0.93% African American, 0.28% Native American, 1.57% Asian, 0.04% Pacific Islander, 0.55% from other races, and 1.23% from two or more races. Hispanic or Latino of any race were 3.28% of the population.

In 2000, there were 3,762 households, out of which 21.9% had children under the age of 18 living with them, 50.8% were married couples living together, 9.5% had a female householder with no husband present, and 36.7% were non-families. 30.6% of all households were made up of individuals, and 15.0% had someone living alone who was 65 years of age or older. The average household size was 2.17 and the average family size was 2.69.

In 2000, the population was distributed by age with 18.5% under the age of 18, 5.4% from 18 to 24, 23.6% from 25 to 44, 27.5% from 45 to 64, and 24.9% who were 65 years of age or older. The median age was 46 years. For every 100 females, there were 90.1 males. For every 100 females age 18 and over, there were 87.0 males.

In 2000, the median income for a household in the city was $42,889, and the median income for a family was $56,803. Males had a median income of $50,045 versus $29,697 for females. The per capita income for the city was $29,986. About 2.3% of families and 5.5% of the population were below the poverty line, including 4.3% of those under age 18 and 2.2% of those age 65 or over.

== Government ==
The city has a council-manager form of government.

In 2007, the city had a taxable real estate base of $920.7 million.

== Education ==
All of the public schools are served by Brevard Public Schools.

- Public schools:
  - Ocean Breeze Elementary (The only public school within the city limits. In 2009, it scored 11th in the state on the FCAT test.)
  - DeLaura Middle School (located in Satellite Beach)
  - Satellite High School (located in Satellite Beach)
- Private schools:
  - Indian Harbour Montessori
  - Indian Harbour Kindercare

In 2010, the town had the highest percentage of people with undergraduate degrees of any municipality measured in the county, 41%, compared with an average of 26% countywide.

== Recreation ==
There are parks, recreational facilities and natural landscapes as well as Anchorage Yacht Basin.

The Indian Harbour Beach Recreation Center is located in 27 acres (11 ha) Gleason Park on the corner of South Patrick Drive and Yacht Club Boulevard. The Recreation Department offers a wide variety of classes, services and activities, ranging from those for toddlers and preschoolers, to a Senior Leisure-time Club. Also located in the park is the city's heated competition-size swimming pool—open seven days a week year-round, shuffleboard courts, two playgrounds, a walking/exercise trail and picnic facilities.

The million-dollar Algonquin Sports Complex located off Wimico Drive is home to senior baseball, major Little League, softball and soccer fields serving multiple age groups. Other city ball fields are located next to Ocean Breeze School and serve minor Little League teams as well as T-ball participants. Some of the special activities offered through our Recreation Department include the annual Art & Crafts Show held the third Saturday in November, the annual Breakfast With The Easter Bunny, and numerous pool activities including American Red Cross instructed summer swim lessons.

There is a private tennis club and a private yacht club.

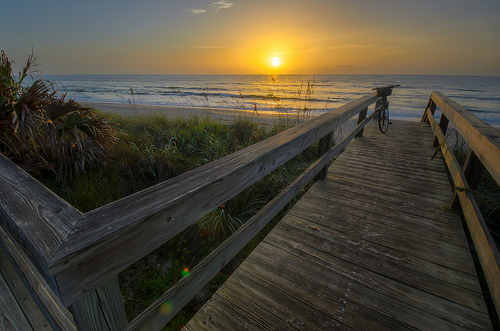
Sunrise at Indian Harbour Beach Park

== Public safety ==
The National Weather Service has named Indian Harbour Beach the first "tsunami-ready" city in Florida.

The city has a 100% Volunteer Fire Department, consisting of 30+ members and utilizing three Class-A pumpers, including a 75-foot ladder truck.

== Infrastructure ==
=== Roads ===
Travelocity.com named State Route A1A as the "Best Driving Route" in Florida. This runs close to the ocean. A secondary major route, paralleling it, is South Patrick Drive, which is close to the Banana River.

The Florida Department of Transportation maintains SR A1A, SR 513, and SR 518. See State Roads in Florida for explanation of numbering system.

- SR A1A – This is the main route through Indian Harbour Beach, leading from Melbourne and Satellite Beach. The stretch of Highway A1A running through this area was renamed Jimmy Buffett Memorial Highway in 2024, shortly after his death in 2023 Major intersections include SR 518 and Pine Tree Drive.
- CR 3 – A small portion of CR 3 runs through Indian Harbour Beach, from Mathers Bridge to SR 513.
- SR 513 – This is a parallel state route of SR A1A, known locally as Patrick Drive. Major intersections include SR 518, CR 3/Banana River Drive, and Cassia Boulevard.
- SR 518 – Known locally as Eau Gallie Boulevard, this road leads from the Eau Gallie Causeway to SR A1A, where SR 518 ends. Major intersections include SR 513/Riverside Drive and SR A1A.

== Notable people ==
- Larry Guarino, spent 8 years as a POW in the Hanoi Hilton during the Vietnam War
- Mike Haridopolos, American politician
- Deborah Jin, American applied physicist
- Jim Rathmann, 1960 Indianapolis 500 winner
- Tim Wakefield, Major League Baseball player
