= Melbourne Beach Pier =

- U.S. National Register of Historic Places
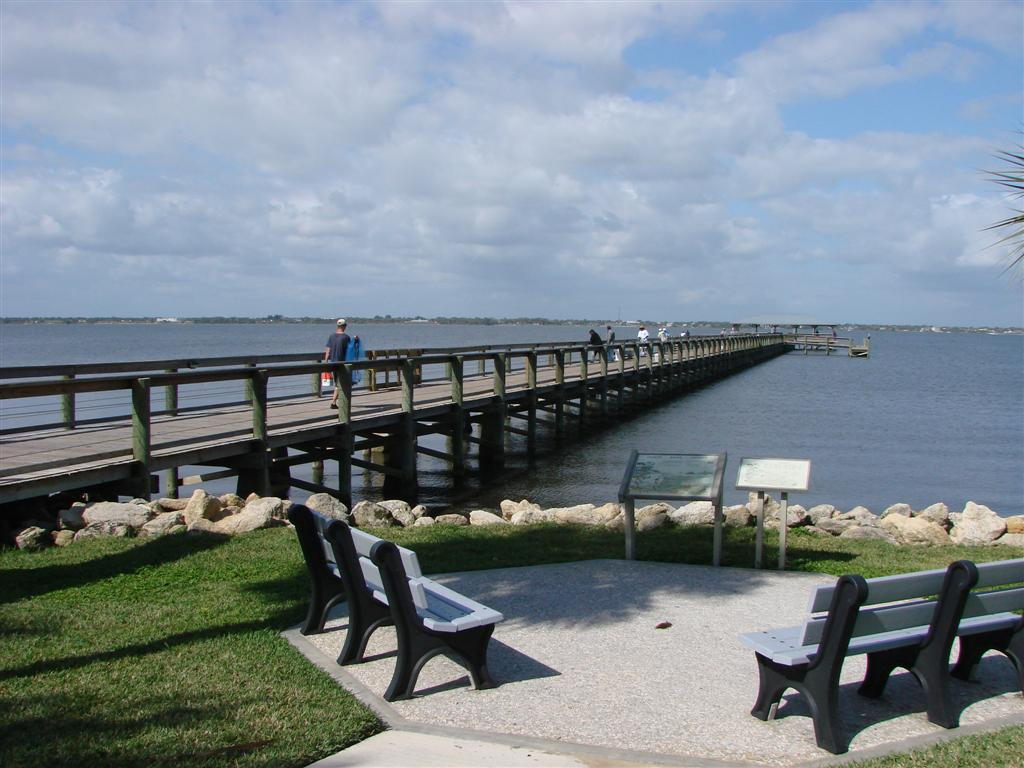

- Location within Florida Location within the United States
- Location: Melbourne Beach, Florida
- Coordinates: 28°4′5″N 80°34′5″W
- NRHP reference No.: 84000829
- Added to NRHP: April 12, 1984

The Melbourne Beach Pier is a historic pier in Melbourne Beach, Florida, United States. It is located at Ocean Avenue and Riverside Drive and the pier extends onto the Indian River. The Melbourne and Atlantic Railroad Company built the pier in 1889. On April 12, 1984, it was added to the U.S. National Register of Historic Places.
