= Suntree, Florida =

Unincorporated community in Florida, U.S.

Suntree is an unincorporated community in Brevard County, Florida, United States. It is located near the center of the county, off I-95 near Viera between Interstate 95 and the Florida East Coast Railroad. It lies approximately halfway between Rockledge and Melbourne.

Suntree is part of the Palm Bay–Melbourne–Titusville Metropolitan Statistical Area.

== Geography ==
Suntree is located at 28°13′46″N 80°54′05″W While it is located north of Melbourne, it uses a Melbourne, Florida postal address.

== Rare snowfall ==
On January 9, 2010, a storm during a cold snap brought mostly rain, but it later changed into sleet and then to snow. The snow was light, and there was no accumulation.

== Media ==
- Viera Voice is the monthly local newspaper that serves Suntree and Rockledge/Viera.
- The Sun also a bi-weekly newspaper, serves Suntree and the surrounding areas, including Palm Shores.
- Hometown News is the bi-weekly local newspaper that serves Suntree/Viera.

== Notable residents ==
- Major General Frederick C. Blesse, the sixth ranking fighter pilot of all time. Lived in Country Walk.
- Cecil Fielder and Prince Fielder 1998-2000. Father and son professional baseball players. They lived in a mansion on Jordan Blass Drive.
- Richie Lewis, a retired Major League Baseball player, currently resides here with his family.
