= Horti Point =

- Headland
- Interactive map of Horti Point
- Coordinates: 28°19′20″N 80°39′36″W
- Country: United States
- State: Florida
- County: Brevard
- Elevation: 0 ft (0 m)
- ZIP code: 32952
- Area code: 321

Horti Point is a headland on Merritt Island in Brevard County, Florida.
