= Eau Gallie Causeway =

Bridge in Florida, United States of America

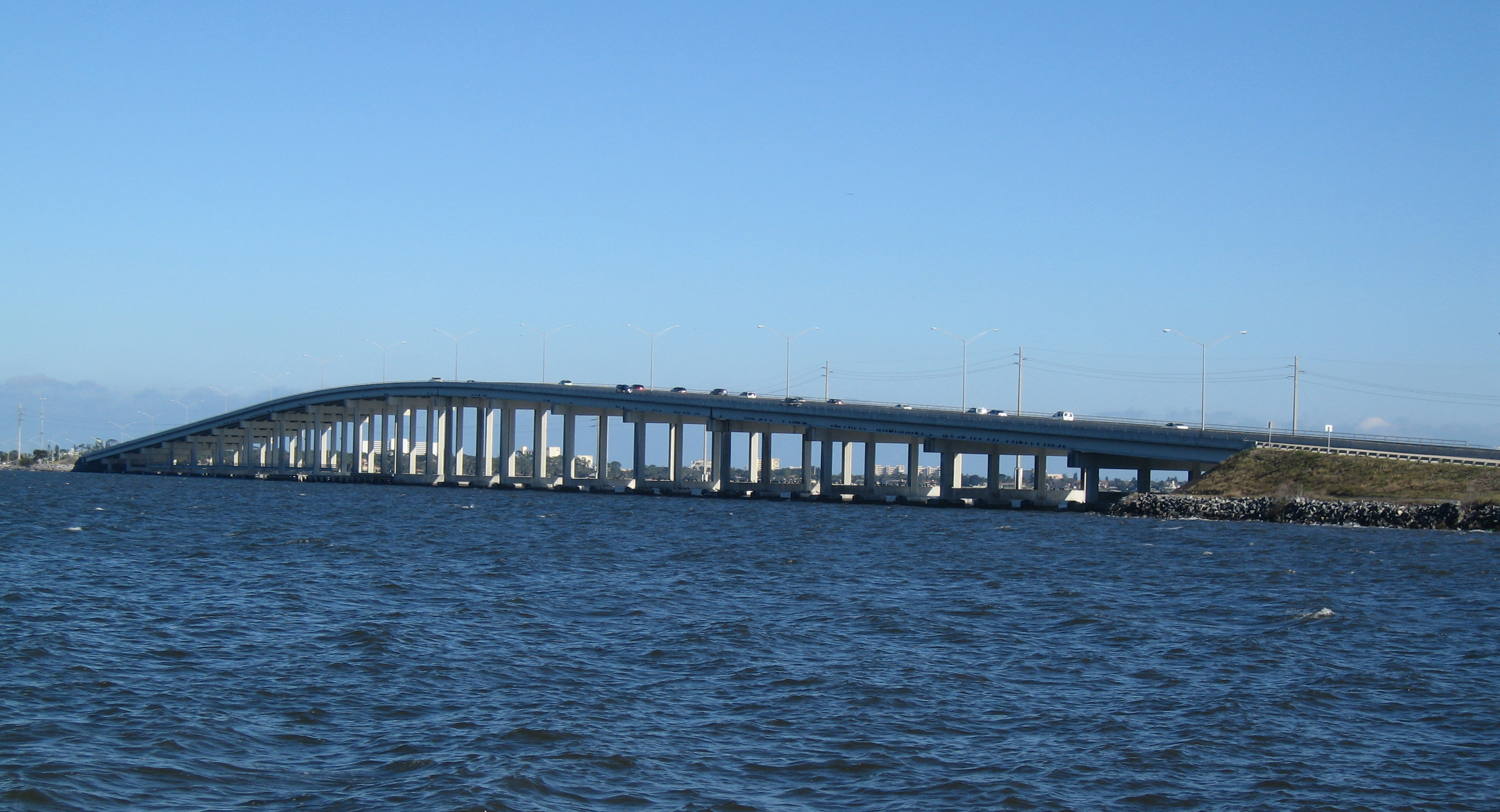
- Eau Gallie Causeway
- Coordinates: 28°07′58″N 80°37′05″W
- Carries: SR 518
- Crosses: Indian River
- Locale: Eau Gallie & Indian Harbour Beach

Characteristics
- No. of lanes: 4 lanes

History
- Construction end: 1988

Location
- Interactive map of Eau Gallie Causeway

The Eau Gallie Causeway connects Eau Gallie, Florida (which merged with Melbourne in 1969), with SR A1A near Indian Harbour Beach, across the Indian River Lagoon. Located entirely within the Melbourne city limits, the causeway consists of a main bridge crossing over the Intracoastal Waterway and a relief bridge. The bridge is a key link in SR 518, Eau Gallie Boulevard, of which the causeway is a part.

== History ==
In 1925, construction began on the first wooden bridge across the Indian River Lagoon. On February 22, 1926, George Washington's Birthday, the bridge opened to traffic. The bridge connected to a sand trail that led to Canova Beach. At this time, there was no railing on the bridge for a year after its construction. There are no records that anyone fell off the bridge during this time. In 1944 a 200 feet (61 m) section of the bridge burned.

On February 22, 1955, George Washington's Birthday, a new multimillion-dollar concrete bridge was dedicated to Dr. William Jackson Creel. The second Eau Gallie Causeway featured a swing span drawbridge.

The third bridge, a high-rise causeway, was completed in 1988.

Just north of the bridge, the Indian River Lagoon splits to form the Banana River Lagoon east of the southern tip of Merritt Island, Florida. Its southern tip has been known locally as Dragon's Point since 1971 when a green dragon was built there. However, in 2002 most of the dragon collapsed into the river and was nearly destroyed.

From 1945 until 1971, State Road 3 extended from Merritt Island to Melbourne over both Mathers Bridge and the Eau Gallie Causeway; after the opening of the Pineda Causeway, SR 3 was removed from the Eau Gallie Causeway, and State Road 518 has been crossing the Intracoastal Waterway over it (and connecting with Interstate 95) since then.
