= Palm Shores, Florida =

Town in the state of Florida, United States

- Town
- Town of Palm Shores
- Seal
- Motto: "The Little Town That Cares"
- Location in Brevard County and the state of Florida
- Coordinates: 28°11′27″N 80°39′34″W
- Country: United States
- State: Florida
- County: Brevard
- Incorporated: 1959

Government
  - Type: Mayor-Council
  - Mayor: Charles "Chase" Chambliss
  - Vice Mayor: Sharon Secord
  - Councilors: Frank Falcone, Barbara Mathewson, and Paul Bonville
  - Town Clerk and Town Manager: Patricia J. Burke
  - Town Attorney: Karl Bohne

Area
  - Total: 0.60 sq mi (1.56 km^{2})
  - Land: 0.60 sq mi (1.56 km^{2})
  - Water: 0 sq mi (0.00 km^{2})
- Elevation: 23 ft (7.0 m)

Population (2020)
  - Total: 1,200
  - Density: 1,998.5/sq mi (771.61/km^{2})
- Time zone: UTC-5 (Eastern (EST))
  - Summer (DST): UTC-4 (EDT)
- ZIP codes: 32935, 32940
- Area code: 321
- FIPS code: 12-54425
- GNIS feature ID: 2407069
- Website: www.TownOfPalmShores.org

Palm Shores is a town in Brevard County, Florida. It is part of the Palm Bay–Melbourne–Titusville, Florida Metropolitan Statistical Area. The population was 1,200 at the 2020 US Census, up from 900 at the 2010 census.

== Geography ==
According to the United States Census Bureau, the town has a total area of 0.5 square miles (1.3 km^{2}), all land.

=== Climate ===
The climate in this area is characterized by hot, humid summers and generally mild winters. According to the Köppen climate classification, the Town of Palm Shores has a humid subtropical climate zone (Cfa).

== Demographics ==
Historical population
Census	Pop.	Note	%±
1970	202		—
1980	77		−61.9%
1990	210		172.7%
2000	794		278.1%
2010	900		13.4%
2020	1,200		33.3%
U.S. Decennial Census

=== Racial and ethnic composition ===
Palm Shores racial composition (Hispanics excluded from racial categories) (NH = Non-Hispanic)
Race	Pop 2010	Pop 2020	% 2010	% 2020
White (NH)	719	891	79.89%	74.25%
Black or African American (NH)	60	53	6.67%	4.42%
Native American or Alaska Native (NH)	0	2	0.00%	0.17%
Asian (NH)	25	45	2.78%	3.75%
Pacific Islander or Native Hawaiian (NH)	1	2	0.11%	0.17%
Some other race (NH)	0	9	0.00%	0.75%
Two or more races/Multiracial (NH)	30	71	3.33%	5.92%
Hispanic or Latino (any race)	65	127	7.22%	10.58%
Total	900	1,200		

=== 2020 census ===
As of the 2020 census, Palm Shores had a population of 1,200. The median age was 47.4 years. 17.5% of residents were under the age of 18 and 19.8% of residents were 65 years of age or older. For every 100 females there were 97.0 males, and for every 100 females age 18 and over there were 94.5 males age 18 and over.

100.0% of residents lived in urban areas, while 0.0% lived in rural areas.

There were 488 households in Palm Shores, of which 32.0% had children under the age of 18 living in them. Of all households, 57.8% were married-couple households, 15.8% were households with a male householder and no spouse or partner present, and 20.1% were households with a female householder and no spouse or partner present. About 20.5% of all households were made up of individuals and 10.1% had someone living alone who was 65 years of age or older.

There were 524 housing units, of which 6.9% were vacant. The homeowner vacancy rate was 0.7% and the rental vacancy rate was 5.0%.

According to the 2020 American Community Survey 5-year estimates, there were 422 families residing in the town.

=== 2010 census ===
As of the 2010 census, there were 900 people, 328 households, and 216 families residing in the town.

=== 2000 census ===
At the 2000 census there were 794 people, 328 households, and 224 families in the town. The population density was 1,608.4 inhabitants per square mile (621.0/km^{2}). There were 377 housing units at an average density of 763.7 units per square mile (294.9 units/km^{2}). The racial makeup of the town was 88.04% White, 4.41% African American, 0.50% Native American, 3.27% Asian, 0.50% Pacific Islander, 1.01% from other races, and 2.27% from two or more races. Hispanic or Latino of any race were 4.28%.

Of the 328 households in 2000, 29.0% had children under the age of 18 living with them, 59.8% were married couples living together, 6.4% had a female householder with no husband present, and 31.7% were non-families. 26.5% of households were one person and 10.1% were one person aged 65 or older. The average household size was 2.42 and the average family size was 2.96.

In 2000, the age distribution was 22.0% under the age of 18, 5.4% from 18 to 24, 26.7% from 25 to 44, 29.7% from 45 to 64, and 16.1% 65 or older. The median age was 43 years. For every 100 females, there were 98.5 males. For every 100 females age 18 and over, there were 98.4 males.

In 2000, the median household income was $47,500 and the median family income was $63,333. Males had a median income of $38,194 versus $26,000 for females. The per capita income for the town was $22,390. About 5.7% of families and 9.3% of the population were below the poverty line, including 12.6% of those under age 18 and 10.0% of those age 65 or over.

== Government ==
In 2007, the town had a taxable real estate base of $64.67 million. It is the only municipality in the county to have its tax base rise in 2008.
