= Florida State Highway System =

Highway system in Florida, United States

State Highway System
- ; ; Standard route markers in Florida

Highway names
- Interstates: Interstate X (I-X)
- US Highways: U.S. Highway X (US X)
- State: State Road X (SR X)

System links
- Florida State Highway System; Interstate; US; State; Former; Pre‑1945; Toll; Scenic

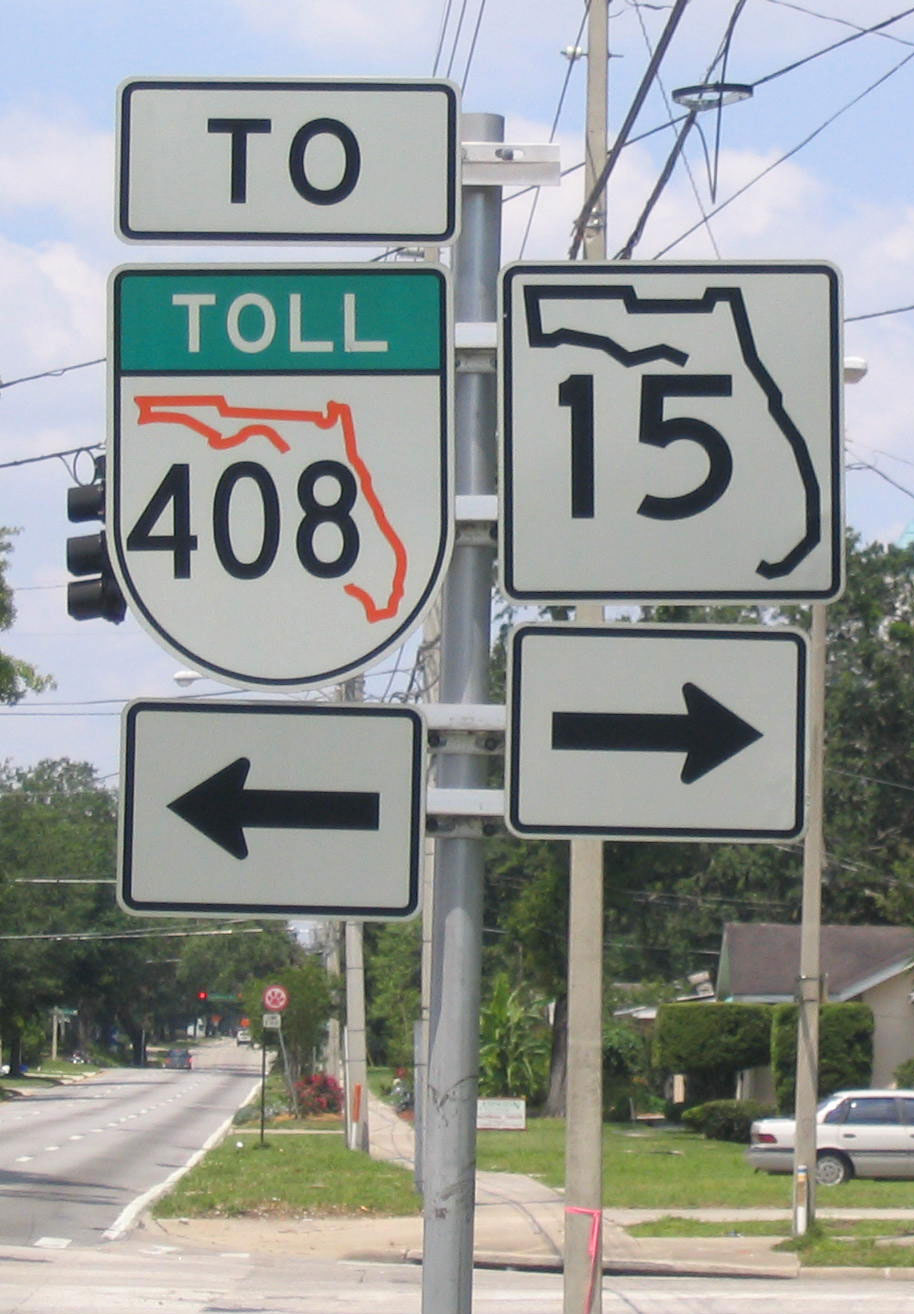
The two kinds of State Road shields used

The State Highway System of the U.S. state of Florida comprises the roads maintained by the Florida Department of Transportation (FDOT) or a toll authority. The components are referred to officially as state roads, abbreviated as SR.

== History ==
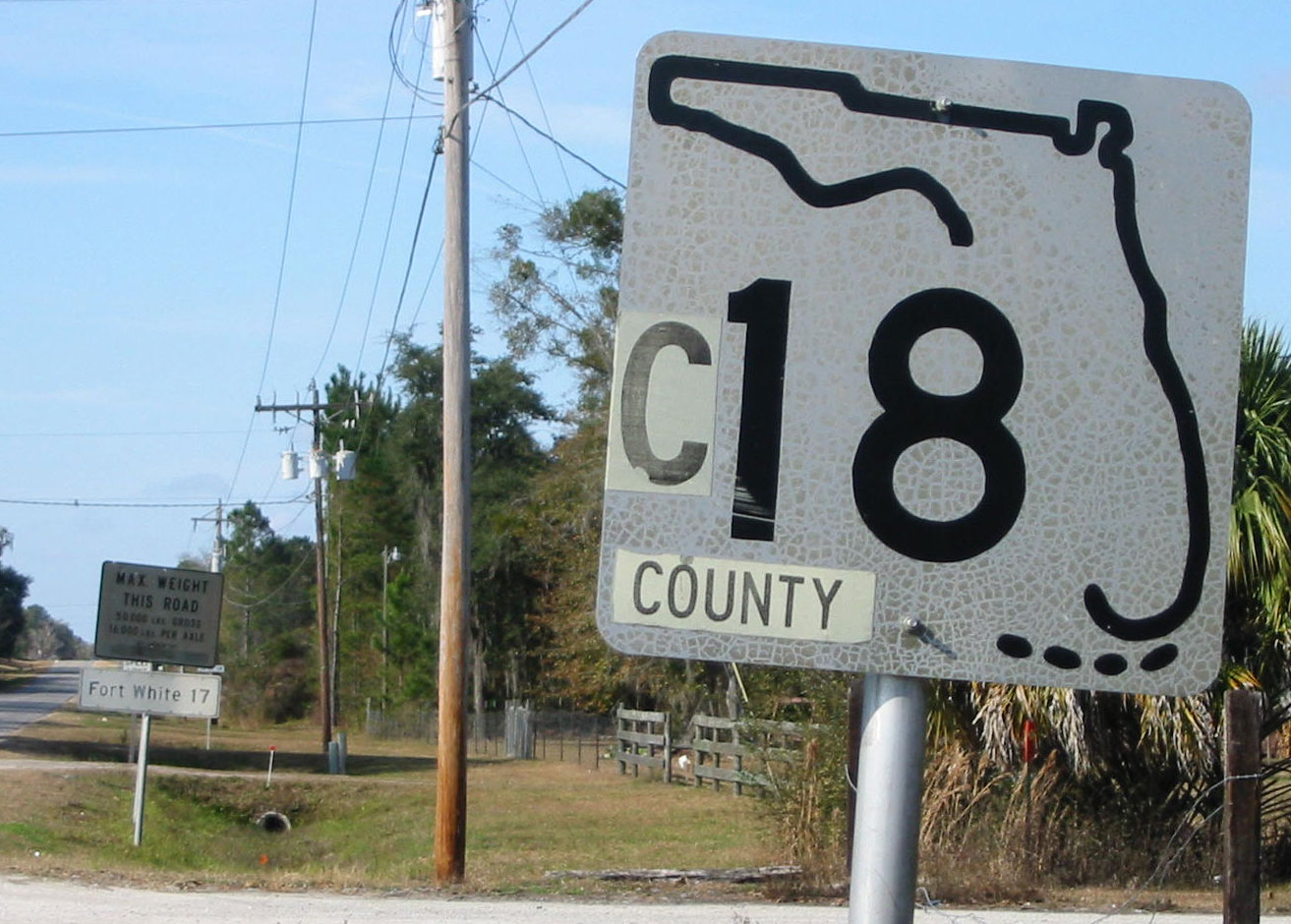
Old State Road 18 shield, modified when the road was given to the county

Prior to the 1945 renumbering, State Roads were given numbers in the order they were added to the system. The 1945 renumbering removed many roads that were never built and added some that had not existed prior to 1945.

In 1955, the State Road Department (SRD) slowed the addition of new state roads and began to classify roads into primary, secondary, and local roads. Primary roads would continue to be state-maintained, while secondary roads would have an S before the number, and would only be state-maintained during a construction project. Local roads would be completely removed from the system. In 1969, the State Road Department was superseded by Florida Department of Transportation (FDOT).

In 1977, House Bill 803 (HB 803), Chapter 77-165 in the Laws of Florida, was passed in the Florida Legislature. This transportation policy act eliminated the secondary roads, roads that consisted of county roads that were maintained by the state. When the provisions went into effect on July 1, 1977, the division of roads became state, county, and local. Most secondary roads and some primary roads were given to the counties, and occasionally a new state road was taken over; some main roads in incorporated areas were given to the localities.

== Numbering system ==
State road numbers are assigned by the Florida Department of Transportation (FDOT). Every state road must have a number. The road segments can be discontinuous (or interrupted), but the separate segments must have a logical and sequential connection between them. A road cannot ever split into two different roads with the same state road or county road number unless it is to allow for a one-way pair to connect to a two-way road. There is also no minimum required length for a state road.

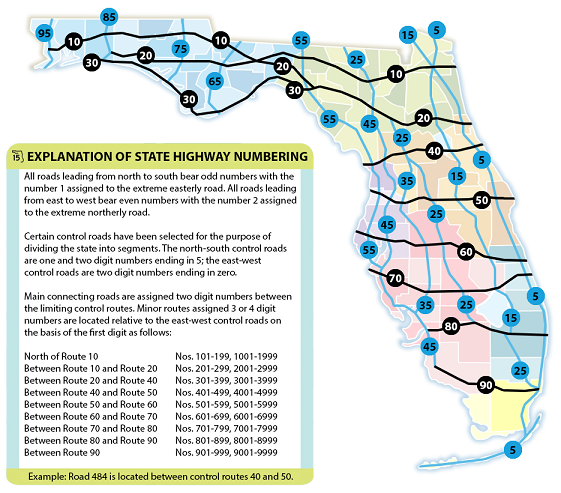
Explanation of State Highway numbering from FDOT. Note the usage of unsigned roads, e.g. SR 45 for US 41, SR 5 for portion of US 1, etc.

Odd-numbered roads run north-south and even-numbered roads run east-west. One- and two-digit numbers run in order from 2 in the north to 94 in the south, and A1A (formerly 1) in the east to 99 in the west. The major cross-state roads end in 0 and 5. Three-digit numbers increase from east to west across the band. 30 is skipped because it runs along the Gulf Coast in the panhandle and doesn't extend across the state. The graphic above shows SR 30 changing to SR 20 going east of the panhandle.

Minor routes assigned three or four-digit numbers are located relative to the east-west control roads on the basis of the first digit. For example, State Road 464 is located between State Road 40 and State Road 50.

Every section of U.S. Highway and Interstate Highway has a State Road number assigned to it, usually unsigned (for example, Interstate 4 is also unsigned SR 400). In addition to some named toll roads (for example, 91 and 821, which make up Florida's Turnpike) some minor State Roads are also unsigned (like SR 913 and SR 5054).

== See also ==
- List of former state roads in Florida
- List of state roads in Florida
- List of toll roads in Florida
