= Malabar Road =

Malabar Road is a major arterial road in Palm Bay and Malabar, Florida. However, the name can refer to two routes:

- Florida State Road 514
- County Road 514 (Brevard County, Florida)
