= John Brennan Crutchley =

American rapist and kidnapper (1946–2002)

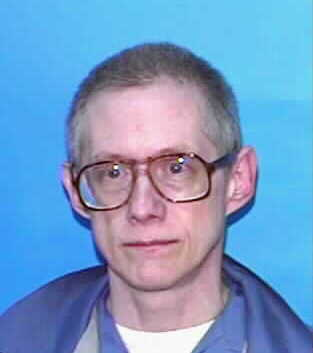
- Crutchley in 1998
- Born: October 1, 1946; Clarksburg, West Virginia, U.S.
- Died: March 30, 2002 (aged 55); Bowling Green, Florida, U.S.
- Other name: The Vampire Rapist
- Occupation: System engineer
- Status: Deceased
- Convictions: Kidnapping; Sexual battery
- Penalty: Life sentence

Details
- Victims: 2–30+
- Span of crimes: January 28, 1978 – November 22, 1985

John Brennan Crutchley (October 1, 1946 – March 30, 2002) was an American convicted kidnapper and rapist. A possible serial killer, he was suspected of murdering up to thirty women. He was called the Vampire Rapist because he drained the blood of his one confirmed victim almost to the point of death.

== Early life and career ==
Crutchley was born the youngest of three children into an affluent family in Clarksburg, West Virginia, on October 1, 1946. His parents were William “Bill” Crutchley Sr. and Mildred Burnside. According to Crutchley, his mother was distraught over the loss of her eldest child, Donna June Crutchley (August 17, 1931 – February 2, 1945). Donna had died during emergency surgery the year before John was born; her cause of death was listed as "circulatory collapse". When Crutchley was born, his mother was disappointed by his sex because she had intended to have another daughter, so she began dressing him as a girl for the first six years of his life. In addition to being forced to wear a dress, Crutchley also claimed his parents subjected him to severe child abuse, which included beating him until he lost consciousness.

Crutchley was a friendless child, preferring to spend most of his time tinkering with electronic gadgets in the basement of his home. This penchant for electronics paid off early when he earned money repairing and rebuilding complex radio and stereo systems. He graduated from Upper St. Clair High School in Upper St. Clair Township, Pennsylvania, earned a Bachelor of Science degree in Physics from Defiance College in Ohio in 1970, and later a Master of Engineering degree in Engineering Administration from George Washington University in Washington, D.C. He married his first wife in 1969.

Crutchley's first marriage showed strains by the time he graduated from college, and it had all but ended by the time he moved to Kokomo, Indiana, to work at Delco Electronics. Crutchley had previously worked at General Motors' Central Foundry Division in Defiance, Ohio, where he was responsible for the installation of a new plant security system. He applied for a transfer to Delco Electronics in Kokomo, where the systems were designed and built, and worked there for several years as an electrical systems engineer.

Crutchley's departure from Kokomo came after an investigation was made by plant security into missing materials. He later moved to Fairfax County, Virginia, and remarried in the mid-1970s. He worked for several high-tech firms in the Washington, D.C. area, including TRW, ICA and Logicon Process Systems. Crutchley later moved to Florida and began working in 1983 at Harris Corporation in Palm Bay. At the time of his arrest, Crutchley was found to be in possession of a great deal of highly classified information regarding naval weaponry and communications. The FBI, CIA and naval intelligence considered opening an espionage case against him although they ultimately never did. Crutchley's employer, Harris Corporation, was highly involved with not only the NASA research and launch facilities at Cape Canaveral, but also with other naval contractors and subcontractors.

== Arrest, discovery and investigation ==
On the evening of November 22, 1985, in Malabar, Florida, a nude woman later identified as 19-year-old Laura Murphy, handcuffed at both feet and ankles, was found crawling along the side of the road. She had been passed by several trucks before a motorist stopped to help her. She begged the motorist to not take her back "to that house"; when he asked where, she told him to remember a certain house. He noted the location, took her home, and called for police and an ambulance.

The hospital determined that the victim was missing between 40 and 45 percent of her blood and had ligature marks on her neck. She had been hitchhiking the day before on November 21 and she claimed that Crutchley had picked her up and was willing to take her to where she needed to go, which was the nearby city of Melbourne, Florida, but said he had to stop off at home first to pick up the notebook he claimed he needed for work. Once in his driveway, Crutchley invited her in but she refused, at which time he tied a ligature around the teenager's neck, choked her into unconsciousness, and dragged her into his house. Then, he removed all of the young woman's clothing and strapped her to the counter in his kitchen. Murphy awoke to find that she was tied to the kitchen countertop, arms and legs immobilized. A video camera had been set up, along with lights, presumably so that he could watch the footage later to relive the attack. Crutchley then raped her and inserted needles into her arm and wrist and carefully extracted blood and began to drink it, telling her that he was a vampire. Afterward, he handcuffed her and put her in the bathtub, returning later for another round of sexual assault and blood extraction.

The following morning, after a third round, Crutchley handcuffed Murphy and left her in the bathroom, saying that he would be back later for further assaults, and that if she tried to escape in the interim, his brother would come and kill her. It was after Crutchley had left the house that she was able to push out of the bathroom window and crawl to the road. A haematologist later stated that she would have died of blood loss within twelve hours if she had not been able to get help. Murphy was initially too traumatised to file charges against Crutchley, but a rape counsellor was eventually able to persuade her to do so by explaining that if Crutchley was found guilty, it would help stop him from being able to harm more victims.

A search warrant was served for Crutchley, whose wife and child were away for the Thanksgiving holiday visiting relatives in Maryland. The videotape in the camera was partially erased, which according to the victim would otherwise have contained footage of her rape and the extraction of her blood. Crutchley was arrested during the search, which took place at 2:30 a.m. Photographs of the house taken at the time of this first search showed, among other things, a stack of credit cards several inches thick. A later search did not turn up these credit cards, nor a collection of women's necklaces and multiple locks of hair concealed in a closet which had been noted, but not confiscated, by the police during the first search.

During the second search in relation to the Malabar case, police discovered a stack of seventy-two index cards on which Crutchley had recorded the names of multiple women and some men along with their described sexual performances. When contacted, some of the partners indicated that he had crossed the line from "kinky" consensual acts into sexual assaults involving restraint. Crutchley's wife had apparently cooperated in similar acts and spoke to the press about him. Among other remarks, she commented on his attack on the handcuffed teen, calling it "a gentle rape, devoid of any overt brutality." When authorities searched Crutchley's office, they found a number of sexually explicit photographs of an unidentified woman tied up and gagged, with Crutchley choking the woman with his hands. They also found homemade sex tapes of Crutchley and his wife, and dozens of photographs of women in public places.

In June 1986, Crutchley pleaded guilty on kidnapping and rape charges in exchange for prosecutors dropping the "grievous bodily harm" charge for extracting the victim's blood and for drug possession. During the sentencing phase, the blood issue came up nonetheless and Crutchley claimed to have been introduced to blood drinking by a nurse as part of a sexual ritual in 1970. Crutchley asked that the blood drinking not be considered in his sentencing because in this case, he had not actually drunk the blood; he claimed that it had coagulated before he could drink it, "and he couldn't get it down". Crutchley's wife did not take the stand, but told reporters that her husband was not guilty and was just "a kinky sort of guy." Based on testimony at the sentencing hearing, the judge chose to exceed state guidelines and sentenced Crutchley to twenty-five years to life in prison with fifty years of subsequent parole.

== Suspected victims ==
After being contacted by local authorities for his input, FBI profiler Robert Ressler was convinced that Crutchley had almost certainly killed before, identifying him as a "serial killer of the organized type". Ressler instigated the second search, which was of much wider scope and detail than the first. He noted that several female bodies had been found in Brevard County in previous years, and that other bodies had been found and women had been reported missing in Pennsylvania while Crutchley had lived there. No evidence was found to link these deaths to Crutchley, however. Authorities believe he may have killed women in Virginia, Maryland, Ohio, Washington, D.C., and Brevard County, Florida.

- On January 28, 1978, Deborah Rita Fitzjohn, a 25-year-old secretary from Fairfax, Virginia, disappeared. Crutchley was placed under close scrutiny because he was Fitzjohn's boyfriend and she was last seen alive at the trailer park where he lived at Waple's Mobile Home Estates. As a result, he was questioned several times for his possible involvement in her disappearance. Crutchley claimed that Deborah had visited him the night before she vanished, but he fell asleep in front of the television. He said that she had left when he awoke. Fitzjohn's skeletal remains were found by a hunter in October the following year. When Crutchley was arrested in November 1985, investigators said they found the business card of the chief investigator in the Fitzjohn case among Crutchley's possessions.
- 29-year-old Patti Lou Volansky was last seen by her roommate between 4:30 and 5:30 p.m. on March 15, 1985, when Volansky decided to hitchhike, and left their Mims, Florida residence on foot. She has not been seen since. Crutchley is considered a suspect in Volansky's case. At his workplace, Volansky's photo ID card was discovered, and he acknowledged that he had picked her up hitchhiking about six months before his arrest in November 1985. Crutchley claimed that he ordered Volansky out of his car after she started making "obnoxious" demands. The following day, he found her identification on the seat of his vehicle and took them to his office. Her body has not been found.
- In addition to Volansky, the identification cards of five other women were found by police in Crutchley's work desk. One of them belonged to Nancy Kay Brown, a 25-year-old native of Rantoul, Illinois, who disappeared while vacationing in Cocoa Beach, Florida, on June 6, 1983. Her remains were discovered in Canaveral Groves on March 8, 1984. She died from a blow to the head. On May 1, 1984, boaters found the body of a female floating in a creek north of the Barge Canal on Merritt Island. She was later identified as 16-year-old Cheryl Ann Windsor, who had been reported missing by her mother on April 7, 1984, and whose identification was found along with those belonging to 20-year-old Diana Lee Casey whose skeletal remains were also found on Merritt Island in 1984.
- Twenty-three bone fragments, believed to be the partial remains of two women, were found in dense brush south of U.S. Route 1 in Malabar, Florida on January 30, 1985. Some of the bones were identified as the remains of Kimberly Ann Walker, 21, of Vero Beach, Florida. Bones from the pelvis, leg and foot belong to Jeanette Marcotte, resident of Saskatchewan, Canada was found too. In both cases, the exact cause of death was unknown. Walker was last seen in June 1984 getting into a light-colored, small car at a Micco convenience store. Crutchley owned a beige 1982 Nissan Stanza. The decomposing and bludgeoned body of Lynn Kay Desantis, 40, was found in a ditch in Grant, Florida on November 26, 1985. She was last seen hitchhiking outside the Colonial Motel where she resided in Melbourne, Florida. Her death was ruled a homicide.
- In 1995, Naval Criminal Investigative Service agents began investigating Crutchley, who had access to the Norfolk Naval Air Station during the time two women were murdered at the base. Pamela Anne Kimbrue, a 23-year-old Navy messenger, disappeared from the base on March 25, 1982. Later, at the end of a seaplane ramp, her body was discovered floating in her submerged vehicle. Her assailant attempted to choke her while tying her arms behind her with clothesline. However, Richard Whittle was later identified as a suspect, and he plead guilty to Kimbrue's rape and murder. Carol Ann Molnar, a 21-year-old Navy clerk, disappeared on February 6, 1983. Three months later, at the Norfolk base, her decomposing body was discovered partially buried beneath rocks of a sea wall. She had been choked to death. Following their investigation, a man was sentenced in 1997 to two life terms in prison for the slaying of Kimbrue. Molnar's murder has not been solved.
- In 2010, the Brevard County Sheriff's Office released an image of a skull reconstruction based on the remains of an unidentified woman known only as the Brevard County Doe. Teen hunters found the decedent's remains in a densely wooded area off of Hollywood Boulevard in West Melbourne, Florida, on December 15, 1985, not far from Crutchley's home.

== Incarceration and death ==
Writing about the case in 1992, Ressler predicted that Crutchley's "25 to life" sentence would result in release as soon as 1998. In fact, Crutchley was released two years earlier than that. After serving eleven years of his sentence, Crutchley was released on August 8, 1996, from Union Correctional Institution in Raiford for good behavior. Officials in Bridgeport, West Virginia, where his mother lived, did not want him, nor did authorities in Malabar and Melbourne. Therefore, Crutchley was transferred to the Orlando Probation and Restitution Center, a halfway house. Less than a day later, Crutchley was arrested for violating his parole after testing positive for marijuana. Even though he denied smoking marijuana saying that inmates blew marijuana smoke in his face, prosecutors in the subsequent trial showed him confessing to a corrections inspector that he smoked the substance because he was nervous about his impending release and he was aware of the relaxing effects of cannabis.

This violation of his parole resulted in a sentence of life imprisonment to be imposed on January 31, 1997, under the "three strikes law". This was his third conviction; the first two were for the kidnapping and the rape of the Malabar hitchhiker. Crutchley was placed in solitary confinement when it was discovered that he had thirteen body piercings on his genitals, which was in violation of prison rules.

=== Death ===
On March 30, 2002, Crutchley died in prison. Corrections officials reported on April 2, 2002, that he had been found dead in his cell at the Hardee Correctional Institute with a plastic bag over his head. The cause of death reported was asphyxiation. Subsequent reporting around August 1, 2003, from the Florida Department of Corrections declared that Crutchley died of autoerotic asphyxiation.

== Media coverage ==
On October 30, 2010, the cable channel Investigation Discovery broadcast a twenty-minute summary of the Brevard County incident which led to Crutchley's incarceration. This episode of American Occult includes interviews with "vampirism sociologist" Katherine Ramsland, as well as Brevard County investigators. This episode also included archival video footage of Crutchley, including his declaration that the attribution of vampirism is pointless, declaring that "it's all about the label of the 'big V', the 'big V' is empty, that's not me". Ramsland noted of Crutchley that there was nothing about him which would send danger signals to potential victims, indeed, she states that there was "nothing about him that would indicate he was anything but an engineer".
