= West Melbourne =

West Melbourne may refer to:

- West Melbourne, Florida, United States
- West Melbourne, Victoria, Australia
