= Micco, Florida =

Micco, Florida Chipco
- Census-designated place
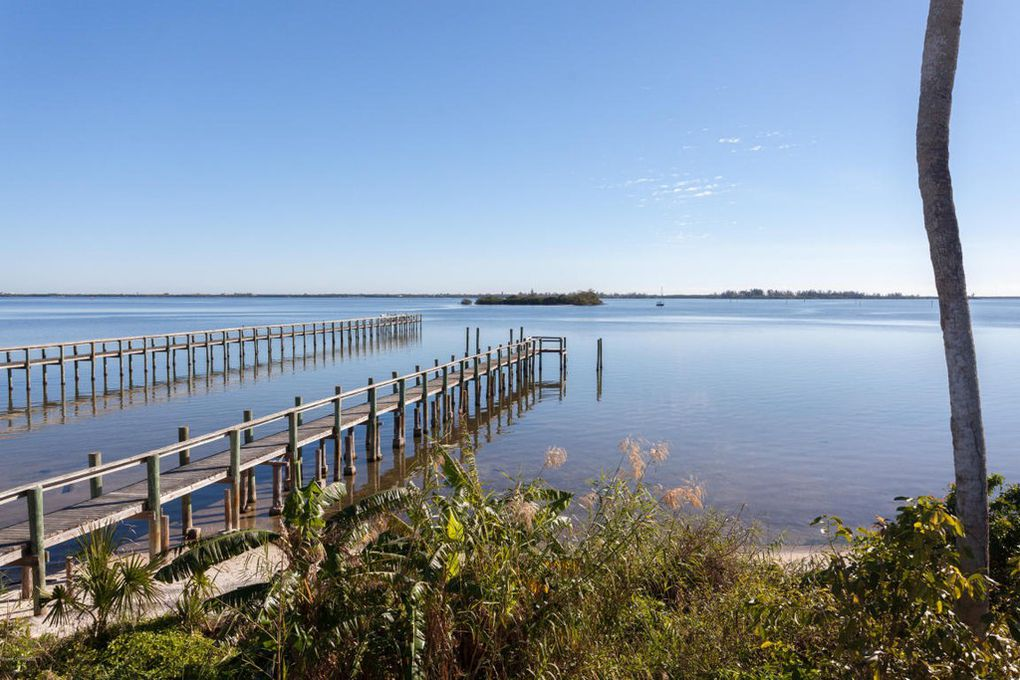
- Two piers on the Indian River, Micco, Florida

- Location in Brevard County and the state of Florida
- Coordinates: 27°52′15″N 80°30′32″W
- Country: United States
- State: Florida
- County: Brevard
- Settled: 1877
- First settler: Frank Smith

Area
  - Total: 9.85 sq mi (25.52 km^{2})
  - Land: 7.60 sq mi (19.69 km^{2})
  - Water: 2.25 sq mi (5.83 km^{2})
- Elevation: 20 ft (6.1 m)

Population (2020)
  - Total: 9,574
  - Density: 1,259.1/sq mi (486.15/km^{2})
- Time zone: UTC-5 (Eastern (EST))
  - Summer (DST): UTC-4 (EDT)
- ZIP code: 32976
- Area code: 772
- FIPS code: 12-45275
- GNIS feature ID: 2403283

Micco is a census-designated place (CDP) in Brevard County, Florida. The population was 9,574 at the 2020 United States census, up from 9,052 at the 2010 United States census. It is part of the Palm Bay–Melbourne–Titusville, Florida Metropolitan Statistical Area.

== History ==
Frank Smith was the first settler in 1877. In 1880, a post office was established under the name Chipco, however it was discontinued after only a year. It was re-established under the name Micco in 1884. In 1993, the post office was merged with the Sebastian post office. They are in two separate buildings next to one another, but one is merely a counterpart of the other.

== Geography ==
According to the United States Census Bureau, the CDP has a total area of 9.9 square miles (25.6 km^{2}), of which 7.6 square miles (19.7 km^{2}) is land and 2.2 square miles (5.8 km^{2}), or 22.78%, is water.

Micco shares its zip code with Sebastian.

=== Surrounding areas ===
- Grant-Valkaria
- Deer Run
- Indian River Lagoon
- Indian River County

== Demographics ==
Historical population
Census	Pop.	Note	%±
1990	8,757		—
2000	9,498		8.5%
2010	9,052		−4.7%
2020	9,574		5.8%
U.S. Decennial Census

=== 2020 census ===
As of the 2020 census, Micco had a population of 9,574. The median age was 68.1 years. 5.0% of residents were under the age of 18 and 58.9% of residents were 65 years of age or older. For every 100 females there were 89.1 males, and for every 100 females age 18 and over there were 88.5 males age 18 and over.

96.7% of residents lived in urban areas, while 3.3% lived in rural areas.

There were 5,426 households in Micco, of which 5.5% had children under the age of 18 living in them. Of all households, 42.5% were married-couple households, 20.5% were households with a male householder and no spouse or partner present, and 31.0% were households with a female householder and no spouse or partner present. About 39.5% of all households were made up of individuals and 28.9% had someone living alone who was 65 years of age or older.

There were 6,700 housing units, of which 19.0% were vacant. The homeowner vacancy rate was 2.3% and the rental vacancy rate was 11.6%.

Racial composition as of the 2020 census
Race	Number	Percent
White	8,998	94.0%
Black or African American	65	0.7%
American Indian and Alaska Native	21	0.2%
Asian	31	0.3%
Native Hawaiian and Other Pacific Islander	2	0.0%
Some other race	85	0.9%
Two or more races	372	3.9%
Hispanic or Latino (of any race)	253	2.6%

=== 2000 census ===
As of the 2000 census, there were 9,498 people, 5,212 households, and 3,163 families residing in the CDP. The population density was 1,009.9 inhabitants per square mile (389.9/km^{2}). There were 6,400 housing units at an average density of 680.5 per square mile (262.7/km^{2}). The racial makeup of the CDP was 98.82% White, 0.24% African American, 0.15% Native American, 0.09% Asian, 0.13% Pacific Islander, 0.18% from other races, and 0.39% from two or more races. Hispanic or Latino of any race were 1.32% of the population.

There were 5,212 households, out of which 5.2% had children under the age of 18 living with them, 54.6% were married couples living together, 4.2% had a female householder with no husband present, and 39.3% were non-families. 34.4% of all households were made up of individuals, and 26.1% had someone living alone who was 65 years of age or older. The average household size was 1.82 and the average family size was 2.23.

In the CDP, the population was spread out, with 5.9% under the age of 18, 2.0% from 18 to 24, 9.3% from 25 to 44, 24.2% from 45 to 64, and 58.6% who were 65 years of age or older. The median age was 69 years. For every 100 females, there were 87.4 males. For every 100 females age 18 and over, there were 86.7 males.

The median income for a household in the CDP was $27,673, and the median income for a family was $34,645. Males had a median income of $25,638 versus $20,352 for females. The per capita income for the CDP was $20,649. About 5.1% of families and 10.1% of the population were below the poverty line, including 37.3% of those under age 18 and 6.1% of those age 65 or over.
