= County Road 507 =

County Road 507 or County Route 507 may refer to:

- County Road 507 (Brevard County, Florida)
- County Route 507 (New Jersey)
