= Tropical Inn =

Tropical Inn Resort
- Interactive map of the Tropical Inn Resort area

General information
- Location: 4700 Dixie Hwy NE, Palm Bay, Florida, United States
- Coordinates: 28.021807224833598°N 80.57363234304182°W
- Opened: 1964
- Closed: April 12, 2018
- Owner: STF Investments

Tropical Inn Resort was a mixed-use motel and substance rehabilitation center formerly located along northeast Dixie Highway in Palm Bay, Florida.

== Description and History ==
Established in 1964, the Tropical Inn Resort is currently owned by STF investments and was formerly a Days Inn and an LGBTQ-friendly resort. In 2013 it was licensed to operate as a substance rehabilitation center which it opened some time later as the Tropical Wellness Center. On April 12, 2018, it was reported that the Tropical Inn Resort would close permanently after the city of Palm Bay shut off its water due to the hotel's failure to pay an $80,000 water bill.
