= The Compound =

Area of Palm Bay, Florida

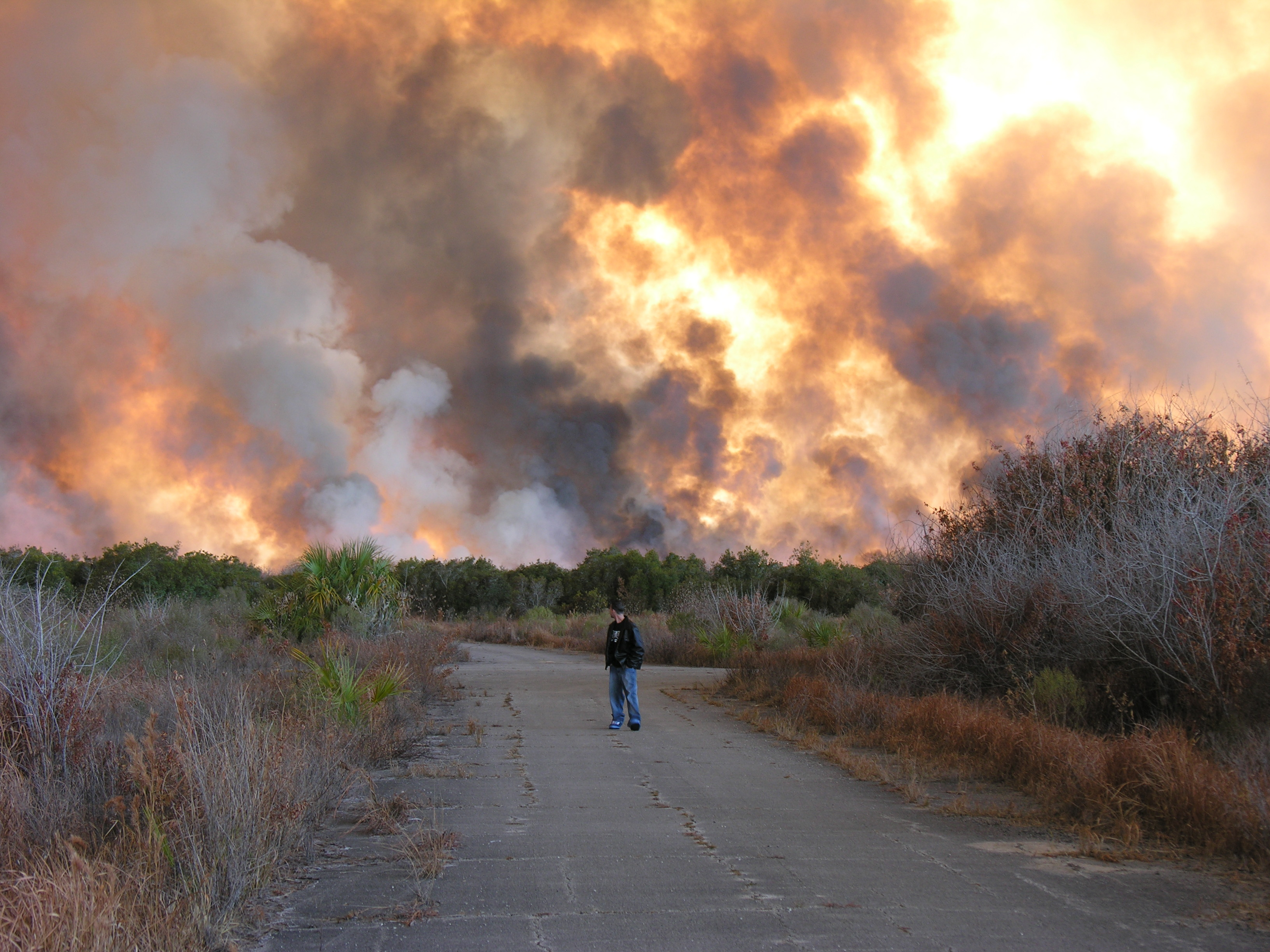
Palm Bay Fire

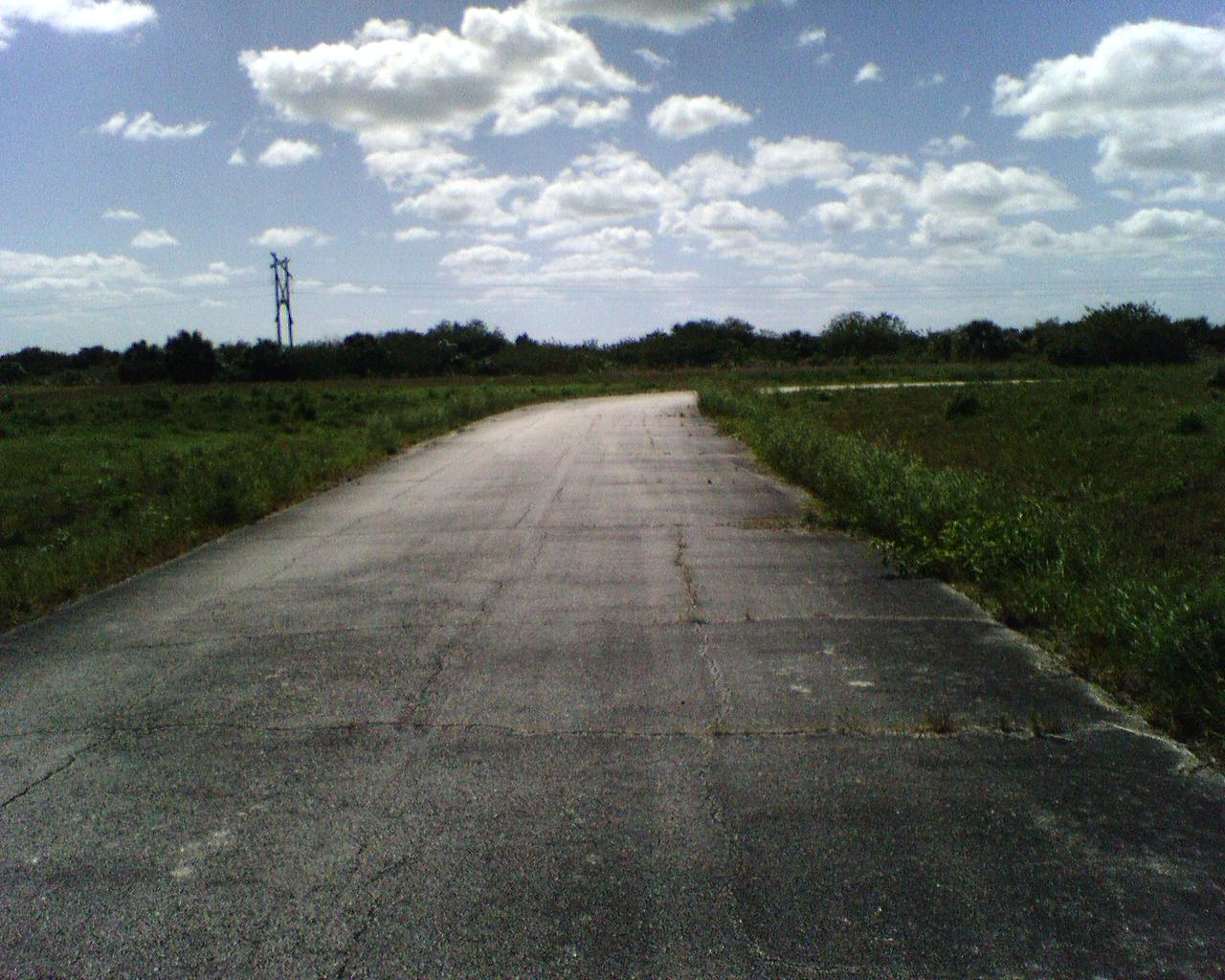
One of the roads inside the Compound.

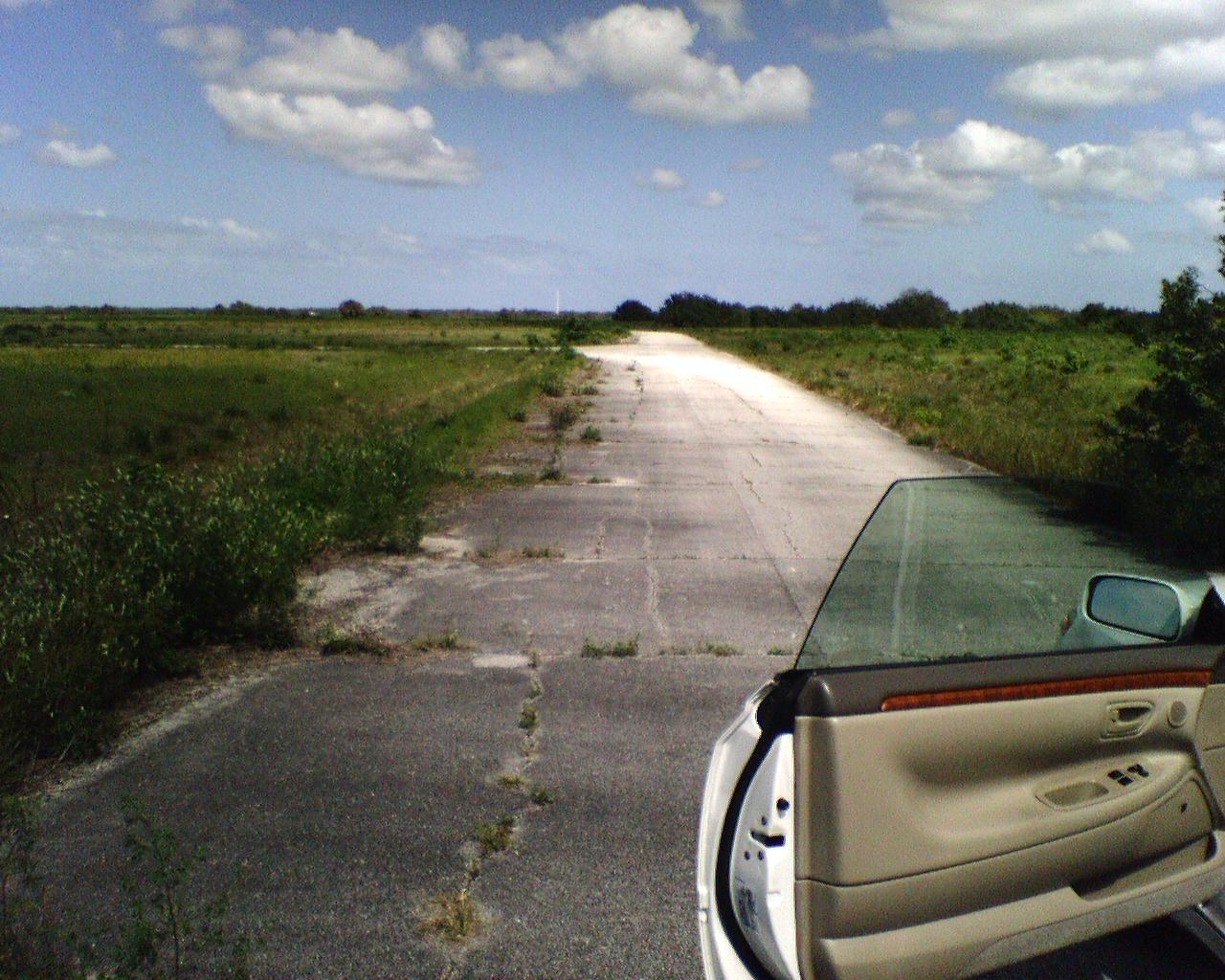
Same road, but in the opposite direction.

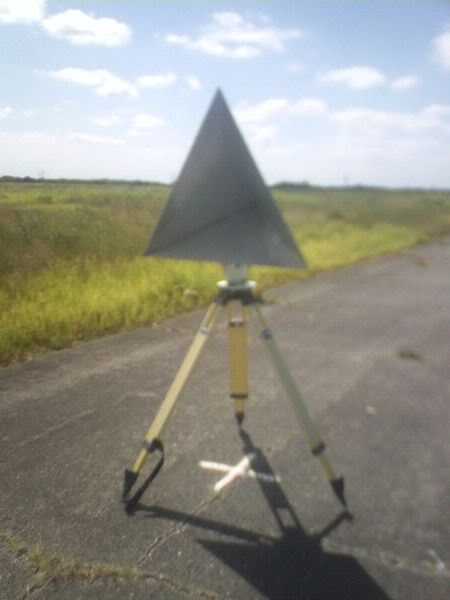
Radio antenna undergoing testing in the compound

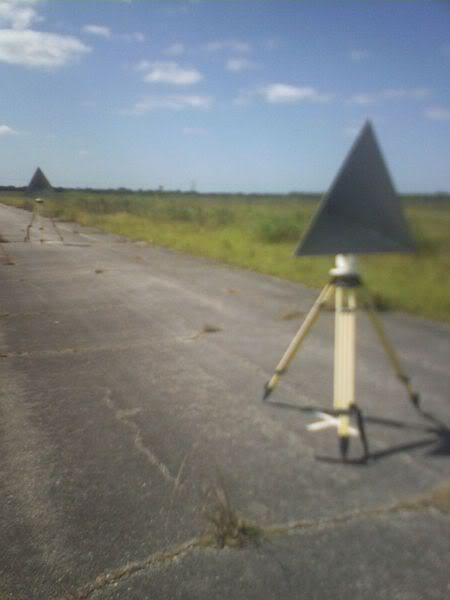
More radio testing

The Compound, also known as "Street Patterns" or "The Grid", is an area in southwestern Palm Bay, Florida, similar to Flagler Estates. It is a largely undeveloped area of some 200 miles (320 km) of paved roadway in various states of disrepair. General Development Corporation began development of the area in the late 1980s, but went bankrupt in 1991 leading to the development's cancellation. Yes

== Geography ==
The Compound is located at 27°56′08″N 80°42′11″W. The area of The Compound is 12.2 square miles (32 km^{2}). To the west is the St. Johns River and Three Forks Conservation Area. To the southeast is Deer Run. To the east is Bayside Lakes, a planned community built in 1999, and to the north is Palm Bay Regional Park. The average elevation is 10 feet (3.0 m) above sea level.

== Crime ==
The Compound has been used for various criminal activities over the near three decades since the area was abandoned, such as drugs dealing, illegal dumping, unsafe discharging of weapons, homicide and street racing to name a few.

Between December 2022 and October 2023, the area has seen a series of disturbing rise in homicides, resulting in the discovery of five deceased individuals. The first two victims, 14-year-old Jeremiah Brown and 16-year-old Travon Anthony Jr., were found shot 33 times on December 25, 2022. Nearly a year to the date of the teens deaths, police arrested then 17, now 18-year-old Jamarcus Simpson in St. Johns County on unrelated charges, as well as charging him with first-degree murder of the two teens.

Subsequently, in February 2023, 44-year-old Nancy Howery was reported missing from Indian Harbor Beach. Her dismembered body was found in March 2023 within the same compound, leading to the arrest of Daniel Stearns in connection with her murder.

In September 2023, Nicholas Mitchell's body was discovered in the compound. Robert Paul Lanning III and Rene Lemos were apprehended after a high-speed chase in Mitchell's car, confessing to his murder. They admitted to luring Mitchell from a Circle K store to the area, where they are accused of murdering him and stealing his vehicle.

On October 7, 2023, authorities were summoned to the area yet again and uncovered sun-bleached, skeletal remains. The Brevard County medical examiner's office is actively working on identifying the remains and determining the cause of death. If confirmed as a homicide, the discovery would mark the fifth homicide victim found within the compound in less than a year.

== Paintball and Airsoft ==
A portion of The Compound housed the inaugural city-managed paintball park, named Hurricane Paintball Park. Within the city limits of Palm Bay, discharging a paintball gun is prohibited except at municipal paintball fields. Addressing concerns over unauthorized paintball activities within The Compound, the Palm Bay City Council directed the Palm Bay Department of Parks and Recreation to establish a sanctioned paintball park. This initiative aimed to provide a secure, lawful, and cost-effective venue for paintball enthusiasts within city limits.

Initially, the park was constructed using city funding, donated materials from local businesses, and volunteer assistance from the paintball community. However, the park faced intermittent closures due to managerial challenges, accusations of misconduct involving contractors, and financial constraints. Notably, "Invincible Paintball," a commercial operator with additional venues in Port St. Lucie and Fort Pierce, was involved in the management of the park at one point, specifically in December 2009 under the name Fillion Paintball.

Presently known as "Palm Bay Paintball Park," the field is owned and operated by "Nightmare Inc." This ownership entity has expanded the park's offerings to include Airsoft gameplay on designated days of the week, diversifying the recreational activities available at the site.

== Off-Road sports ==
The Compound is a frequently visited hotspot for off-road sports enthusiasts, featuring sections of dirt trails formed from repeated use. These trails pose challenges due to the presence of soft, sugar sand in certain spots. Despite its popularity among riders, riding dirt bikes and ATVs off-roading in this location is illegal and constitutes trespassing. Law enforcement has intensified efforts to curb off-road activities following incidents resulting in rider fatalities and accidents.

The northern boundary of the property use to holds particular allure for dirt bikers and ATV riders due to the presence of large man-made hills, these have since been excavated and no longer exist as of 2019. This area in particular is privately owned by Bombardier Inc. According to the Palm Bay Police, trespassing at The Compound and other private properties is considered unlawful, with strict regulations in place to prevent such activities.

== Paramotoring ==
Originally used for surveillance purposes by law enforcement, the Palm Bay Police Department initiated paramotoring activities in the vicinity of The Compound. The expansive area, characterized by vast open spaces, contiguous uninhabited zones, and unobstructed skylines, attracted paramotoring enthusiasts for both recreational use and training purposes. The location's minimal risk operating conditions made it a preferred and safe spot for paramotoring activities.

The paramotoring community, drawn to The Compound's ideal features, actively contributes to the area's preservation. Collaborating with law enforcement, members report violations, maintain a general guardianship of the properties, and engage in property upkeep such as mowing, occasional roadway maintenance, and litter removal. Additionally, the airspace directly above The Compound and some adjoining agricultural and swamp areas is considered among the least congested in Florida. This designation positions the location as an optimal and safe space for paramotoring, contributing significantly to the area's economic revenue by attracting enthusiasts and visitors to Palm Bay and its surrounding areas.

== Spaceport Rocketry Association ==
With permission from the city of Palm Bay and the FAA, Spaceport Rocketry Association (SRA) conducts monthly low, mid, and high power rocket launches in the compound. SRA is affiliated with both the National Association of Rocketry (NAR) and the Tripoli Rocketry Association (TRA).

== Remote control airplane operations ==
RC airplane enthusiasts frequently use the stretch of Sapodilla Rd SW by Wishbone Ave SW.

== Tough Mudder ==
The Compound has played host to two annual Tough Mudder events in 2015, and 2016 respectively. Both events generated large amounts of revenue for both Palm Bay and surrounding areas that hosted competitors. As of 2017, it unknown whether the site will host future Tough Mudder events.

== Future use ==
The St. Johns Heritage Parkway will pass through this portion of Palm Bay as a part of the future connection to its southern most terminal ending at Interstate 95 just north of Micco Rd., construction of this section of the parkway is tentatively set to begin sometime in the 2020s.
