= Frank Smith (Florida settler) =

American politician

Member of the Florida House of Representatives from Brevard County
- In office 1869–1871
- Preceded by: Brevard not represented 1867–1869
- Succeeded by: James Paine, Sr.

Personal details
- Occupation: merchant, postmaster

Military service
- Rank: Captain

Frank Smith was a member of the Florida House of Representatives in the sessions of 1869 and 1870 and also served as Clerk of the Court for Brevard County. He operated a store and post office at Fort Pierce which, at the time, was the only settlement for 37 miles north of Jupiter.

Smith was the first settler of Micco, Florida in 1877. His residence near the old Indian River Inlet supports the belief that the area of the original Indian River Colony, Susannah, near Fort Pierce, was Brevard's early county seat.

== See also ==
- List of members of the Florida House of Representatives from Brevard County, Florida

Preceded by Brevard not represented 1867–1869	Member of the Florida House of Representatives from Brevard County; 1869, 1870	Succeeded by James Paine, Sr.
