= Flagler Estates, Florida =

Unincorporated community in Florida, U.S.

- Census-designated place
- Interactive map of Flagler Estates, Florida
- Coordinates: 29°37′54″N 81°27′36″W
- Country: United States
- State: Florida
- County: St. Johns

Area
  - Total: 11.94 sq mi (30.92 km^{2})
  - Land: 11.85 sq mi (30.69 km^{2})
  - Water: 0.10 sq mi (0.27 km^{2}) 0.87%
- Elevation: 10 ft (3.0 m)

Population (2020)
  - Total: 3,540
  - Density: 298.8/sq mi (115.35/km^{2})
- Time zone: UTC-5 (Eastern (EST))
  - Summer (DST): UTC-4 (EDT)
- ZIP Code: 32145
- Area code: 904
- FIPS code: 12-22560
- GNIS feature ID: 2583341

Flagler Estates is an unincorporated community and census-designated place (CDP) in St. Johns County in the U.S. state of Florida. It is located 8 mi (13 km) southeast of Hastings and is bordered by Flagler County to the south. The population was 3,540 at the 2020 census, up from 3,215 at the 2010 census. It is part of the Jacksonville, Florida Metropolitan Statistical Area.

== Location ==
The Flagler Estates CDP encompasses a total of 11.94 mi^{2} (30.9 km^{2}), 0.87% of which is covered in water, in unincorporated areas of St. Johns County. The main entrance is off State Road 13, onto Flagler Estates Boulevard. There are 6,181 acres (25 km^{2}) of residential lots in Flagler Estates. Most lots are 1.13 acres (4,600 m^{2}) in area, excluding road easement.

Although Flagler Estates cover a wide area, the nearest services are in Palatka, across the St. Johns River. The main river that flows through the central area is Deep Creek. 2.4 miles (3.9 km) east of the area is Old Brick Road, a U.S. National Register of Historic Place. It is located 12 miles (19 km) east of Palatka. The area is known for its large lot sizes.

== Demographics ==
Historical population
Census	Pop.	Note	%±
2010	3,215		—
2020	3,540		10.1%
U.S. Decennial Census

Flagler Estates first appeared as a census designated place in the 2010 U.S. census.

=== 2020 census ===
As of the 2020 census, Flagler Estates had a population of 3,540. The median age was 40.6 years. 23.6% of residents were under the age of 18 and 14.8% of residents were 65 years of age or older. For every 100 females there were 103.1 males, and for every 100 females age 18 and over there were 102.0 males age 18 and over. 1.7% of the population were under 5 years old.

0.0% of residents lived in urban areas, while 100.0% lived in rural areas.

There were 1,256 households in Flagler Estates, of which 29.9% had children under the age of 18 living in them. Of all households, 50.7% were married-couple households, 19.7% were households with a male householder and no spouse or partner present, and 19.8% were households with a female householder and no spouse or partner present. About 20.0% of all households were made up of individuals and 7.8% had someone living alone who was 65 years of age or older.

There were 1,364 housing units, of which 7.9% were vacant. The homeowner vacancy rate was 2.4% and the rental vacancy rate was 10.1%.

Racial composition as of the 2020 census
Race	Number	Percent
White	3,025	85.5%
Black or African American	153	4.3%
American Indian and Alaska Native	18	0.5%
Asian	11	0.3%
Native Hawaiian and Other Pacific Islander	0	0.0%
Some other race	79	2.2%
Two or more races	254	7.2%
Hispanic or Latino (of any race)	276	7.8%

=== Demographic estimates ===
The median household income was $59,875. 16% of the population lived below the poverty threshold, including 24.3% of those under 18 and 14.5% of those over 65. 84.4% of the population 25 years and older had a high school degree or equivalent or higher and 13.5% of that same population had a bachelor's degree or higher. 8.6% of the population were veterans.

== Government jurisdiction ==
Prior to January 2004, the Flagler Estates Road and Water Control District (FERWCD) was located in Flagler and St. Johns counties. The Flagler County portion of the District was removed from the District Boundaries effective January 1, 2004. This de-annexation was codified in Chapter 2006–358, Laws of Florida. In the 2006 codification bill, lands owned by FERWCD north of the Ashley Outfall were added into the District. The Flagler Estates CDP was defined starting in the 2010 census.

== Land use ==
The current land-uses within the District boundaries are generally 1.25-acre (5,100 m^{2}) residential. On the east side of the watershed, outside the District boundaries, the primary land-use is silviculture. On the west side of the watershed, outside the District boundaries, the primary land-use is agricultural. In the Flagler County portion of the watershed, the land-use is mixed between silviculture, agriculture, and wetland. In this area, about 60% of the land area could be classified as wetland.

== Education ==
It is in the St. Johns County School District.

Zoned schools include South Woods Elementary School, Gamble Rogers Middle School, and Pedro Menendez High School.

== See also ==
- The Compound
- Palatka, Florida
- Hastings, Florida
