= Florida State Road 514 =

Highway in Florida

State Road 514
- Malabar Road
- SR 514 highlighted in red

Route information
- Maintained by FDOT
- Length: 4.262 mi (6.859 km)

Major junctions
- West end: I-95 / CR 514 in Palm Bay
- East end: US 1 in Malabar

Location
- Country: United States
- State: Florida
- Counties: Brevard

Highway system
- Florida State Highway System; Interstate; US; State; Former; Pre‑1945; Toll; Scenic
← SR 513	→ SR 516

State Road 514 (SR 514), known locally as Malabar Road, is a 4.262-mile-long (6.859 km) east–west highway that serves eastern Palm Bay and Malabar. It is the only east–west major road in Brevard County to be in both the 27th and 28th degrees latitude.

== Route description ==
SR 514's western terminus is at the interchange with Interstate 95 at exit 173, where the road continues west as County Road 514. Through the city of Palm Bay, Florida, the road is a minimum of four lanes. This narrows down to two lanes as it enters Malabar. The route passes Palm Bay Hospital on the north side. Weber Road and Corey Road, the two major north-south highways through Malabar, both intersect State Road 514. Between the town limits of Malabar and U.S. Route 1, the speed limit decreases from 50 MPH to 30 MPH with two lanes. Both the Town Hall of Malabar and the fire department are located on this road.

== Future ==
=== Causeway ===
There is a proposed causeway over the Indian River Lagoon east of U.S. Route 1, that would extend the state road for two miles (3 km). If it was built, the route would be approximately 6 miles (9.7 km) long totaled. Because of a condominium community on the barrier island, it would steer away from it and head directly east–west to State Road A1A.

=== Improvements ===
In February 2017, the town of Malabar, Florida sent a packet of information to Florida's governor Rick Scott about the numerous problems plaguing the eastern portion of the road. This included recommendations to expand the current two lanes to four in order to align with the portion of road in Palm Bay, Florida as well as adding various traffic control features at several dangerous intersections (such as Weber Road), installing an additional turning lane for Palm Bay Hospital and adding a caution light at the Malabar Fire Department.

== Major intersections ==
The entire route is in Brevard County.

Location	mi	km	Destinations	Notes
Palm Bay	0.000	0.000	west end of state maintenance	
Palm Bay	0.10	0.16	I-95 (SR 9) – Jacksonville, Miami	I-95 exit 173
Palm Bay	0.622	1.001	SR 507 north (Babcock Street / CR 507 south) – Fellsmere	
Malabar	4.262	6.859	US 1 (SR 5)	
1.000 mi = 1.609 km; 1.000 km = 0.621 mi
