= List of county roads in Brevard County, Florida =

- County road shields used in Florida

Highway names
- Interstates: Interstate X (I-X)
- US Highways: U.S. Highway X (US X)
- State: State Road X (SR X)
- County: County Road X (CR X)

System links
- County roads in Florida; County roads in Brevard County

Brevard County, Florida (located in the East of Central Florida), operates a system of county roads that serve all portions of the county. The Brevard County Public Works Department, Road and Bridge Division, is responsible for maintaining all of the Brevard County roads. Most of the county roads are city streets and rural roads.

The numbers and routes of all Florida highways are assigned by the Florida Department of Transportation (FDOT), while county road numbers are assigned by the counties, with guidance from FDOT. North–south routes are generally assigned odd numbers, while east–west routes are generally assigned even numbers.

== CR 3 ==
Tropical Trail and Courtenay Parkway
- Location: Indian Harbour Beach–Merritt Island

CR 3 (former SR 3) is a north–south highway. It begins at an intersection with SR 513 in Indian Harbour Beach and ends at an intersection with SR 520 in Merritt Island, Florida.

For the first five miles the route is extremely narrow, narrowing down to 1.5 lanes in some cases. As a consequence, the speed limit is a low 25 mph. Later, the speed limit rises to 35 mph. Briefly at the highway interchange with Florida State Road 404, the road is a divided four lane road. After the highway interchange, the road narrows to two lanes. The road turns left around Georgianna to follow Tropical Trail. The road is known locally as Banana River Drive for the first half mile and Tropical Trail for the remaining distance.

=== Major intersections ===
The entire route is in Merritt Island, Brevard County.

mi	km	Destinations	Notes
0.000	0.000	SR 513 (South Patrick Boulevard)	south end of county maintenance
4.970	7.998	SR 404 (Pineda Causeway) to US 1	expressway interchange, grade–separated
16.4	26.4	SR 520 (Merritt Island Causeway)	north end of county maintenance, to reach Florida State Road 3 one must travel on SR 520.
1.000 mi = 1.609 km; 1.000 km = 0.621 mi

== CR 5A ==
Deering Parkway
- Location: Scottsmoor
- Length: 1.0 mi (1.6 km)

CR 5A (former Florida State Road 5A), known locally as Deering Parkway, is a 1.06-mile (1.71 km) long county road located entirely within the Brevard County Game Refuge in the unincorporated community of Scottsmoor.

The highway begins at exit 231 from I-95 and travels due northeast through woodlands until it terminates at an intersection with US 1. The highway is the northernmost county route in Brevard County, located only 1 mi (1.6 km) from the Volusia county line. The route is a super two directly in front of the diamond interchange with I-95, which then condenses to an undivided two-lane road for the remainder of its existence. While short, the speed limit is 45 mph.

=== Major intersections ===
The entire route is in Scottsmoor, Brevard County.

mi	km	Destinations	Notes
0.000	0.000	I-95 – Miami, Jacksonville	west end of county maintenance, road converts into dirt
1.060	1.706	US 1	east end of county maintenance and road in general
1.000 mi = 1.609 km; 1.000 km = 0.621 mi

== CR 402 ==
A. Max Brewer Memorial Parkway
- Location: Titusville–Merritt Island NWR

CR 402 (former SR 402) links US 1 in Titusville to Kennedy Parkway at the Merritt Island NWR.

== CR 405 ==
Old Dixie Highway, Parker Street
- Location: Titusville–Mims

CR 405 (former SR 405) exists in two segments. The northernmost, unsigned, rather unknown one links Norwood Avenue in Titusville to Singleton Avenue in Mims. The second one, also unsigned and relatively unknown, links the end of SR 405 to Space Commerce Parkway over the NASA Causeway.

== CR 406 ==
Garden Street
- Location: Titusville

CR 406 (former SR 406) links Carpenter Road to I-95 in Titusville.

== CR 502 ==
Barnes Boulevard
- Location: Rockledge

CR 502 (former SR 502) links I-95 and SR 519 in Rockledge to US 1.

== CR 503 ==
Dixon Boulevard
- Location: Cocoa

CR 503 (former SR 503) links SR 501 in Cocoa to US 1.

== CR 507 ==
Babcock Street
- Location: Indian River county line–Palm Bay

CR 507 (former SR 507 north of US 192) is a pair of extensions of State Road 507 north from US 192 in Melbourne to US 1 and south from SR 514 in Palm Bay to Indian River County.

== CR 509 ==
Wickham Road, Minton Road
- Location: Palm Bay–Viera
- Length: 19 mi (31 km)

County Road 509 (former SR 509) is a major north–south throughway in southern and central Brevard County, Florida. The road extends 19 miles (31 km) from Palm Bay to Viera. North of New Haven Avenue (US 192/SR 500) in West Melbourne, CR 509 is known locally as Wickham Road; south of the U.S. Highway, its street name is Minton Road (in the 1980s and 1990s, this 5.6 miles (9.0 km) section of current CR 509 was signed by Florida Department of Transportation as State Road 509).

It carries up to 37,960 vehicles daily.

The current southern terminus of County Road 509 is an intersection with Malabar Road (CR 514, a westward extension of State Road 514); the northern terminus is an interchange with Interstate 95 (SR 9) in the midst of Pineda, Suntree, and Viera.

=== History ===
The northern section of the road was named after the Wickham family, including John Q. Wickham, a Brevard county surveyor and Joe Wickham, a prominent Brevard County politician. Joe Wickham worked with the county to clear the route in 1950s. Since the road led to an undeveloped area, some viewed the project with skepticism. However, the planned road made sense because it ran between two ranges 36 and 37, which effectively divided the county in half. Upon completion, the road led to development of Suntree and Viera in the late 1970s. Development in the area on the northern terminus picked up considerably with the completion of I-95.

In 1929, Malabar Road was extended to the north. Later, this northern section of Malabar was redesignated as Minton Road, named after Alton M. Minton, who owned a drug store at Mintons Corner Shopping Center. By 1957, the locals referred to the area this road traveled through as Minton's Corner. In the early 1980s, Brevard County exercised eminent domain and purchased 18 houses to clear land in a road improvement project near the intersection between Wickham and Minton roads. This project aligned Minton Road with Wickham Road.

In 2013, a county commissioner reported that Minton is probably the heaviest traveled route in the county. He added that it was failing for lack of proper maintenance.

== CR 511 ==
John Rodes Boulevard, Aurora Road
- Location: West Melbourne–Eau Gallie
- Length: 8.1 mi (13.0 km)

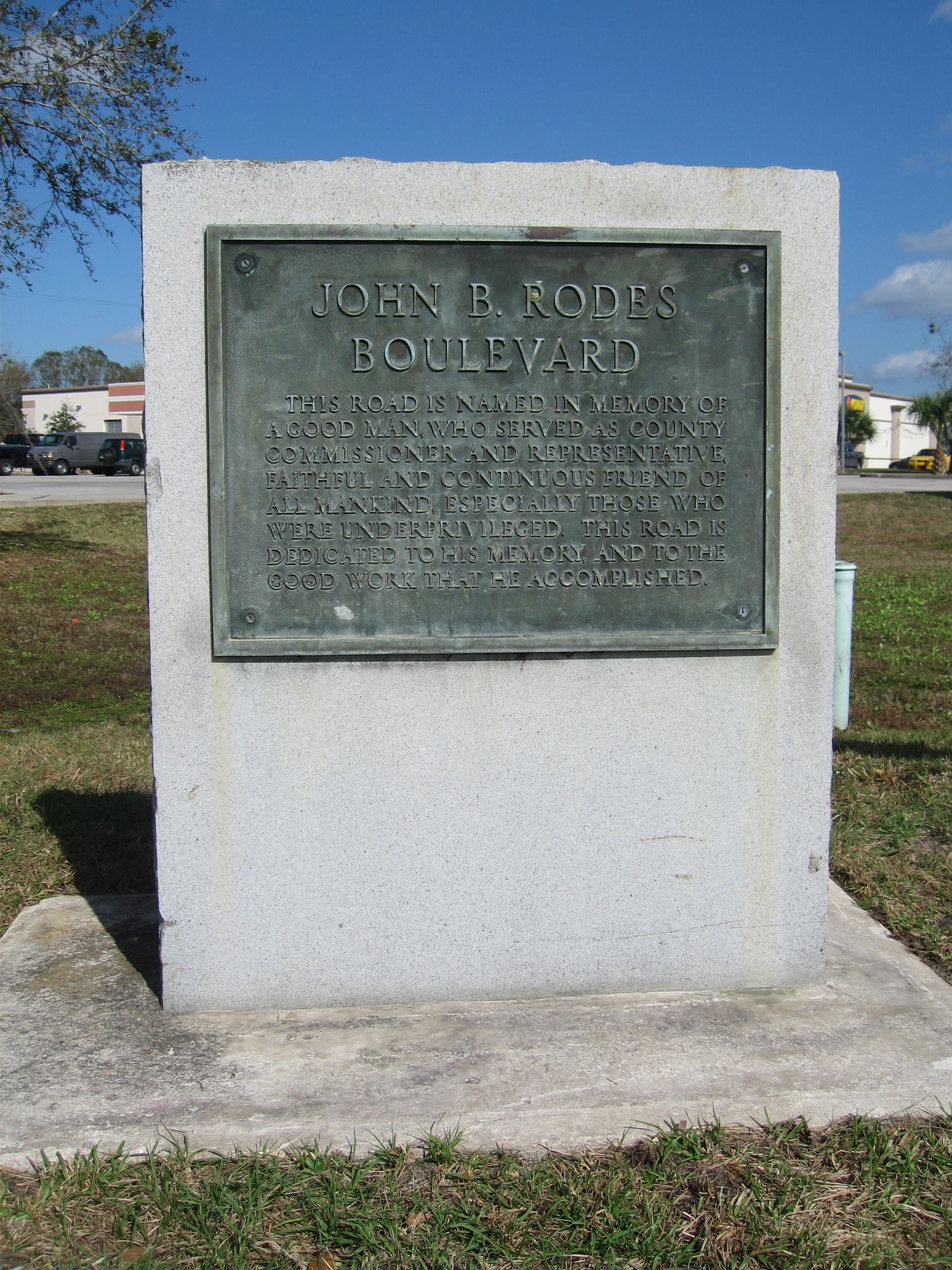
John Rodes Boulevard memorial

County Road 511 (former SR 511) consists of a north–south street and an east–west avenue in the Melbourne, Florida, area. The 8.1-mile (13.0 km) road is locally known as John Rodes Boulevard and Aurora Road. The southern terminus of CR 511 is an intersection with New Haven Avenue (US 192-SR 500) in June Park, just outside the city limits of West Melbourne and three blocks from a diamond interchange between New Haven Avenue and Interstate 95 (SR 9); the eastern terminus is an intersection with Harbor City Boulevard (US 1-SR 5) in the Eau Gallie section of Melbourne.

John Rodes Boulevard extends four miles (6 km) north–south between US 192 and Aurora Road, which continues CR 511 as an east–west commercial and residential street. Until the late 1990s, the southernmost 3.0 miles (4.8 km) of CR 511/John Rodes Boulevard (south of Eau Gallie Boulevard/SR 518) was signed by Florida Department of Transportation as State Road 511. The former State Road serves as an access road for I-95. The southernmost 3.0 miles (4.8 km) of John Rodes Boulevard has several communities along it. One of these is Hammock Trace Preserve, which is about 1-mile (1.6 km) south of Eau Gallie Blvd on John Rodes Blvd.

While Aurora Road has maintained its importance as a commercial and residential avenue, the character of John Rodes Boulevard has changed since the 1980s due to population growth in June Park, Melbourne, West Melbourne, and nearby Palm Bay. Urbanization has replaced much of the woodland on both sides on the former SR 511 as trees gave way to business and industrial parks, trailer parks, and suburban residential developments.

=== History ===
John Rodes Boulevard was named after John B. Rodes, a local politician. Aurora Road was initially named 5th Street as town of Eau Gallie was first established. Later, a local resident renamed it Aurora Road after his hometown in Illinois.

Browse numbered routes
← SR 510	FL	→ SR 513

== CR 514 ==
Malabar Road
- Location: Palm Bay

CR 514 (former SR 514) links the end of CR 509 to I-95 at the west end of SR 514 in Palm Bay.

== CR 515 ==
Rockledge Drive, Brevard Avenue, Indian River Drive
- Location: Rockledge–Sharpes

CR 515 (former SR 515) links US 1 in Rockledge to US 1 in Sharpes. The highway is widely known by locals as "The Scenic Road" because it runs along the Indian River Lagoon.

== CR 516 ==
Palm Bay Road
- Location: Palm Bay

County Road 516 (former SR 516), locally known as Palm Bay Road, is a former state highway in Brevard County, located entirely in Palm Bay. Between CR 509 and State Road 507, it forms the southern borders of the cities of West Melbourne and Melbourne. CR 516 is mostly 6 lanes wide.

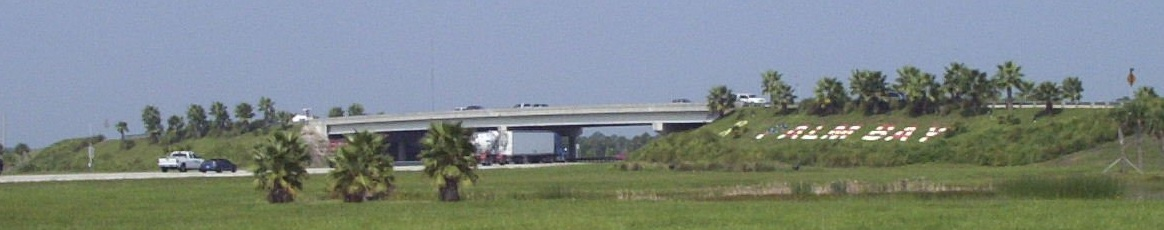
Palm Bay entrance sign on the overpass of Palm Bay Road

The western terminus is with an intersection of CR 509 in Palm Bay, just 262 inches south of West Melbourne. Just west of Interstate 95, an access road called Culver Drive spurs off Emerson Drive and provides access to Interstate 95 for residents of Palm Bay enclosed by CR 509, SR 514, Interstate 95, and Palm Bay Road itself. At Interstate 95, Palm Bay Road forms an overpass that has the name "Palm Bay" on both sides of the overpass. It was erected in 2002, and modified ever since. The eastern terminus is with an intersection with FL 507 in eastern Palm Bay.

=== Major intersections ===
The entire route is located in Palm Bay, Brevard County.

Mile	Destinations	Notes
0	CR 509 (Minton Road)	Western terminus
0.745	I-95 – West Palm Beach, Daytona Beach	Exit 176 on I-95
3.043	SR 507 (Babcock Street)	Eastern terminus
1.000 mi = 1.609 km; 1.000 km = 0.621 mi

== CR 5054 ==
Sarno Road
- Location: Melbourne

CR 5054 links the east end of SR 5054 at CR 509 to US 1 in Melbourne.
