= June Park, Florida =

- Census-designated place
- Location in Brevard County and the state of Florida
- Coordinates: 28°04′19″N 80°41′15″W
- Country: United States
- State: Florida
- County: Brevard

Area
  - Total: 3.03 sq mi (7.85 km^{2})
  - Land: 3.03 sq mi (7.84 km^{2})
  - Water: 0.0039 sq mi (0.01 km^{2})
- Elevation: 26 ft (7.9 m)

Population (2020)
  - Total: 4,283
  - Density: 1,415/sq mi (546.3/km^{2})
- Time zone: UTC-5 (Eastern (EST))
  - Summer (DST): UTC-4 (EDT)
- ZIP code: 32904
- Area code: 321
- FIPS code: 12-35800
- GNIS feature ID: 2402636

June Park is a census-designated place (CDP) in Brevard County, Florida. The population was 4,283 at the 2020 United States census, up from 4,094 at the 2010 United States census. It is part of the Palm Bay–Melbourne–Titusville, Florida Metropolitan Statistical Area.

== Geography ==
According to the United States Census Bureau, the CDP has a total area of 3.4 square miles (8.8 km^{2}), all composed of land.

== Demographics ==
Historical population
Census	Pop.	Note	%±
1990	4,080		—
2000	4,367		7.0%
2010	4,094		−6.3%
2020	4,283		4.6%
U.S. Decennial Census

=== 2020 census ===
As of the 2020 census, June Park had a population of 4,283. The median age was 49.4 years. 17.6% of residents were under the age of 18 and 23.1% of residents were 65 years of age or older. For every 100 females there were 99.1 males, and for every 100 females age 18 and over there were 96.2 males age 18 and over.

100.0% of residents lived in urban areas, while 0.0% lived in rural areas.

There were 1,738 households in June Park, of which 22.0% had children under the age of 18 living in them. Of all households, 52.7% were married-couple households, 19.0% were households with a male householder and no spouse or partner present, and 21.0% were households with a female householder and no spouse or partner present. About 24.4% of all households were made up of individuals and 11.9% had someone living alone who was 65 years of age or older.

There were 1,885 housing units, of which 7.8% were vacant. The homeowner vacancy rate was 1.4% and the rental vacancy rate was 3.8%.

Racial composition as of the 2020 census
Race	Number	Percent
White	3,591	83.8%
Black or African American	67	1.6%
American Indian and Alaska Native	25	0.6%
Asian	88	2.1%
Native Hawaiian and Other Pacific Islander	2	0.0%
Some other race	97	2.3%
Two or more races	413	9.6%
Hispanic or Latino (of any race)	342	8.0%

=== 2000 census ===
As of the 2000 census, there were 4,367 people, 1,736 households, and 1,274 families residing in the CDP. The population density was 1,171.0 inhabitants per square mile (452.1/km^{2}). There were 1,859 housing units at an average density of 498.5 per square mile (192.5/km^{2}). The racial makeup of the CDP was 96.86% White, 0.76% African American, 0.16% Native American, 1.21% Asian, 0.14% from other races, and 0.87% from two or more races. Hispanic or Latino of any race were 2.29% of the population.

There were 1,736 households, out of which 27.1% had children under the age of 18 living with them, 61.8% were married couples living together, 7.6% had a female householder with no husband present, and 26.6% were non-families. 20.7% of all households were made up of individuals, and 8.5% had someone living alone who was 65 years of age or older. The average household size was 2.51 and the average family size was 2.89.

In the CDP, the population was spread out, with 21.2% under the age of 18, 6.2% from 18 to 24, 26.2% from 25 to 44, 28.0% from 45 to 64, and 18.3% who were 65 years of age or older. The median age was 43 years. For every 100 females, there were 99.8 males. For every 100 females age 18 and over, there were 100.7 males.

The median income for a household in the CDP was $43,670, while the median income for a family was $49,926. Males had a median income of $39,821 versus $26,386 for females. The per capita income for the CDP was $24,147. About 4.2% of families and 4.9% of the population were below the poverty line, including 6.9% of those under age 18 and 5.3% of those age 65 or over.
