= Florida State Road 507 =

State highway in Florida, United States

State Road 507
- Babcock Street
- SR 507 in red, CR 507 in blue

Route information
- Maintained by FDOT
- Length: 5.528 mi (8.896 km)

Major junctions
- South end: SR 514 / CR 507 in Palm Bay
- North end: US 192 / CR 507 in Melbourne

Location
- Country: United States
- State: Florida
- Counties: Brevard

Highway system
- Florida State Highway System; Interstate; US; State; Former; Pre‑1945; Toll; Scenic
← SR 501	→ SR 508

State Road 507 (SR 507) is a 4.9-mile-long (7.9 km), four-lane highway serving Melbourne and Palm Bay, Florida. It is also known locally as Babcock Street. The southern terminus is an intersection with Malabar Road (SR 514 east of SR 507, County Road 514 west of it) in Palm Bay; the current northern terminus is an intersection with New Haven Avenue (U.S. Highway 192 (US 192)/SR 500) in Melbourne.

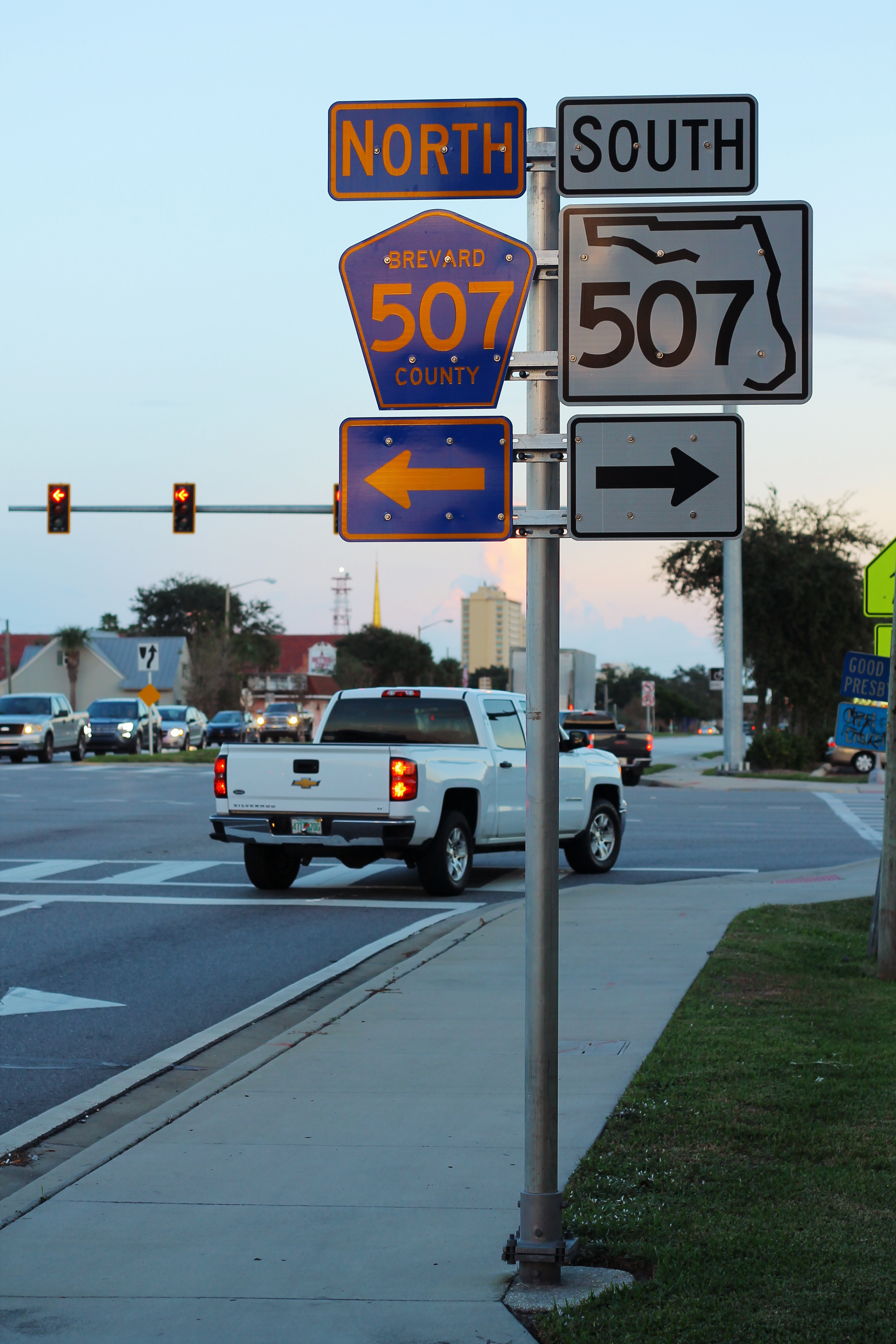
Signs denoting SR 507 and CR 507, located at US 192 and Babcock Road in Melbourne

== Route description ==
Babcock Street is a major commuter road for Palm Bay, one of the fastest-growing cities in the United States since 1980. The northern half (in Melbourne) features shopping centers and the main campus of Florida Institute of Technology; the southern half (in Palm Bay) passes through a large housing development.

== County Road 507 ==
South of SR 514, Babcock Road becomes a signed County Road 507 (CR 507), which continues 13 miles (21 km) southward to the boundary between Brevard County and Indian River County, four miles (6 km) north of Fellsmere. The road continues as County Road 507 to the intersection of County Road 512. Major destinations the road passes through are Port Malabar Industrial Park, Fountainhead Memorial Park, Greenwood Plantation, Deer Run, Sebastian Canal, and Downtown Fellsmere.

County Road 507 north of US 192 is a primary commercial boulevard for Melbourne, with businesses lining both sides of the street.

== History ==
The historic northern terminus is 2.2 miles (3.5 km) further north, an intersection with Harbor City Boulevard (U.S. Route 1/SR 5), also in Melbourne (the former northern section of SR 507 is now unsigned County Road 507).

== Major intersections ==
The entire route is in Brevard County.

Location	mi	km	Destinations	Notes
Palm Bay	0.000	0.000	SR 514 (Malabar Road) to I-95 – Fairgrounds	
Palm Bay	2.528	4.068	CR 516 west (Palm Bay Road) to I-95	
Melbourne	5.528	8.896	US 192 (New Haven Avenue / SR 500) – Henegar Center, Historic Downtown Melbourne	
1.000 mi = 1.609 km; 1.000 km = 0.621 mi
