= Fred Poppe Regional Park =

Park in Brevard County, Florida

Coordinates: 28.0085°N 80.7331°W

Fred Poppe Regional Park is a park located in the City of Palm Bay within Brevard County, Florida.

== Activities ==
There are many places to exercise in Fred Poppe Regional Park. There's 5 soccer fields, a playground, an 18 hole disc golf course, and jogging trail. There's also Ted Whitlock Community Center.

Ted Whitlock Community Center is an 18,000 square foot community center offering a gymnasium, game room, billiards room, banquet kitchen, multi-use/banquet room with a divider and two sets of restrooms. (One with a shower).

== Accessibility ==
=== Malabar Road (CR 514) ===
Malabar Road (CR 514) westbound is one of two ways to access the park's location, and the only way to access it directly.

=== St. Johns Heritage Parkway ===
The St. Johns Heritage Parkway provides another means of access to the park from the northwest sections of Palm Bay and Melbourne. The road leads to Malabar Road as the way to access the park.

== Renaming ==
In November of 2016 the park, formerly known as Palm Bay Regional Park, was renamed to Fred Poppe Regional Park in honor of longtime Palm Bay Parks & Recreation employee Fred Poppe.
