= Palm Bay Hospital =

Coordinates: 28.0002316°N 80.6115298°W

The Palm Bay Hospital is a not-for-profit hospital operated by Health First. It is located in Palm Bay, Florida. It is a 152-bed facility, including 52 medical/surgical beds and has 12-bed Intensive Care Unit.

== History ==
The hospital was originally named the Palm Bay Community Hospital. In 2008, they removed the "Community" from its name.

In April 2007, Health First broke ground on a $83.5 million expansion project. The expansion will more than double the size of the hospital addressing the hospital's robust utilization and the future growth needs of Palm Bay and its surrounding community.

Health First invested $76.5 million into upgrades from 2007 to 2009.

In 2011, it had 89.4% of its admissions through the emergency room, more than any other hospital in Brevard and above the state average of 61.6%. Some of this difference can be explained by procedural differences in how hospitals admit patients.
