= Malabar, Florida =

Town in the state of Florida, United States

- Town
- Town of Malabar
- Seal

- Location in Brevard County and the state of Florida
- Coordinates: 27°59′39″N 80°34′37″W
- Country: United States
- State: Florida
- County: Brevard
- Settled: c. Late 1800s
- Incorporated: 1962
- Officially Incorporated: 1969

Government
  - Type: Mayor–Council
  - Mayor: Steve Rivet
  - Councilors: Cliff Dykes, Wayne Abare, Frederick Heiler, Mary Hofmeister, and Marisa Acquaviva
  - Town Manager: Lisa Morrell
  - Town Clerk: Richard W. Kohler
  - Town Attorney: Karl Bohne

Area
  - Total: 13.27 sq mi (34.36 km^{2})
  - Land: 10.70 sq mi (27.70 km^{2})
  - Water: 2.57 sq mi (6.66 km^{2})
- Elevation: 23 ft (7.0 m)

Population (2020)
  - Total: 2,949
  - Density: 275.8/sq mi (106.47/km^{2})
- Time zone: UTC-5 (Eastern (EST))
  - Summer (DST): UTC-4 (EDT)
- ZIP code: 32950
- Area code: 321
- FIPS code: 12-42625
- GNIS feature ID: 2406082
- Website: http://www.TownOfMalabar.org/

Malabar is a town in Brevard County, Florida. It is part of the Palm Bay–Melbourne–Titusville, Florida Metropolitan Statistical Area. The population was 2,949 at the 2020 United States census, up from 2,757 at the 2010 census.

== Geography ==
According to the United States Census Bureau, the town has a total area of 13.2 square miles (34 km^{2}). 10.6 square miles (27 km^{2}) of it is land and 2.6 square miles (6.7 km^{2}) of it (19.53%) is water.

=== Climate ===
The climate for the Town of Malabar is characterized by hot, humid summers and generally mild to cool winters. According to the Köppen Climate Classification system, Malabar has a humid subtropical climate zone, abbreviated "Cfa" on climate maps.

Climate data for Malabar, FL
Month	Jan	Feb	Mar	Apr	May	Jun	Jul	Aug	Sep	Oct	Nov	Dec	Year
Record high °F (°C)	89 (32)	91 (33)	93 (34)	97 (36)	99 (37)	101 (38)	102 (39)	101 (38)	98 (37)	96 (36)	91 (33)	93 (34)	102 (39)
Mean daily maximum °F (°C)	71 (22)	74 (23)	77 (25)	81 (27)	86 (30)	89 (32)	91 (33)	91 (33)	88 (31)	84 (29)	79 (26)	73 (23)	82 (28)
Mean daily minimum °F (°C)	49 (9)	52 (11)	55 (13)	60 (16)	67 (19)	72 (22)	73 (23)	73 (23)	73 (23)	68 (20)	60 (16)	53 (12)	63 (17)
Record low °F (°C)	17 (−8)	27 (−3)	25 (−4)	35 (2)	47 (8)	55 (13)	60 (16)	60 (16)	57 (14)	41 (5)	30 (−1)	21 (−6)	17 (−8)
Average precipitation inches (mm)	2.27 (58)	2.63 (67)	3.28 (83)	2.13 (54)	3.29 (84)	6.71 (170)	5.96 (151)	7.68 (195)	7.64 (194)	5.06 (129)	2.88 (73)	2.57 (65)	52.10 (1,323)

== Demographics ==
Historical population
Census	Pop.	Note	%±
1970	634		—
1980	1,118		76.3%
1990	1,977		76.8%
2000	2,622		32.6%
2010	2,757		5.1%
2020	2,949		7.0%
U.S. Decennial Census

=== Racial and ethnic composition ===
Malabar racial composition (Hispanics excluded from racial categories) (NH = Non-Hispanic)
Race	Pop 2010	Pop 2020	% 2010	% 2020
White (NH)	2,453	2,382	88.97%	80.77%
Black or African American (NH)	97	106	3.52%	3.59%
Native American or Alaska Native (NH)	13	4	0.47%	0.14%
Asian (NH)	25	60	0.91%	2.03%
Pacific Islander or Native Hawaiian (NH)	1	3	0.04%	0.10%
Some other race (NH)	0	15	0.00%	0.51%
Two or more races/Multiracial (NH)	54	176	1.96%	5.97%
Hispanic or Latino (any race)	114	203	4.13%	6.88%
Total	2,757	2,949		

=== 2020 census ===
As of the 2020 census, Malabar had a population of 2,949. The median age was 55.4 years. 14.5% of residents were under the age of 18 and 26.5% of residents were 65 years of age or older. For every 100 females there were 107.7 males, and for every 100 females age 18 and over there were 109.4 males age 18 and over.

As of 2020, 25.9% of residents lived in urban areas, while 74.1% lived in rural areas.

In 2020, there were 1,244 households in Malabar, of which 22.4% had children under the age of 18 living in them. Of all households, 58.6% were married-couple households, 19.0% were households with a male householder and no spouse or partner present, and 16.0% were households with a female householder and no spouse or partner present. About 22.1% of all households were made up of individuals and 11.5% had someone living alone who was 65 years of age or older.

In 2020, there were 1,359 housing units, of which 8.5% were vacant. The homeowner vacancy rate was 1.1% and the rental vacancy rate was 17.4%.

According to the 2020 American Community Survey, there were 947 families residing in the town.

=== 2010 census ===
As of the 2010 United States census, there were 2,757 people, 949 households, and 766 families residing in the town.

=== 2000 census ===
As of the census of 2000, there were 2,622 people, 1,033 households, and 757 families residing in the town. The population density was 246.6 inhabitants per square mile (95.2/km^{2}). There were 1,177 housing units at an average density of 110.7 units per square mile (42.7 units/km^{2}). The racial makeup of the town was 93.48% White, 2.78% African American, 0.53% Native American, 1.14% Asian, 0.11% Pacific Islander, 0.34% from other races, and 1.60% from two or more races. Hispanic or Latino of any race were 2.63% of the population.

In 2000, there were 1,033 households, out of which 26.9% had children under the age of 18 living with them, 63.5% were married couples living together, 6.8% had a female householder with no husband present, and 26.7% were non-families. 21.3% of all households were made up of individuals, and 8.7% had someone living alone who was 65 years of age or older. The average household size was 2.53 and the average family size was 2.95.

In 2000, in the town, the population was spread out, with 22.4% under the age of 18, 5.8% from 18 to 24, 25.3% from 25 to 44, 30.9% from 45 to 64, and 15.6% who were 65 years of age or older. The median age was 44 years. For every 100 females, there were 105.5 males. For every 100 females age 18 and over, there were 100.1 males.

In 2000, the median income for a household in the town was $49,674, and the median income for a family was $62,321. Males had a median income of $37,050 versus $23,125 for females. The per capita income for the town was $22,502. About 7.5% of families and 10.7% of the population were below the poverty line, including 5.5% of those under age 18 and 4.2% of those age 65 or over.

== Government ==
Malabar has a strong council form of government consisting of a five-seat Town Council (one from each of Malabar's five districts), and a mayor to serve as a figurehead and for ceremonial purposes. The council members must reside in the district they represent; each district's registered voters vote for their respective district council seat. Council members serve two year terms; district 1, 2, and 3 members are elected in even numbered years, and district 4 and 5 in odd numbered years. The mayor serves a four-year term elected the same year as the US presidential election. Town council members are subject to a three-term (six-year) limit, but may run again and serve up to another six years after sitting out one term. The mayor has a two-term (eight-year) limit, and may also run again after sitting out one term. Day-to-day operation of the Town and its finances is handled by a Town Manager/Administrator and a Town Clerk/Treasurer, both of whom report directly to the Town Council. Public works, the fire department, (a hybrid volunteer/paid professional department) report to the Town Manager/Administrator, and the clerk's office reports to the Town Clerk/Treasurer. There are several advisory boards authorized by the town charter who advise and report to the Town Council.

In 2007, the town had a taxable real estate base of $282.32 million. As of 2007, Malabar had the lowest property tax rates of any area of Brevard County, including unincorporated areas of the county. In early 2019, the Town Council voted unanimously to designate the Town as a sandhill crane sanctuary, affording the birds extra attention to protect them within the town borders. It also designated the sandhill crane the official town bird (Town Resolution 08–2018, May 20, 2019).

== Transportation ==
=== Main roads ===
==== Malabar Road (Florida State Road 514) ====
This route is the way to go to Palm Bay and surrounding.

==== Weber Road ====
This route is the way to go to Grant-Valkaria, Florida.

==== Corey Road ====
This is another route to go to Grant-Valkaria, Florida.

==== Atz Road ====
This road connects from west of Weber Road through Corey Road and on to LaCourt Lane.

==== Hall Road ====
This road connects from west of Weber Road through Corey Road and on to Marie Street.

== Notable people ==
- John Glenn, former astronaut and US Senator who lived in Malabar during his retirement years
- Jake Owen, country music singer who owns a home in Malabar
