= Deer Run, Florida =

Deer Run, Brevard County, Florida
- Community
- Interactive map of Deer Run, Brevard County, Florida
- Coordinates: 27°52′3″N 80°39′39″W
- Country: United States
- State: Florida
- County: Brevard

Area
  - Total: 2.5 sq mi (6.5 km^{2})
- Time zone: UTC-5 (Eastern (EST))
  - Summer (DST): UTC-4 (EDT)
- ZIP code: 32909
- Area code: 321

Deer Run is an equestrian community in Brevard, Florida, United States known for rural living and its wildlife. The community began when Cavalier Properties Inc. along with Atico Financial Corp purchased the former citrus grove property July 10, 1980 for the sum of $2,715,000. The development was officially completed on January 27, 1983. The community was platted thereafter with 560 lots over 2.5 square miles. There are currently 462 land parcels enclosed within a Homeowners Association. Some parcels have been combined. The lot sizes begin at 2.5 acres. As of 2024 about 185 of the parcels have been developed. Deer Run Community park at 273 Cavalier Street features a community building, picnic area, tennis court, an equestrian arena and riding pen. Deer Run features miles of horse riding trails within the community.

== Geography ==
Deer Run is located at 27°52′3″N 80°39′39″W (27.8675029, -80.6607306). The community is located in Brevard County unincorporated having a mailing address of "Palm Bay" in the 32909 zip code.

== History ==
The community which is now Deer Run Community Association began as a citrus grove known as San Sebastian Farms. Development of the area began in the early 1980s with the first home owners building in 1983. The community began to be more noticed when the St. John's Heritage Parkway exit #166 on I-95 was installed in 2019. The area surrounding Deer Run is now slated to be developed on bordering properties.
