= West Melbourne, Florida =

- City
- City of West Melbourne
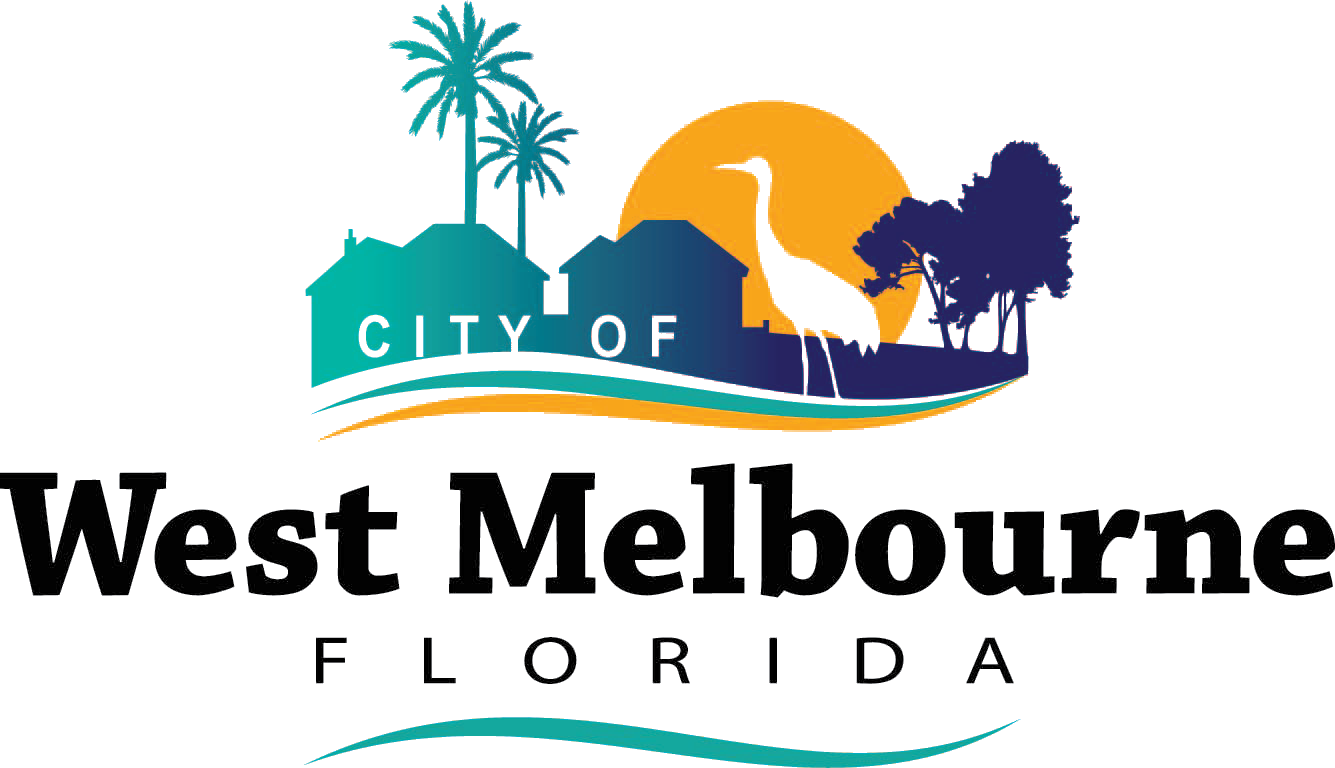
- Seal
- Motto: "Creating New Horizons"
- Location in Brevard County and the U.S. state of Florida
- Coordinates: 28°02′20″N 80°39′31″W
- Country: United States
- State: Florida
- County: Brevard
- Incorporated: September 11, 1959

Government
  - Type: Council-Manager

Area
  - Total: 10.86 sq mi (28.13 km^{2})
  - Land: 10.66 sq mi (27.60 km^{2})
  - Water: 0.20 sq mi (0.53 km^{2})
- Elevation: 26 ft (7.9 m)

Population (2020)
  - Total: 25,924
  - Density: 2,432.7/sq mi (939.28/km^{2})
- Time zone: UTC-5 (Eastern (EST))
  - Summer (DST): UTC-4 (EDT)
- ZIP codes: 32904, 32912
- Area code: 321
- FIPS code: 12-76500
- GNIS feature ID: 2405709
- Website: www.westmelbourne.gov

West Melbourne is a city in Brevard County, Florida, United States. It was created in 1959 to stop the area from being annexed into the city of Melbourne. Since 2000, the city has experienced the highest population growth percentage of any municipality in Brevard County. It is part of the Palm Bay–Melbourne–Titusville Metropolitan Statistical Area. As of the 2020 census, West Melbourne had a population of 25,924.

== History ==
Voters created the city in 1959 to stop the area from being annexed into the City of Melbourne.

In 1970, the city's population was approximately 3,050.

Since 2000, the city has experienced the highest population growth percentage of any municipality in Brevard County.

In 2005, the City of West Melbourne started charging property taxes for the first time in its existence (since 1959). Prior to 2005, the city survived on a "fees only" tax revenue system for its $17 million budget.

From 2005 to 2014, home-schooled students, all three children from a West Melbourne family, won the state spelling bee championship a total of seven times, from two to three times each.

== Government ==
The City of West Melbourne utilizes a Council-Manager form of government. The City Council consists of the mayor and six council members. The City Management consists of a city manager and a twelve-person executive management team. The city government offices are located at the West Melbourne City Hall.

In 2007, the city had a taxable real estate base of $1.32 billion.

In 2011, about half the city general fund was spent on the police department.

=== City council ===
- Pat Bentley, Mayor (November 2020 – Present)
- Diana Adams, Deputy Mayor (November 2022 – Present)
- Andrea Young, Council Member (November 2022 – Present)
- John Dittmore, Council Member, Council Member (November 2022 – Present)
- Stephen Phrampus, Council Member (November 2020 – Present)
- Daniel McDow, Council Member (November 2020 – Present)
- Helen Voltz, Council Member (November 2023 – Present)

=== City management ===
The city experienced a 35% increase in crime for 2010, the highest rise in Brevard County, most areas of which experienced a drop in crime. This included 48.5% more burglaries.

In 2010 the number of police officers dropped from 38 to 33, due to a hiring freeze.

The fee for garbage disposal was $10.24 per month per household in 2011–2012.

Personnel who operate the city government, under the guidance of the city council, include:

- Tim Rhode, City Manager
- Gregory Vesta, Police Chief
- John Cary, City Attorney

== Geography ==
According to the U.S. Census Bureau, the city has a total area of 10.2 square miles (26.5 km^{2}). 10.2 square miles (26.4 km^{2}) of it is land, and 0.04 square miles (0.1 km^{2}) of it (0.21%) is water.

=== Climate ===
The climate in this area is characterized by hot, humid summers and generally mild winters. According to the Köppen climate classification, the City of West Melbourne has a humid subtropical climate zone (Cfa).

Climate data for West Melbourne, FL
Month	Jan	Feb	Mar	Apr	May	Jun	Jul	Aug	Sep	Oct	Nov	Dec	Year
Record high °F (°C)	89 (32)	91 (33)	93 (34)	97 (36)	99 (37)	101 (38)	102 (39)	101 (38)	98 (37)	96 (36)	91 (33)	93 (34)	102 (39)
Mean daily maximum °F (°C)	71 (22)	74 (23)	77 (25)	81 (27)	86 (30)	89 (32)	91 (33)	91 (33)	88 (31)	84 (29)	79 (26)	73 (23)	82 (28)
Daily mean °F (°C)	60 (16)	63 (17)	66 (19)	71 (22)	77 (25)	81 (27)	82 (28)	82 (28)	81 (27)	76 (24)	70 (21)	63 (17)	73 (23)
Mean daily minimum °F (°C)	49 (9)	52 (11)	55 (13)	60 (16)	67 (19)	72 (22)	73 (23)	73 (23)	73 (23)	68 (20)	60 (16)	53 (12)	63 (17)
Record low °F (°C)	17 (−8)	27 (−3)	25 (−4)	35 (2)	47 (8)	55 (13)	60 (16)	60 (16)	57 (14)	41 (5)	30 (−1)	21 (−6)	17 (−8)
Average precipitation inches (mm)	2.27 (58)	2.63 (67)	3.28 (83)	2.13 (54)	3.29 (84)	6.71 (170)	5.96 (151)	7.68 (195)	7.64 (194)	5.06 (129)	2.88 (73)	2.57 (65)	52.10 (1,323)

== Demographics ==
Historical population
Census	Pop.	Note	%±
1960	2,266		—
1970	3,050		34.6%
1980	5,078		66.5%
1990	8,399		65.4%
2000	9,824		17.0%
2010	18,355		86.8%
2020	25,924		41.2%
U.S. Decennial Census

=== Racial and ethnic composition ===
West Melbourne racial composition (Hispanics excluded from racial categories) (NH = Non-Hispanic)
Race	Pop 2010	Pop 2020	% 2010	% 2020
White (NH)	14,547	17,858	79.25%	68.89%
Black or African American (NH)	805	1,335	4.39%	5.15%
Native American or Alaska Native (NH)	36	62	0.20%	0.24%
Asian (NH)	904	1,924	4.93%	7.42%
Pacific Islander or Native Hawaiian (NH)	3	18	0.02%	0.07%
Some other race (NH)	38	186	0.21%	0.72%
Two or more races/Multiracial (NH)	369	1,320	2.01%	5.09%
Hispanic or Latino (any race)	1,653	3,221	9.01%	12.42%
Total	18,355	25,924		

=== 2020 census ===
As of the 2020 census, West Melbourne had a population of 25,924. The median age was 41.5 years. 20.8% of residents were under the age of 18 and 20.5% of residents were 65 years of age or older. For every 100 females there were 95.0 males, and for every 100 females age 18 and over there were 92.0 males age 18 and over.

99.9% of residents lived in urban areas, while 0.1% lived in rural areas.

There were 10,334 households in West Melbourne, of which 29.4% had children under the age of 18 living in them. Of all households, 51.8% were married-couple households, 17.8% were households with a male householder and no spouse or partner present, and 24.4% were households with a female householder and no spouse or partner present. About 26.8% of all households were made up of individuals and 12.0% had someone living alone who was 65 years of age or older.

There were 11,448 housing units, of which 9.7% were vacant. The homeowner vacancy rate was 2.0% and the rental vacancy rate was 12.8%.

Racial composition as of the 2020 census
Race	Number	Percent
White	18,681	72.1%
Black or African American	1,421	5.5%
American Indian and Alaska Native	95	0.4%
Asian	1,954	7.5%
Native Hawaiian and Other Pacific Islander	18	0.1%
Some other race	818	3.2%
Two or more races	2,937	11.3%
Hispanic or Latino (of any race)	3,221	12.4%

=== 2010 census ===
As of the 2010 United States census, there were 18,355 people, 6,923 households, and 4,598 families residing in the city.

=== 2000 census ===
As of the 2000 census, there were 9,824 people, 4,497 households, and 2,693 families residing in the city. The population density was 1,255.7 inhabitants per square mile (484.8/km^{2}). There were 4,874 housing units at an average density of 623.0 units per square mile (240.5 units/km^{2}). The racial makeup of the city was 93.68% White, 1.40% African American, 0.13% Native American, 2.08% Asian, 0.03% Pacific Islander, 1.21% from other races, and 1.47% from two or more races. Hispanic or Latino of any race were 3.84% of the population.

In 2000, there were 4,497 households, out of which 19.1% had children under the age of 18 living with them, 49.0% were married couples living together, 8.5% had a female householder with no husband present, and 40.1% were non-families. 34.0% of all households were made up of individuals, and 18.8% had someone living alone who was 65 years of age or older. The average household size was 2.08 and the average family size was 2.63.

In 2000, the population in the city was spread out, with 15.9% under the age of 18, 5.8% from 18 to 24, 24.2% from 25 to 44, 23.1% from 45 to 64, and 31.0% who were 65 years of age or older. The median age was 49 years. For every 100 females, there were 85.5 males. For every 100 females age 18 and over, there were 82.3 males.

== Education ==
West Melbourne served by the Brevard Public Schools.

Schools within West Melbourne include:

=== Elementary schools ===
- Meadowlane Primary/Intermediate Elementary
- West Melbourne Elementary School for Science
- Pineapple Cove Classical Academy (PCCA)

=== Middle school ===
- Central Middle School

=== Private schools ===
- Brevard Christian School
- Calvary Chapel Academy
- New Hope Lutheran Academy
- West Melbourne Christian Academy, K–12

== Economy ==
=== Personal income ===
In 2000, the median income for a household in the city was $37,391, and the median income for a family was $46,486. Males had a median income of $38,693 versus $27,040 for females. The per capita income for the city was $24,006. About 4.9% of families and 7.8% of the population were below the poverty line, including 9.9% of those under age 18 and 6.8% of those age 65 or over.

=== Workforce ===
In 2007, the average size of West Melbourne's labor force was 5,074. Of that group, 4,783 were employed and 291 were unemployed, for an unemployment rate of 5.7%.

=== Housing ===
In 2008, 83 building permits were issued. This was down from 174 permits in 2007, which was up from 142 permits in 2006.

The median home price in 2007 was $226,000.

== Infrastructure ==
=== Roads ===
- Interstate 95 – There is one exit in West Melbourne: Exit 180 (U.S. 192). The newer Exit 182 is nearby to West Melbourne, however.
- U.S. 192 – The main route through West Melbourne, locally known as New Haven Avenue. Almost all economic activity is located along this road. Major intersections include Interstate 95, CR 511, and CR 509.
- CR 509 – Locally known as Wickham Road north of U.S. 192 and Minton Road south of U.S. 192, this route forms a main transportation route through the south-central part of the county. Major intersections include U.S. 192 and Ellis Road.
- CR 511 – Locally known as John Rodes Parkway, this road is a non-freeway parallel to Interstate 95. Major intersections include U.S. 192 and Ellis Road.

=== Potable water ===
In 2017, West Melbourne residents were still purchasing their water from the utility owned by the neighboring City of Melbourne. It cost slightly over 1.1 cents per gallon, for a consumer of 3,000 US gallons (11,000 L; 2,500 imp gal) monthly. The city owns its underground network of conduits.

== Recreation ==
In January 2016, the Space Coast Field of Dreams opened to the public in the West Melbourne Community Park. In 2019, management of the Space Coast Field of Dreams's programs and operations was transferred to the City of West Melbourne.
