= Palm Bay, Florida =

City in Florida, United States

- City
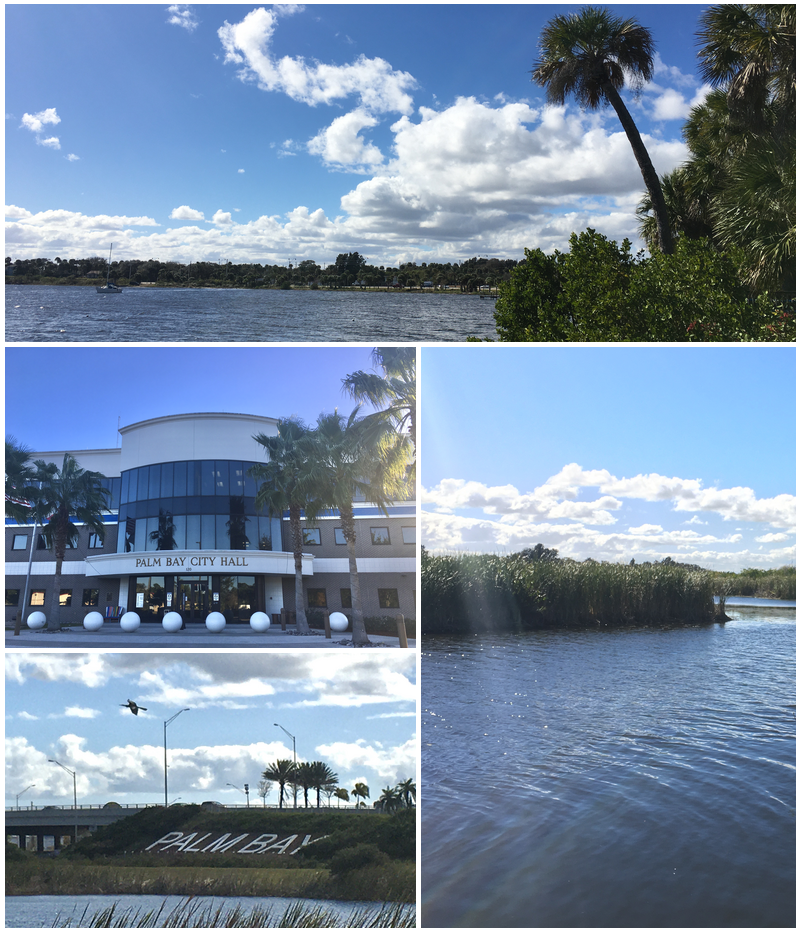
- From top (left to right): Palm Bay, Palm Bay City Hall, Palm Bay overpass sign on I-95, and Turkey Creek

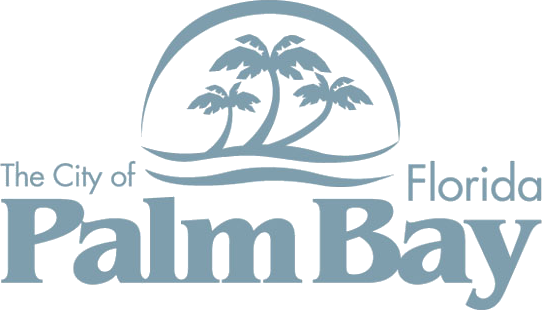
- Flag Seal
- Motto: "A perfect place to grow!"
- Location of Palm Bay in Brevard County (left) and in Florida (right)
- Coordinates: 27°59′50″N 80°40′12″W
- Country: United States
- State: Florida
- County: Brevard
- Settled (Tillman): c. Late 1870s
- Incorporated (City of Palm Bay): January 16, 1960

Government
  - Type: Council-Manager

Area
  - City: 89.60 sq mi (232.05 km^{2})
  - Land: 86.42 sq mi (223.82 km^{2})
  - Water: 3.18 sq mi (8.23 km^{2}) 4.56%
- Elevation: 23 ft (7.0 m)

Population (2020)
  - City: 119,760
  - Density: 1,385.8/sq mi (535.07/km^{2})
  - Urban: 510,675 (US: 82nd)
  - Urban density: 2,040/sq mi (787/km^{2})
  - Metro: 606,612 (US: 95th)
- Time zone: UTC−5 (Eastern (EST))
  - Summer (DST): UTC−4 (EDT)
- ZIP codes: 32905-32911
- Area code: 321
- FIPS code: 12-54000
- GNIS feature ID: 2404463
- Website: palmbayfl.gov

Palm Bay is a city in Brevard County, Florida, United States. The city's population was 119,760 at the 2020 United States census, up from 103,190 at the 2010 census, making it the most populous city in the county and the largest by land mass. The historic section of the city lies on the mouth of the Turkey Creek and the Palm Bay. Palm Bay has historically expanded south and to the west. The newer section is mostly situated west of Interstate 95 and south of the Tillman Canal.

Palm Bay is a principal city of the Palm Bay–Melbourne–Titusville, Florida Metropolitan Statistical Area, which had a population of 606,612 at the 2020 census.

== History ==
The Ais people, attracted to the mouth of Turkey Creek at the Indian River by freshwater springs, fish, oysters, and wildlife, are thought to have been the first inhabitants in the Palm Bay area.

The earliest place names for this area on early maps of the late 1700s were Turkey Creek, Elbow Creek and Crane Creek. An 1870 map of the Indian River by John Andrew Bostrom shows the area void of any settlements within about 15 miles of Turkey Creek. The first prominent European-American settler was John Tillman in the late 1870s. Tillman's wharf marked the mouth of Turkey Creek at what became known as Palm Bay on the Indian River.

By the late 1880s, Tillman was operating a profitable orange and banana grove on the north shore of the creek. He had the most notable banana grove on the Indian River. Tillman's wharf also attracted settlers, as it was a steamboat stop.

By the mid-19th century, there was a lumber operation, orange groves, and packing house. Growth was slow until the arrival of the railroad in 1894. Then goods were brought in and produce was shipped to market faster.

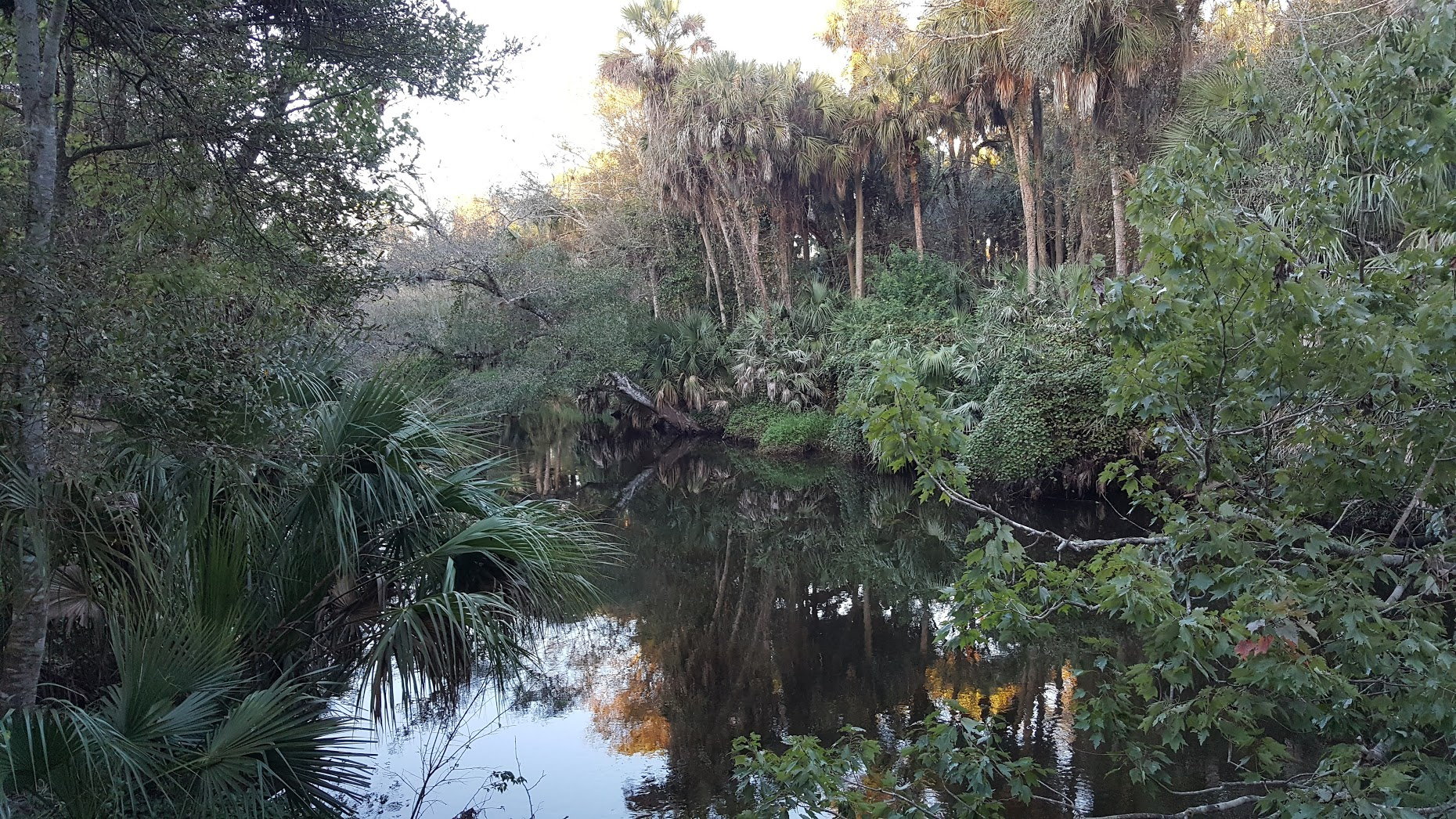
Turkey Creek in 2015

=== 1900s ===
Between 1910 and 1914, a land company known as the Indian River Catholic Colony became established at Tillman. Attempting to grow two crops a season, farmers quickly depleted the soil, and the colony failed. Those remaining built St. Joseph's Church on Miller Street, the oldest building still standing.

In the 1920s, the city was renamed as Palm Bay, after the bay bordered with sabal palm trees known as Palm Bay, located at the mouth of Turkey Creek. A group of Tillman businessmen established the Melbourne-Tillman Drainage District, and issued $1.5 million worth of bonds. Starting in 1922, a 180 miles (290 km) grid of 80 canals was dug to drain 40,000 acres (160 km^{2}) of swampy land west of Palm Bay for other uses. The canals made it possible to control flooding and redevelop marsh lands to agricultural use. These actions had the unintended consequences of leaving the land more vulnerable to flooding from storms and destroying important habitats for complex ecology.

Farmers planted citrus groves and truck farms which shipped winter produce by the Florida East Coast Railroad to northern markets. Farmers sold timber and land to paper companies. Based on use of the Tillman and Hopkins canals, ranchers raised beef cattle in West Melbourne.

In 1926, a fire among the dredges and a severe hurricane caused extensive damage, leading to an economic downturn in Palm Bay. The Melbourne-Tillman Drainage District went bankrupt.

In 1959, General Development Corporation purchased and platted extensive tracts of land in Palm Bay for a large residential project known as Port Malabar. The city of Palm Bay incorporated on January 16, 1960. Prior to expanding its borders, the city population was 2,808 that year.

The active development of the city after that point was intertwined with GDC, which laid out and built many of the streets, sold and built many of the city's homes, and built a water treatment plant. This was later purchased by the city of Palm Bay after GDC filed for bankruptcy in 1991.

The Melbourne-Tillman Water District was revived under the auspices of the County Government. In 2019, it controlled 100 square miles (260 km^{2}) of land.

On April 23, 1987, William Bryan Cruse Jr. shot and killed six people, including two college students and two police officers, at a local shopping center. He also wounded 10 other people. The shooting by the 59-year-old, who was retired or unemployed and caring for a chronically ill wife, made national news. Convicted and sentenced to death, Cruse died on Florida's death row in 2009.

In October 1994, $500,000 of gold and gems were stolen from a jewelry store which was, at the time, the largest single robbery in the city's history. Police suspected a connection with a similar robbery in May 1994 in Daytona Beach. Larry Lawton was charged in 1996 with the crime after fingerprint evidence linked him to the crime.

=== 2000s ===
For three consecutive years between 2003 and 2005, Palm Bay was a finalist for the All-America City Award.

In 2008, the city was named in an article from U.S. News & World Report as the second "Drunkest City" in the US behind Reno, Nevada.

In 2008, the former Port Malabar Country Club property was revalued at $300,000. This was considered an essentially "worthless" valuation because arsenic had been found in the groundwater and remediation would cost an estimated $12 million to clean up.

Hundreds of miles of roads in the city are in such poor condition that the city Public Works Department considers them unserviceable. The voters have consistently defeated measures to raise money to invest in infrastructure to improve the roads, which are described as the worst in Brevard County. In 2005, they voted down a $58.7 million bond measure. In 2009, they defeated a $75.2 million tax referendum. In 2010, voters living in areas with the worst roads voted 9–1 against $44.7 million assessment for repairing them. In 2011, the city government created a Palm Bay Road Maintenance District that they hope can levy taxes and alleviate the situation.

In 2008, fires on Mother's Day destroyed 37 homes in the southwest area of the city. Arson has been blamed as the cause of at least a few of the numerous fires. After the fires roared through the city, many roads and homes were left in disrepair for extended periods of time.

In 2009, the Brevard Zoo moved the remaining 15 Florida scrub jay families native to the city to Buck Lake Conservation Area in Mims. The Florida scrub jay is a threatened species due to it being territorial; it is unable to move to better grounds when its habitat is jeopardized.

=== 2010s ===
In 2010, plans were revealed by a private company to develop Emerald City, a large planned development within the city limits. The company intends to develop a multi-use, eco-friendly urban community to include residential zones consisting of townhouses, and commercial zones consisting of state-of-the-art medical facilities, research and development centers for technology firms, and urbanized retail shopping centers. As of February 2016, Emerald City is in the development phase.

City fiscal concern over firefighters' pensions rose during 2010. Firefighters' salaries averaged $71,100 annually plus $5,590 overtime pay. They were eligible for 100% of base pay after 28 years of service.

In 2012, construction began on the St. John's Heritage Parkway (also known as the Palm Bay Parkway), an arterial roadway that runs north to south along with the western limits of the city. A portion of the parkway opened to the public in 2015. The project was in development for more than a decade. It is intended to alleviate traffic for commuters on the main thoroughfares of SR 507, CR 509, and I-95. Later phases of the project will bring the roadway further south and then east following the lower city limits, eventually connecting to I-95 just north of Micco Road. A state roadway improvement project includes planned widening SR 507 (Babcock Street) from four lanes to six.

In 2015, the Harris Corporation constructed a new 464,000-square-foot technology center near Palm Bay Road and Troutman Boulevard. The building is one of the largest in the northeast section of the city and is reported to house approximately 1,400 scientists and engineers for the company.

In 2017, construction began on the southern Interstate 95 interchange and the southern portion of the St. John's Heritage Parkway. The Florida Department of Transportation (FDOT) is constructing a new diverging diamond interchange DDI on Interstate 95 just north of Micco Road within the city limits. The city is working on the southern portion of the parkway to extend from Babcock Street SE to Micco Road. The project is intended to improve traffic capacity, operations, and safety, as well as promote economic development in southern Brevard County.

The city formerly monitored some intersections with radar cameras, resulting in the issuing of traffic tickets to drivers who ran red lights. In 2013, these monitored intersections were found to be no safer than unmonitored ones. These cameras were removed in 2014.

In 2018, voters passed a referendum in the November 2018 elections, electing to fund a city-wide road repair project with a general obligation bond worth $150,000,000 payable from annual ad valorem taxes. Planning, design, and construction for the city's four quadrants are currently underway with a tentative 8-year plan projected. Construction of several units began in August 2019.

=== 2020s ===
In November 2023, Palm Bay was one of the hardest hit areas by flooding after 11 inches of rain fell in the city. Unofficial estimates state that southern Palm Bay received upwards of 20 inches of rain.

In November 2026, a 1-1000 year flood struck Palm Bay, triggering a flash flood emergency and killing two residents of the city.

== Geography ==
According to the United States Census Bureau, the city has a total area of 101.4 miles (101.4 mi), of which 97.86 miles (97.86 mi) is land and 3.1 square miles (8.1 km^{2}), or 4.56%, is water.

The city is often referred to in four quadrants: Northwest, Northeast, Southwest, and Southeast, each containing multiple zip codes. The most urban area is in Northeast. The most rural area is in Southwest, containing an area called The Compound. This area is home to Bombardier Recreational Products. “The compound” area is primarily used by recreational off road vehicles and persons engaging in various recreational activities.

During the early 1990s, Fred Poppe Regional Park (formerly Palm Bay Regional Park), a soccer and athletic complex in the western part of the city, was constructed. It is the largest of a citywide system of parks and recreation areas. The Turkey Creek Sanctuary is a small nature reserve in the northeast part of the city.

=== Climate ===
The climate in this area is characterized by hot, humid summers and generally mild winters. According to the Köppen climate classification, the City of Palm Bay has a humid subtropical climate zone (Cfa).

Climate data for Palm Bay, Florida, 1991–2020 normals, extremes 2000–present
Month	Jan	Feb	Mar	Apr	May	Jun	Jul	Aug	Sep	Oct	Nov	Dec	Year
Record high °F (°C)	88 (31)	90 (32)	94 (34)	97 (36)	98 (37)	101 (38)	105 (41)	100 (38)	96 (36)	96 (36)	92 (33)	89 (32)	105 (41)
Mean maximum °F (°C)	83.3 (28.5)	85.6 (29.8)	88.8 (31.6)	90.8 (32.7)	93.4 (34.1)	95.5 (35.3)	96.4 (35.8)	96.6 (35.9)	94.4 (34.7)	92.2 (33.4)	86.8 (30.4)	84.9 (29.4)	97.9 (36.6)
Mean daily maximum °F (°C)	72.9 (22.7)	75.4 (24.1)	78.5 (25.8)	82.8 (28.2)	86.6 (30.3)	89.9 (32.2)	91.3 (32.9)	91.8 (33.2)	89.2 (31.8)	84.9 (29.4)	79.0 (26.1)	74.6 (23.7)	83.1 (28.4)
Daily mean °F (°C)	61.0 (16.1)	63.5 (17.5)	66.5 (19.2)	71.4 (21.9)	76.0 (24.4)	80.3 (26.8)	82.0 (27.8)	82.3 (27.9)	80.4 (26.9)	75.7 (24.3)	68.8 (20.4)	63.5 (17.5)	72.6 (22.6)
Mean daily minimum °F (°C)	49.0 (9.4)	51.5 (10.8)	54.5 (12.5)	60.0 (15.6)	65.4 (18.6)	70.7 (21.5)	72.6 (22.6)	72.8 (22.7)	71.5 (21.9)	66.5 (19.2)	58.5 (14.7)	52.3 (11.3)	62.1 (16.7)
Mean minimum °F (°C)	33.0 (0.6)	35.4 (1.9)	39.0 (3.9)	49.8 (9.9)	56.3 (13.5)	66.9 (19.4)	68.9 (20.5)	70.5 (21.4)	67.0 (19.4)	52.1 (11.2)	44.4 (6.9)	39.2 (4.0)	31.2 (−0.4)
Record low °F (°C)	23 (−5)	27 (−3)	30 (−1)	40 (4)	46 (8)	64 (18)	64 (18)	67 (19)	57 (14)	41 (5)	36 (2)	25 (−4)	23 (−5)
Average precipitation inches (mm)	2.64 (67)	2.42 (61)	3.04 (77)	2.81 (71)	4.37 (111)	7.62 (194)	6.58 (167)	7.11 (181)	7.95 (202)	5.60 (142)	2.95 (75)	2.46 (62)	55.55 (1,411)
Source: NOAA (mean maxima/minima 2006–2020)

=== Surrounding areas ===
- St. Johns River; Sawgrass Lake; Lake Hell 'n Blazes; Osceola County
- Grant-Valkaria; Malabar; Indian River Lagoon
- West Melbourne; Melbourne
- Indian River County

== Demographics ==
Historical population
Census	Pop.	Note	%±
1960	2,808		—
1970	7,176		155.6%
1980	18,560		158.6%
1990	62,632		237.5%
2000	79,413		26.8%
2010	103,190		29.9%
2020	119,760		16.1%
U.S. Decennial Census

=== 2010 and 2020 census ===
Palm Bay, Florida – Racial and ethnic composition Note: the US Census treats Hispanic/Latino as an ethnic category. This table excludes Latinos from the racial categories and assigns them to a separate category. Hispanics/Latinos may be of any race.
Race / ethnicity (NH = Non-Hispanic)	Pop 2000	Pop 2010	Pop 2020	% 2000	% 2010	% 2020
White (NH)	60,549	65,967	67,826	76.25%	63.93%	56.63%
Black or African American (NH)	8,634	17,590	20,426	10.87%	17.05%	17.06%
Native American or Alaska Native (NH)	241	349	286	0.30%	0.34%	0.24%
Asian (NH)	1,325	1,789	2,273	1.67%	1.73%	1.90%
Pacific Islander or Native Hawaiian (NH)	32	50	84	0.04%	0.05%	0.07%
Some other race (NH)	196	331	902	0.25%	0.32%	0.75%
Mixed race or Multiracial (NH)	1,586	2,542	6,527	2.00%	2.46%	5.45%
Hispanic or Latino (any race)	6,850	14,572	21,436	8.63%	14.12%	17.90%
Total	79,413	103,190	119,760	100.00%	100.00%	100.00%

As of the 2020 United States census, there were 119,760 people, 39,109 households, and 26,872 families residing in the city.

As of the 2010 United States census, there were 103,190 people, 36,940 households, and 26,528 families residing in the city.

=== 2000 census ===
As of 2000, 34.0% had children under the age of 18 living with them, 55.0% were married couples living together, 12.2% had a female householder with no husband present, and 28.2% are non-families. 21.8% of all households were made up of individuals, and 8.3% had someone living alone who was 65 years of age or older. The average household size was 2.60 and the average family size was 3.03.

In 2000, the city's population was spread out, with 26.5% under the age of 18, 7.6% from 18 to 24, 29.6% from 25 to 44, 21.5% from 45 to 64, and 14.7% who were 65 years of age or older. The median age was 37 years. For every 100 females, there were 95.2 males. For every 100 females age 18 and over, there were 91.4 males.

In 2000, the median income for a household in the city was $36,508, and the median income for a family was $41,636. Males had a median income of $31,060 versus $22,203 for females. The per capita income for the city was $16,992. 9.5% of the population and 7.1% of families were below the poverty line. Out of the total people living in poverty, 11.5% were under the age of 18 and 8.1% were 65 or older.

=== Languages ===
As of 2000, English spoken as a first language accounted for 88.55% of all residents, while 11.44% spoke other languages as their first language. The most significant was Spanish speakers who made up 7.45% of the population.

== Economy ==
=== Industry ===
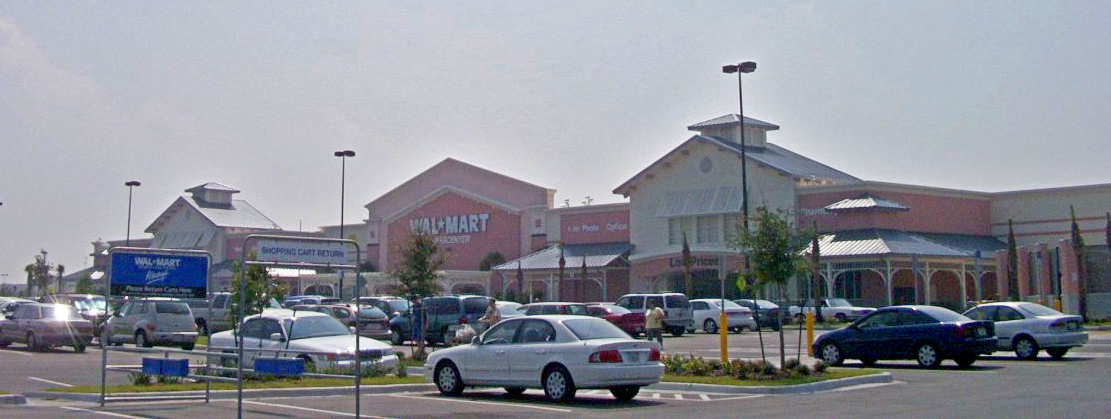
Pink Wal-Mart Supercenter built in 2005: the city uses Key West vernacular architecture.

Forbes magazine ranked the city the 11th most innovative in the nation in 2010.

Large employers in the city include:

- L3Harris Technologies has 3,400 employees on its Palm Bay campus on Palm Bay Road
- Intersil employed 700 people in 2010
- Palm Bay Hospital

=== Workforce ===
In 2007, the average size of Palm Bay's labor force was 49,935. Of that group, 47,542 were employed and 2,393 were unemployed, for an unemployment rate of 4.8%. This figure had risen to 6,571 (12.7%) and was the highest rate in the county.

=== Tourism ===
The city has some frequently visited recreational locations, such as the area known as "the compound" and the Turkey Creek area. The city has a riverfront area that the city government is attempting to further develop and focus on.

The 2015 Tough Mudder 12.5 miles (20.1 km) race drew 9,875 visitors to the area including 6,835 participants. The Brevard County Tourist Development Council spent $40,000 promoting and staging the event.

== Government ==
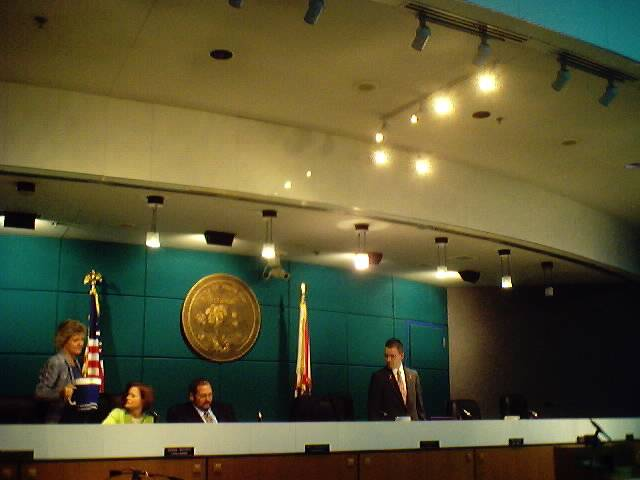
Members of the Palm Bay city government in 2003

Palm Bay utilizes the council-manager form of government.

The Mayor and City Council are the legislative branch of city government; its members are the community's decision makers. The Mayor is the presiding officer at the Council Meetings and is the official head of the city for all ceremonial occasions. Power is centralized in the elected Mayor and Council (City Council), which approves the budget, determines the tax rate, focuses on the community's goals, major projects, and such long-term considerations as community growth, land use development, capital improvement plans, capital financing, and strategic planning.

In Palm Bay, a five-member Mayor and Council, operate in accordance with the City Charter. Three positions created by the Charter (Charter Officers) are appointed by and report directly to the City Council: City Manager, City Attorney, and City Clerk.

The City Manager is responsible for all activities related to the operations of the city. The City Manager hires a professional staff to assist in the administration and enforcement of the City Charter, ordinances, resolutions, financial conditions and all of the various procedures and policies that are required for the city to function properly. In 2025, the annual salary of the city manager was $252,000. The office of Mayor receives an annual salary of $0.20 per capita while council members receive $0.10 per capita.

As of 2025, the city is represented by the following people:

- Mayor – Rob Medina
- Deputy Mayor – Mike Jaffe
- Councilmembers – Kenny Johnson, Chandler Langevin, and Mike Hammer
- City Manager – Matthew Morton
- City Attorney – Patricia D Smith
- City Clerk – Terese Jones

In 2010, the city opened a data base to the public, that tracks city income and expenditures.

In 2010, the city employed 913 full-time equivalent workers.

In 2008, the police department won an award for training patrolmen to properly collect DNA samples. At the time, they were the only police force in the world with this program.

In 2007, the city had a taxable real estate base of $5.84 billion. This amount was the largest of any municipality in the county.

=== Utilities Department ===
In 2009, the utilities department had 545 miles (877 km) of water lines, 300 miles (480 km) of sewer lines, 2,250 fire hydrants, and 120 full-time equivalent employees.

== Public safety ==
=== Police Department ===
The City of Palm Bay Police Department is authorized 206 sworn police officers, in addition to numerous civilian and support personnel. The police agency is broken into various sections, such as the Uniform Services Division, Support Services Division, and the Criminal Investigations Division. Each section assigns officers to various tasks, such as patrol, traffic enforcement, training officers, detectives, and similar tasks. There are three police districts within the city. Police officers are assigned to each district.

A 2009 survey indicated that the city was ranked 263 out of 400 in crime statistics, with #1 being the worst. Crimes included murder, rape, robbery, aggravated assault, burglary, and motor vehicle theft.

In 2011, Skype was used 32 times to obtain warrants promptly.

=== Fire Department ===
Palm Bay Fire Rescue consists of 161 firefighters and seven stations. Most firefighters work 24 hour shifts followed by 48 hours off. The Palm Bay Fire Department responded to 18,777 calls in 2023 (ESO Ad-Hoc Data).

The fire department operates from 6 fire stations.

- Fire Station 1 assigned units – Engine 1, Truck 1, Squad 1, District Chief 1, Brush 21, TRT 1, and TRT Trailer.
- Fire Station 2 assigned units – Engine 2, Squad 2, District Chief 2, Brush 2, and Air 2.
- Fire Station 3 assigned units – Engine 3, Tender 3 and Brush 3.
- Fire Station 4 assigned units – Engine 4, Tender 4 and Brush 4.
- Fire Station 5 assigned units – Engine 5, Tender 5 and Brush 5.
- Fire Station 6 assigned units – Engine 6 and Brush 6.

In May 2008 (Mothers Day Fires), a wild fire was started that burned a total of almost 26,000 acres (11,000 ha)—40 square miles (100 km^{2}), 30 homes were destroyed and 140 were damaged. Firefighters from Palm Bay and across the state fought the fires around the clock.

In 2013, the city concluded an agreement with the county to furnish fire and emergency medical aid to whichever governmental unit was closer to the problem: a Palm Bay unit or a Brevard County unit.

On September 13, 2024, Palm Bay Fire Rescue held a groundbreaking ceremony for Fire Station 7 located in the northeast section of the city. This new fire station will be able to accommodate future growth in the department. Response times will be decreased with the addition of fire station 7. A ladder truck and squad will be assigned to fire station 7. Currently, there are plans for temporary fire stations located in the northwest (Fire Station 8) and the southeast (Fire Station 9). These fire stations are needed to align with current and projected growth in the city.

== Education ==
All public schools are run by the Brevard County School Board.

Public Elementary Schools:

- Discovery Elementary School
- Christa McAuliffe Elementary School
- Columbia Elementary School
- John F. Turner Sr. Elementary School
- Jupiter Elementary School
- Lockmar Elementary School
- Palm Bay Elementary School
- Port Malabar Elementary School
- Riviera Elementary School
- Sunrise Elementary School
- Westside Elementary School

Public Middle School:

- Southwest Middle School

Public High Schools:

- Bayside High School
- Palm Bay High School (located in Melbourne, but serves Palm Bay and Malabar)
- Heritage High School

Higher Education:

- Eastern Florida State College

== Transportation ==
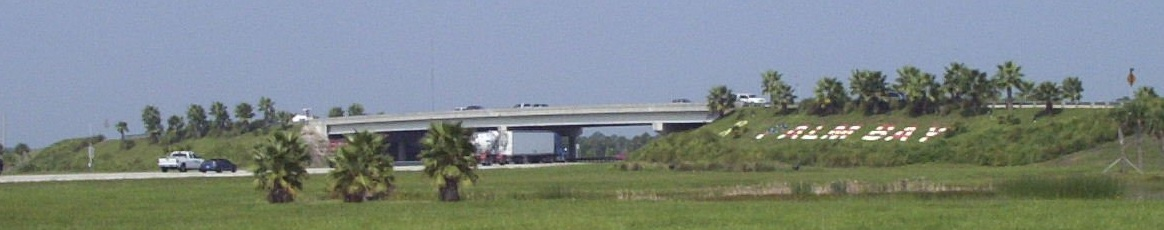
City name marker erected on I-95 in 2002

Major roads in Palm Bay include the following:

- I-95 (SR 9 / Interstate 95) – The major freeway serving the East Coast of the United States runs northwest to southeast through the center of the city's area. The city is served by interchanges 166 (St. Johns Heritage Parkway), 173 (Malabar Road), and 176 (Palm Bay Road).
- US 1 (SR 5 / Dixie Highway) – This road serves the northeastern section of the city. It is intersected by three main roads: Port Malabar Boulevard, Robert J. Conlan Boulevard and Palm Bay Road.
- SR 507 (Babcock Street) – The state road portion of Babcock Street runs through the northeastern portion of Palm Bay. It provides a route from Melbourne, just north of the city, to Malabar Road and County Road 507. Main intersections include CR 516, Port Malabar Boulevard, and SR 514.
- CR 507 (Babcock Street) – The county road portion of Babcock Street runs through the extreme southeast portion of Palm Bay. It provides a direct route to Fellsmere in Indian River County from Brevard County. Main intersections include SR 514, Waco Boulevard, Valkaria Road/Wyoming Drive, Grant Road/Eldron Boulevard, and Cogan Drive.
- SR 514 (Malabar Road) – The state road portion of Malabar Road connects the town of Malabar, which gives its name to the road, to eastern Palm Bay and I-95. The only main intersections are Interstate 95 and SR 507.
- CR 514 (Malabar Road) – The county road portion of Malabar Road runs through the center of Palm Bay to CR 509. The City Hall, the Police Department and the main economic center of Palm Bay are all located on this road. Major intersections include Interstate 95, San Filippo Drive, Emerson Drive, Eldron Boulevard and CR 509.
- CR 516 (Palm Bay Road) – This road serves the extreme northern part of Palm Bay, mainly the northeastern portion. It runs from SR 507 to CR 509. Major intersections include SR 507, Port Malabar Boulevard, Dairy Road, Hollywood Boulevard, Interstate 95, and CR 509.
- CR 509 (Minton Road) – This road serves the western part of Palm Bay. It runs from West Melbourne to Malabar Road. Major intersections include CR 516, Emerson Drive, Americana Boulevard, and CR 514.

There are about 851 miles (1,370 km) of city-maintained highways. Most roads in the area west of DeGroodt Road are unpaved. In 2013, the public works director reported that most roads in south Palm Bay were "failed roads," for lack of maintenance.

In 2012, Palm Bay had the lowest walkability of any city in the United States with a population over 100,000 people.

In 2018, The city's voters approved a bond referendum to pave the city's failing roadways. The city is repaving or reconstructing various sections or units each fiscal year.

== Notable people ==
- William G. Bainbridge, 5th Sergeant Major of the Army
- Deanne Bell, reality television show host known for PBS's Design Squad and Discovery Channel's Smash Lab
- Xavier Carter, professional track athlete
- Joe Cohen, San Francisco 49ers defensive tackle
- Bobby Dall, bassist musician of Poison
- Ray Dandridge, Hall of Fame Baseball player, retired and died in Palm Bay in 1994
- Ezio Flagello, Italian-American opera singer
- David Gewirtz, CNN columnist, cyberterrorism advisor, presidential scholar
- Chris Heston, San Francisco Giants pitcher
- Cameron Long (born 1988), basketball player in the Israeli Premier League
- Reggie Nelson, professional football player
- Joe Pan, author, publisher
