= List of places in Florida: T-V =

This list of current cities, towns, unincorporated communities, counties, and other recognized places in the U.S. state of Florida also includes information on the number and names of counties in which the place lies, and its lower and upper zip code bounds, if applicable.

Name of place	Number of counties	Counties	Lower zip code	Upper zip code
Tacoma	1	Alachua	32667	
Taft	1	Orange	32824	
Tahitian Gardens	1	Pasco	33589	
Taintsville	1	Seminole		
Tallahassee	1	Leon	32301	17
Tallavast	1	Manatee		
Tallevast	1	Manatee	34270	
Talleyrand	1	Duval	32226	
Tamarac	1	Broward	33309	
Tamiami	1	Miami-Dade	33144	
Tampa	1	Hillsborough	33601	97
Tampa Reservation	1	Hillsborough		
Tancrede	1	Polk		
Tangelo Park	1	Orange	32809	
Tangerine	1	Orange	32777	
Tanglewood	1	Lee		
Tang-O-Mar Beach	1	Walton	32541	
Tara	1	Manatee		
Tarpon	1	Hillsborough		
Tarpon Point	1	Sarasota		
Tarpon Springs	1	Pinellas	34688	91
Tarrytown	1	Sumter	33597	
Tarzan	1	Escambia		
Tatum	1	Sarasota		
Tavares	1	Lake	32778	
Tavernier	1	Monroe	33070	
Taylor	1	Baker	32087	
Taylor Creek	1	Okeechobee		
Tedder	1	Broward		
Tee and Green Estates	1	Charlotte	33950	
Telegraph Estates	1	Lee		
Telogia	1	Liberty	32360	
Tels	1	Polk		
Temple Crest	1	Hillsborough		
Temple Terrace	1	Hillsborough	33687	
Temple Terrace Junction	1	Hillsborough		
Tencor	1	Polk		
Tendil Crossing	1	Holmes		
Tenile	1	Escambia		
Tennille	1	Taylor	32356	
Tenoroc	1	Polk		
Tensulate	1	Duval	32222	
Tequesta	1	Palm Beach	33469	
Terra Ceia	1	Manatee	34250	
Terra Mana	1	Manatee		
Terra Mar	1	Broward		
Terrytown	1	Palm Beach		
The Acreage	1	Palm Beach		
The Cove	1	Broward		
The Crossings	1	Miami-Dade		
The Fountains	1	Palm Beach		
The Hammocks	1	Miami-Dade		
The Jungle	1	Pinellas		
The Lakes	1	Broward		
The Landings	1	Lee		
The Meadows	1	Sarasota		
The Pines	1	Miami-Dade		
Theressa	1	Bradford	32091	
The Roads	1	Miami-Dade		
The Villages	1	Sumter		
Thomas City	1	Jefferson	32344	
Thompson	1	Citrus		
Thompson	1	Monroe	33070	
Thonotosassa	1	Hillsborough	33592	
Three Lakes	1	Miami-Dade		
Three Oaks	1	Lee		
Thunderbird	1	Lee	33901	
Tice	1	Lee	33905	
Tidewater	1	Levy		
Tierra Verde	1	Pinellas	33715	
Tiger Bay	1	Polk		
Tiger Point	1	Santa Rosa	32561	
Tildenville	1	Orange	32787	
Tilton	1	Franklin		
Timber Pines	1	Hernando		
Tisonia	1	Duval	32218	
Titusville	1	Brevard	32780	96
Titusville Beach	1	Brevard		
Tocoi	1	St. Johns		
Tocoi Junction	1	St. Johns	32033	
Tolson	1	Polk		
Tommytown	1	Pasco		
Tomoka Estates	1	Volusia	32074	
Torch Key	1	Monroe		
Toronto	1	Orange		
Torrey	1	Hardee	33834	
Towers	1	Orange	32789	
Town and Country Plaza	1	Escambia	32505	
Towne Mall	1	Broward	33317	
Town 'n' Country	1	Hillsborough	33615	
Town Park Estates	1	Miami-Dade		
Townsend	1	Lafayette	32013	
Trail Center	1	Lafayette		
Trailer City	1	Leon	32301	
Trailer Estates	1	Manatee	34281	
Trailer Haven	1	Brevard	32901	
Trailside	1	Palm Beach	33436	
Trailtown	1	Collier		
Tranquility Park	1	Polk	33880	
Trapnell	1	Hillsborough	33566	
Traxler	1	Alachua		
Treasure Hill Park	1	Escambia		
Treasure Island	1	Miami-Dade	33141	
Treasure Island	1	Pinellas	33740	
Trenton	1	Gilchrist	32693	
Triangle	1	Lake	32757	
Triangle Acres	1	Lake	32757	
Trilacoochee	1	Pasco		
Trilby	1	Pasco	33593	
Trinity	1	Pasco		
Tri Par Estates	1	Sarasota	33577	
Tristan Village	1	Escambia		
Tropic	1	Brevard	32962	
Tropic	1	Indian River	32962	
Tropical Gulf Acres	1	Charlotte	33950	
Tropical Park	1	Miami-Dade		
Tropical Shores Manor	1	Lake	32778	
Tropicanna Mobile Manor	1	Lee	33901	
Tropic Heights	1	Charlotte	33950	
Tropic Isle	1	Palm Beach	33444	
Truckland	1	Lee		
Tuckers Corner	1	Charlotte		
Tully	1	Wakulla		
Tungroc	1	Alachua		
Turkey Creek	1	Hillsborough	33566	
Turkey Foot	1	Collier		
Turkey Point	1	Miami-Dade		
Turkeytown	1	Levy		
Turnbull	1	Brevard		
Turner River	1	Collier	33943	
Tuscannoga	1	Lake	32736	
Tuskawilla	1	Seminole		
Twentymile	1	St. Johns		
Twenty Mile Bend	1	Palm Beach		
Twin Lake	1	Hillsborough	33604	
Twin Lakes	1	Broward		
Twin Palms	1	Lee	33901	
Twin Pole	1	Liberty		
Two Egg	1	Jackson	32423	
Tyler	1	Gilchrist		
Tyndall Air Force Base	1	Bay	32403	
Tyrone	1	Pinellas		
Uceta	1	Hillsborough		
Uceta Yard	1	Hillsborough		
Uleta	1	Miami-Dade	33162	
Ulmerton	1	Pinellas		
Umatilla	1	Lake	32784	
Union	1	Walton		
Union City	1	Jackson		
Union Park	1	Orange	32817	
United	1	Palm Beach		
University	1	Alachua	32603	
University	1	Duval	32216	
University	1	Hillsborough	33620	
University	1	Orange		
University of Miami	1	Miami-Dade	33124	
University of South Florida	1	Hillsborough	33620	
University of Tampa	1	Hillsborough	33606	
University of West Florida	1	Escambia	32514	
University Park	1	Duval	32211	
University Park	1	Miami-Dade	33124	
University Park	1	Orange		
University Park	1	Palm Beach		
University West	1	Hillsborough	33620	
Upper Grand Lagoon	1	Bay		
Upper Key Largo	1	Monroe	33037	
Upper Sugarloaf Key	1	Monroe		
Upthegrove Beach	1	Okeechobee		
USAF Hospital	1	Okaloosa	32542	
Useppa Island	1	Lee	33921	
Usher	1	Levy		
Usina Beach	1	St. Johns		
Utopia	1	Broward		
Utopia	1	Sarasota		
Valdez	1	Volusia		
Valkaria	1	Brevard	32949	
Valley Church	1	Walton	32433	
Valparaiso	1	Okaloosa	32580	
Valrico	1	Hillsborough	33594	
Vamo	1	Sarasota	33580	
Vanderbilt	1	Collier		
Vanderbilt Beach	1	Collier		
Vanderbilt Beach Estates	1	Collier		
Vanderbilt Park	1	Miami-Dade		
Vandolah	1	Hardee		
Varnes	1	Union		
Vaughn	1	Palm Beach		
Venetia	1	Duval	32230	
Venetian Gardens	1	Sarasota	33555	
Venetian Islands	1	Miami-Dade	33139	
Venetia Terrace	1	Duval		
Venice	1	Sarasota	34284	93
Venice Beach	1	Sarasota	34285	
Venice Beach Park	1	Sarasota	33595	
Venice East	1	Sarasota		
Venice Gardens	1	Sarasota	33595	
Venice Groves	1	Sarasota		
Venice South	1	Sarasota	33595	
Ventura	1	Orange	32822	
Venus	1	Highlands	33960	
Verdie	1	Nassau	32009	
Vereen	1	Wakulla		
Vermont Heights	1	St. Johns	32033	
Verna	1	Manatee	33551	
Vernon	1	Washington	32462	
Vero Beach	1	Indian River	32960	68
Vero Beach Highlands	1	Indian River	32960	
Vero Beach South	1	Indian River	32960	
Vero Lake Estates	1	Indian River	32960	
Verona Walk	1	Collier		
Vero Shores	1	Indian River	32960	
Vertagreen	1	Polk		
Vicksburg	1	Bay	32401	
Victor	1	Pinellas		
Victory Gardens	1	Miami-Dade	33170	
Viera	1	Brevard		
Viera East	1	Brevard		
Viera West	1	Brevard		
Viking	1	St. Lucie		
Vilano Beach	1	St. Johns	32084	
Vilas	1	Liberty	32351	
Villa Del Ray	1	Palm Beach		
Village Green	1	Alachua	32601	
Village Green	1	Brevard	32955	
Village of Charlie Creek	1	Hardee		
Village of Golf	1	Palm Beach	33436	
Village Park	1	Broward		
Villager	1	Palm Beach	33435	
Villages of Oriole	1	Palm Beach		
Villa Rica	1	Palm Beach	33432	
Villas	1	Lee		
Villa Sabine	1	Escambia	32561	
Villa Tasso	1	Walton		
Vineland	1	Orange	32787	
Vineyards	1	Collier		
Virginia Gardens	1	Miami-Dade	33166	
Virginia Village	1	Clay		
Vista	1	Levy		
Vitis	1	Pasco	33599	
Volusia	1	Volusia		

== See also ==
- Florida
- List of municipalities in Florida
- List of former municipalities in Florida
- List of counties in Florida
- List of census-designated places in Florida
