= Luther F. Tilden =

Florida pioneer (1834–1929)

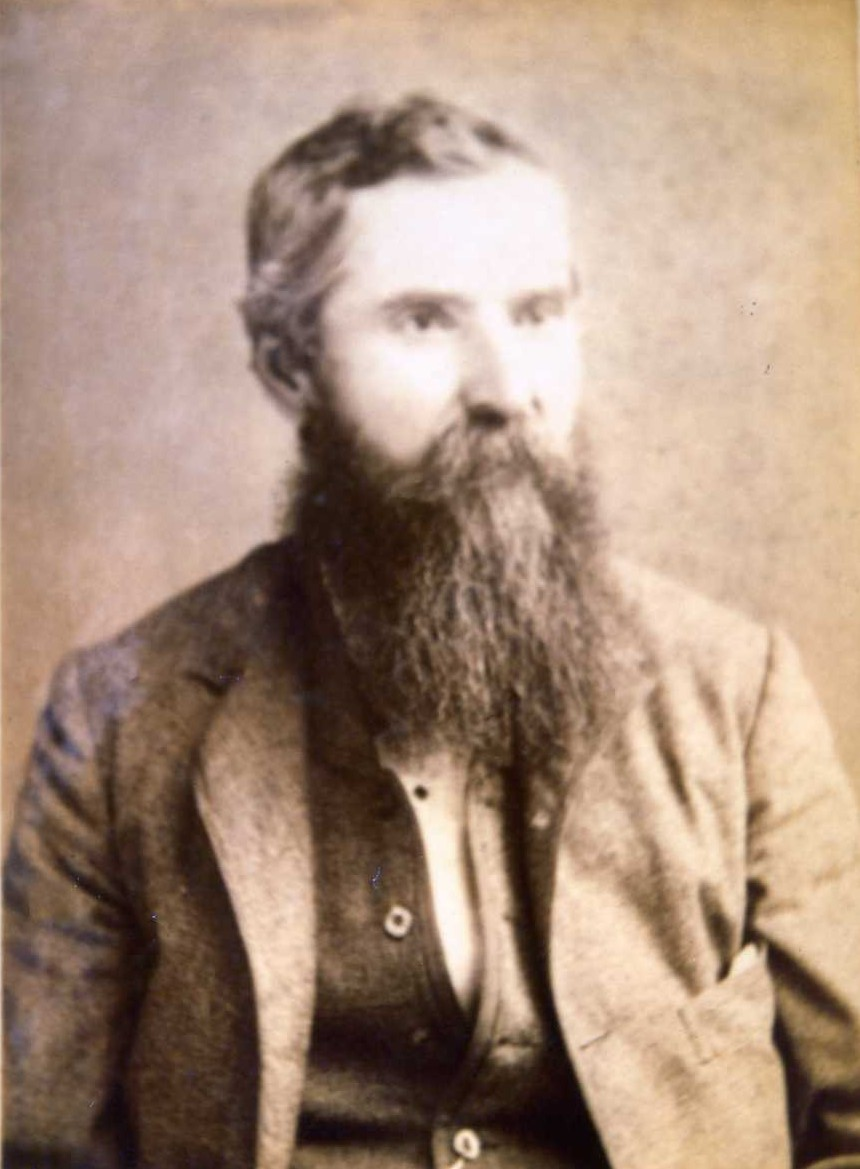
- Born: August 10, 1834; Cornwall, Vermont
- Died: March 28, 1929 (age 94); Tildenville, Florida
- Known for: Prominent farmer and citizen in West Orange County, Florida
- Spouse: Emily Aurora Tilden
- Children: 4

Luther Fuller Tilden (1834-1929) was a pioneer, community leader, and cultural icon of western Orange County, Florida. Tilden owned large tracts of land south of Lake Apopka, where his family's farms and properties were a sizeable portion of the economy. The area around his property came to be known as Tildenville, sandwiched between the towns of Winter Garden and Oakland. His family is a branch of the larger Tylden Family.

== Early life ==
Luther Fuller Tilden was born on August 10, 1834, in Cornwall, Vermont. In his early childhood Luther's father, Isaac Tilden, moved the family to Upstate New York. At the age of 18, Luther's father died, leaving him with an inheritance that he then sold to his older brother. Upon doing so, Tilden left New York for Illinois, settling in Vienna. Illinois pleased Tilden to an extent that he wrote his family in New York, successfully urging them to follow him west. Tilden married and saw the birth of the first three of his children in Illinois.

== Pioneering and Community Service ==
Tilden lived in Vienna, Illinois, for just over two decades before being diagnosed with bronchitis in 1875. The doctor that diagnosed Tilden urged him to move south to a warmer climate; the doctor believed warm weather alleviates lung symptoms. Immediately, Tilden sought a home in the south and began scouting for places to settle in Florida. He decided to settle on the southern shore of Lake Apopka. Yet again, the entire Tilden family, as well as his in-laws, went along with the move.

Tilden began agricultural pursuits, quickly becoming one of the most successful farmers in the area. Perhaps the reason for his success was packaging; in those times, crops were packaged poorly or not at all, but Tilden insisted his produce be properly packed. At first, tomatoes were his primary crop. In the proceeding years, citrus became an economic centerpiece of Central Florida and Tilden reconfigured his farms to cultivate it.

In 1894 and 1895, the Great Freeze killed many of the citrus trees in Florida, forcing many settlers to leave. Tilden provided support in the form of loans, equipment, and temporary use of his animals for those who lost their livelihoods in the disaster.

He contributed to various western Orange County institutions, usually by donating land and money or leading them himself. For instance, Lakeview Middle School and the Presbyterian Church of Oakland both sit on land donated by Tilden. The Bank of Winter Garden is an example of a local organization headed by Tilden.

By the end of his life, he was revered by the communities of Oakland, Winter Garden, and Tildenville as "West Orange's Grandest Old Man". Reportedly, he continued to drive a Cadillac around town into his 90s.

== Legacies ==
The National Register of Historic Places designated a house that Tilden built for his son as a historic place.

A street in Winter Garden is named for the Tilden family.

Tilden and his family were honored in a Winter Garden Heritage Foundation exhibit in 2022.

Tildenville, a Census-designated Place, still bears his name. Various local businesses and institutions use the name, such as Tildenville Elementary School.

Many histories of West Orange County acknowledge the impact Tilden and his family had on the local economy and culture. Examples include, Oakland - The Early Years by Eve Bacon, History of Orange County Florida by William Blackman, and My Darlings: A Memoir by Grace Mather-Smith.
