= Tidewater =

Tidewater may refer to:

- Tidewater (region), a geographic area of southeast Virginia, southern Maryland, and northeast North Carolina.
  - Tidewater accent, an accent of American English associated with the Tidewater region of Virginia
- Tidewater glacier, a classification of glacier
- Tidewater (marine services), a company providing marine services to the offshore petroleum industry
- Tidewater Middle East Co., an Iranian port operator company that belongs to IRGC
- Tidewater (Amtrak train), a former passenger train in Virginia
- Tidewater, Oregon, a settlement
- Tidewater Petroleum, a former name of Getty Oil
- Tidewater architecture, a style of architecture found mostly in coastal areas of the Southern United States
- Tidelands, an area affected by the tide
- Tidewater, Florida, a place in Florida
- Tidewater (marketing), a term used by industries and governments
- Tidewater cypress, the bald cypress (Taxodium distichum)

== See also ==
- Tidelands (TV series)
