= Winter Garden Downtown Historic District =

Historic district in Florida, United States

- U.S. National Register of Historic Places
- U.S. Historic district
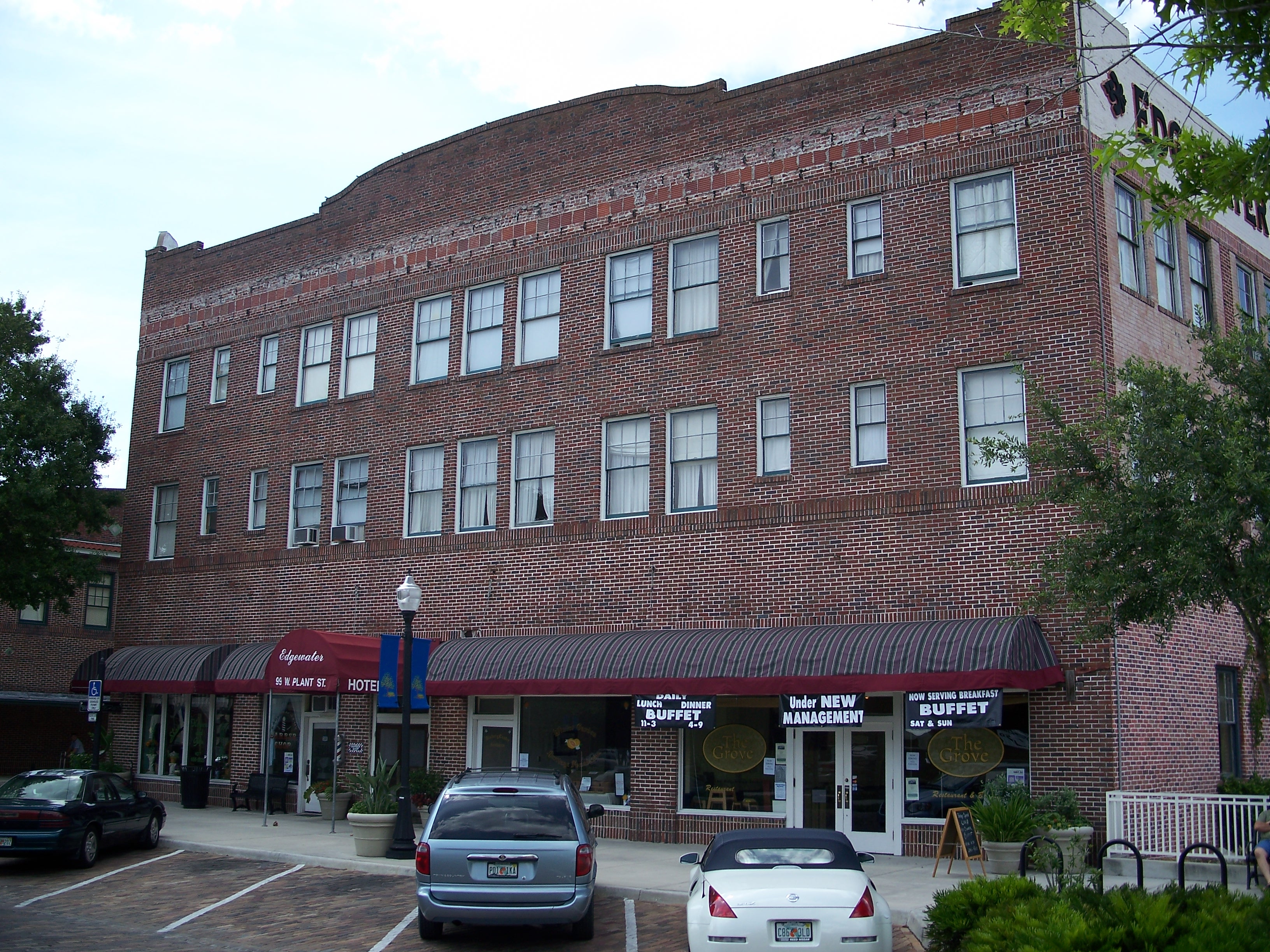

- Location within Florida Location within the United States
- Location: Winter Garden, Florida
- Coordinates: 28°33′56″N 81°35′8″W
- Area: 100 acres (0.40 km^{2})
- Architectural style: Classical Revival, Other
- NRHP reference No.: 96000850
- Added to NRHP: August 1, 1996

The Winter Garden Downtown Historic District is a U.S. historic district in Winter Garden, Florida. It is bounded by Woodland, Tremaine, Henderson, and Lakeview Streets, encompasses approximately 100 acres (0.40 km^{2}), and contains 26 historic buildings. Among the 26 buildings are the Winter Garden Heritage Museum, Garden Theatre, Tony's Liquors, the Dillard & Boyd Building, and many more. The oldest confirmed of these are the Dillard & Boyd Building and 36 W. Plant Street, both dating to 1912 (there are some buildings which may be older, however sources cannot confirm their date of construction). On August 1, 1996, it was added to the U.S. National Register of Historic Places.

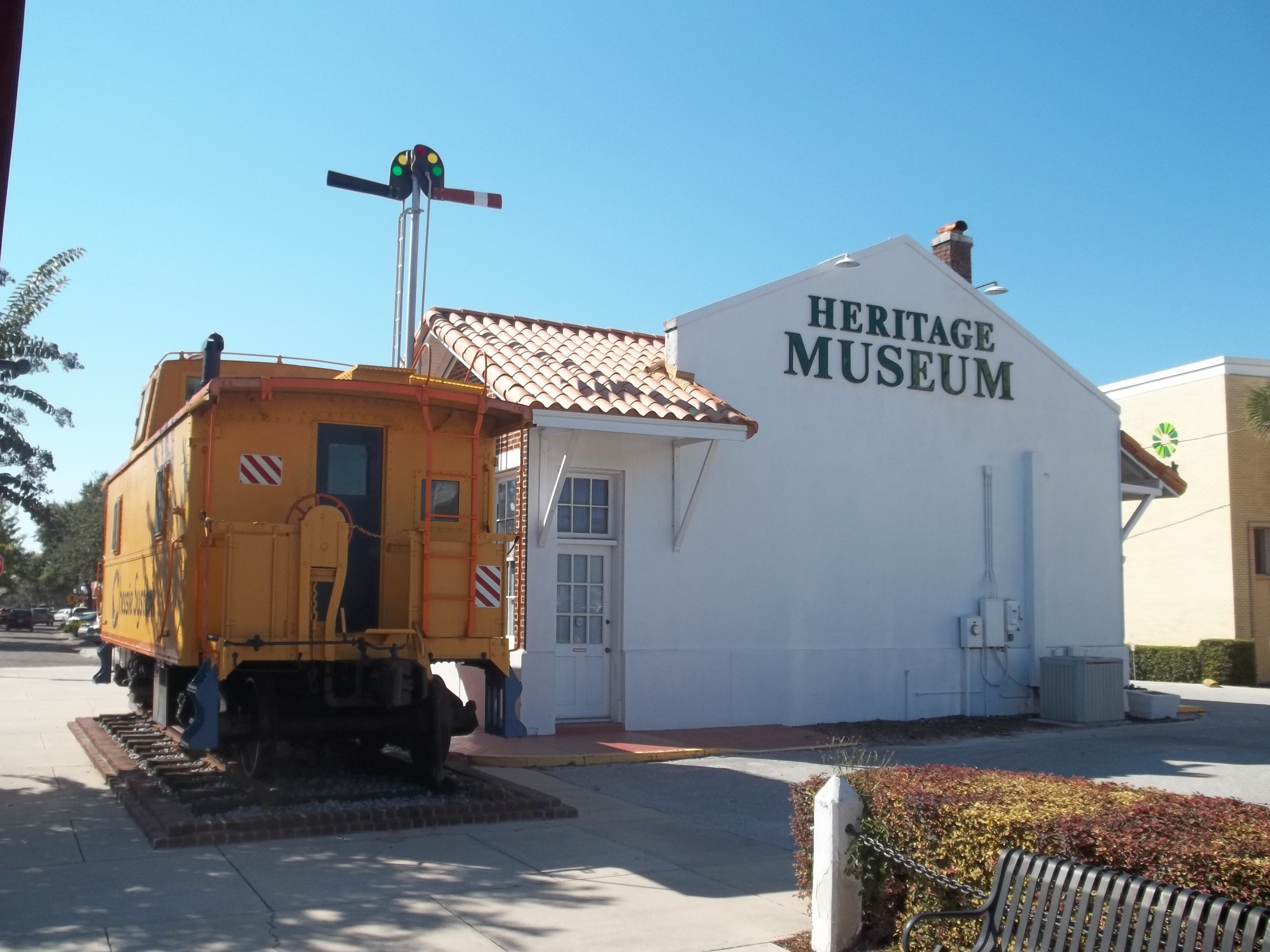
Heritage museum in the Winter Garden Downtown Historic District

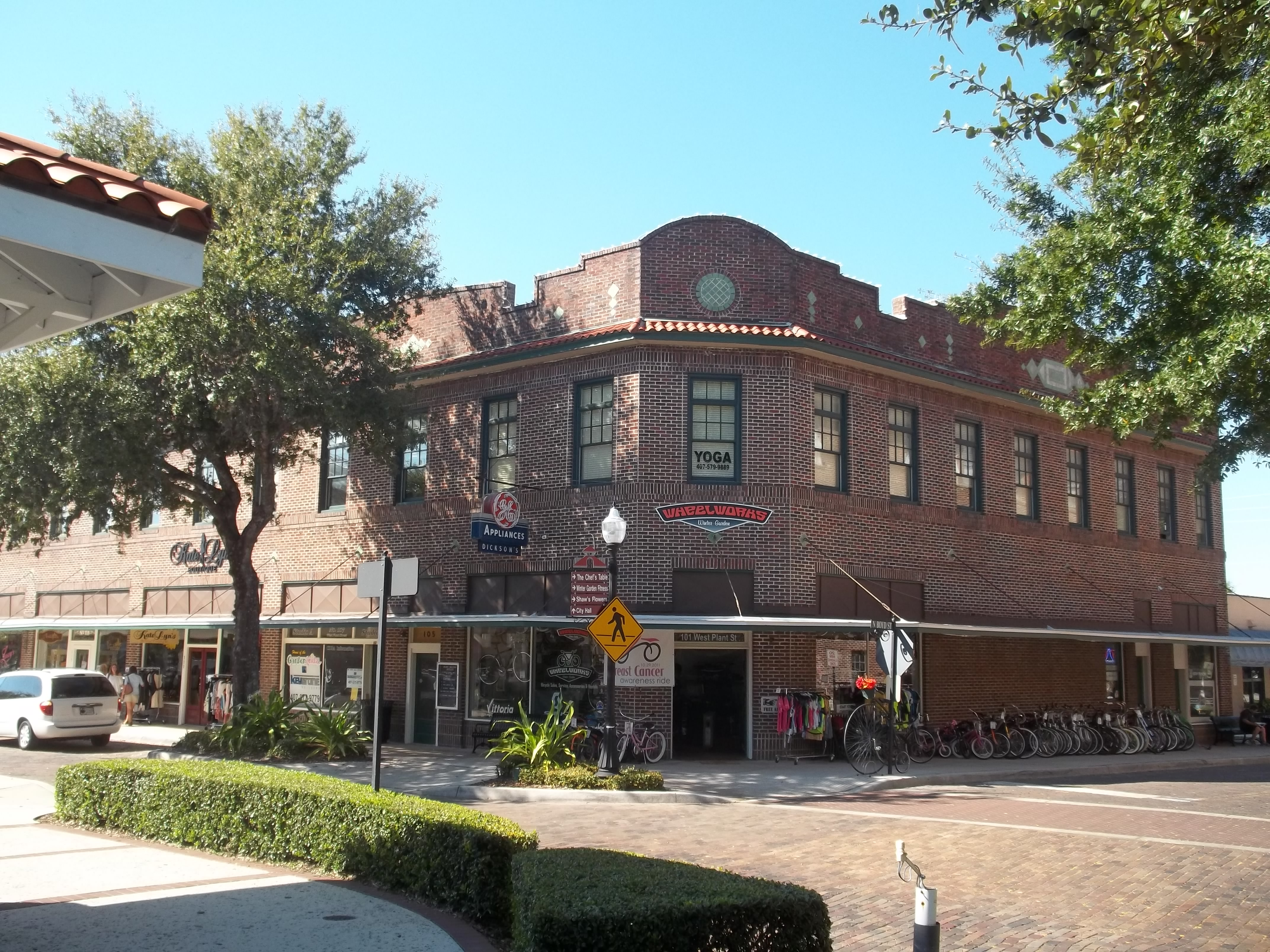
Building in the Winter Garden Downtown Historic District
