= Winter Garden Village at Fowler Groves =

Outdoor mall in Winter Garden, Florida

Coordinates: 28.523°N 81.583°W

Winter Garden Village at Fowler Groves is a mixed-used outdoor mall in Winter Garden, Florida. Located within the western Orlando metropolitan area just off the corner of the Daniel Webster Western Beltway and Winter Garden Vineland Road, the mall is located a few miles north of Walt Disney World.

== History ==
In 1877, Albert Thomas and his wife Lemyra moved to Florida and began to work on a piece of land where they cultivated citrus. After several years of working on the land, President Chester A. Arthur granted Mr. and Mrs. Thomas homestead rights to the land, in which they officially named their citrus grove Almyra Groves.

With the land being passed down to each of their heirs, eventual heir Harold E. Fowler Sr. expanded more of the property. Before he died in 1949 and passed it down to his heir Harold E. Fowler Jr., he changed the name to Fowler Groves. After the death of Harold Jr. in 1992, the remaining heirs of the property set up the Fowler Groves Limited Partnership. By the turn of the millennium, the family's citrus industry had slowed considerably from a century prior. In the mid-2000s, the partnership was approached by The Sembler Company to purchase the farm to develop into a massive mixed-use shopping center. After years of deliberation, by 2006 the partnership agreed to sell their family farm to The Sembler Company.

The Winter Garden Village at Fowler Groves shopping center officially opened in October 2007. The shopping center opened to critical acclaim. This luxury outdoor shopping center has since been a central fixture to the community of Winter Garden and the Central Florida area at large while giving homage to its agricultural roots as an orange grove.

== Anchors and major tenants ==
- Best Buy
- Burlington Coat Factory
- J.Crew
- LA Fitness
- Lowe's
- Macy's
- Marshalls
- Nike Factory Store
- Ross
- Target

== Restaurants ==
- Bonefish Grill
- Chick-fil-A
- Chipotle
- Cracker Barrel
- First Watch
- Five Guys
- Little Greek Fresh Grill
- LongHorn Steakhouse
- Panera Bread
- Uno
