= Winter Garden, Florida =

City in Florida, United States

- City
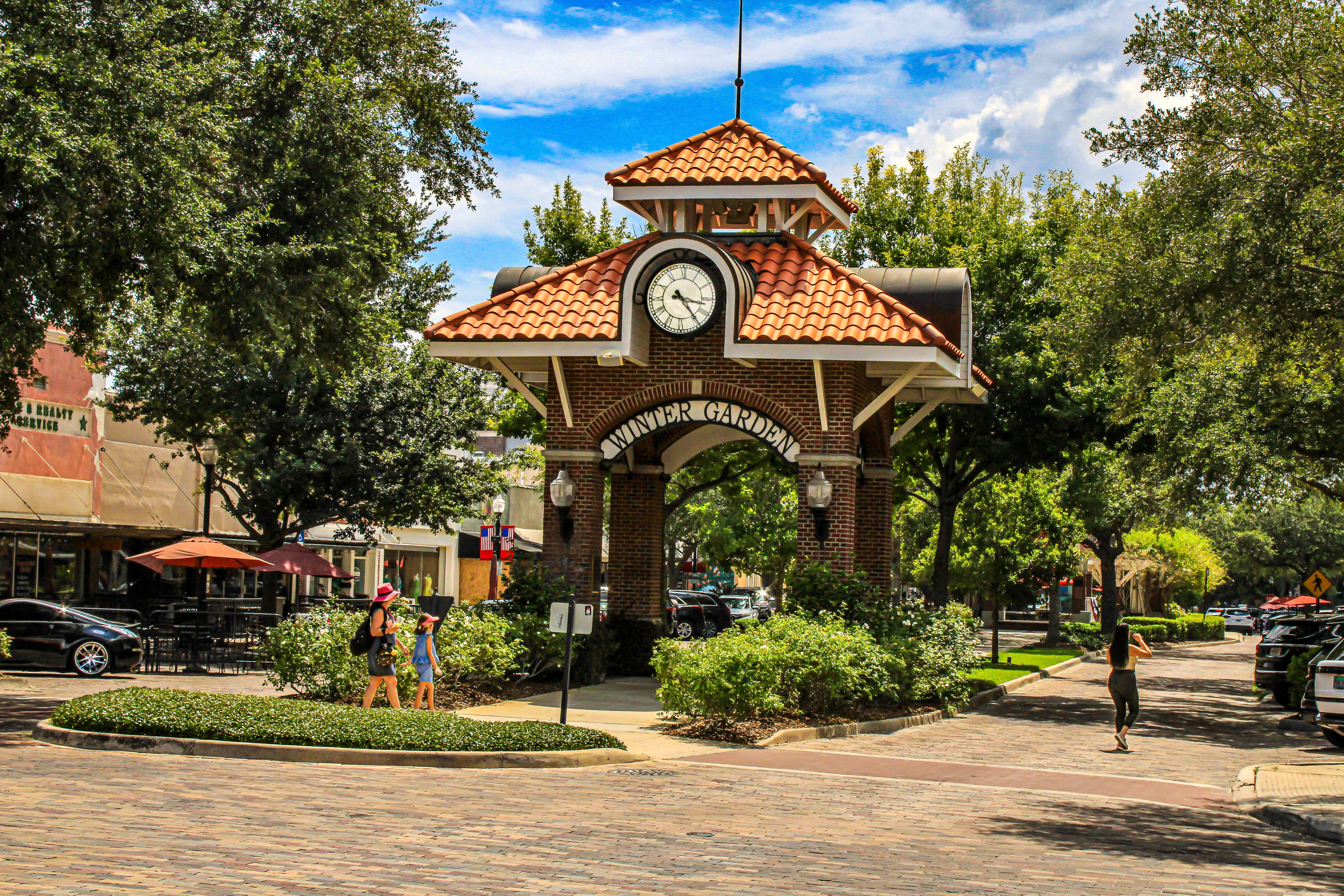
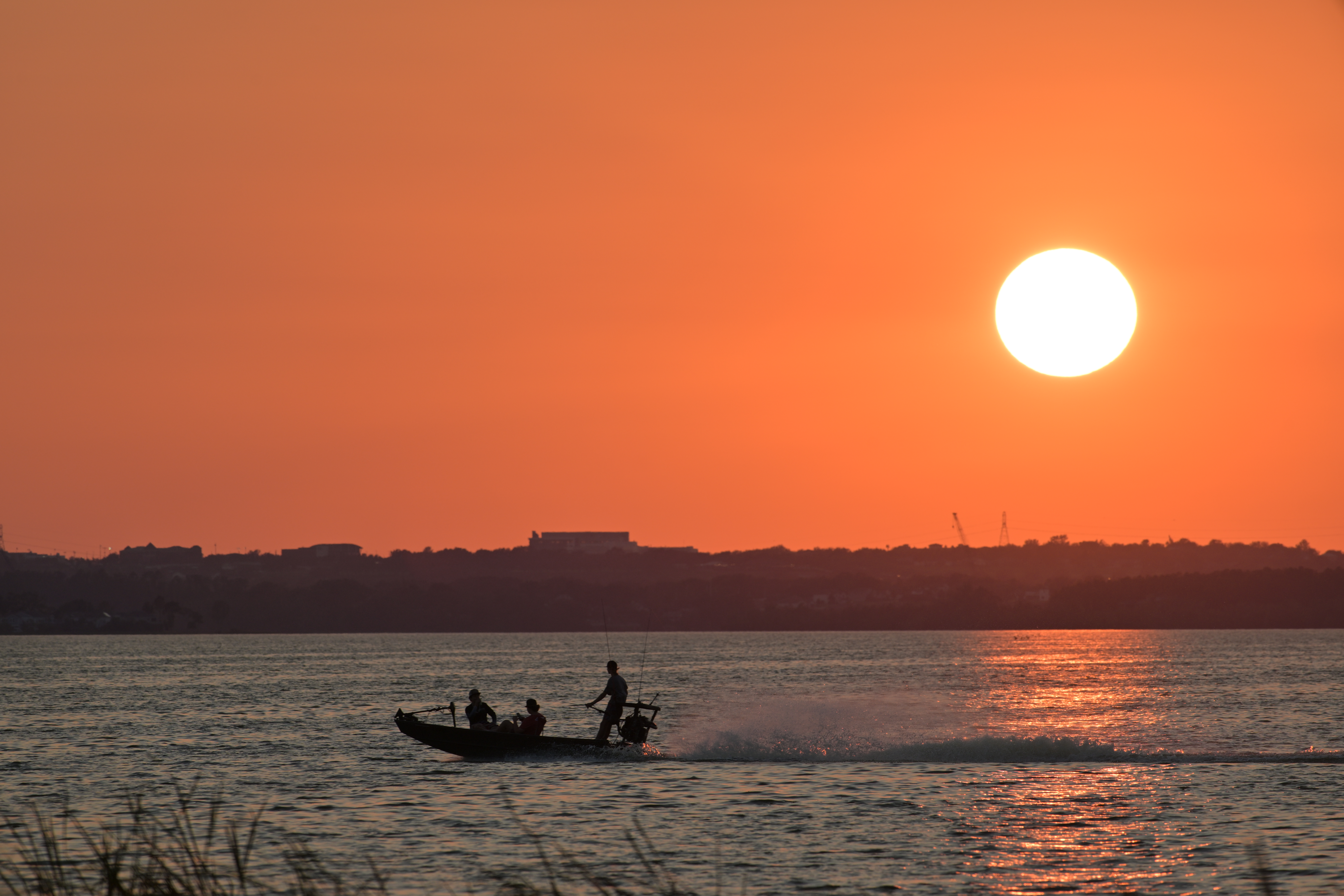
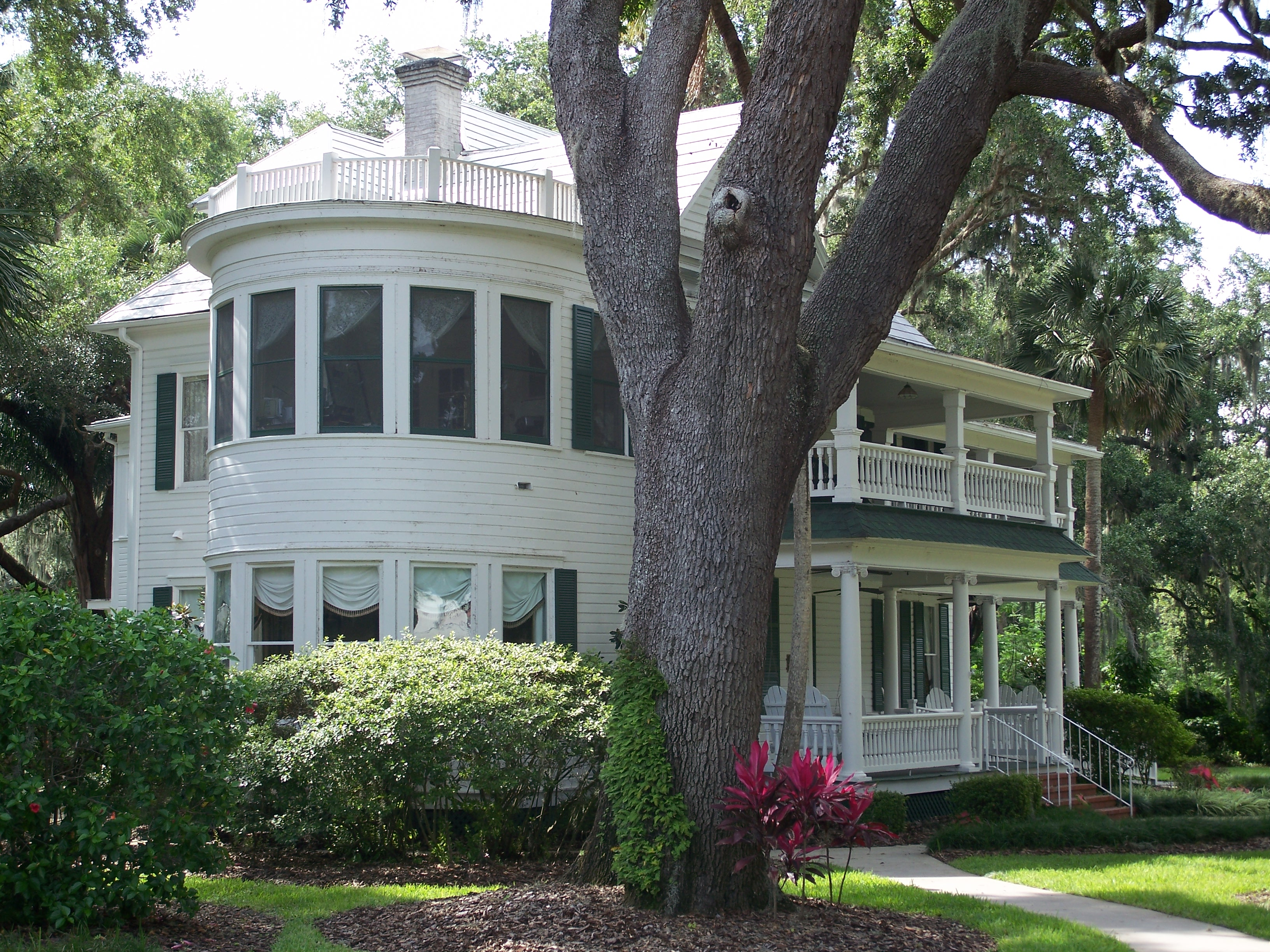
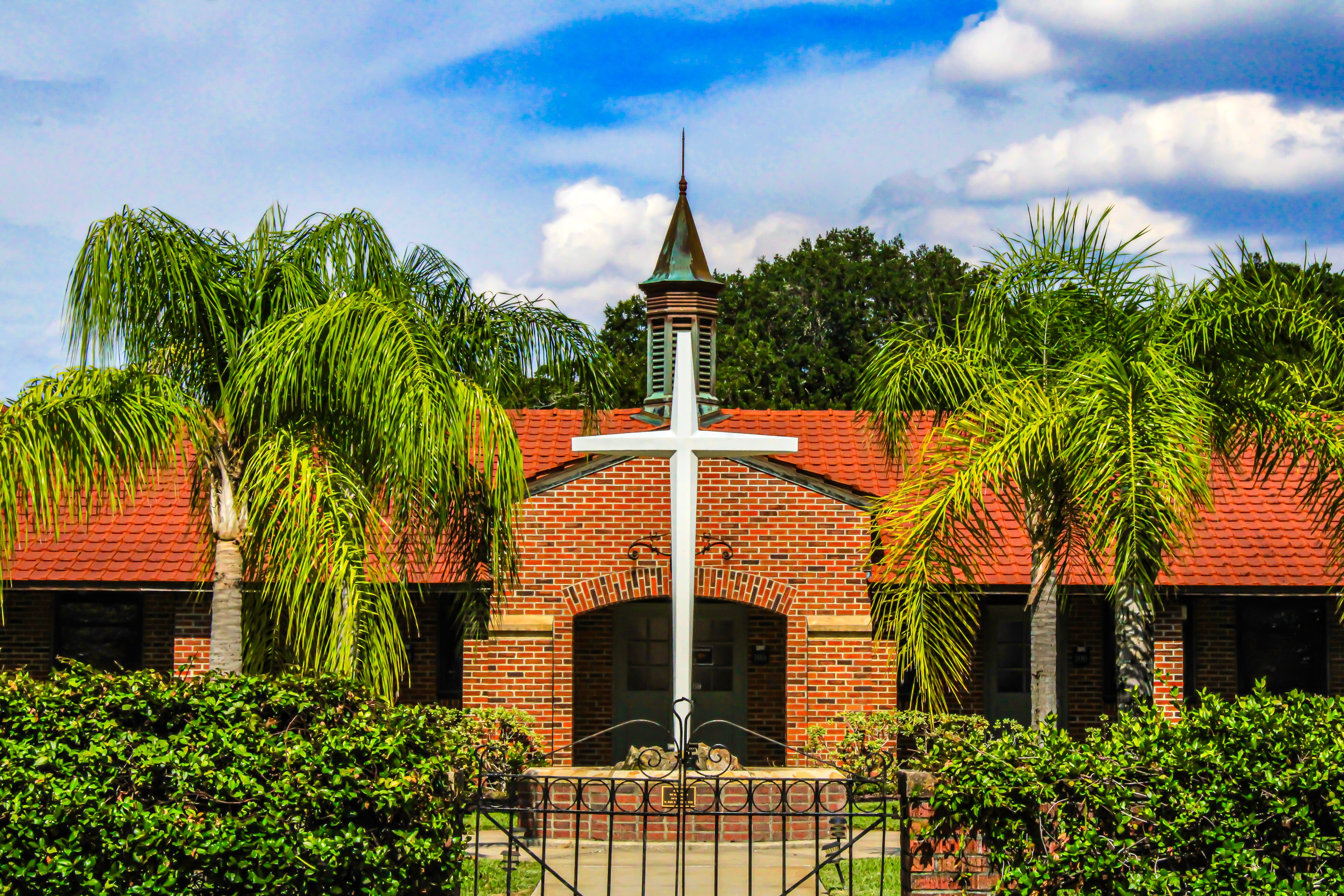
- Downtown Winter Garden on the West Orange Trail with Plant Street Lake Apopka Winter Garden Village Luther F. Tilden House First United Methodist Church in the Historic Residential District

- Mottoes: "Where Good Things Grow", "A charming little city with a juicy past."
- Location in Orange County and the state of Florida
- Coordinates: 28°31′20″N 81°36′43″W
- Country: United States
- State: Florida
- County: Orange
- Settled: c. 1850s
- Incorporated (city): 1908

Government
  - Type: Commission–Manager

Area
  - Total: 17.98 sq mi (46.56 km^{2})
  - Land: 16.33 sq mi (42.29 km^{2})
  - Water: 1.65 sq mi (4.27 km^{2})
- Elevation: 98 ft (30 m)

Population (2020)
  - Total: 46,964
  - Density: 2,876/sq mi (1,110.6/km^{2})
- Time zone: UTC−05:00 (EST)
  - Summer (DST): UTC−04:00 (EDT)
- ZIP codes: 34777, 34778, 34787
- Area codes: 407, 689
- FIPS code: 12-78250
- GNIS feature ID: 2405772
- Sales Tax: 6.5%
- Website: www.cwgdn.com

Winter Garden is a city in western Orange County, Florida, United States. Located 14 miles (23 km) west of Downtown Orlando, it is part of the Orlando metropolitan area. The population was 46,964 as of the 2020 census.

== History ==
The pre-European history of the modern Winter Garden area is ambiguous. Due to a lack of evidence, historians hesitate to conclude if the natives that once occupied the area were of the Timucua, Jororo, or Mayaca tribes. Regardless of their tribal identity, these natives were either wiped out or subsumed into larger cultures by the end of the eighteenth century.

Following the eradication of the original Floridian cultures, natives from farther north migrated into Florida. These natives had various cultures that over time coalesced into the Seminole Tribe. By the early 19th century, some Seminole lived on the south shore of Lake Apopka. The settlement possibly produced the significant Seminole leader Wild Cat. In 1835, the Second Seminole War began, threatening the Seminole presence. On January 23, 1837, a small battle was fought near the village. Thomas S. Jesup, at that time in command of all American forces in Florida, sent a detachment to Lake Apopka to seek a Seminole chief known as Osuchee or "Copper". During the attack, the army successfully killed Osuchee and three other Seminoles, while taking 17 prisoners. The Second and Third Seminole wars both pushed the Seminole tribe south, likely eliminating their presence in the boundaries of modern Winter Garden.

The first American settlers came to what is now Winter Garden in the 1850s. The Roper, Reams, Dunaway, Speer, and Starke families were among the first to settle the area. As with most American pioneers, they engaged in agriculture as a primary economic activity. These farms mainly grew sugar cane and vegetables, and early on a small number utilized slave labor. During The Civil War steamboat traffic stopped along the St. Johns River, forcing Winter Garden families to subsist off their own crops.

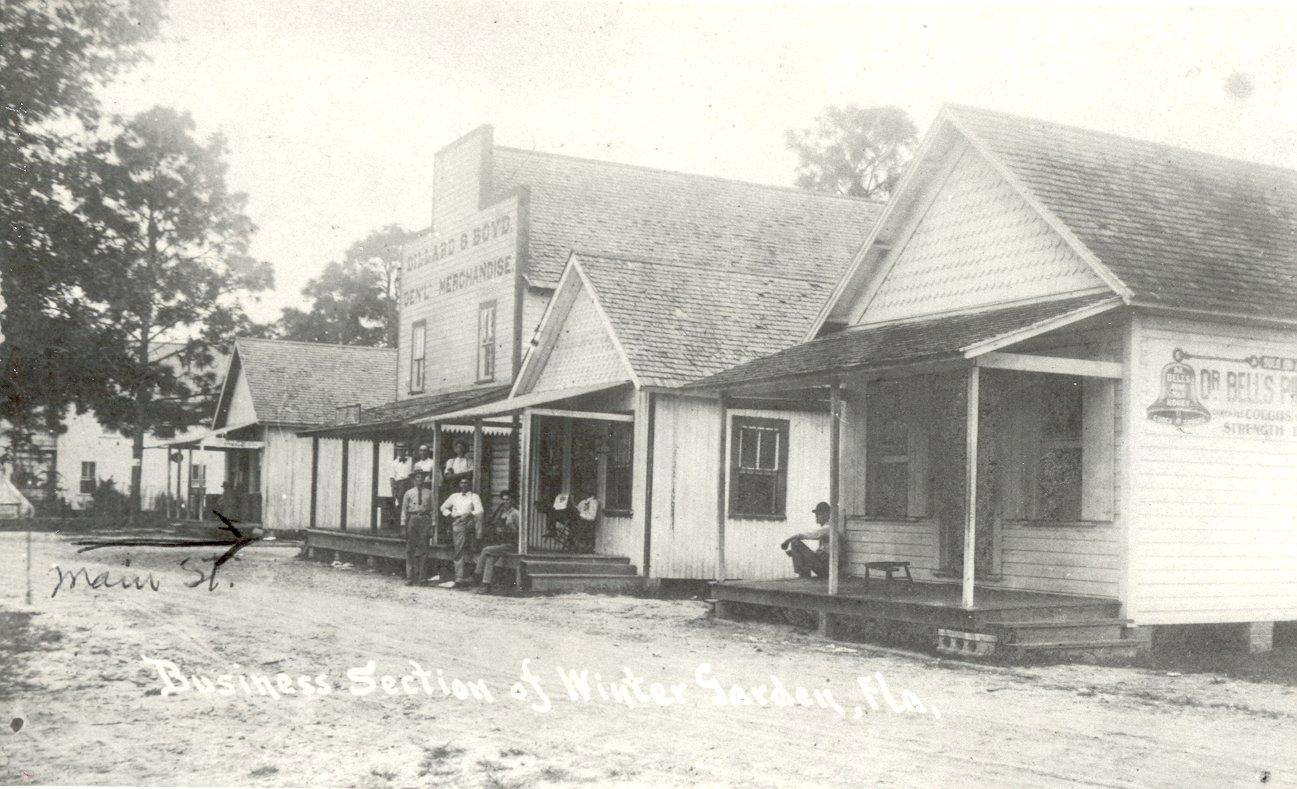
A photograph of downtown Winter Garden taken from Plant Street, looking east. Taken before or during 1909.

The arrival of the Orange Belt Railroad and the growing production of citrus, turpentine, and lumber drove the town's growth over the remaining decades of the 19th century and into the 20th. Stores and businesses cropped up along Plant Street, originating Downtown Winter Garden. A settler from Mississippi named A. B. Newton contributed to the town's early economy. He opened one of the first stores, served as the first postmaster, founded the first newspaper, and functioned as the first mayor. These endeavors earned him the title "The Godfather of Winter Garden".

Between the 1920s and 1960s, the fishing prospects of Lake Apopka drew many fishermen to Winter Garden. The Edgewater Hotel in Downtown Winter Garden opened to service fishermen during the fishing boom. However, by the end of the 1960s, heavy pollution of Lake Apopka resulted in the collapse of the industry.

Citrus agriculture saw rapid growth in the state of Florida in the last few decades of the 19th century, including in Winter Garden. As with the rest of the state, the Great Freeze of 1894–1895 severely damaged the citrus industry in Winter Garden. Many settlers left following this disaster, leaving a smaller population to recover the area's farms. Despite this setback, the industry recovered and saw many decades of growth. Through the middle stretch of the 20th century citrus defined Winter Garden's economy and culture.

In the 1980s, back-to-back freezes reduced the profitability of citrus farming in the county. Citrus production in Winter Garden and Orange County never recovered. Since then, the center of citrus production in Florida has shifted south from Orange County. The increasing development of the Orlando–Kissimmee–Sanford Metropolitan Area made it more profitable to sell grove lands to developers rather than attempt to restart them. Today, little citrus activity occurs in the city limits of Winter Garden. Yet, the town is proud of its citrus history; oranges and grapefruits continue to be symbols of the town.

During the 1998 Central Florida tornado outbreak, A long tracked F3 tornado ripped into Winter garden at 11:47 P.M. Killing 3 people and injuring 70 others.

Since 2000, Winter Garden has seen growth despite the decline of citrus and the economic stagnation in the 1980s and 1990s. Developers, entrepreneurs, and city government made efforts to rejuvenate the downtown district, attracting locals and tourists with a mix of small-town atmosphere and trendy businesses. This population and development growth endured through the Great Recession and continues today.

== Geography ==
According to the United States Census Bureau, the city has a total area of 15.6 square miles (40.4 km^{2}), of which 15.4 square miles (39.9 km^{2}) is land and 0.19 square miles (0.5 km^{2}) (1.28%) is water.

Winter Garden is bordered on the south by the town of Windermere and the census-designated place Horizon West, on the east by the city of Ocoee, on the west by the town of Oakland and the census-designated place Tildenville and on the north by Lake Apopka.

=== Topography ===
The terrain is characterized by a gentle to moderately sloping topography. Winter Garden has the highest elevation spot in Orange County. The highest elevation is 222 feet (68 m) in NAVD 88 (North American Vertical Datum) located in the southwest corner of the city South near the county line with Lake County. The lowest elevation in the city is 64 feet (20 m) near Lake Apopka.

=== Climate ===
Winter Garden has a warm and humid subtropical climate, and there are two major seasons each year. One of those seasons is hot and rainy, lasting from May until October (roughly coinciding with the Atlantic hurricane season). The other is a cooler season (November through March) that brings more moderate temperatures and less frequent rainfall. The area's warm and humid climate is caused primarily by its low elevation and its position relatively close to the Tropic of Cancer, and much of its weather is affected by the movement of the Gulf Stream.

== Demographics ==
Historical population
Census	Pop.	Note	%±
1910	351		—
1920	1,021		190.9%
1930	2,023		98.1%
1940	3,060		51.3%
1950	3,503		14.5%
1960	5,513		57.4%
1970	5,153		−6.5%
1980	6,789		31.7%
1990	9,745		43.5%
2000	14,351		47.3%
2010	34,568		140.9%
2020	46,964		35.9%
Source: U.S. Decennial Census; Florida Department of Agriculture

=== Racial and ethnic composition ===
Winter Garden racial composition (Hispanics excluded from racial categories) (NH = Non-Hispanic)
Race	Pop 2010	Pop 2020	% 2010	% 2020
White (NH)	18,762	24,412	54.28%	51.98%
Black or African American (NH)	5,274	5,769	15.26%	12.28%
Native American or Alaska Native (NH)	59	66	0.17%	0.14%
Asian (NH)	1,726	2,751	4.99%	5.86%
Pacific Islander or Native Hawaiian (NH)	33	26	0.10%	0.06%
Some other race (NH)	303	617	0.88%	1.31%
Two or more races/Multiracial (NH)	805	2,823	2.33%	6.01%
Hispanic or Latino (any race)	7,606	10,500	22.00%	22.36%
Total	34,568	46,964		

=== 2020 census ===
As of the 2020 census, Winter Garden had a population of 46,964. The median age was 38.2 years. 25.8% of residents were under the age of 18 and 12.7% of residents were 65 years of age or older. For every 100 females there were 93.3 males, and for every 100 females age 18 and over there were 89.9 males age 18 and over.

100.0% of residents lived in urban areas, while 0.0% lived in rural areas.

There were 15,974 households in Winter Garden, of which 42.2% had children under the age of 18 living in them. Of all households, 58.5% were married-couple households, 12.9% were households with a male householder and no spouse or partner present, and 23.3% were households with a female householder and no spouse or partner present. About 17.7% of all households were made up of individuals and 6.9% had someone living alone who was 65 years of age or older.

There were 16,909 housing units, of which 5.5% were vacant. The homeowner vacancy rate was 1.4% and the rental vacancy rate was 6.3%.

Racial composition as of the 2020 census
Race	Number	Percent
White	26,567	56.6%
Black or African American	6,007	12.8%
American Indian and Alaska Native	130	0.3%
Asian	2,780	5.9%
Native Hawaiian and Other Pacific Islander	39	0.1%
Some other race	3,900	8.3%
Two or more races	7,541	16.1%
Hispanic or Latino (of any race)	10,500	22.4%

=== 2010 census ===
As of the 2010 United States census, there were 34,568 people, 10,569 households, and 7,801 families residing in the city.

=== 2000 census ===
As of the 2000 United States census, there were 14,351 people, 5,380 households, and 3,663 families residing in the city. The population density was 1,190.2 inhabitants per square mile (459.5/km^{2}). There were 5,861 housing units at an average density of 486.1 per square mile (187.7/km^{2}). The racial makeup of the city was 76.60% White, 13.25% African American, 0.36% Native American, 0.99% Asian, 0.05% Pacific Islander, 6.45% from other races, and 2.31% from two or more races. Hispanic or Latino of any race were 17.50% of the population.

In 2000, there were 5,380 households, out of which 33.2% had children under the age of 18 living with them, 48.8% were married couples living together, 14.4% had a female householder with no husband present, and 31.9% were non-families. 25.2% of all households were made up of individuals, and 9.7% had someone living alone who was 65 years of age or older. The average household size was 2.60 and the average family size was 3.11.

In 2000, in the city the population was spread out, with 25.9% under the age of 18, 9.0% from 18 to 24, 31.3% from 25 to 44, 19.5% from 45 to 64, and 14.2% who were 65 years of age or older. The median age was 37.1 years. For every 100 females, there were 91.9 males. For every 100 females age 18 and over, there were 88.8 males.

In 2000, the median income for a household in the city was $41,858. About 10.1% of families and 12.0% of the population were below the poverty line, including 19.7% of those under age 18 and 9.4% of those age 65 or over.

== Arts and culture ==
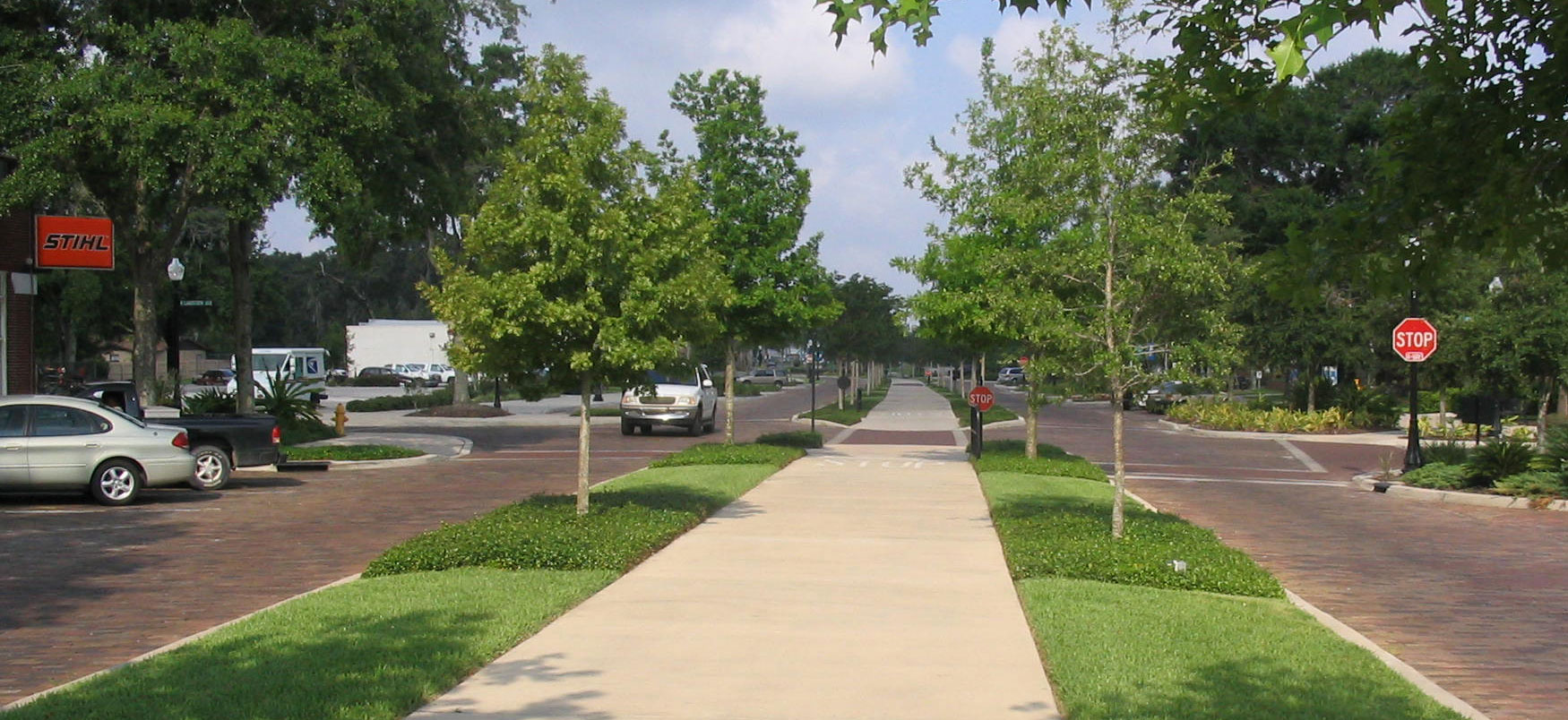
The West Orange Trail

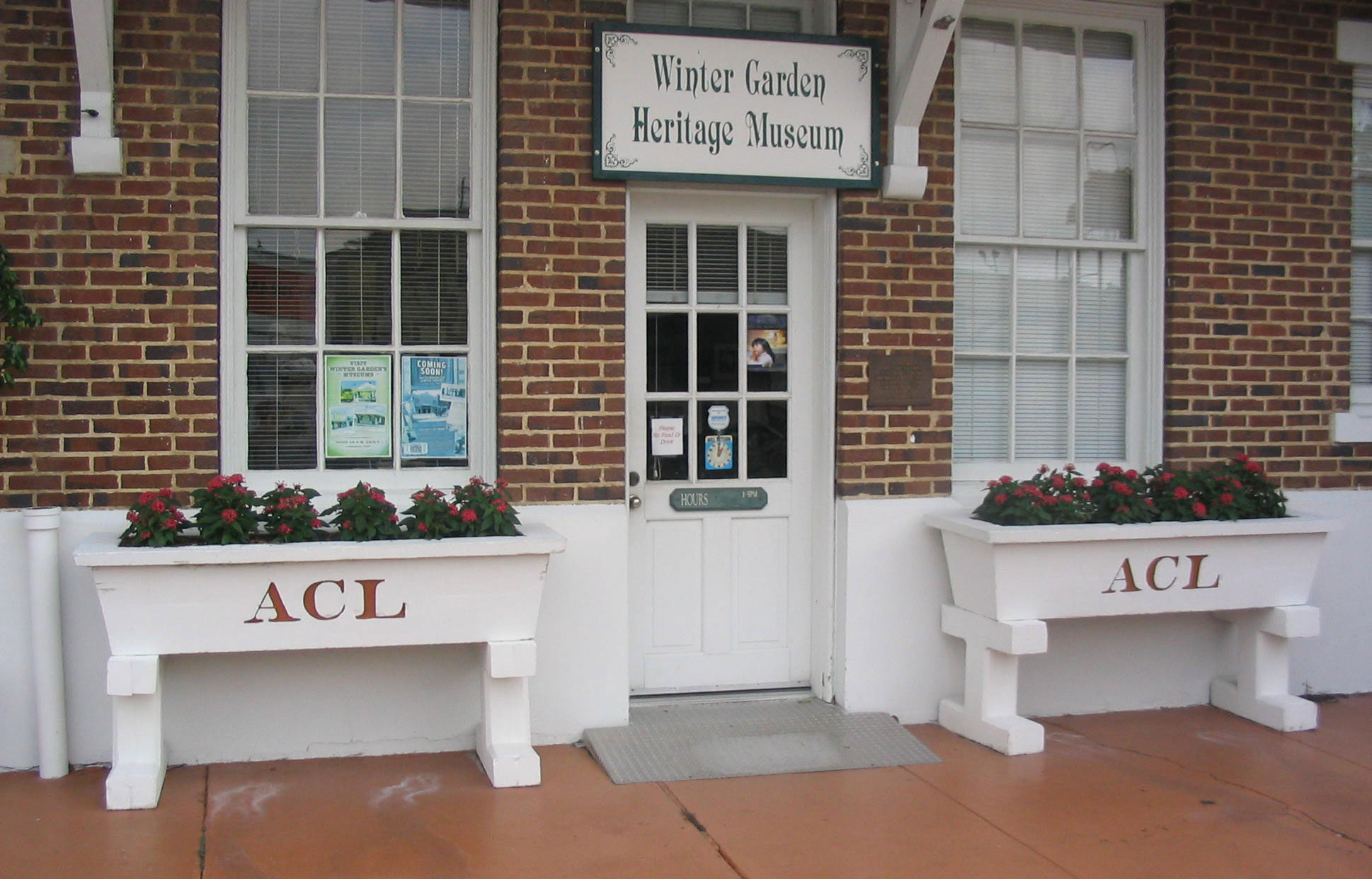
The Winter Garden Heritage Museum, originally a station on the Orange Belt Railway (later part of the ACL)

- Central Florida Railroad Museum
- Garden Theatre
- Luther F. Tilden House
- West Orange Trail
- Winter Garden Downtown Historic District
- Winter Garden Heritage Museum
- Winter Garden Historic Residential District

=== Shopping ===
The Winter Garden Downtown Historic District contains a collection of restaurants, shops, and cafés, as well as two museums and a performing arts venue.

To the south, Winter Garden Village provides an array of chain retail and dining establishments. The 1,100,000 square feet (100,000 m^{2}) open-air shopping center, located along Daniels Road just north of SR 429, is anchored by a Super Target, a Best Buy, and a Lowe's.

Downtown Winter Garden hosts a farmer's market every weekend. Many vendors sell fresh produce, plants, and flowers, herbs, baked goods, artisan crafts, and local food and beverages. Live music is also a feature of the market.

== Transportation ==
State Road 50 bisects the city into northern and southern sections. The portion south of State Road 50, formerly occupied by orange groves and farmland, has recently been the site of the development of numerous large-scale communities, including Johns Lake Pointe, Stoneybrook West, Stonecrest, Westfield, and Wintermere Pointe.

The toll road Western Beltway (SR 429) was completed in late 2006 and links I-4 near mile marker 58 in Osceola County with Florida's Turnpike at Winter Garden. Other major roads through Winter Garden include County Road 535 and County Road 545. CR 535 (also called Winter Garden – Vineland Road) begins at SR 50 and bisects the southern half of the city, proceeding south to Windermere, Lake Buena Vista and Walt Disney World, where it becomes State Road 535. CR 545 (also called Avalon Road) begins at SR 50 and proceeds south along the western edge of Winter Garden and along the border between Orange and Lake counties. This area remains mostly rural but is quickly developing because of the nearby toll road. CR 545 currently ends at US 192 in Kissimmee at the border to Osceola County.

== Notable people ==
- Brian Davis, professional golfer
- Nolan Fontana, professional MLB baseball infielder for the Texas Rangers
- Stone Forsythe, professional American football offensive lineman for the Las Vegas Raiders
- Austin Gomber, professional MLB baseball pitcher for the Colorado Rockies
- Lyoto Machida, former UFC light heavyweight champion
- George Bray McMillan, pilot with the Flying Tigers; Army Air Corps fighter pilot and World War II combat "ace"
- Adande Thorne, Trinidadian-American YouTuber and animator known for his YouTube channel, sWooZie
- Luther F. Tilden, pioneer who settled near Winter Garden and contributed to its growth
- Dexter Williams, former professional American football running back
- Mason Williams, professional MLB baseball shortstop for the Cincinnati Reds
