= Winter Garden Historic Residential District =

Historic district in Florida, United States

- U.S. National Register of Historic Places
- U.S. Historic district
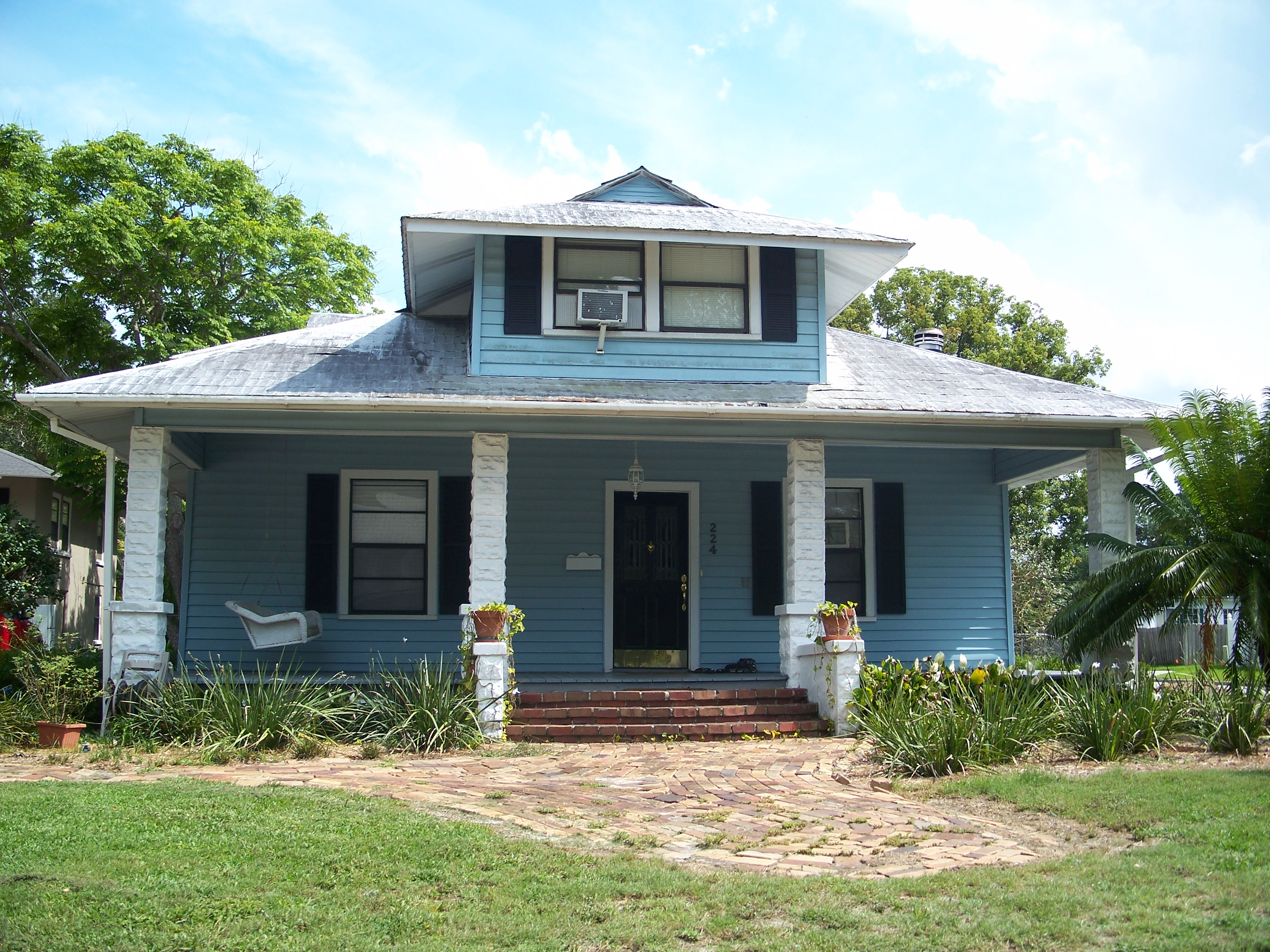
- House in the district

- Location within Florida Location within the United States
- Location: Winter Garden, Florida
- Coordinates: 28°34′1″N 81°35′25″W
- Area: 250 acres (1.0 km^{2})
- Architect: George H.Spohn
- Architectural style: Bungalow/Craftsman, Prairie School, Colonial Revival
- NRHP reference No.: 96000849
- Added to NRHP: August 1, 1996

The Winter Garden Historic Residential District is a U.S. historic district in Winter Garden, Florida. It is bounded by Plant, Boyd, Tilden, and Central Streets, encompasses approximately 250 acres (1.0 km^{2}), and contains 76 historic buildings. On August 1, 1996, it was added to the U.S. National Register of Historic Places.
