= George Bray McMillan =

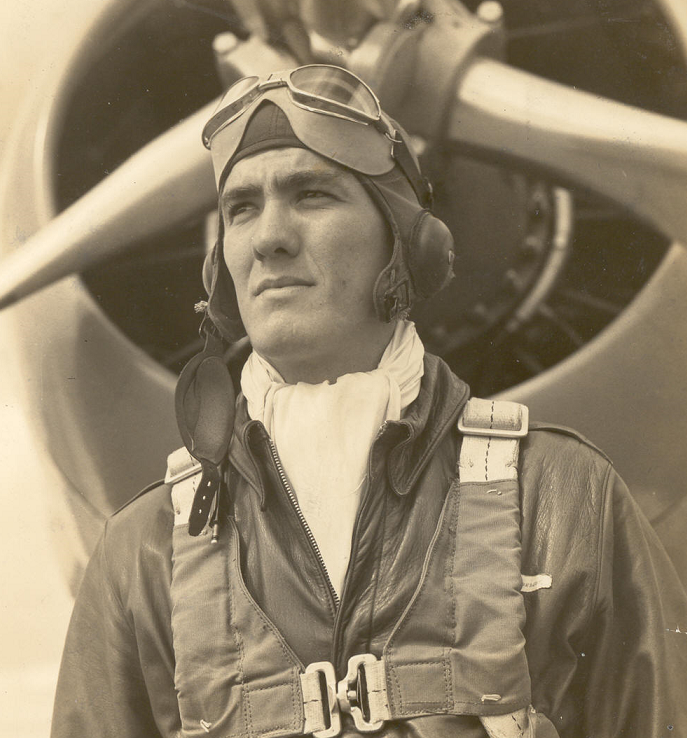
- Born: October 13, 1916; Winter Garden, Florida, US
- Died: June 24, 1944 (aged 27); Pingxiang, China
- Burial place: Arlington National Cemetery
- Military career
- Allegiance: United States
- Branch: United States Army Air Forces; American Volunteer Group
- Service years: 1938-1944
- Rank: Lieutenant Colonel
- Commands: 449th Fighter Squadron
- Conflicts: World War II: China-Burma-India Theater
- Awards: Distinguished Flying Cross; Bronze Star Medal; Air Medal; Purple Heart; Order of the Cloud and Banner

Lieutenant Colonel George Bray McMillan (October 13, 1916 – June 24, 1944) was a United States Army Air Forces fighter pilot, Squadron Commander, combat "ace" and member of the American Volunteer Group better known as the Flying Tigers.

== Early life ==
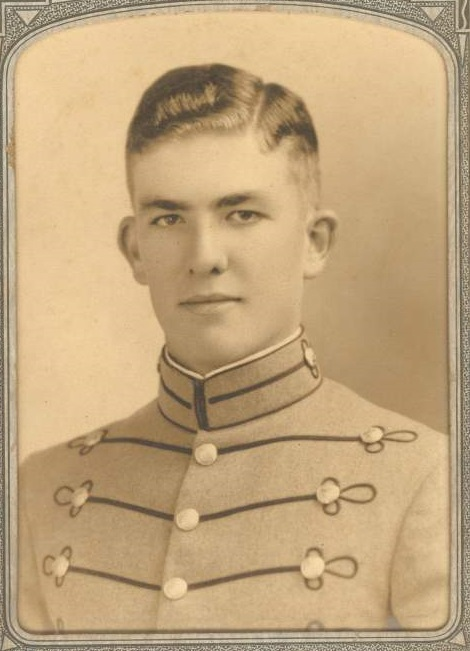
McMillan as a cadet at The Citadel, 1937

McMillan was born in Winter Garden, Florida and attended Lakeview High School. He developed an early interest in flying and sought an appointment to West Point and the U.S. Naval Academy but after failing to receive one enrolled at Marion Military Institute in Alabama; he attended for one year then transferred to The Citadel in Charleston, South Carolina as a member of the Class of 1938. When McMillan was six credits away from graduating, he decommissioned to join the American Volunteer Group. In 2022, The Citadel awarded a posthumous degree to the veteran.

== Military service ==
McMillan was accepted into the U.S. Army Aviation Cadet Training Program (USAAF) and attended pilot training at Randolph Field, Texas receiving his wings in May, 1939. He subsequently served as a fighter pilot flying the Curtiss P-36 Hawk aircraft with the 55th Pursuit Squadron at Barksdale Field, Louisiana and the 23d Composite Group at Maxwell Field, Alabama, Orlando Army Air Base and Eglin Field, Florida; he also attended the Air Corps Advanced Flying School at Kelly Field, Texas.

=== Flying Tigers ===
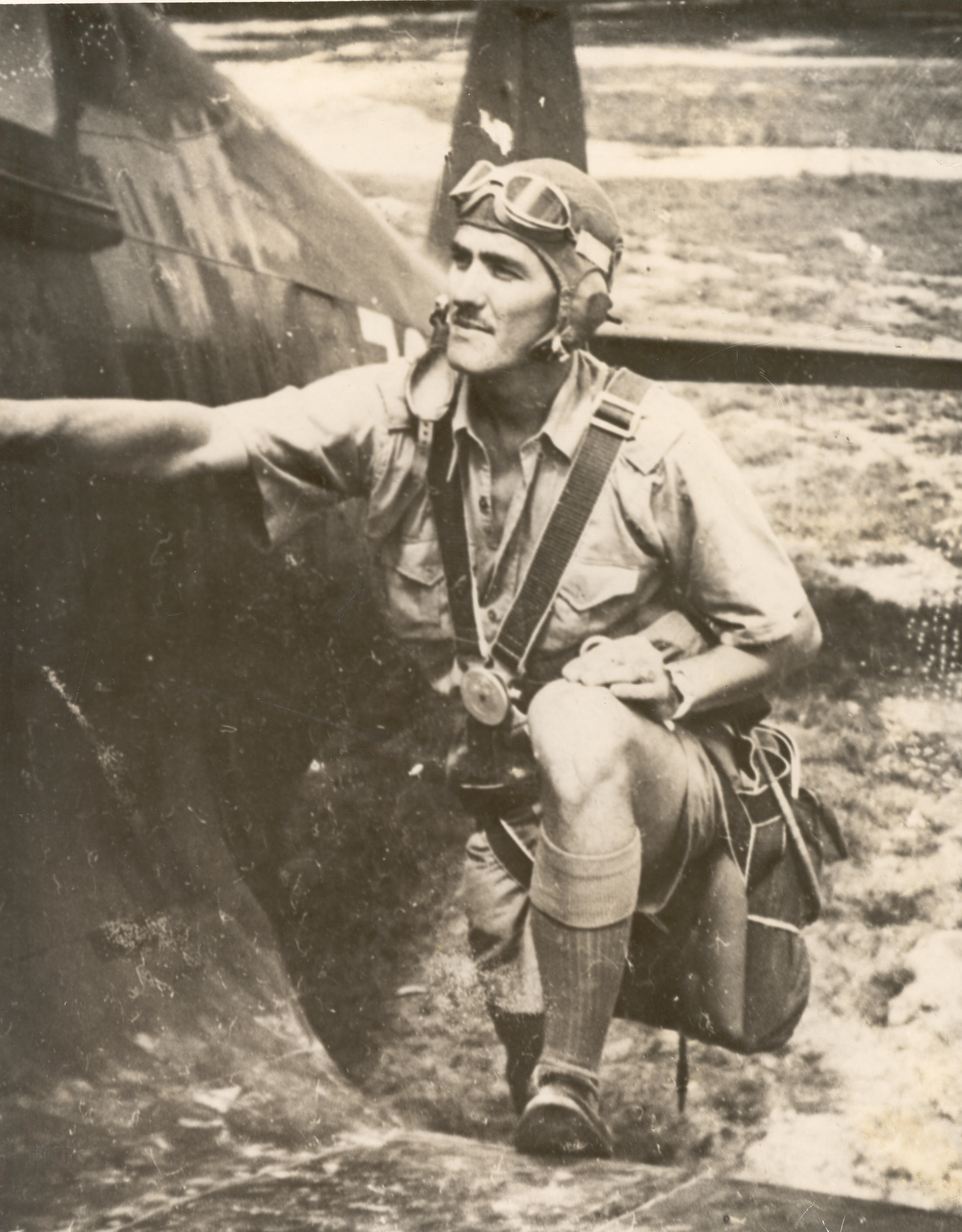
With the Flying Tigers in China, 1941

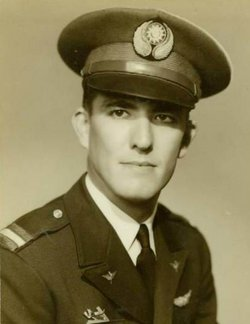
In the uniform of the Nationalist Chinese Air Force during AVG service

In July, 1941 McMillan was one of 100 military pilots to answer a call for volunteers to serve as civilians employed by the Chinese government to aid in their fight against the Japanese. He resigned his Army commission and sailed for Asia aboard the Dutch liner Blomfontein on July 24, arriving in Rangoon, Burma the following month. McMillan was assigned to the 3d Squadron (“Hells Angels”) of the 1st American Volunteer Group flying the Curtiss P-40 Warhawk; he served as a Flight Leader, Operations Officer and Vice Commander of the unit, being credited with 4.5 aerial victories and surviving a crash landing after his plane was badly damaged during a mission on Christmas Day of 1941 In March 1942 McMillan and 3 other AVG pilots were sent on a 14,000 mile odyssey to pick up brand new P-40E aircraft in Accra, Ghana and ferry them back to China by way of Nigeria, Sudan, Egypt, Bahrain and Pakistan.

=== Later World War II service ===
After the AVG was disbanded in July 1942, McMillan remained in China briefly to help organize the new 23d Fighter Group. After returning stateside he was recommissioned as a Major in the Army Air Forces and assigned to the 1st Proving Ground Group in Florida where he served as a test pilot flying virtually every aircraft in the inventory. He returned to China in October, 1943 serving briefly with the Chinese-American Composite Wing (Provisional) then was assigned to the 449th Squadron of the 51st Fighter Group flying the Lockheed P-38 Lightning and again serving under General Claire Lee Chennault who had commanded the Flying Tigers; promoted to Lieutenant Colonel he was named Commander of the squadron the following month. He was credited with destroying 4 more Japanese aircraft before being shot down and killed on his 53d mission near Pingxiang, China on June 24, 1944; his remains were buried at a cemetery in Shanghai then eventually reinterred at Arlington National Cemetery. His 8.5 aerial victories make him one of 26 Flying Tigers pilots to have become an "ace" by the end of World War II.

=== Awards and decorations ===
United States Army Air Forces pilot badge
Distinguished Flying Cross with Oak Leaf Cluster
Bronze Star
Purple Heart
Presidential Unit Citation
Air Medal with 2 Oak Leaf Clusters
American Defense Service Medal
American Campaign Medal
Asiatic-Pacific Campaign Medal
World War II Victory Medal
Order of the Cloud and Banner
Chinese Air Force 3 Star Medal
China War Memorial Medal

== Sources ==
- Losonsky, Frank S. Flying Tiger: A Crew Chief's Story: The War Diary of an AVG Crew Chief. Atglen, Pennsylvania: Schiffer Publishing, 2000. ISBN 0-7643-0045-8.
- Olynyk, Frank J. AVG & USAAF (China-Burma-India Theater) Credits for Destruction of Enemy Aircraft in Air to Air Combat, World War 2. Aurora, Ohio: Privately published, 1986. OCLC 23108588
- Pistole, Larry M. The Pictorial History of the Flying Tigers Publishers Press, Inc. Orange, Virginia
