= Central Florida Railroad Museum =

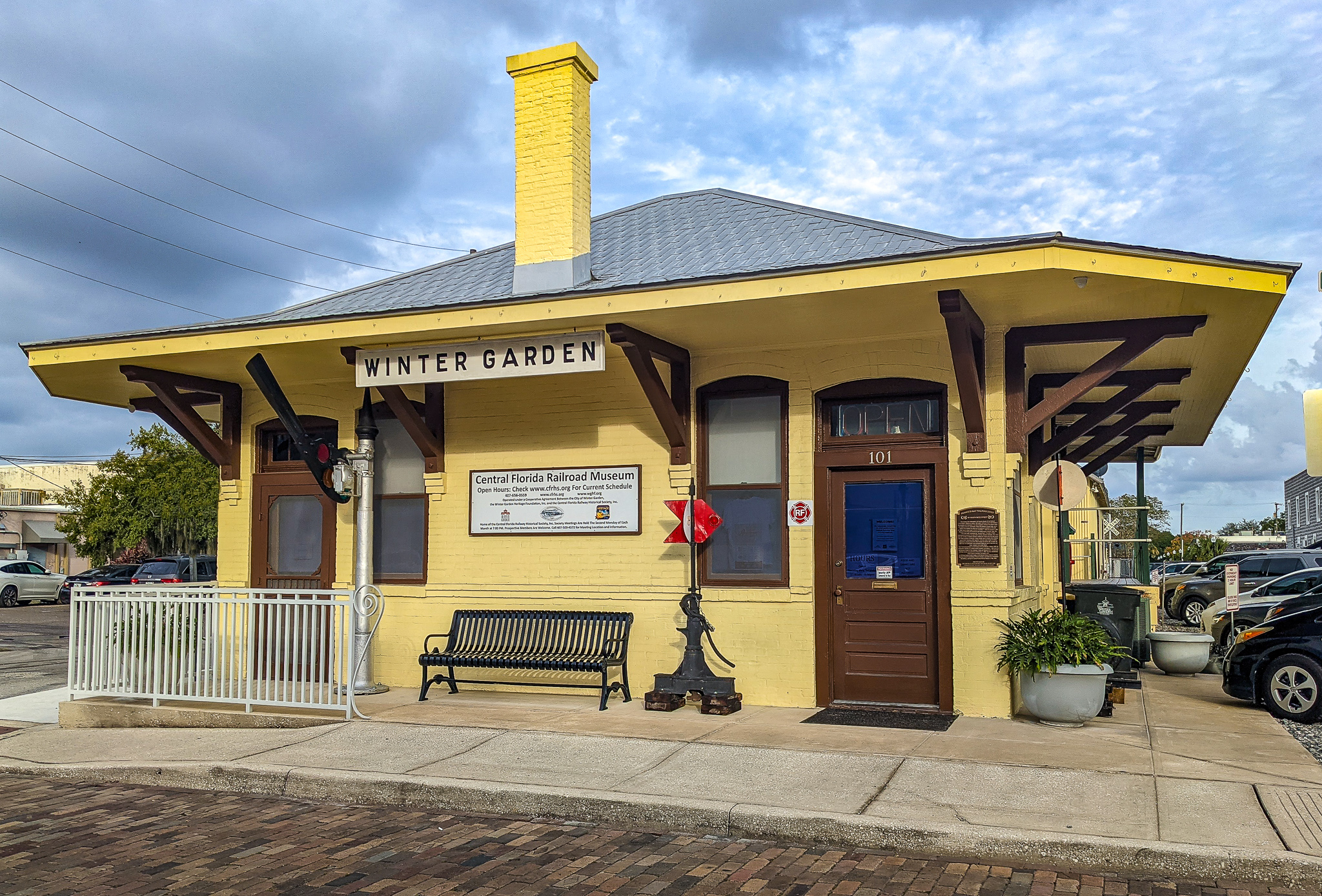
- Central Florida Railroad Museum, Operated by the Central Florida Railway Historical Society.

- Location within Florida
- Established: 1983
- Location: 101 South Boyd Street; Winter Garden, Florida
- Coordinates: 28.5648°N 81.5866°W
- Type: Railway museum
- Website: Central Florida Railroad Museum

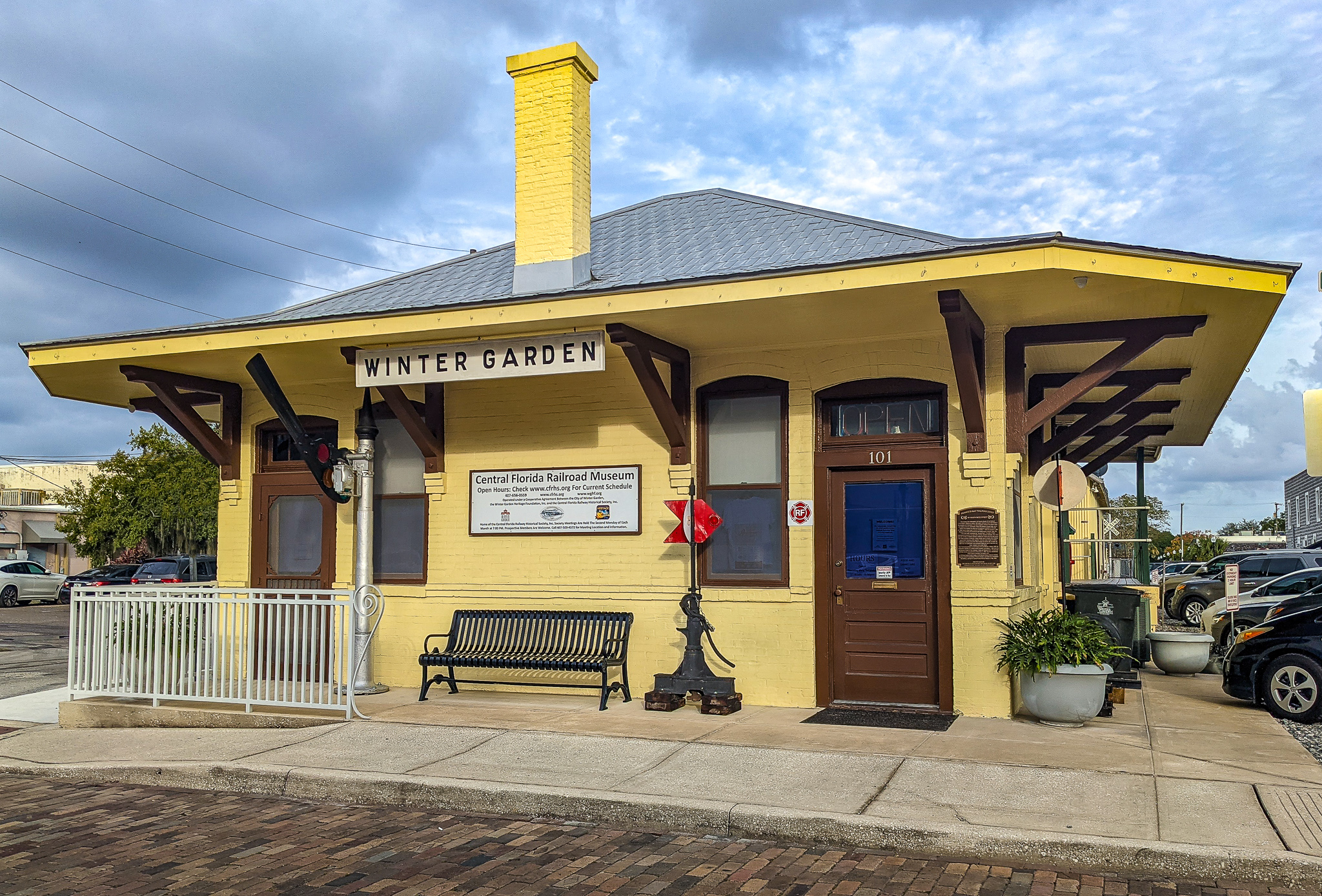
Central Florida Railroad Museum in Winter Garden, FL. Photo Nov. 2021.

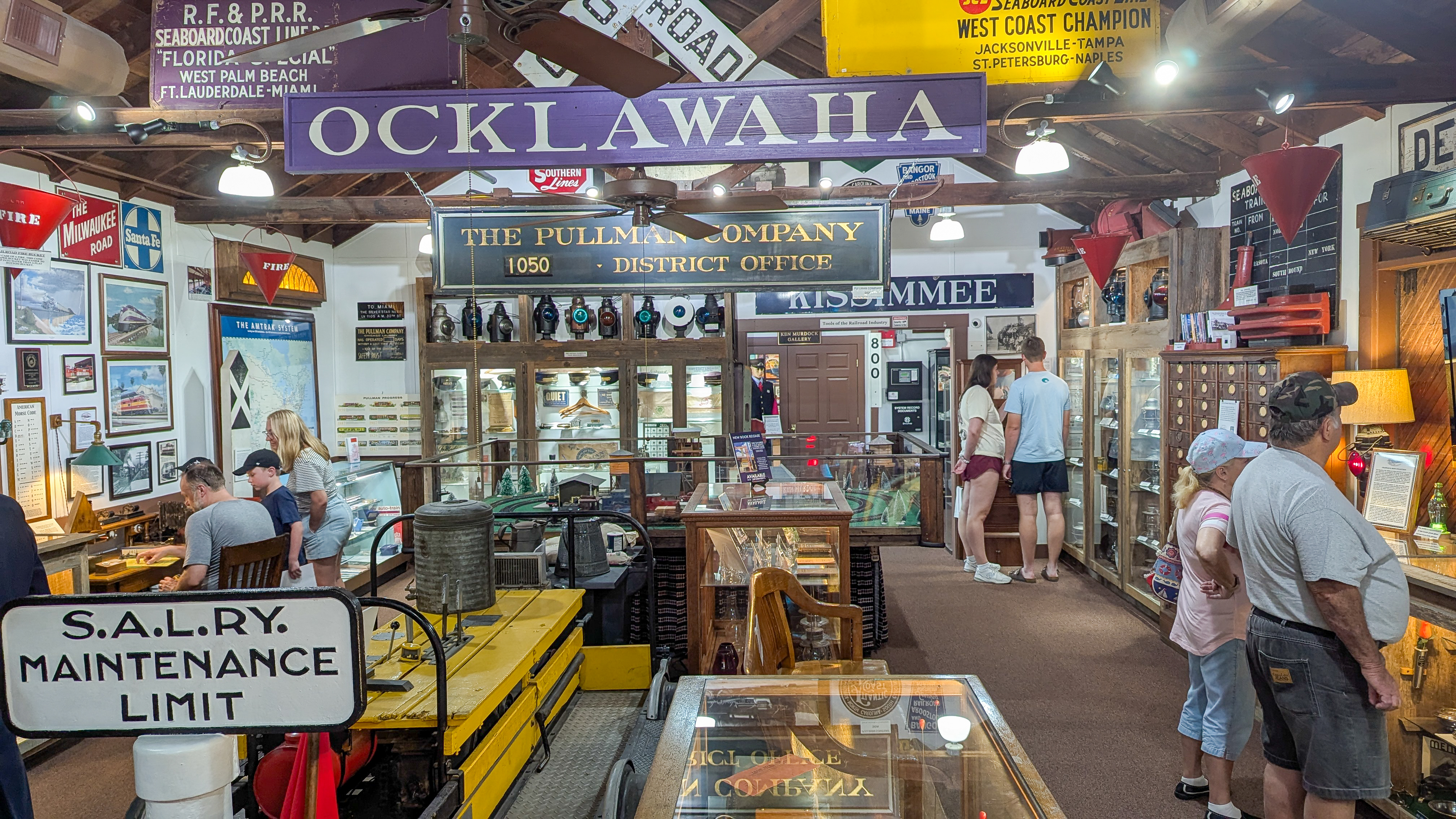
Central Florida Railroad Museum in Winter Garden.

The Central Florida Railroad Museum is located at 101 South Boyd Street, Winter Garden, Florida in a former Tavares and Gulf depot built in 1913. It is open Tuesday-Friday from 11:00am until 3:00pm, and Saturday from 10:00am until 3:00pm, excluding holidays. The museum contains exhibits depicting Central Florida's railroading history, including a large collection of dining car china. It is part of the Winter Garden Downtown Historic District, which is listed on the National Register of Historic Places. The museum is operated by the Central Florida Railway Historical Society and opened in 1983. The museum operates in conjunction with the Winter Garden Heritage Foundation.
