= Viera, Florida =

Coordinates: 28°15′59″N 80°43′44″W

- Planned community
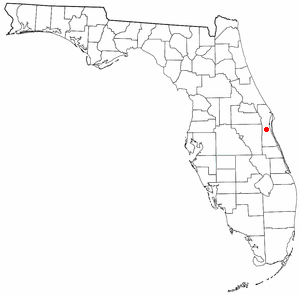
- Location of Viera, Florida
- Country: United States
- State: Florida
- County: Brevard

Viera (/vjɛrə/) is a planned community located in the central coastal region of Brevard County, Florida, United States. It is part of an unincorporated section adjacent to the Melbourne, Florida area. For census purposes, it is divided between the Census Designated Places of Viera East and Viera West. At the 2020 census, Viera East had a population of 11,687, while Viera West had a population of 16,688.

== Geography ==
The Viera area borders 8 miles (13 km) along Interstate 95 starting at exit 195 and extending south of Florida Road 404. It encompasses 14,500 acres (5,900 ha). About half of this has been set aside for conservation.

== Neighborhoods ==
The community consists of 76 neighborhoods in two specific areas named Viera East (38) and Viera West (38). Included are five active adult communities/55+, Brennity at Melbourne, Bridgewater at Viera, Viera Manor and Heritage Isle, Grand Isle, along with a military retirement community, Indian River Colony Club.

=== Viera East ===
The neighborhood communities of Viera East are Auburn Lakes, Bayhill, Crane Creek, Cross Creek, Fawn Ridge, Grand Isle, Hammock Lakes, Hammock Trace, Heron's Landing, Lakes at Viera East, Mission Bay Apartments, Osprey, Six Mile Creek, The Greens at Viera, Capron Ridge, The Heritage, The Villages of Viera East, Viera East Golf Club, and Wingate Estates.

Viera East Golf Club includes the following communities: those of Aberdeen, Addington, Ashton, Blackheath, Brightwood, Canterbury, Collingtree, Durban Park, Oaklefe, Parkstone, Stratford Place, and Woodhall.
The villages of Viera East include the following communities: those of Bennington, Somerville, and Templeton.

=== Viera West ===
The neighborhood communities of Viera West are Adelaide, Arrivas Village, Artistry at Viera Apartments, Fairway Lakes at Duran, Heritage Isle, Highlands Viera West Apartments, Marisol at Viera Apartments, Modern Duran, Sonoma, Stadium Villas, Summer Lakes, The Brennity at Melbourne, Three Fountains at Viera Condominiums, Villages of North Solerno, Villages of South Solerno Wickham Lakes, and Wyndham at Duran.

The North and South Villages of Solerno include Capron Trace, Charolais Estates, Chelford, Colfax Landing, Cortona, Daintree, Eason Landing, Gatwick Manor, Indigo Crossing, Levanto, Ravencliffe, Sunstone, and Terramore.

=== Viera South ===
Viera South is west of Interstate 95 and South of Wickham Road and has the communities of Avalonia, Bridgewater at Viera, Kerrington, Stonecrest, Loren Cove, Reeling Park, The Rutherford Collection at Reeling Park, Seville, Valencia, Strom Park, Trasona Cove East, Trasona Cove West, Sendero Cove, and Sierra Cove, Aripeka, Pangea Park, Laurasia, and Del Webb at Viera. Planned for development in 2024 are Crossmolina, The Landings, and Farallon Fields

== History ==
The land was developed by the Viera Company, a subsidiary of A. Duda and Sons, which owned the property formerly known as Cocoa Ranch. On August 4, 1989, they broke ground in this unincorporated area for the new community of Viera. It is derived from viera meaning 'faith' in Slovak, in honor of family patriarch Andrew Duda, who immigrated to the United States in 1912 from what became Slovakia. Starting in 1990, the Duda family started developing a new community with a mix of land uses, including a variety of housing types, offices, medical and industrial parks, shopping centers and recreational facilities. Todd Pokrywa was appointed President of The Viera Company effective September 1, 2018.

The Viera Development of Regional Impact (DRI) was approved in 1990 for about 3,000 acres (1,200 ha), making up Viera East. In 1992 construction began on what would become Viera East. In 1995, a 6,000-acre (2,400 ha) expansion was approved by Brevard County as a Substantial Deviation to the original DRI. Application was made for Substantial Deviation #2 in 2006 and was approved to plan for the final expansion of the community. The 11,567-acre (4,681 ha) expansion will include 5,112 acres (2,069 ha) to be set aside as managed protected land, conservation areas, parks and open space.

The Viera Wilderness Park (5,112 acres (2,069 ha) to be set aside during the expansion) will join with the 44,000-acre (18,000 ha) River Lakes Conservation Area, which includes 14,000 acres (5,700 ha) of Cocoa Ranch purchased by the St. Johns River Water Management District in 1999. Additional acres will be set aside within development areas to serve as conservation, parks and open space bringing the total actively managed protected land in the expansion area to over 50 percent of the total area.

== Economy ==
Viera has more than 350 businesses, including financial services, health care, and retail.

=== Retail ===
The Avenue Viera, an open-air shopping center, opened in 2004. It contains over 100 shops/restaurants with 600,000 square feet of retail/restaurant space and a multiplex movie theater. There are several nationally known restaurant chains and department stores.

=== Industry ===
Viera has several organizations, government offices and non-profits, such as the Brevard Zoo, Brevard Public Schools, the Brevard County Clerk of Courts, and Viera Hospital.

The first Park-N-Ride lot, in unincorporated Brevard County, is located there.

=== Government offices ===
The county's administration complex is located in Viera 1 mile (1.6 km) west of Interstate 95. The government branches and offices include the Brevard County Board of County Commissioners, County Manager, Planning and Development, Housing and Human Services, Public Works, Public Safety, Health Services and Clinic at Viera, Children's Medical Services, Utility Services, and the Metropolitan Planning Organization. The Harry T. and Harriette V. Moore Justice Center and the Brevard County School Board offices are also located within the administrative complex.

=== Community events ===
The developer of the property, The Viera Company, hosts a variety of events each year for both the community and for the Central Brevard area through the Viera Community Institute. Several main events include the Light Up Viera Holiday Parade, the July 4th Great American Celebration, and the Viera Nature Festival.

National charities such as the American Heart Association's Heart Walk, Making Strides Against Breast Cancer, the March of Dimes Walk for Babies, the Devereux Foundation, St. Baldrick's Foundation and the Scarecrow Stroll & Harvest Festival have achieved success in the community.

== Government ==
=== Federal representation ===
The Viera area is within Florida's 8th congressional district represented by Mike Haridopolos.

=== State representation ===
Within the boundaries of Viera, the State House (District 32) is represented by Thad Altman; the State Senate (District 17) is represented by Debbie Mayfield.

=== County ===
The Viera community is located within an unincorporated portion of Brevard County, District 4. The County Commissioner for this district is Rob Feltner. The Brevard County School Board representative is Matt Susin (also District 4).

== Community Development Districts and Master Community ==
Viera East Community Association (VECA) is a not-for-profit corporation formed in accordance with the Viera East Community Declaration and is the Master Association for Viera East. It is administered by a five-member Board of Directors and is responsible for the maintenance and upkeep of the hardscaping, landscaping and irrigation systems on most major roadways throughout Viera East, and in certain parks and recreational facilities. VECA is also responsible for overseeing the Modifications Review Committee (MRC).

The Viera East Community Development District is a local, special-purpose government entity authorized by Chapter 190 of the Florida Statutes as amended, and created by ordinance of Brevard County as an alternative method of planning, acquiring, operating and maintaining community-wide improvements in planned communities.

== Sports ==
=== Golf ===
Duran Golf Club, an 18-hole golf course, opened in 2005. It is located in Central Viera. It encompasses 130 acres (53 ha) in the neighborhoods of Fairway Lakes at Viera, Modern Duran and Wyndham at Duran. The 10,000-square-foot (930 m^{2}) British West Indies-style clubhouse contains a restaurant. The Duran Development Center includes a 30-acre (12 ha) complex with a practice range, target greens, pitching greens, a putting green, Footgolf and 9 hole par 3 course playable at night.

Viera East Golf Club opened in 1993 and is located in Viera East. It winds through the neighborhoods of Parkstone, Oakefe, Canterbury, Brightwood, Addington, Durban Park, Blackheath, Aberdeen, Woodhall, Collingtree, Stratford Place and Ashton.

=== Baseball ===
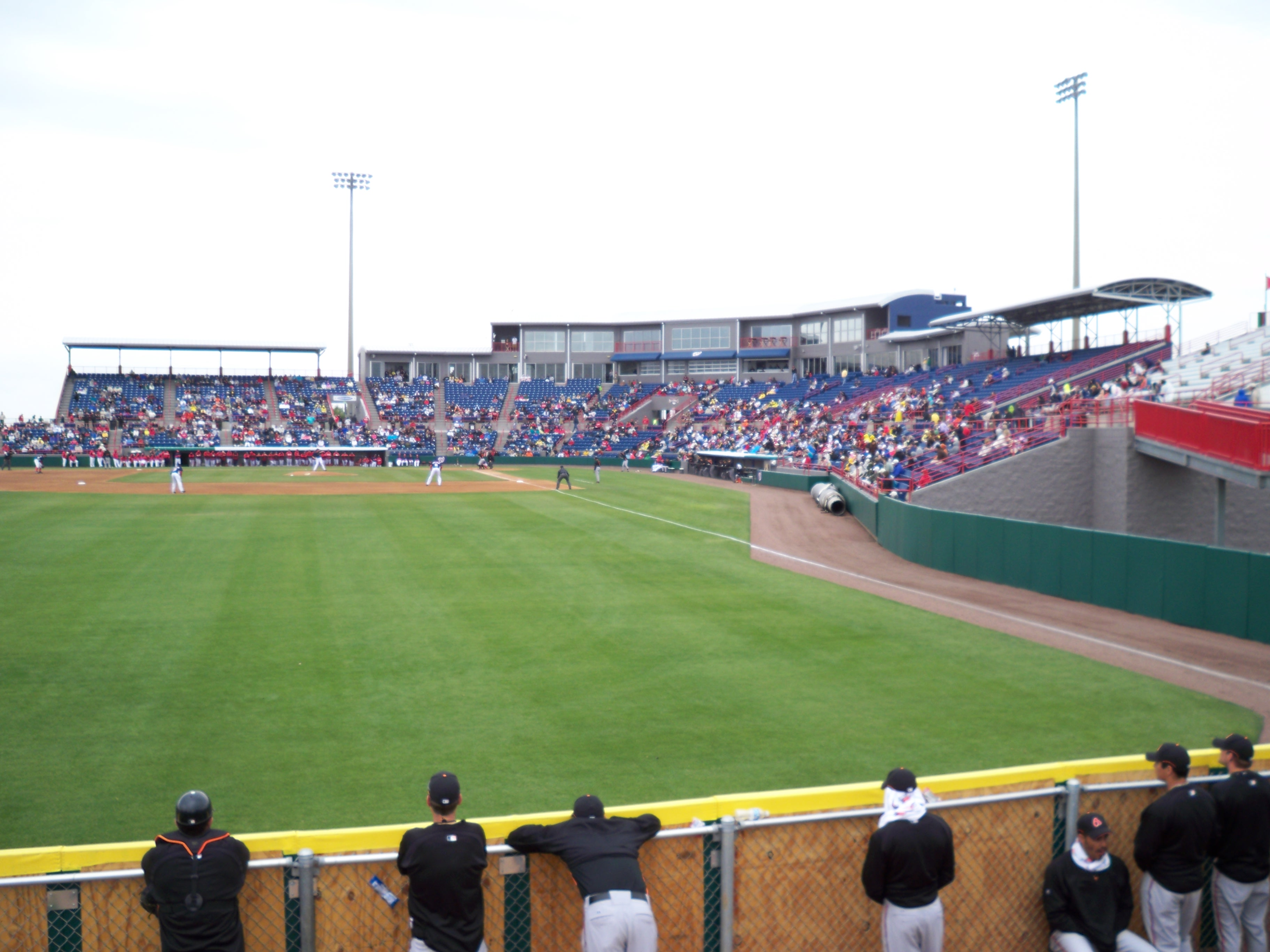
Space Coast Stadium

The USSSA (United States Specialty Sports Association) relocated to the Space Coast Stadium in 2017. The USSSA primarily focus on amateur sports involving youth baseball, and youth and adult softball.

In 2018, Viera was the host location of that year's installment of the Women's Baseball World Cup.

== Parks ==
Viera Regional Park

Constructed on 125 acres (51 ha) donated by the Viera Company, Viera Regional Park has a community center (18,000 square feet), a fully equipped playground, three tot lots, 8 acres (3.2 ha) of lakes, a walkway system, two lighted Little League baseball fields, two lighted "major league" baseball fields, eight soccer pitches (2 lighted), lighted tennis and basketball courts, and two youth softball courts.

The Suntree-Viera Lightning Mighty Mites, an under-10 football team, won the Offense-Defense National Championship in 2009.

In 2010, two soccer clubs with a total of 1,200 members vied for space on recreational ground.

The Suntree-Viera Lightning Bantams, an under-13 Football Competition team, won the OD National Championship in January 2011. In 2016, he SVYFL Hawks (14 and under) won the National Youth Football Championships.

Community parks

Viera has 13 community parks, three dog parks and a number of pocket parks within each neighborhood. In Viera East, Clubhouse Park, Suseda Park and Woodside Park have children's play equipment along with adjoining trail systems. In Viera West, Eastwind Park, Westwind Park, North Solerno Park, Palmentto Park, Woodmill Park, Viera Town Center Park, Sandhill Park, and La Roca Park contain various styles of modern play equipment. La Roca Park contains the only outdoor skating rink in the community.

== Recreation and tourism ==
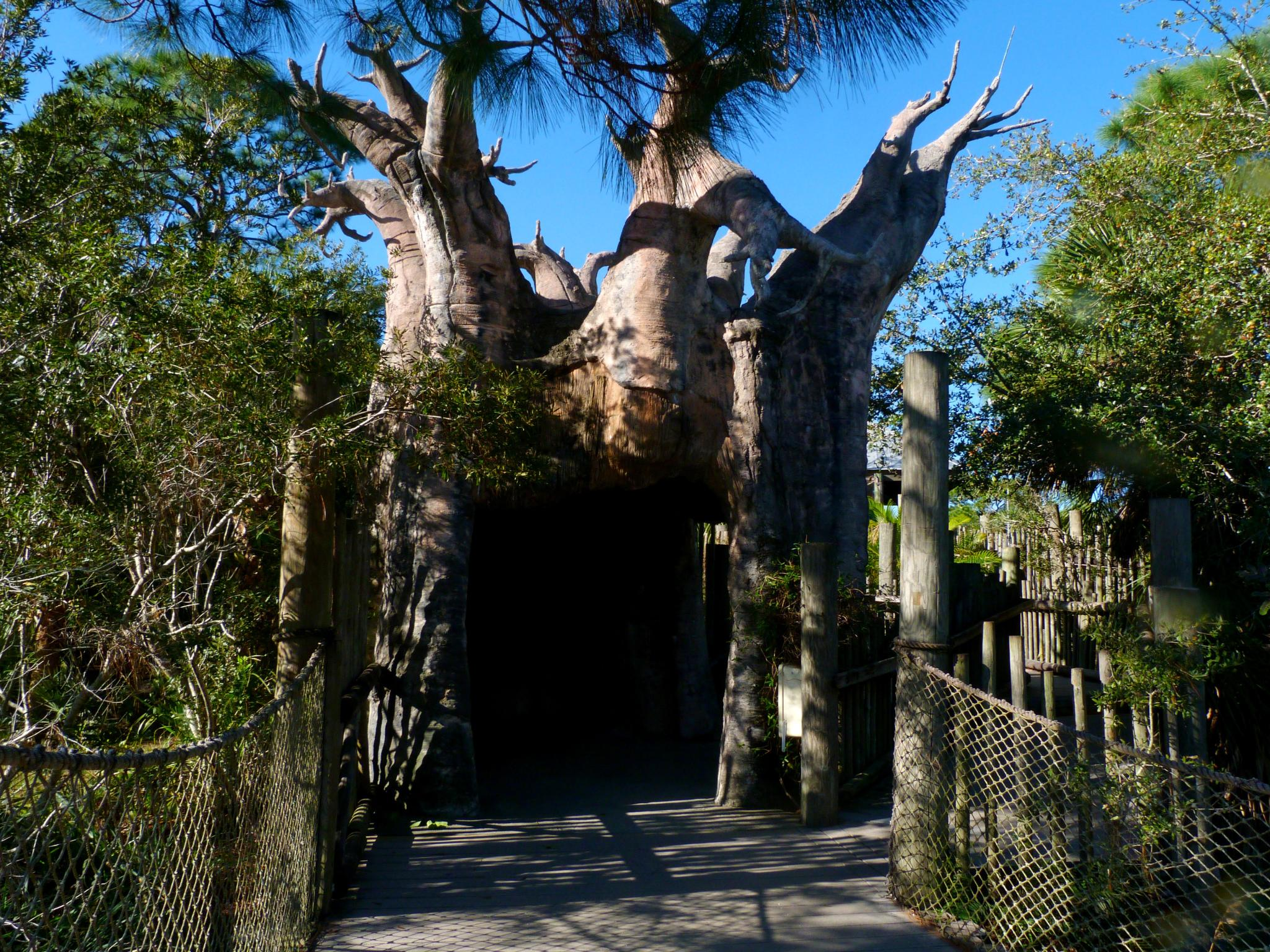
Brevard Zoo

The Brevard Zoo and the 200-acre (81 ha) Ritch Grissom Memorial Wetlands of Viera are located at the south end of the community. Viera has over 100 miles (160 km) of trails throughout the community and multiple run/walk events are held throughout the year including the Christmas Fit-mas, 3k Run Run Santa 1 Mile, Super Hero 5k, East My Crust 5k, Komodo Krawl 3k at the Brevard Zoo and Excalibur 10 Miler and Dragon Slayer 2 Miler.

== Education ==
Viera possesses four elementary schools, a charter school, two academies, and a high school. Plans for a Viera middle school have been included with the DRI plans for the community but the three feeder chain middle schools are in other areas of Brevard. Each of Viera's schools has received "A" grades since Florida's grading process started, and each has received other state and national honors as well.

- Ralph M. Williams, Jr. Elementary School
- Manatee Elementary School
- Quest Elementary School
- Viera Elementary School
- Viera Charter School K-8
- Pinecrest Academy Space Coast
- Amazing Explorers Academy Viera
- Delaura Middle School, John F. Kennedy Middle School, and Ronald McNair Magnet Middle School are the feeder chain middle schools
- Viera High School

== Public safety ==
The local Brevard County Fire Rescue station 47 is the county's Specialized Response Truck dealing with HAZMAT incidents county wide. In 2011, the county opened Station #48. This station is the county's only special operations/hazardous materials responding and training station. #48 is also home to a 9-11 memorial which includes a piece of steel from the fallen World Trade Center towers.

== Infrastructure ==
=== Sewage ===
The county's South Central Wastewater Facility is located here.

=== Irrigation ===
Since irrigation is commonplace, residents in Viera are able to irrigate properties via reclaimed water or standard city water (depending on location.)

== See also ==
- Viera East, Florida
- Viera West, Florida
