= Meadow Marsh =

Historic house in Florida, United States

- Luther F. Tilden House
- U.S. National Register of Historic Places
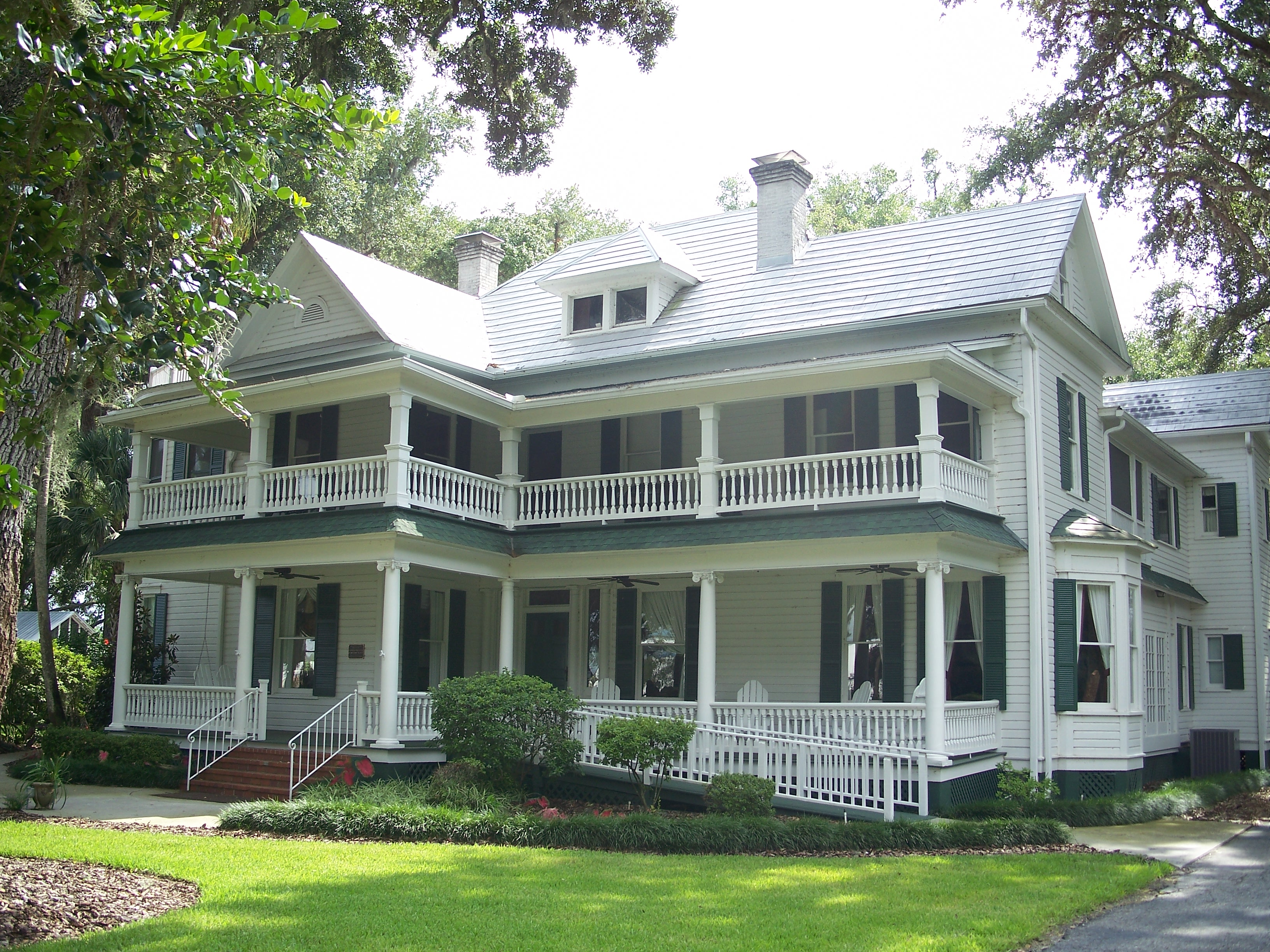

- Location within Florida Location within the United States
- Location: Winter Garden, Florida
- Coordinates: 28°33′28″N 81°36′37″W
- Area: 12 acres (4.9 ha)
- Built: 1878
- Architect: F.H. Trimble
- Architectural style: Classical Revival
- NRHP reference No.: 96001337
- Added to NRHP: November 15, 1996

Meadow Marsh, which has also been known as the Luther F. Tilden House and as the Luther W. Tilden House, is a historic home in Winter Garden, Florida, United States that is listed on the U.S. National Register of Historic Places (NRHP). It is located at 940 Tildenville School Road. The neighborhood it is located in is known as Tildenville, an unincorporated village.

The house is a Classical Revival style house that was a work of Frederick H. Trimble. Trimble is also credited with design of NRHP-listed Fellsmere Public School in Fellsmere, Florida and the NRHP-listed Vero Theatre in Vero Beach, Florida.

It was listed on the NRHP as Luther F. Tilden House in 1996. The listing included four contributing buildings on 12 acres (4.9 ha).

According to a historic site webpage, it was built by Luther Willis Tilden, the son of Luther Fuller Tilden.

Luther Tilden was a pioneer in citrus cultivation in Florida.
