= Tara, Florida =

Unincorporated community in Florida, U.S.

Coordinates: 27.4368°N 82.4653°W

Tara is an unincorporated area in Manatee County, Florida, United States. Tara is a planned community platted and constructed beginning in 1988 by Lake Lincoln LLC, (formerly Tara-Manatee Inc.), owned by William Higgs of Naples.

== History ==
Construction on the 1,100-acre site began in 1988. The development project consisted of a golf course, residential homes, retail and commercial properties. Tara Golf & Country Club was the first stage of development, including single-family homes, veranda-style condos, multi-story terrace condos with elevator access, and paired villas. Country Club membership was mandatory and was included with each lot or parcel.

In 1992, a shopping center and elementary school were built in Tara.
