= Tildenville, Florida =

Unincorporated area in Florida, US

- Census-designated place
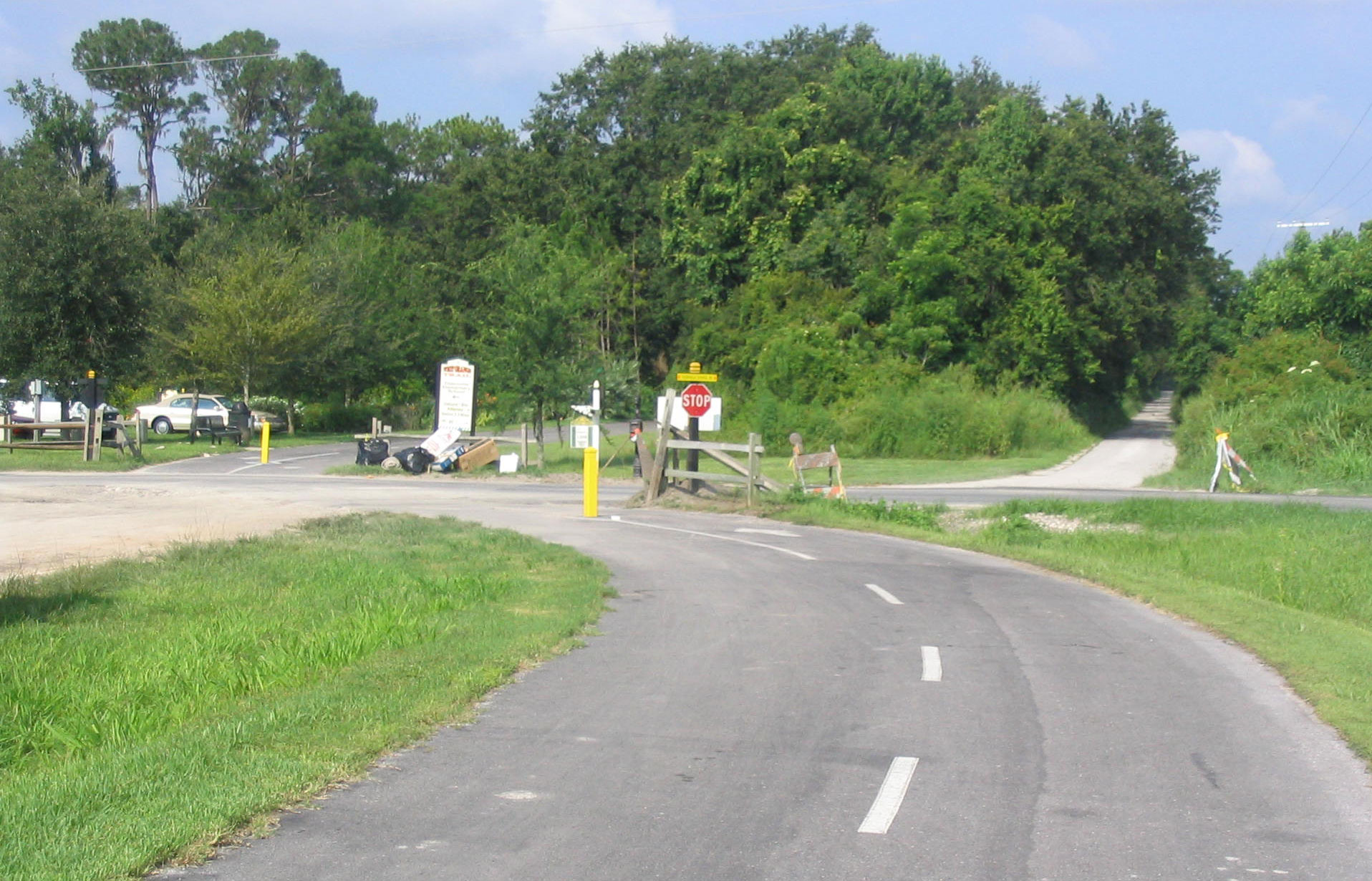
- The West Orange Trail in Tildenville in 2005

- Location in Orange County and the state of Florida
- Coordinates: 28°32′31″N 81°36′14″W
- Country: United States
- State: Florida
- County: Orange

Area
  - Total: 0.24 sq mi (0.62 km^{2})
  - Land: 0.21 sq mi (0.54 km^{2})
  - Water: 0.031 sq mi (0.08 km^{2})
- Elevation: 102 ft (31 m)

Population (2020)
  - Total: 475
  - Density: 2,288.5/sq mi (883.59/km^{2})
- Time zone: UTC-5 (Eastern (EST))
  - Summer (DST): UTC-4 (EDT)
- ZIP code: 34787
- Area code: 321
- FIPS code: 12-71850
- GNIS feature ID: 2402932

Tildenville is a census-designated place (CDP) and an unincorporated area in Orange County, Florida, United States. As of the 2020 census, Tildenville had a population of 475. In 2010, most residents were African American. It is part of the Orlando–Kissimmee Metropolitan Statistical Area. Generally speaking, Tildenville is a narrow area alongside Orange County Road 545, south of Florida State Road 50 and north of the Stoneybrook West planned unit development. Residents utilize Winter Garden, Florida for mail delivery. The CDP takes its name from Luther F. Tilden, a prominent pioneer and citrus magnate who greatly contributed to the community. Historically, Tildenville referred to an area larger than the modern CDP. Landmarks such as Tildenville Elementary School, Tildenville Marketplace, and Meadow Marsh are now located within the city limits of Winter Garden.

== Geography ==
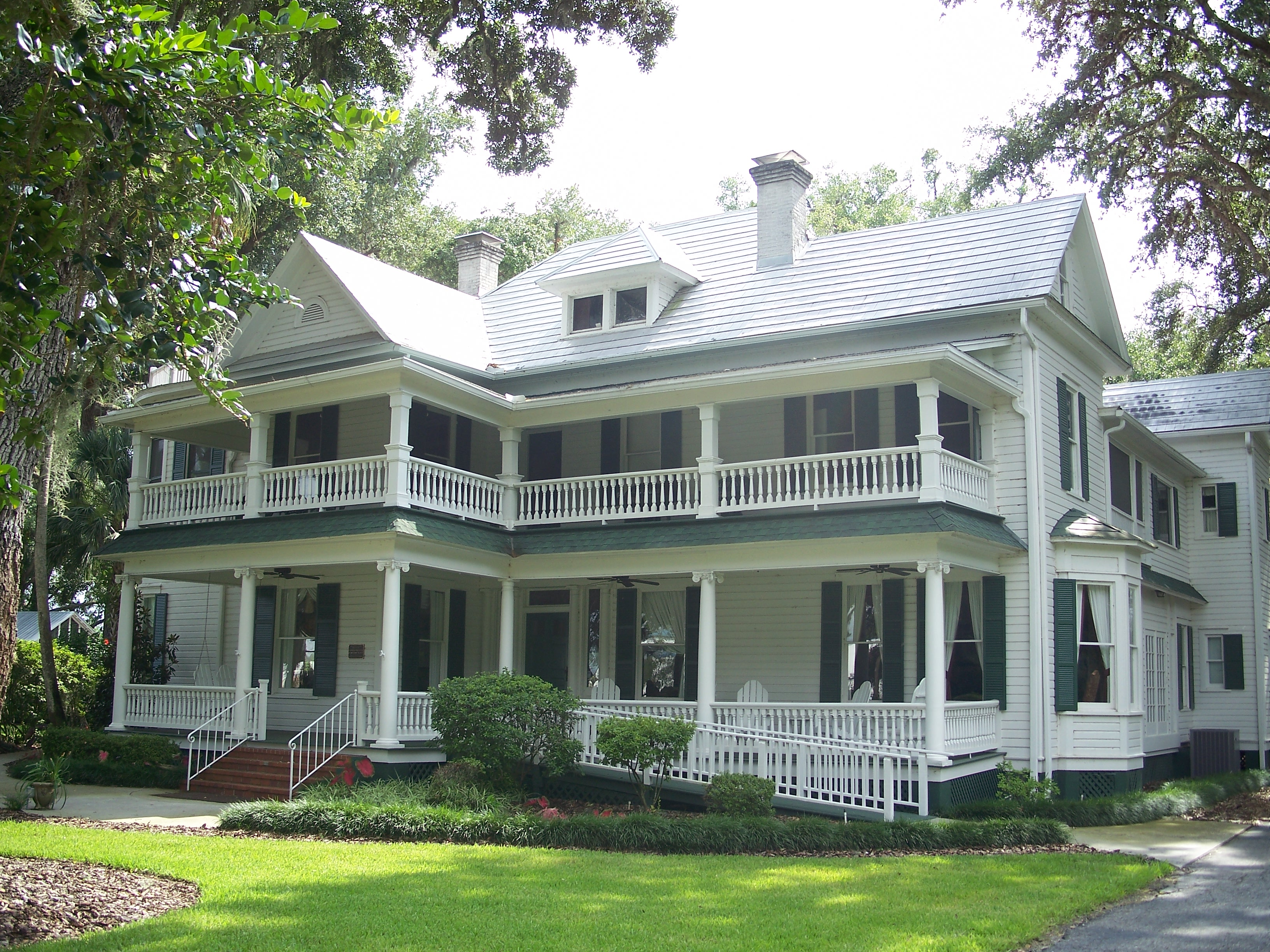
The Luther F. Tilden House in Tildenville, now in the Winter Garden city limits.

According to the United States Census Bureau, the CDP has a total area of 1.1 km^{2} (0.4 mi^{2}), of which 0.9 km^{2} (0.3 mi^{2}) is land and 0.2 km^{2} (0.1 mi^{2}) (14.63%) is water.

== Demographics ==
Historical population
Census	Pop.	Note	%±
2000	513		—
2010	511		−0.4%
2020	475		−7.0%
U.S. Decennial Census

=== 2020 census ===
Tildenville CDP, Florida – Racial and ethnic composition Note: the US Census treats Hispanic/Latino as an ethnic category. This table excludes Latinos from the racial categories and assigns them to a separate category. Hispanics/Latinos may be of any race.
Race / Ethnicity (NH = Non-Hispanic)	Pop 2000	Pop 2010	Pop 2020	% 2000	% 2010	% 2020
White alone (NH)	32	42	62	6.24%	8.22%	13.05%
Black or African American alone (NH)	412	397	275	80.31%	77.69%	57.89%
Native American or Alaska Native alone (NH)	0	0	1	0.00%	0.00%	0.21%
Asian alone (NH)	0	10	37	0.00%	1.96%	8.00%
Native Hawaiian or Pacific Islander alone (NH)	0	0	0	0.00%	0.00%	0.00%
Other race alone (NH)	1	0	1	0.19%	0.00%	0.21%
Mixed race or Multiracial (NH)	7	9	23	1.36%	1.76%	4.84%
Hispanic or Latino (any race)	61	53	75	1.36%	10.37%	15.79%
Total	513	511	475	100.00%	100.00%	100.00%

At the 2000 census, there were 513 people, 169 households and 129 families residing in the CDP. The population density was 565.9/km^{2} (1,465.7/mi^{2}). There were 180 housing units at an average density of 198.6/km^{2} (514.3/mi^{2}). The racial makeup of the CDP was 13.84% White, 80.51% African American, 3.51% from other races and 2.14% from two or more races. Hispanic or Latino of any race were 11.89% of the population.

There were 169 households, of which 34.9% had children under the age of 18 living with them, 41.4% were married couples living together, 30.8% had a female householder with no husband present, and 23.1% were non-families. 17.2% of all households were made up of individuals, and 5.3% had someone living alone who was 65 years of age or older. The average household size was 3.04 and the average family size was 3.42.

32.4% of the population were under the age of 18, 8.0% from 18 to 24, 30.8% from 25 to 44, 23.0% from 45 to 64, and 5.8% who were 65 years of age or older. The median age was 31 years. For every 100 females, there were 95.1 males. For every 100 females age 18 and over, there were 92.8 males.

The median household income was $36,250 and the median family income was $38,438. Males had a median income of $26,500 and females $20,893. The per capita income for the CDP was $11,488. About 10.5% of families and 11.7% of the population were below the poverty line, including 8.2% of those under age 18 and none of those age 65 or over.

== Education ==
Orange County Public Schools operates public schools in the county. Zoned schools include:

- Sunridge Elementary School
- Sunridge Middle School
- West Orange High School
- Tilldenville Elementary School
- Lakeview Middle School

At one point it was zoned to Whispering Oak Elementary School.
