= Winter Garden Heritage Foundation =

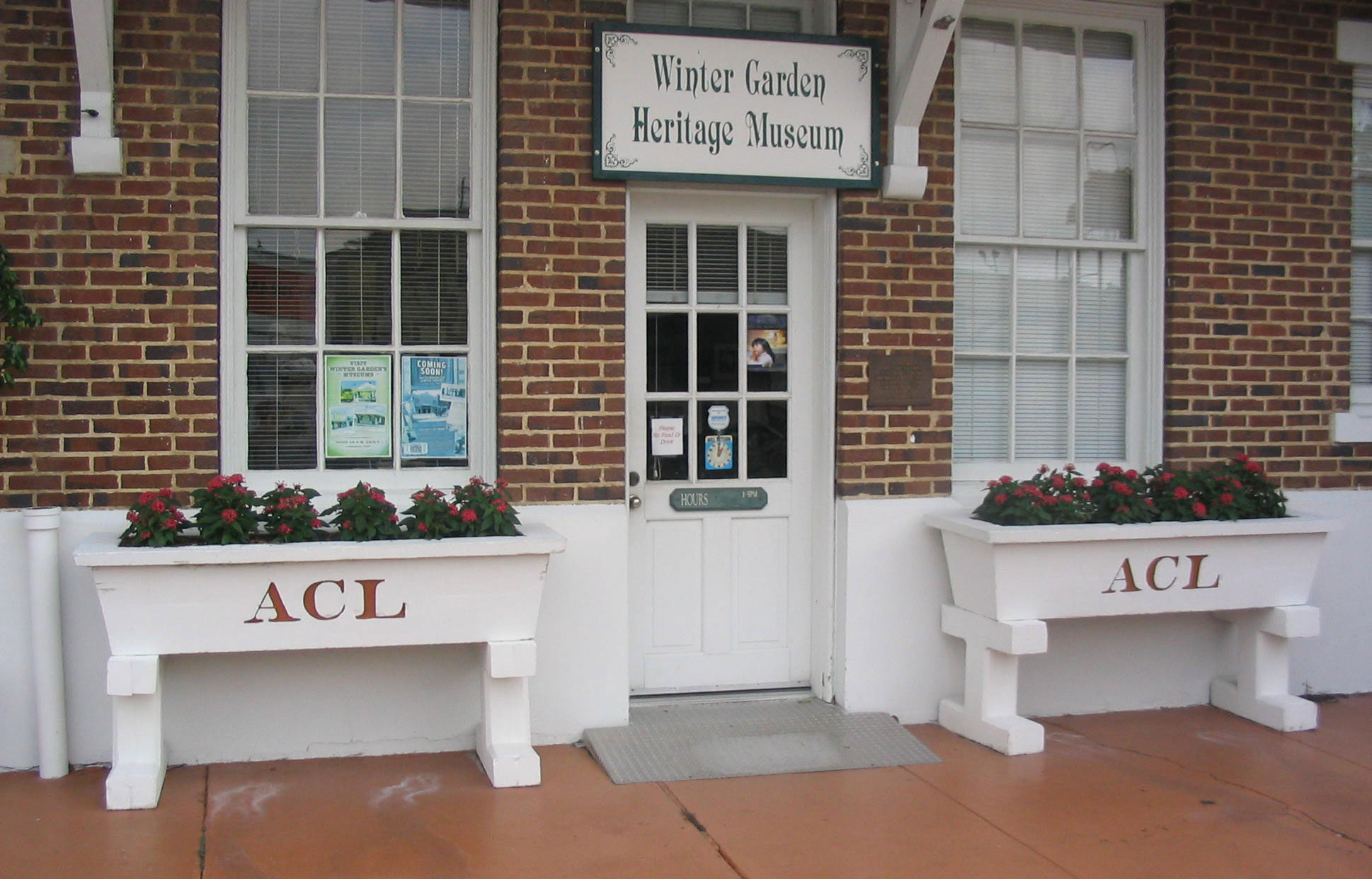
- Former ACL Depot, now the Winter Garden Heritage Museum headquarters.

- Location within Florida
- Location: Winter Garden, Florida
- Coordinates: 28.564849°N 81.586168°W
- Website: www.wghf.org

The Winter Garden Heritage Foundation (WGHF) is an organization dedicated to preserving history for the communities of West Orange County, Florida.

== Overview ==
The Winter Garden Heritage Foundation, located at 21 East Plant Street in Winter Garden, Florida's Downtown Historic District, operates two museums in Winter Garden, Florida: the Winter Garden Heritage Museum and the Central Florida Railroad Museum. The History Research, Education, and Visitors' Center is the headquarters for the foundation and contains its administrative offices. It also features a gift shop.

Activities of the WGHF include the identification, documentation, evaluation, and protection of West Orange County's cultural and physical history and character. Public education in the form of a fully accredited school visitation program, historic walking tours, heritage events, workshops, displays, written resource materials, and Facebook Live presentations.

== Winter Garden Heritage Museum ==
The Winter Garden Heritage Museum is located in the 1923 Atlantic Coast Line train depot in downtown Winter Garden. The museum focuses on the history and culture of the area, with exhibits including local citrus labels, artifacts left behind by the region's indigenous people, railroad memorabilia, and historic photographs. New exhibits are presented three times each year.

== Central Florida Railroad Museum ==
The Winter Garden Heritage Foundation also maintains a close working relationship with this museum, located nearby at 101 South Boyd Street in the 1913 Tavares & Gulf Railroad depot. It is a world-class museum that exhibits photographs and artifacts that cover Central Florida's storied railroading history. Maps, brochures, diagrams, and an extensive collection of railroad china and crystal draw visitors from all over the world.

== Garden Theatre ==
In 2008, the Winter Garden Heritage Foundation completed the restoration of the Garden Theatre, located at 160 West Plant Street in historic downtown Winter Garden, Florida. Originally operated as a movie theatre, it opened in 1935. The interior was complete with a Spanish tile courtyard, "Romeo and Juliet" balconies, and lanterns in the windows over the proscenium arch with palm trees decorating either side of it. The ceiling of the theatre was dark blue, resplendent with stars. Several renovations changed the face of the theatre until it closed in 1963, as movie attendance declined in the new age of television. The foundation acquired the building on January 1, 2004, through an operating agreement with the City of Winter Garden.

The foundation's goal and vision was two-fold. The first goal was to restore this historic building to its original architectural integrity, in keeping with the character and revitalization of historic downtown Winter Garden, making the building an authentic period piece. The second was to become the heartbeat of the city as a performing arts center, movie theatre, and multi-purpose venue. These goals were accomplished and the theater became a 501c(3) non-profit that operates independently of the Winter Garden Heritage Foundation.
