= Viera East, Florida =

- CDP
- Interactive map of Viera East, Florida
- Coordinates: 28°15′12″N 80°42′48″W
- Country: United States
- State: Florida
- County: Brevard

Area
  - Total: 5.18 sq mi (13.42 km^{2})
  - Land: 5.06 sq mi (13.10 km^{2})
  - Water: 0.12 sq mi (0.32 km^{2})
- Elevation: 26 ft (7.9 m)

Population (2020)
  - Total: 11,687
  - Density: 2,310.4/sq mi (892.06/km^{2})
- Time zone: UTC-5 (Eastern (EST))
  - Summer (DST): UTC-4 (EDT)
- FIPS code: 12-74368
- GNIS feature ID: 2583386

Viera East is a census-designated place (CDP) in Brevard County, Florida, United States. The population was 11,687 at the 2020 census, up from 10,757 at the 2010 census. It forms a part of the larger unincorporated community of Viera and is part of the Palm Bay–Melbourne–Titusville Metropolitan, Florida Statistical Area.

== Geography ==
Viera East is located to the east of Interstate 95.

According to the United States Census Bureau, the CDP has a total area of 5.1 square miles (13.2 km^{2}), of which 5.1 square miles (13.1 km^{2}) is land and 0.02 square miles (0.04 km^{2}), or 0.31%, is water.

== Demographics ==
Historical population
| Census | Pop. | Note | %± |
|---|---|---|---|
| 2010 | 10,757 | | — |
| 2020 | 11,687 | | 8.6% |
U.S. Decennial Census

Viera East first appeared as a census designated place in the 2010 U.S. census.

=== 2020 census ===
As of the 2020 census, the median age was 51.9 years. 17.6% of residents were under the age of 18 and 31.8% of residents were 65 years of age or older. For every 100 females there were 90.3 males, and for every 100 females age 18 and over there were 88.0 males age 18 and over.

100.0% of residents lived in urban areas, while 0.0% lived in rural areas.

As of the 2020 census, there were 5,069 households in Viera East, of which 23.1% had children under the age of 18 living in them. Of all households, 55.4% were married-couple households, 14.3% were households with a male householder and no spouse or partner present, and 26.1% were households with a female householder and no spouse or partner present. About 27.5% of all households were made up of individuals and 15.3% had someone living alone who was 65 years of age or older.

As of the 2020 census, there were 5,312 housing units, of which 4.6% were vacant. The homeowner vacancy rate was 1.2% and the rental vacancy rate was 7.0%.

Racial composition as of the 2020 census
| Race | Number | Percent |
|---|---|---|
| White | 9,011 | 77.1% |
| Black or African American | 652 | 5.6% |
| American Indian and Alaska Native | 38 | 0.3% |
| Asian | 447 | 3.8% |
| Native Hawaiian and Other Pacific Islander | 1 | 0.0% |
| Some other race | 279 | 2.4% |
| Two or more races | 1,259 | 10.8% |
| Hispanic or Latino (of any race) | 1,259 | 10.8% |

== See also ==
- Viera, Florida
- Viera West, Florida
