= Garden Theatre (Winter Garden, Florida) =

Theater in Winter Garden, Florida, US

Coordinates: 28.5650°N 81.5874°W

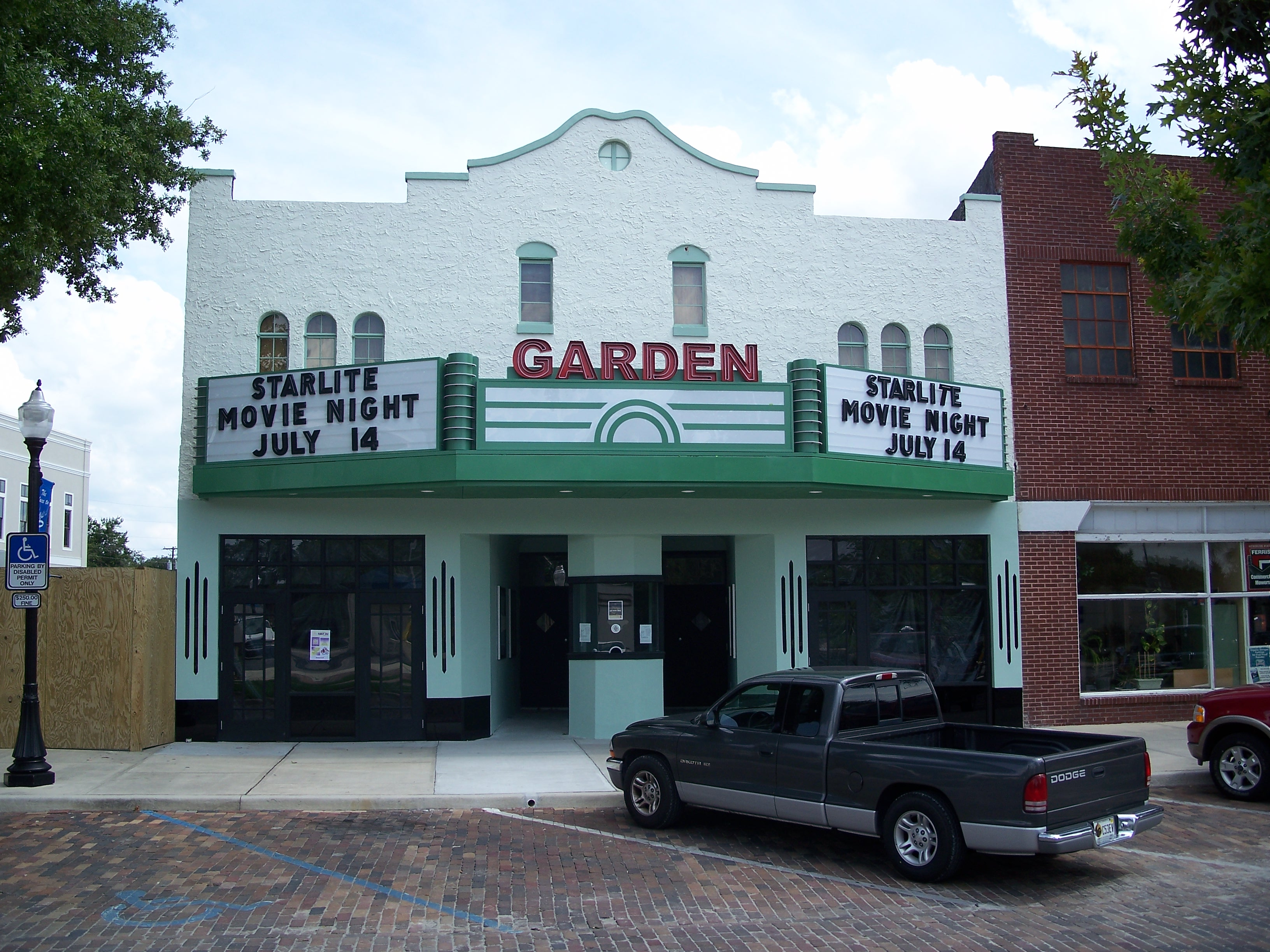
- Garden Theatre, 2007
- Interactive map of Garden Theatre
- Address: 160 West Plant Street; Winter Garden, Florida; USA
- Operator: Winter Garden Heritage Foundation

Construction
- Opened: December 1935
- Renovated: 2002

The Garden Theatre on Plant is a refurbished, historic theatre located at 160 West Plant Street in Winter Garden, Florida, United States. The Garden Theatre, which hosts over 200 events a season, including professional level theatre, music, dance, and films. The Garden Theatre serves as the primary performing arts center for the Winter Garden area.

== History ==
The theatre first opened in December 1935 as a single screen cinema and was the first in Central Florida built for "talkies". Several renovations changed the face of the theatre until it closed in 1963, as movie attendance declined in the new age of television. Soon after, the site became a farming supply store, where the interior seating was removed and the sloped floor was filled and leveled with cement.

In 2002 the City of Winter Garden purchased the site and the Winter Garden Heritage Foundation, a 501(c)(3) non-profit organization, began restoration of the theatre.

== Theater architecture ==
The Winter Garden Heritage Foundation acquired the building January 1, 2004, through an operating agreement with the City of Winter Garden.

The warmly-lit interior of the 299-seat theatre has Mediterranean Revival architecture with a Spanish tile courtyard, "Romeo and Juliet" balconies, and lanterns in the windows over the proscenium arch with palm trees decorating either side of it. The theatre newly features a 12 ft × 24 ft (3.7 m × 7.3 m) screen with a digital projector and a full-service box office and concession stand. The ceiling of the theatre was dark blue, resplendent with stars.

In 2008, the Winter Garden Heritage Foundation completed the restoration of the Garden Theatre. Restoration brought the Garden Theatre back to its original architectural simplicity, in keeping with the character and revitalization of historic downtown Winter Garden, making the building an authentic period piece.
