= Viera West, Florida =

- CDP
- Interactive map of Viera West, Florida
- Coordinates: 28°15′05″N 80°44′48″W
- Country: {United States
- State: Florida
- County: Brevard

Area
  - Total: 9.24 sq mi (23.93 km^{2})
  - Land: 9.10 sq mi (23.58 km^{2})
  - Water: 0.13 sq mi (0.34 km^{2})
- Elevation: 26 ft (7.9 m)

Population (2020)
  - Total: 16,688
  - Density: 1,832.8/sq mi (707.66/km^{2})
- Time zone: UTC-5 (Eastern (EST))
  - Summer (DST): UTC-4 (EDT)
- FIPS code: 12-74370
- GNIS feature ID: 2583387

Viera West is a census-designated place (CDP) in Brevard County, Florida, United States. The population was 16,688 at the 2020 census, up from 6,641 at the 2010 census. It forms a part of the larger unincorporated community of Viera and is part of the Palm Bay–Melbourne–Titusville, Florida Metropolitan Statistical Area.

== Geography ==
Viera West is located to the west of Interstate 95.

According to the United States Census Bureau, the CDP has a total area of 9.0 square miles (23.4 km^{2}), of which 8.9 square miles (23.1 km^{2}) is land and 0.12 square miles (0.3 km^{2}), or 1.47%, is water.

== Demographics ==
Historical population
Census	Pop.	Note	%±
2010	6,641		—
2020	16,688		151.3%
U.S. Decennial Census

Viera West first appeared as a census designated place in the 2010 U.S. census.

=== 2020 census ===
As of the 2020 census, Viera West had a population of 16,688. The median age was 45.2 years. 23.4% of residents were under the age of 18 and 24.7% of residents were 65 years of age or older. For every 100 females there were 93.0 males, and for every 100 females age 18 and over there were 89.7 males age 18 and over.

99.9% of residents lived in urban areas, while 0.1% lived in rural areas.

There were 6,541 households in Viera West, of which 30.7% had children under the age of 18 living in them. Of all households, 64.1% were married-couple households, 11.9% were households with a male householder and no spouse or partner present, and 20.2% were households with a female householder and no spouse or partner present. About 23.1% of all households were made up of individuals and 12.3% had someone living alone who was 65 years of age or older.

There were 7,118 housing units, of which 8.1% were vacant. The homeowner vacancy rate was 2.5% and the rental vacancy rate was 11.5%.

Racial composition as of the 2020 census
Race	Number	Percent
White	12,440	74.5%
Black or African American	758	4.5%
American Indian and Alaska Native	39	0.2%
Asian	1,115	6.7%
Native Hawaiian and Other Pacific Islander	15	0.1%
Some other race	393	2.4%
Two or more races	1,928	11.6%
Hispanic or Latino (of any race)	1,963	11.8%

== See also ==
- Viera, Florida
- Viera East, Florida
