= Brevard County, Florida =

County in Florida, United States

- County
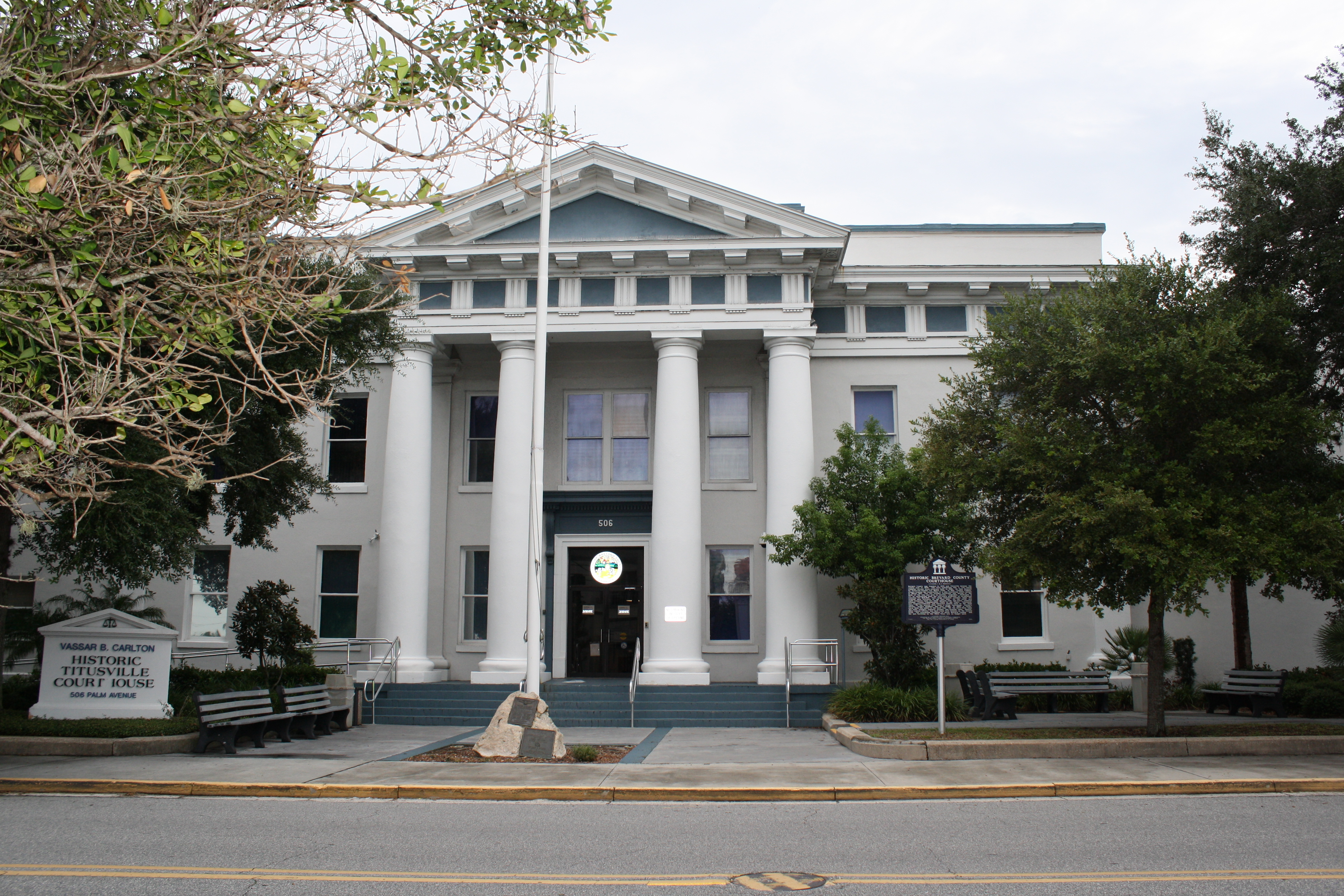
- Historic Brevard County Courthouse in Titusville.

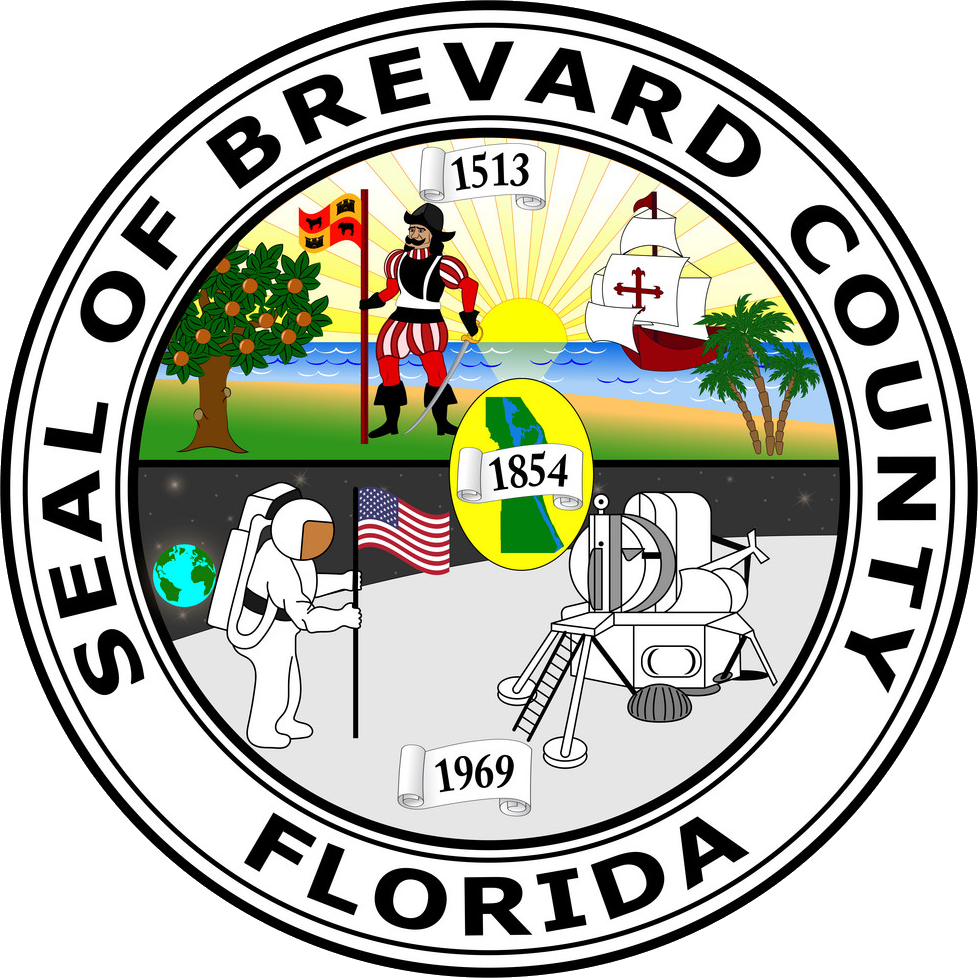
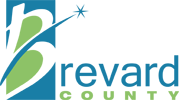
- Flag Seal Logo

- Location within the U.S. state of Florida
- Coordinates: 28.30°N 80.70°W
- Country: United States
- State: Florida
- Founded: March 14, 1844
- Named for: Theodorus W. Brevard
- Seat: Titusville
- Largest city: Palm Bay

Area
  - Total: 1,557 sq mi (4,030 km^{2})
  - Land: 1,016 sq mi (2,630 km^{2})
  - Water: 541 sq mi (1,400 km^{2}) 34.8%

Population (2020)
  - Total: 606,612
  - Estimate (2025): 663,982 ▲
  - Density: 597.1/sq mi (230.5/km^{2})
- Time zone: UTC−5 (Eastern)
  - Summer (DST): UTC−4 (EDT)
- Congressional district: 8th
- Website: brevardfl.gov

Brevard County (Note: /brəˈvɑːrd/, /ˈbrɛvərd/; brə-VARD, BREV-ərd) is located in the U.S. state of Florida. It is on the Atlantic coast of eastern Central Florida. As of the 2020 census, the population was 606,612, making it the 10th-most populated county in Florida. The official county seat is located in Titusville. A secondary center of county administration, including a circuit courthouse, was built in 1989 in the planned community of Viera, Florida, the geographic center of the county.

== History ==
The first Paleoindians arrived in the area near Brevard county between 12,000 and 10,000 years ago. Before the arrival of non-indigenous settlers in the 16th century, the area was inhabited by Native Americans. The county is the site of the Windover Archeological Site, which contained evidence of habitation over 7,000 years ago. Brevard County was established in 1855 and is named after Theodore Washington Brevard, an early Florida settler and state comptroller. The county's boundaries were changed and reduced numerous times, resulting in the current boundary since 1907.

The Paleoindians were semi-nomadic people who lived in smaller groups. After a few thousand years, a new group of settlers appeared known as "the archaic people." These people were primarily fishermen, as opposed to the hunting and gathering way of life which characterized the Paleoindians. The Windover Archeological Site, discovered in 1982, was found during excavation to have the largest collection of human remains and artifacts of the early Archaic Period (6,000–5,000 BC), or more than 8,000 years ago. It has been designated as a National Historic Landmark. The Windover pond, which would have been a woody marsh at the time, was used by the Archaic Floridians as a burial ground, with the bodies being wrapped in fabric and submerged in the peaty soil. The pond was used for interments for around a thousand years (circa 8,000–7,000 BC).

The Ais and the Jaega were the dominant tribes in the area when it is thought that Ponce De Leon landed on the shores near Melbourne Beach in 1513. There were about 10,000 of these natives in the area. Pedro Menéndez de Avilés gave an early account of the Ais people in 1570 when he was shipwrecked off of Cape Canaveral. He faced hostile natives but through the use of a bluff was able to escape from them and get back to St. Augustine. In 1605, Alvero Mexia was dispatched from St. Augustine to the Indian River area on a diplomatic mission to the Ais Indian Nation. He helped establish a "Period of Friendship" with the Ais Caciques(Chiefs) and made a color map of the area.

During the 19th century, the state of Florida frequently changed the names and borders of counties. St. Lucie County was split off from Mosquito County in 1844. St. Lucie County was renamed Brevard County in 1855 after Theodore Washington Brevard, who served as Florida Comptroller from 1854 to 1860. This "Brevard County" contained very little of present-day Brevard County. Most of present-day Brevard north of Melbourne was part of either Volusia or Orange counties. Brevard County in 1856 extended as far west as Polk County and as far south as coastal Dade County. Complicating the discussion of Brevard County in the 19th century is that the boundaries have shifted such that the southernmost parts of present-day Brevard, were originally the northernmost parts. The original county seat was located at Susannah, an early name for present day Fort Pierce. Later the southern part of Brevard split off to form a new county, St. Lucie County in 1905. Gradually, the borders of Brevard County were shifted northward while the county got "pinched" eastward. The portions of Brevard County in present-day Broward and Palm Beach counties were given to Dade County, western areas of the county were given to Polk and Osceola County, and parts of Volusia and Orange Counties were given to Brevard including the eventual county seat of Titusville. Later, the southern portion of the county was cut off to form St. Lucie County, which in turn spawned Martin and Indian River County.

The first concerted development the area occurred with the extension of Henry Flagler's Florida East Coast Railroad into the area. The railroad reached Titusville in 1886 and Melbourne in 1894. With the railroad came increased settlement and the first tourists. The first major land boom began in the 1920s after the end of World War I. People flooded into the state of Florida, both tourists from northern winters and new full-time residents, and land prices soared. The Great Depression temporarily stopped growth in Florida. Before the start of World War II, the largest industries in Brevard were commercial fishing, citrus, and tourism.

Beginning in the 1930s, Harry T. Moore was a civil rights leader, teacher, and founder of the Brevard County NAACP. After the war he became president of the state NAACP. After the Supreme Court had ruled in 1944 that white primaries were unconstitutional, he conducted voter registration drives and succeeded in registering 31% of black voters in Florida, a higher percentage than in any other southern state. The white establishment resisted, firing both him and his wife Harriette in 1946 from their teaching positions. On Christmas night, 1951, a bomb exploded under their home, fatally injuring both of them. Four separate investigations were conducted, including the first by the FBI in 1951–1952, and the last in 2005 by the state. No one was ever prosecuted.

In 1940, the United States federal government built Naval Air Station Banana River. In 1950 it became Patrick Air Force Base and it was renamed to Patrick Space Force Base on December 9, 2020 as part of the establishment of the U.S. Space Force. This military installation was the first of major federal investment in projects to aid the development of Brevard County. In the late 1950s, the government opened the Long Range Proving Ground. This later became the Kennedy Space Center. The establishment of the Kennedy Space Center, originally known as Launch Operations Center, significantly impacted the area's identity and prominence, it attracted more educated workers and scientists associated with the program. In 1962, NASA acquired more than 200 square miles (518 square km) of land on Merritt Island to facilitate the recently announced lunar program of operations. The preceding year, U.S. Pres. John F. Kennedy had pledged to get the first American astronaut on the Moon by 1970. The Launch Operations Center name was changed to honor President Kennedy following his assassination in 1963. Work immediately began on a new launch complex—Launch Complex 39. In addition, the Vehicle Assembly Building, for the construction of spacecraft, was built by 1966. The first launch from the new facility was the Saturn V rocket launch of the Apollo 4 mission on November 9, 1967. Twelve more Saturn V launches followed, including the historic Apollo 11 mission in 1969 that landed astronauts Neil Armstrong and Buzz Aldrin on the Moon. The final Saturn V launch, in 1973, carried the Skylab space station to orbit. The launch complex was then adapted for the space shuttle program, and each shuttle, from 1981 until the final mission in 2011, launched from this complex [Britannica]. Beginning in the 1960s, new bridges were constructed across the waterways designed as high-rise steel, designed to be high enough to allow passage of boats underneath. Brevard County is known as the Space Coast due to the influence of the John F. Kennedy Space Center and the aerospace industry on its economy. As such, it was designated with the telephone area code 321, as in "3, 2, 1 liftoff". The county has several incorporated cities and towns, primarily along the coast of the Atlantic Ocean and is mostly suburban west of Interstate 95. Brevard County comprises the Cities of Palm Bay– Melbourne– Titusville, FL Metropolitan Statistical Area.

Attributed to the length of the county, people in the southern portion of the county complained about being so distant from the county seat. The county seat of Titusville was 50 miles (80 km) from Palm Bay. Palm Bay is the largest city in Brevard County and the second largest in Central Florida, by population. The county decided to build a new county administration complex at Viera near the geographical center of the county. This complex was started in 1989 and completed in 1994. Residents in the north threatened secession. Their proposal to form a new county, to be called Playalinda, had some momentum in the early 90s. The county made a few concessions to the people in the northern part of the county, and agreed not to officially move the county seat. Since construction of the new center, Viera has been for all intents and purposes the de facto seat of Brevard County.

Between November 1st and 2nd of 2026, record rainfall caused by a low pressure system caused major flooding in the southern part of the county, with areas reaching more than 20 inches of rain. Grant-Valkaria in particular had nearly 25 inches at its most. Two are confirmed to be deceased at this time.

== Geography ==
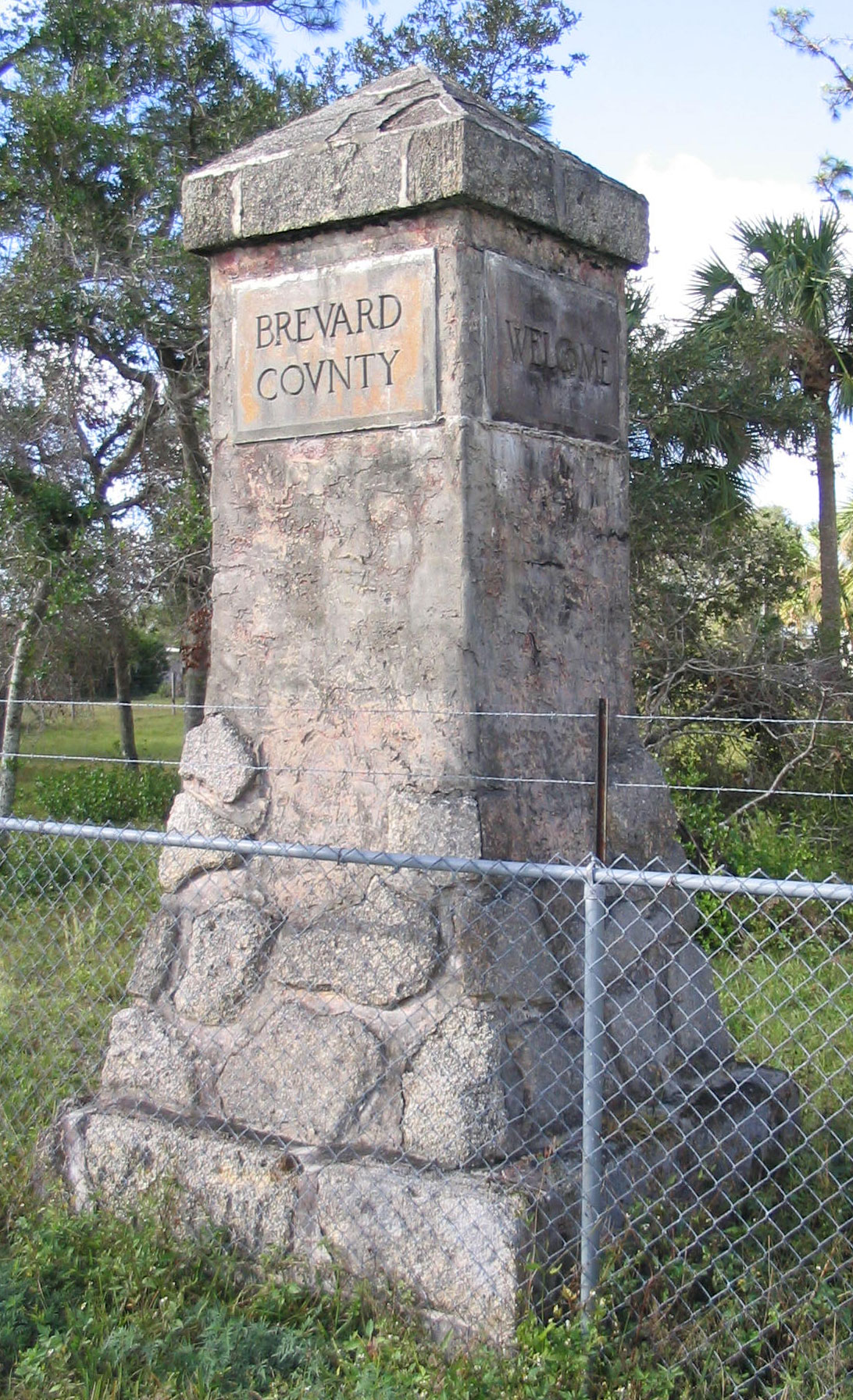
The Brevard–Volusia county line

According to the U.S. Census Bureau, the county has a total area of 1,557 square miles (4,030 km^{2}), of which 1,016 square miles (2,630 km^{2}) is land and 541 square miles (1,400 km^{2}) (34.8%) is water. Most of the water is the Atlantic Ocean, the St. Johns River and the Indian River Lagoon. The county is larger in area than the nation of Samoa and nearly the same size, and population, as Cape Verde.

Located halfway between Jacksonville and Miami, Brevard County extends 72 miles (116 km) from north to south, and averages 26.5 miles (42.6 km) wide. Emphasizing the position halfway down Florida are two state roads that have been numbered at the midpoint of Florida's numbering system, State Road 50 and State Road 500. Marshes in the western part of this county, together with those in neighboring Indian River country, are the source of the St. Johns River, which becomes navigable within the county.

The Atlantic Intracoastal Waterway along the eastern edge of Brevard County is the major waterway route in Brevard County. It includes the Indian River. Additional waterways include Lake Washington, Lake Poinsett, Lake Winder, Sawgrass Lake, the St. Johns River, and the Banana River. Dredging for the Intracoastal created 41 spoil islands in the Brevard portion of the Indian River.

Brevard County is the sole county in the Palm Bay-Melbourne-Titusville, Florida Metropolitan Statistical Area (MSA). Palm Bay, Melbourne, and Titusville are designated as principal cities in the MSA. The MSA was created as the Melbourne-Titusville-Cocoa, Florida Standard MSA in 1972, renamed the Melbourne-Titusville-Palm Bay, Florida MSA in 1983, and given its current title in 2003.

The county is unofficially divided into three sections: North County, comprising Titusville, Mims and Port St. John; Central Brevard, which includes Cocoa, Rockledge, Merritt Island, and Cocoa Beach; and South County, which includes Melbourne, Palm Bay, Grant-Valkaria, and the South Beaches. There are also several beaches along the coast of the county. The North Reach includes 9.4 miles (15.1 km) of coastline from Cape Canaveral, through Cocoa Beach, to Patrick Space Force Base. The Patrick Space Force Base beach is 4.1 miles (6.6 km) long. South of Patrick SFB, the Mid Reach includes the 7.6 miles (12.2 km) of coastline in Satellite Beach. The South Reach includes 3.8 miles (6.1 km) of beach in the communities of Indialantic and Melbourne Beach. At the southern end of the county, the South Beaches are the final 14.5 miles (23.3 km) of beach south of Melbourne Beach to Sebastian.

The United States Board on Geographic Names considered two proposals in 2012 to officially name the barrier island extending from Port Canaveral to Sebastian Inlet. The 45-mile-long (72 km) island includes the cities of Cape Canaveral, Cocoa Beach, Indialantic, Melbourne Beach, Patrick Space Force Base, Indian Harbour Beach, and Satellite Beach. The American Indian Association of Florida submitted in October 2011 a proposal to name the island after the Ais people. In January 2012 the United Third Bridge and the Florida Puerto Rican/Hispanic Chamber of Commerce in Melbourne submitted a proposal to name the island Ponce de León Island, after Spanish explorer Juan Ponce de León. In December 2012, the island was ultimately not named.

=== Communities ===
Brevard County has 16 municipalities. The largest by population is Palm Bay and the smallest is Melbourne Village.

==== Cities ====
- Cape Canaveral
- Cocoa
- Cocoa Beach
- Indian Harbour Beach
- Melbourne
- Palm Bay
- Rockledge
- Satellite Beach
- Titusville
- West Melbourne

==== Towns ====
- Grant-Valkaria
- Indialantic
- Malabar
- Melbourne Beach
- Melbourne Village
- Palm Shores

==== Census-designated places ====
- Cocoa West
- June Park
- Merritt Island
- Micco
- Mims
- North Merritt Island
- Patrick SFB
- Port St. John
- Scottsmoor
- Sharpes
- South Patrick Shores
- Tropical Park
- Viera East
- Viera West
- West Canaveral Groves

==== Other unincorporated communities ====
- Angel City
- Aurantia
- Barefoot Bay
- Bellwood
- Canaveral Groves
- Courtenay
- Eau Gallie
- Floridana Beach
- Georgiana
- Indianola
- Melbourne Shores
- Merritt Island
- Pineda
- Shiloh
- South Cocoa Beach
- Suntree
- Tropic
- Viera

=== Metropolitan Statistical Area ===
The United States Office of Management and Budget has designated Brevard County as the Palm Bay–Melbourne–Titusville, FL Metropolitan Statistical Area. The United States Census Bureau ranked the Palm Bay–Melbourne–Titusville, FL Metropolitan Statistical Area as the 90th most populous metropolitan statistical area and the 96th most populous primary statistical area of the United States as of July 1, 2012.

=== Climate ===
The county has a Köppen climate classification of Cfa, with a year-round distribution of rainfall. This means a humid subtropical climate with hot, humid summers and mild winters. There are distinct wet and dry seasons. The dry lasts from December through May, the wet from June through November. During the dry season, periods of drought often occur, and can lead to a persistent and high wild land fire threat. In numerous instances these fires have caused property damage. Several fires in 2008 forced the evacuation of Bayside High School, in the town of Palm Bay. In that particular event, 162 homes were damaged.

January is the coldest month, with an average low of 50.7 °F (10.4 °C) and an average high 71 °F (22 °C). The warmest months are July and August with average highs of 90 °F (32 °C) and average lows of 72.2 °F (22.3 °C). The driest month is April with 1.6 inches (4.1 cm) of rainfall; the wettest is September, with 6.6 inches (17 cm). Offshore ocean temperatures have averaged: January – 64 °F (18 °C), February – 62 °F (17 °C), March – 67 °F (19 °C) and April – 72 °F (22 °C). In federal maps printed before 2012, nearly half of Brevard was classified as prone to flooding. Most of this was in the relatively undeveloped low-lying areas, west of Interstate 95, on the banks of the St. Johns River. About 18,900 homes out of 164,000 single-family homes were in that area.

==== Environment ====
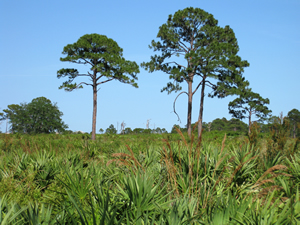
Pine flatwoods and sand pine scrub

Brevard County works together with the federal and state government to control pollution and preserve wetlands and coastal areas through lands dedicated to conservation and wildlife protection. There are 250 square miles (650 km^{2}) of federally protected wildlife refuges. These lands include Merritt Island National Wildlife Refuge, the Canaveral National Seashore, the St. Johns National Wildlife Refuge, the Archie Carr National Wildlife Refuge, several conservation areas managed by the St. Johns River Water Management District, Brevard County's Environmentally Endangered Lands Program Sanctuaries, and lands dedicated by the State as conservation areas. The underlying limestone in the county is relatively young at 150,000 years old. This means that the ground will not develop the sinkholes that are prevalent in the spine of Florida, where limestone is from 15 to 25 million years old.

=== Adjacent counties ===
- Volusia County – north
- Indian River County – south
- Osceola County – southwest
- Orange County – west

=== Fauna ===
There are 4,000 species of animals locally. Common mammals include North American river otters, bobcats, white-tailed deer, raccoons, marsh rabbits, scrub lizards, rat snakes, and opossum. Feral pigs, introduced by Europeans, present an occasional traffic hazard. There are an estimated 3,500 endangered gopher tortoises in the county.

There were 1,677 manatees in Brevard County in 2015, out of a total of 6,063 in the state. This was an increase from 2014 when there was a total of 612 in Brevard County. Manatees experience numerous threats within Brevard, where 312 died in the first half of 2021. Bottlenose dolphin are commonly seen in the Intracoastal Waterway. Fish and reptiles include alligators, red snapper, sea turtles, North Atlantic right whales, a rare protected species, give birth near the coast of Brevard, among other places, from November 15 to April 15.

The venomous brown recluse spider is not native to the area but has found the environment congenial. The Florida Butterfly Monitoring Network has counted species of butterflies monthly for a year since 2007. In 2010, it counted 45 species. Included are zebra swallowtail butterflies. Lovebug season occurs twice annually in May and August–September. Motorists encounter swarms of these while driving during a four-week period. Deer flies are particularly noticeable from April through June.

==== Avian ====
Local bird counts indicate that there are at least 163 species of birds in the county. Turkey vultures, a migrating species, are protected by federal law. They migrate north in the summer and return in September. The county's most common winter bird is the lesser scaup, a diving duck. In 2008, half a million were counted. In 2010, 15,000 were estimated. Other birds include the red-shouldered hawk, the loggerhead shrike, the endangered red-cockaded woodpecker, Cooper's hawks, pileated woodpeckers, Savannah sparrows, rails (which also includes coots), Florida scrub jays (an endangered species), wood storks, grackles, great horned owls, northern mockingbirds, brown thrashers, catbirds, green-winged teals, greater yellowlegs, western sandpipers, least sandpipers, dowitchers, and American white pelicans. Peak migration in the fall is from the last week in September through the first week in October. Fall migration tends to be stronger than spring because birds typically take different flyways.

=== Flora ===
Native trees include cabbage palm (the state tree of Florida), fringetree, coral bean, sweet acacia, geiger tree, firebush, beautyberry, coral honeysuckle, and blanket flower. Other native plants include sea grape, red mulberry, purslane, dandelion, Spanish bayonet, blackberry, Jerusalem artichoke, dogwood, and gallberry. On the east coast of the state, mangroves have normally dominated the coast from Cocoa Beach southward. Northward these may compete with salt marshes moving in from the north, depending on the annual weather conditions. Live oak trees, various grasses, and juniper plants were sufficiently common to generate pollen noticeable by some people in February 2011.

== Demographics ==
Historical population
Census	Pop.	Note	%±
1860	246		—
1870	1,216		394.3%
1880	1,478		21.5%
1890	3,401		130.1%
1900	5,158		51.7%
1910	4,717		−8.5%
1920	8,505		80.3%
1930	13,283		56.2%
1940	16,142		21.5%
1950	23,653		46.5%
1960	111,435		371.1%
1970	230,006		106.4%
1980	272,959		18.7%
1990	398,978		46.2%
2000	476,320		19.4%
2010	543,376		14.1%
2020	606,612		11.6%
2025 (est.)	663,982	▲	9.5%
U.S. Decennial Census; 1790–1960 1900–1990; 1990–2000 2010–2015 2020–2022

=== 2020 census ===
As of the 2020 census, the county had a population of 606,612. The median age was 48.5 years. 18.1% of residents were under the age of 18 and 24.6% of residents were 65 years of age or older. For every 100 females there were 95.4 males, and for every 100 females age 18 and over there were 93.3 males age 18 and over.

The racial makeup of the county was 73.9% White, 9.7% Black or African American, 0.4% American Indian and Alaska Native, 2.6% Asian, 0.1% Native Hawaiian and Pacific Islander, 3.3% from some other race, and 10.0% from two or more races. Hispanic or Latino residents of any race comprised 11.2% of the population.

96.1% of residents lived in urban areas, while 3.9% lived in rural areas.

There were 257,026 households in the county, of which 23.4% had children under the age of 18 living in them. Of all households, 46.9% were married-couple households, 18.9% were households with a male householder and no spouse or partner present, and 27.2% were households with a female householder and no spouse or partner present. About 29.0% of all households were made up of individuals and 14.5% had someone living alone who was 65 years of age or older.

There were 288,794 housing units, of which 11.0% were vacant. Among occupied housing units, 72.9% were owner-occupied and 27.1% were renter-occupied. The homeowner vacancy rate was 1.9% and the rental vacancy rate was 8.9%.

=== Racial and ethnic composition ===
Brevard County, Florida – Racial and ethnic composition Note: the US Census treats Hispanic/Latino as an ethnic category. This table excludes Latinos from the racial categories and assigns them to a separate category. Hispanics/Latinos may be of any race.
Race / Ethnicity (NH = Non-Hispanic)	Pop 1980	Pop 1990	Pop 2000	Pop 2010	Pop 2020	% 1980	% 1990	% 2000	% 2010	% 2020
White alone (NH)	241,049	349,276	398,695	421,466	430,936	88.31%	87.54%	83.72%	77.56%	71.04%
Black or African American alone (NH)	23,518	30,824	39,067	52,677	56,498	8.62%	7.73%	8.20%	9.69%	9.31%
Native American or Alaska Native alone (NH)	588	1,273	1,557	1,709	1,569	0.22%	0.32%	0.33%	0.31%	0.26%
Asian alone (NH)	1,739	5,194	7,061	11,098	15,587	0.64%	1.30%	1.48%	2.04%	2.57%
Native Hawaiian or Pacific Islander alone (NH)	x	x	247	385	482	x	x	0.05%	0.07%	0.08%
Other race alone (NH)	729	150	754	1,075	3,389	0.27%	0.04%	0.16%	0.20%	0.56%
Mixed race or Multiracial (NH)	x	x	6,879	11,023	30,244	x	x	1.44%	2.03%	4.99%
Hispanic or Latino (any race)	5,336	12,261	21,970	43,943	67,907	1.95%	3.07%	4.61%	8.09%	11.19%
Total	272,959	398,978	476,230	543,376	606,612	100.00%	100.00%	100.00%	100.00%	100.00%

A map of the racial demographics in Brevard County by Census tract. Legend: Non-Hispanic White 30–40% 40–50% 50–60% 60–70% 70–80% 80–90% >90% Black or African American 30–40% 50–60% 60–70% Hispanic 30–40% 50–60% No Population Equal

=== 2010 census ===
The population was distributed by age with 19.8% under the age of 18, 7.9% from 18 to 24, 21.5% from 25 to 44, 30.4% from 45 to 64, and 20.4% who were 65 years of age or older. The median age was 45.5 years. For every 100 females there were 96.1 males. For every 100 females age 18 and over, there were 93.9 males.

In 2010, there were 229,692 households, out of which 23.20% had children under the age of 18 living with them, 48.28% were married couples living together, 11.80% had a female householder with no husband present, and 35.40% were non-families. 28.44% of all households were made up of individuals, and 12.53% (4.00% male and 8.53% female) had someone living alone who was 65 years of age or older. The average household size was 2.33 and the average family size was 2.84. There were 74,000 veterans who lived in Brevard in 2010, accounting for 21% of the adults in the county. Of those, a local agency counted in 2010 that 225 of the veterans were homeless.

In 2010, the median income for a household in the county was $49,523, and the median income for a family was $60,842. Males had a median income of $48,191 versus $33,276 for females. The per capita income for the county was $27,606. About 7.2% of families and 10.5% of the population were below the poverty line, including 14.4% of those under age 18 and 6.9% of those aged 65 or over.

In 2010, 8.6% of the county's population was foreign born, with 59.4% being naturalized American citizens. Of foreign-born residents, 49.1% were born in Latin America, 22.9% were born in Europe, 18.3% born in Asia, 6.4% in North America, 2.4% born in Africa, and 0.9% were born in Oceania.

In 2010, 90% of residents had a high school degree, compared with 85% statewide. In 2009, 25.7% of residents had an undergraduate degree, below the national average of 27.7%, but the same as the rest of Florida. 14.7% of residents over 25 had undergraduate degrees in engineering. This is almost twice the national average.

==== Languages ====
In 2010, 90.20% of residents spoke only English at home, while 5.29% spoke Spanish, 0.62% German, 0.61% French, and 0.47% French Creole (mostly Haitian Creole) at home. In total, 9.80% of the population spoke languages other than English in their household.

=== Other demographics ===
In 2015, interracial marriage constituted 29% of all marriages, the fourth highest in the nation, which averaged 17%.

In 2012, the Urban Institute ranked the Brevard metro fourth in the country for racial equality. Criteria were integration of neighborhoods, income, and the quality of schools minorities attend. The area was ranked first for Hispanic equality with whites.

== Government ==
Brevard county is run by a commission–manager government. The county commission comprises five members elected from single-member districts in four-year staggered terms. Commissioners are elected by the public to establish ordinances and policies for the county. The county employed about 2,900 workers in 2009.

There are 16 autonomous municipal governments within the county. The various cities, towns and villages of Brevard have varying reliance on county-provided services. About 100,000 households are located outside organized municipalities, and their occupants are directly served by the county government.

A centrally located County Government Center in Viera was established to provide more accessible services to residents in the southern part of the county. It houses the various county government branches, including Housing and Human Services, Juvenile Justice, Public Safety, Public Works and Solid Waste Management.

The Brevard County government had annual expenditures just over $1 billion in the fiscal year 2009–2010, exclusive of the municipalities. In 2009, real estate taxes for homesteaded property averaged 0.83% of the value of the property. Real estate taxes are levied by each authority. They are collected by the County Tax Collector. The total taxable real estate base was $33.7 billion in 2009. County taxes rose 26.5% in total per capita revenue from 2002 to 2007, and 49.8% in property tax per capita in the same time frame. Delinquent taxes were $36 million in 2008.

Brevard County has two unique election districts. One governs Port Canaveral; the other, the maintenance of the Sebastian Inlet.

=== Government districts ===
Prior to the creation of districts in 1967, state representatives were elected by county. This geographic representation resulted in a longstanding domination of the state legislature by rural interests, as it did not recognize changing patterns of settlement and business in the state. Since redistricting following the 2010 U.S. census, Brevard County has been part of Florida's 8th congressional district.

The county lies within two state senatorial districts:

- the 8th (covering the northern part of the county)
- the 19th (covering the southern part of the county)

The county lies within five state representative districts:

- the 30th (covering the northernmost part of the county)
- the 31st (covering the north-central part of the county)
- the 32nd (covering the central part of the county)
- the 33rd (covering most of the southern part of the county)
- the 34th (covering the southeastern part of the county)

See List of members of the Florida House of Representatives from Brevard County, Florida

=== Justice system ===
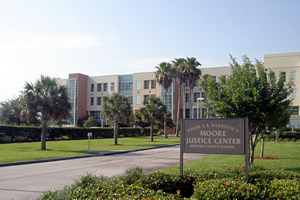
Harry T. and Harriette V. Moore Justice Center in Viera

The county has centralized most county and circuit courts in Viera which try a variety of cases including felonies, misdemeanors, traffic, and domestic. The courthouse in Titusville provides the venue for circuit and county cases arising in the north part of the county while the courthouse in Melbourne is the venue for county cases arising in the southern portion of the county. An elected State Attorney prosecutes criminal cases for the State of Florida. Indigent defendants can be represented by the office of the elected Public Defender. The 18th Circuit Court includes Seminole County as well as Brevard and includes not only the court itself but the State Attorney and the Public Defender. In 2008, the public defender had a staff of 45 lawyers in Brevard who handled about 24,000 cases annually.

The States Attorney's Office sponsors the Victim/Witness Services. This provides advocates to alleged victims of violent crime and their families. The advocate helps the family understand the legal system as they navigate through it. They also seek out financial assistance or counseling they might need.

=== Public services ===
==== Public safety ====
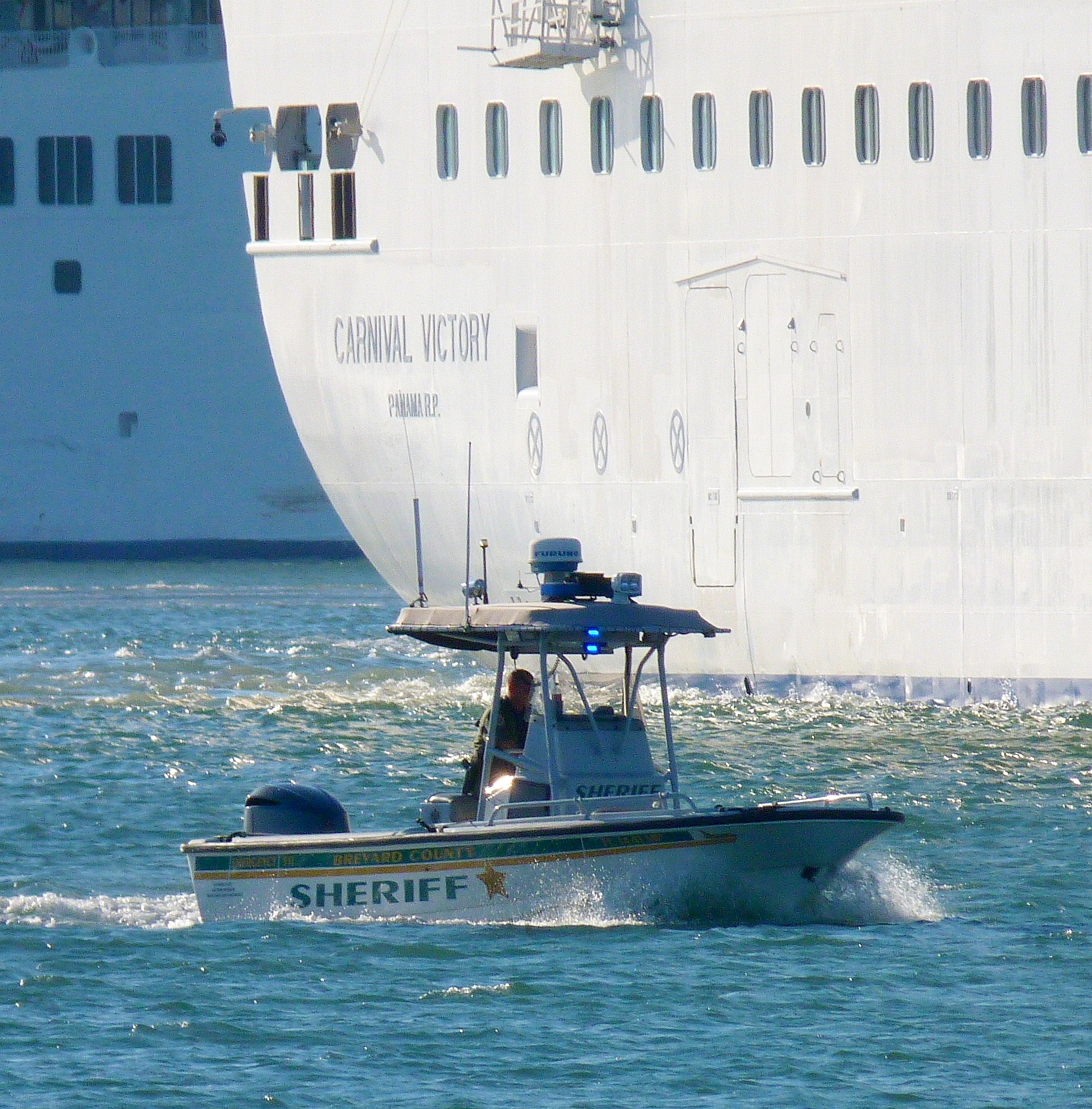
Brevard County Sheriff's boat next to Carnival Victory at Port Canaveral

The County elects a sheriff, directly responsible to the courts but also to the state for the enforcement of state laws. Police chiefs, appointed by their cities or towns, perform the same function locally.

Most municipalities are located on at least one waterway. This has resulted in the county and seven cities having a boat or access to one to aid boaters, or to enforce the law in the water in their jurisdiction.

Since the founding of the Brevard County Sheriff's Office, 7 officers have been killed in the line of duty.

The county jail is a 1976 facility which rapidly became overcrowded. Voters rejected expanding the jail on four occasions. The sheriff solved the problem by the construction of a large but less expensive "hardened tent" to house non-violent offenders. Crowding reached its peak in 2007 at 1,988 inmates, 300 over capacity. The budget for the facility was $42 million in 2010. There were 1,585 residents. Costs for feeding and housing was $72 per inmate daily. There were 475 staff members.

The county jail retains inmates awaiting trial or those who have been sentenced to a year or less. Longer sentences must be served in state prisons, such as the facility in Sharpes for young men.

A unit of the Coast Guard, homeported at Port Canaveral, plays a role in preventing illegal immigration and is an interdictor of drugs in the area.

Public safety for unincorporated areas of the county is the responsibility of the Brevard County Sheriff's Office. All but three of the 17 incorporated municipalities, Malabar, Cape Canaveral and Palm Shores, maintain their own law enforcement services. Those three contract that service to the Sheriff's Office.

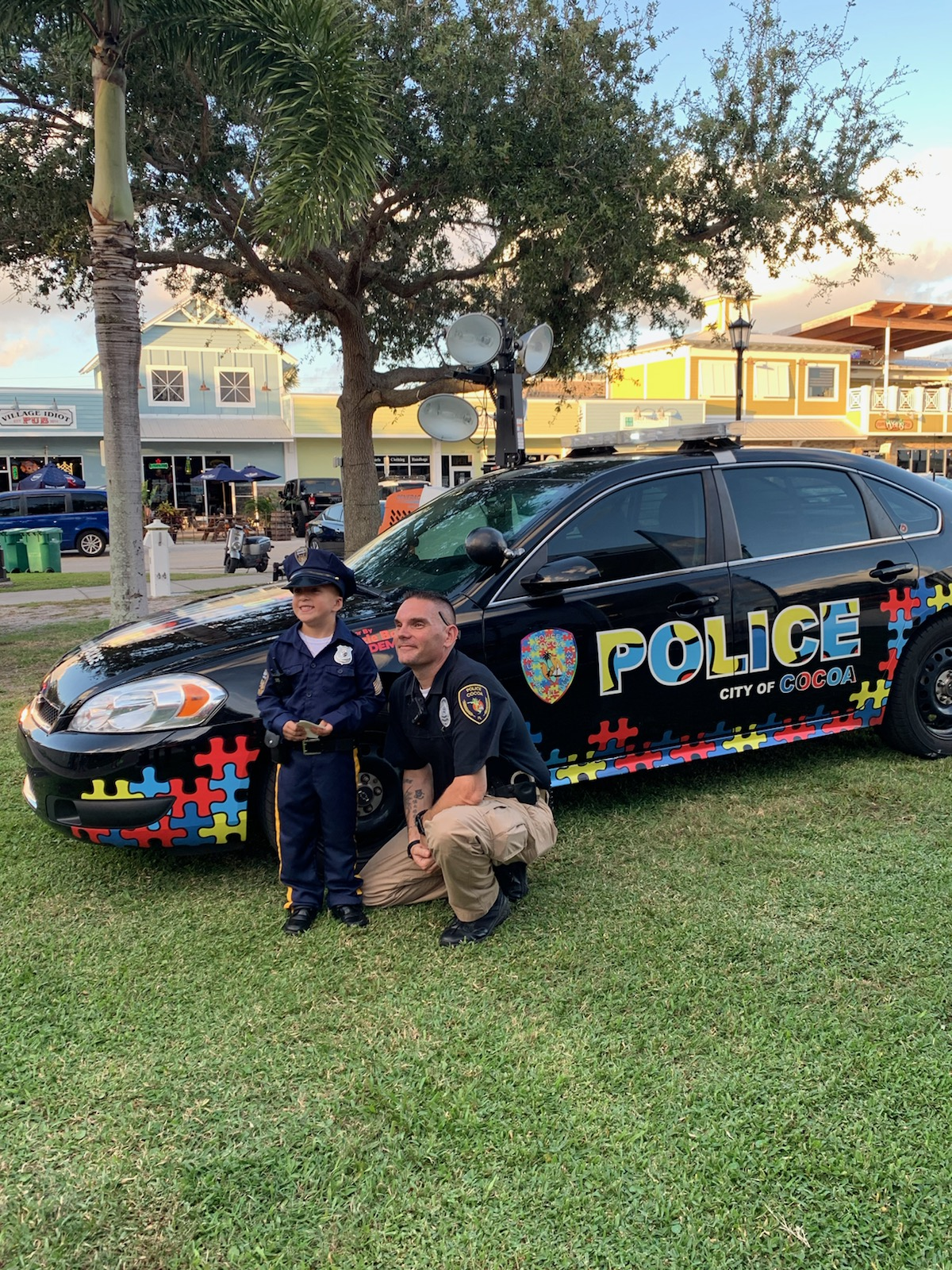
An officer from the Cocoa Police Department poses with a child next to a patrol car emblazoned with "Autism Awareness" livery, during a community event in Cocoa Village

In 2009, there were 1,200 law enforcement officers working in the county, of which 361 are sheriff's deputies. The number of Sheriff's deputies had risen to 843 in 2015. Of all crime that came to the attention of the sheriff's office in 2007, 80% was drug-related. From January to June 2009, the county reported a total of 10,037 crimes. Of these, a majority, 3,002, were under the jurisdiction of the sheriff's department. In 2009, the crime rate was 3,471.3 property-related crimes per 100,000 residents, slightly above the national average.

Public safety for Port Canaveral is under the direction of the Port Authority. Traditionally, emphasis was placed on monitoring the content of containerized cargo on incoming ships, as well as underwater inspection of arriving ships that could be carrying explosive devices. In 2008, the Canaveral Port Authority Board of Commissioners approved the creation of an independent police department.

In 2017, the Florida Highway Patrol had about 32 troopers working different shifts on the I-95 interstate, and the unincorporated parts of the county. Normally there were five or six officers per shift.

The county runs a fire-rescue service. In the year 2015–2016, they responded to 11,383 trauma calls.

In 2017, the fatality rate for pedestrians was the second worst for metropolitan areas in the nation. In 2017, the most dangerous road for bicycles and pedestrians was on State Road A1A from Cocoa Beach to Cape Canaveral.

==== Utilities ====
Three cities provide potable water and sewage for their cities and surrounding areas: Cocoa, Melbourne, and Titusville. The majority of Melbourne water customers are supplied with treated surface water from Lake Washington. Where available, residents were obligated to hook into the system. In 2012, there were 90,000 septic tanks.

Storm and wastewater management fees vary. In 2014, the county charged $36 annually per household. Cities and towns charged from $36 to $77.52 per household annually.

==== Public recreation ====
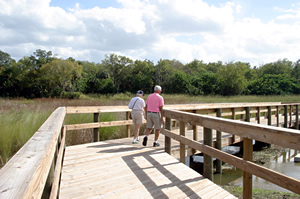
Boardwalk over wetlands area at Chain of Lakes in Titusville

There are more than 100 parks and three campgrounds in the county that are managed by local government agencies. Many of these are managed by the Brevard County Parks and Recreation, an agency within the Brevard County Government. There are 25 public golf courses and three private ones. Due to dwindling numbers of golfers, five courses closed from 2004 to 2017. In 2017, three public courses were being considered for closure.

In 11 sanctuaries that protect natural ecosystems, the county's Environmentally Endangered Lands (EEL) Program offers passive recreation opportunities such as hiking, wildlife viewing, biking and paddling. In 2013, there was a total of 24,000 acres (9,700 ha), with 62 miles (100 km) of trails and 120 miles (190 km) of fire lanes. The quantity of fire lanes was considered insufficient.

The Merritt Island National Wildlife Refuge and the Canaveral National Seashore are two national wildlife refuges in the county that offer recreational pursuits such as hiking, wildlife viewing, paddling, and environmental education.

==== Social services ====
Brevard County provides a number of services to help older people, juveniles, people with physical or mental disabilities, and minorities. The Brevard County Housing Authority acquires and leases housing projects, investigates housing conditions, determines where slums and unsafe housing exist and investigates conditions dangerous to the public. It is managed by a board appointed by the county commission. Several organization provide social services for juveniles, such as the Children's Home Society, Children's Advocacy Center of Brevard, and The Child Care Association of Brevard County. ARC-Brevard, Inc. provides a spectrum of services for the lifespan of 1200 individuals (and their families) with developmental disabilities in nine locations throughout Brevard.

The Brevard County Housing Authority acquires and leases housing projects; investigates housing conditions; determines where slums and unsafe housing exist and investigates conditions dangerous to the public. It is managed by a board appointed by the county commission.

The Children's Home Society (CHS) provides Florida families with a unique spectrum of social services, including foster care, adoption, child abuse prevention, emergency shelters, group homes, case management, and treatment for developmentally disabled children. It is a 501(c)(3) organization.

Among other local services, CHS also runs the Hacienda Girls Ranch which provides a safe haven for forty-five abused, neglected and/or abandoned girls from the ages of 10–18.

Children's Advocacy Center of Brevard is a program of the Space Coast Health Foundation that serves abused and neglected children. Professionals serve children with allegations of abuse, all sexual abuse and the most severe physical abuse and neglect, and their non-offending family members. Onsite crisis and short-term counseling is provided free of charge and without a waiting list. Onsite medical exams, forensic interviews and other assessment services provided by partner, the Child Protection Team.

The Child Care Association of Brevard County, is a private non-profit agency that coordinates child care, early childhood education and early intervention programs and services for families in Brevard County. In April, the Association sponsors a Children's Festival.

The Women's Center provides counseling services, educational programs, criminal justice support/advocacy; crisis counseling; information and referral; personal advocacy; support groups; therapy; translation services; victims compensation claims. There is a Junior League of South Brevard. Serene Harbor provides a domestic violence hotline which is staffed 24/7 by trained advocates. The Salvation Army provides a Domestic Violence Shelter to abused partners and their families. The Brevard County Commission on the Status of Women advises the County Commission on issues affecting women. Its members are appointed by the County Commission.

In June, the Juneteenth Festival is held, commemorating the freeing of the slaves at the end of the Civil War. This attracts about 500 attendees.

The monthly Brevard Ebony News is a newspaper publishing articles of interest to the Afro-American community. There are several local chapters of NAACP committed to improving the lot of minorities. The Brevard Multi-Cultural Unity Council has annually sponsored a Race Unity Day celebrating diversity since 1989. In 1995, the Harry T. and Harriette V. Moore Multi-Cultural Center was created to improve race relations and human relations in Brevard County and the state of Florida. The center sponsors public forums that focus on the value of racial and cultural diversity. Every February they also sponsor a Moore Heritage Festival of the Arts and Humanities. Their slogan is "Building Unity through Diversity." Local centers for worship include the Islamic Society, and B'ai Hai. In February the 300 member Indian Association of Brevard sponsors Indiafest, a festival featuring food, culture and dancing from India, as well as Basakhi, a harvest festival. It attracts 6,500 people. They also sponsor an "India Day" around August 15, celebrating India's Independence. In 2006, 4000 people attended. Local Thai-Americans stage a Songkran Thai New Year Festival in April featuring food and culture of Thailand. 2,000 individuals of American Indian extraction live in the area—including Cherokees, the original inhabitants of the area when the Europeans arrived. This number represents a slightly higher percentage than Florida as a whole. Each December, The Native Heritage Foundation sponsors a "Gathering and Pow-Wow" to publicize and preserve the Native American culture. This attracts upwards of 1,500 attendees. In September, the Annual Family Salsa Festival draws about 1000 people where Puerto Rican heritage is celebrated.

== Elections ==
According to the Secretary of State's office, Republicans form a plurality of registered voters in Brevard County.

Brevard County voter registration & party enrollment as of January 31, 2024
Political party	Total voters	Percentage
Republican	189,821	44.85%
Democratic	113,961	26.93%
Independent	106,735	25.22%
Third Parties	12,711	3.00%
Total	423,228	100%

The county has voted in favor of Republican candidates in all presidential elections since 1980.

United States presidential election results for Brevard County, Florida
Year	Republican		Democratic		Third party(ies)	
Year	No.	%	No.	%	No.	%
1892	0	0.00%	449	88.74%	57	11.26%
1896	337	37.36%	505	55.99%	60	6.65%
1900	121	17.34%	513	73.50%	64	9.17%
1904	125	17.58%	553	77.78%	33	4.64%
1908	225	38.86%	294	50.78%	60	10.36%
1912	61	10.34%	357	60.51%	172	29.15%
1916	174	18.95%	599	65.25%	145	15.80%
1920	659	39.30%	894	53.31%	124	7.39%
1924	515	34.22%	872	57.94%	118	7.84%
1928	1,830	62.12%	1,063	36.08%	53	1.80%
1932	956	34.05%	1,852	65.95%	0	0.00%
1936	1,147	33.28%	2,300	66.72%	0	0.00%
1940	1,984	39.85%	2,995	60.15%	0	0.00%
1944	1,769	40.02%	2,651	59.98%	0	0.00%
1948	2,315	41.61%	2,348	42.20%	901	16.19%
1952	6,756	61.91%	4,157	38.09%	0	0.00%
1956	10,004	71.81%	3,928	28.19%	0	0.00%
1960	17,585	61.37%	11,069	38.63%	0	0.00%
1964	24,551	49.71%	24,833	50.29%	0	0.00%
1968	37,124	48.02%	18,281	23.65%	21,909	28.34%
1972	62,773	78.73%	16,854	21.14%	106	0.13%
1976	44,470	48.15%	46,421	50.26%	1,473	1.59%
1980	69,460	60.07%	39,007	33.73%	7,169	6.20%
1984	102,477	73.45%	36,985	26.51%	49	0.04%
1988	104,854	70.30%	43,004	28.83%	1,301	0.87%
1992	84,585	43.19%	61,091	31.19%	50,184	25.62%
1996	88,022	45.11%	80,445	41.23%	26,666	13.67%
2000	115,253	52.75%	97,341	44.55%	5,894	2.70%
2004	153,068	57.66%	110,309	41.55%	2,085	0.79%
2008	157,589	54.54%	127,620	44.17%	3,718	1.29%
2012	159,300	55.62%	122,993	42.94%	4,135	1.44%
2016	181,848	57.16%	119,679	37.62%	16,614	5.22%
2020	207,883	57.48%	148,549	41.08%	5,221	1.44%
2024	216,533	59.65%	141,233	38.91%	5,249	1.45%

United States Senate election results for Brevard County, Florida1
Year	Republican		Democratic		Third party(ies)	
Year	No.	%	No.	%	No.	%
2024	209,204	58.50%	140,412	39.26%	8,022	2.24%

United States Senate election results for Brevard County, Florida3
Year	Republican		Democratic		Third party(ies)	
Year	No.	%	No.	%	No.	%
2022	165,233	61.85%	98,978	37.05%	2,952	1.10%

Florida Gubernatorial election results for Brevard County
Year	Republican		Democratic		Third party(ies)	
Year	No.	%	No.	%	No.	%
2022	170,562	63.77%	95,131	35.57%	1,760	0.66%

== Economy ==
The county Domestic Product was $30.1 billion in 2022. In 2010 and 2011, the Brookings Institution reported that Brevard ranked in the bottom fifth of the nation's top metro areas, based on unemployment, gross metropolitan product, housing prices and foreclosed properties. Foreclosures reached a monthly high of 963 in March 2009. The county reached an annual high foreclosure in 2009 of 9,772. In December 2010, Forbes magazine rated the area the worst place in America to find a job.

Government purchasing contributed 12–15% of the county's gross domestic product from 2000 to 2010.

Though the area has a relatively small number of high technology companies, 736, a business journal ranked it eighth in the country as a high tech center in 2009. The area had 23,096 high-tech jobs with a ratio of 124 per 1,000 total jobs.

In December 2010, Forbes magazine ranked the area as the worst in the country for finding a job, for the second time in 2010.

During 2020, overlapping the COVID-19 pandemic, the metropolitan area was the second best-performing out of 200 in the country.

=== Personal income ===
As of the census of 2000:

- Median income for a family – $47,571
- Median income for males – $36,542
- Median income for females – $24,632
- Per capita income – $21,484. The county has the 17th highest per capita income in the state (out of 67).
- Median income for a household – $40,099
- In 2005, the median income for a household had risen to $43,281

The county ranked 17th for per capita income, out of Florida's 67 counties.

The following were below the poverty line in 2000:

- Families – 6.80%
- Total population – 9.50%
- Under age 18 – 13.00%
- Age 65 or older – 6.50%

In 2012, 79,621 people in the county were receiving food stamps.

In 2010, there were 5,600 civilian government workers in the county. They earned an average of $74,000 each in 2009.

In 2009, 84,401 households in the county (38%) received social security payments averaging $16,136 for a total of $1.7 billion annually. 53,717 (24%) received pension payments averaging $24,327 for a total of $1.3 billion annually.

=== Housing ===
The taxable value of property went from $20 billion in 2002 to $40 billion in 2007. In 2009 the bubble burst and a rapid descent to $24 billion was experienced. in 2017, the value rose to $35 billion. The last figure includes new construction.

In 2011, the county was rated 6th worst in the country for foreclosures. There were 1,039 for the third quarter of 2010. Nearly half the homes in the county were worth less than their mortgages. The average home had dropped 53.4% since the peak of the boom. In 2012, the county was the highest in foreclosure rate in the nation. In 2013, the metro area was rated "best" in the country for buying, with a 34 months supply of houses, with a discount rate of 28%, according to RealtyTrac. It has since reduced its backlog.

After various insurance companies pulled out of Florida after their losses from the 2004 hurricane season, property insurance became a major concern for many homeowners. As of 2011, 32,000 Brevard policyholders insure with the state-owned Citizens Property Insurance Corporation.

In 2010 Kiplinger.com rated the county one of five "best" places in America to retire. Factors evaluated included cost of living, weather, the number of doctors, taxes, crime rates and recreational opportunities.

The largest home in Brevard is a 50-room 19,000 square feet (1,800 m^{2}) mansion in Suntree built in 1991 and once owned by Cecil Fielder.

==== Development ====
The Viera Company, developing East and West Viera as they’re identified by the US Census Bureau, gained state permission and county acquiescence to create a self-governing board named the Viera Stewardship District that could raise taxes and sell bonds to pay for roads, water lines, pumping stations and other infrastructure needed to support the construction of 16,500 houses, apartments and condominiums.

=== Industry ===
The Brevard economy has been driven by Trade, Transportation and Utilities (18%), Professional and Business Services (17%), Total government (15%), Education and Health (14%), Manufacturing (12%), Leisure and hospitality (10%), Construction (6%), Financial (4%).

In 2012 local government employed 21,000 workers. Over the years the percentage has varied from 7.2% to 7.9% of the population.

The number of people working in construction dropped from 2,630 in 2005 to 1,420 in 2010.

Port Canaveral is one of the world's busiest cruise port. There are seven cruise lines, with six major cruise terminals. There is 750,000 square feet (70,000 m^{2}) of covered freight storage capacity. It handled 4,000,000 short tons (3,600,000 t) of cargo in 2004. The port has contributed $500 million annually to the county's economy.

Two hospitals were among the top five private employers in the county, together employing 8,850 in 2009.

In 2008, 14,865 workers were employed at the NASA/Kennedy Space Center. The Center directly spent $1.82 billion in the county.

Annually, $78 million is spent at the Space Center Visitor's Complex, and $5.9 million from space business visitors.

In 2014, there were 495 aerospace companies in the county. There were 36,223 workers. Sales and revenue from this industry were $3.4 billion.

L3Harris Technologies, headquartered in the county, has the most employees in the private sector, 7,000 in 2019.

There are 15 Community Redevelopment agencies in the county. They are funded from real estate taxes in the affected area. Cocoa has three, and Eau Gallie, one.

Though the area has a relatively small number of high technology companies, 736, a business journal ranked it eighth in the country as a high tech center in 2009. The area had 23,096 high-tech jobs with a ratio of 124 per 1,000 total jobs.

The county had 1,050 restaurants in 2007 and nearly that many (1,040) in 2010. There were 22,600 leisure and hospitality workers in the county in 2006. This figure includes hotel workers. That figure had dropped 8.5% to 20,700 in 2010.

In the early 2010s, the Shiloh area was proposed by Space Florida as a potential location for the development of a commercial-only spaceport. Located immediately north of the U.S. Government's Kennedy Space Center, the open access to the flyover range on the open Atlantic Ocean to the east, and easy access to the tracking facilities of the Eastern Test Range make the location an attractive launch site. Among other potential users of the commercial spaceport facility, SpaceX was reported to be considering Shiloh as one of several potential locations for building a commercial launch facility.

Space Coast Credit Union is the largest locally based financial institution in Brevard County and the third largest credit union in the state of Florida.

==== Military ====
Military installations in Brevard County include Patrick Space Force Base, near Satellite Beach, Cape Canaveral Space Force Station (CCSFS), adjacent to the Kennedy Space Center, and the U.S. Air Force Malabar Test Facility on Minton Road in suburban Palm Bay. In 2009, they employed a total of 2,000 civilian federal workers. In 2012 there were 2,900 military jobs in the county.

The United States Coast Guard (USCG) Maintains one station in Port Canaveral, the station is located on the east bank of the West Turning Basin. The station is home to USCG cutter 617.

The Navy maintains a Trident turning basin at Port Canaveral for ballistic missile submarines. The Naval Ordnance Test Unit (NOTU) tests weapons on these subs, which arrive at the rate of one a month. 160 ships visited their two piers in 2017. The 2005 base closures included realigning NOTU out of state. The community was successful in having this decision revoked. The unit employs 100 military personnel and 900 civilian contractors.

Cape Canaveral Space Force Station houses the Air Force Space & Missile Museum and Launch Complex 26, where many uncrewed rockets were launched early in the U.S. space program, including Explorer 1, the first US spacecraft placed in earth orbit.

The USS Brevard (AK-164) was a World War II Alamosa-class naval cargo ship that was decommissioned shortly after the war.

==== Agriculture ====
23% of Brevard County is agricultural-usable for citrus, raising cattle or horses. Cattle ranches include the Deseret, Duda Ranch, Kempfer, and two other major ranches. Citrus growers include Victory Groves and Harvey's Indian River Groves. The county ranked 21 out of 24 Florida counties in the shipment of gift fruit.

In 2009, aquaculture was a $900,000 business in the county. The county produces more than 25% of all blue crabs along Florida's East Coast.

There are 40 4-H-related clubs in the county, including livestock- and pet-related and after-school clubs. As in all Cooperative extension service, a land grant college, the University of Florida, conducted over 60 courses in 2010 in aid of 4-H programs and other agricultural pursuits.

In February 2010, the USDA declared that Brevard, along with 59 other Florida counties, was a "primary natural disaster area". This happened when the temperature falls below 28 °F (−2 °C) degrees for 4 hours, where crops are being grown.

==== Tourism ====
In 2016, tourism represents about 9% of the county's gross domestic product. The industry employs about 13% of the workforce. The county raised its room tax to 5% in 2005. In 2012, this raised $8.4 million.

In 2008, tourists spent $2.89 billion in the county. This is distributed in several categories: lodging $839 million, eating and drinking $509 million, Kennedy Space Center $597 million, retail sales $450 million, entertainment $120 million, and Port Canaveral $109 million. Brevard tourists come mainly from ten states: Florida itself is first, followed by Ohio, Illinois, Michigan, New York, Virginia, Wisconsin, Georgia, Minnesota, and Pennsylvania. The five primary sources of foreign visitors are Canada, the United Kingdom, Germany, China, and Italy.

1.6 million people visited the Space Center Visitor Complex in 2008. Tourism, measured by the tourist tax, reached a peak in March 2007.

In 2009, there were 2.4 million overnight visitors in the county. There were 1.2 million day visitors. In 2013, a city manager estimated that 20% of income from tourism comes during spring break.

Brevard competes with other Florida areas for tourists. A number of organizations help promote the area. The Space Coast Office of Tourism consists of county staff and the Brevard County Tourist Development Council (TDC). They attempt to attract tourists. The TDC serves as an advisory council to the county on the expenditures of revenues received from a tourist tax. This revenue is spent on beach improvements, visitor information centers and website, promotion and advertising, the Brevard Zoo, additional beach improvements and the Space Coast Stadium.

$97.7 million has been spent on beach replenishment in the county between 2000 and 2010. This was funded 58% by the federal government, 27% by the state and 15% by the county.

In 2008 monthly tourist tax revenue slumped from a high of $1,174,742 in March to a seasonal low in September of $432,145. In 2008, the county had 11,000 hotel rooms available. In July 2007, there was a 66.1% occupancy rate. In 2008, the county had a nearly identical 81%+ occupancy rate in March and April. This fell to a seasonal low of 42.3% in September. In January 2010, the average hotel room rate was $88.25.

Cocoa Main Street, a member of the Florida and National Main Street Programs, works toward restoring business sites in the historic area known as "Cocoa Village". Cocoa Main Street has received six Florida Main Street Awards given by the Secretary of State. The restored area is a tourist attraction and an economic magnet. Melbourne Main Street is another historic business area and tourist attraction restored through the Main Street Programs.

Brevard has five judged art festivals annually attracting tens of thousands of people to art displays. Most festivals are held in the spring or fall when many tourists can attend. Many other annual festivals are held in parks and public sites throughout the year. The Brevard Cultural Alliance (BCA) maintains an event calendar and a map of sites of historic, cultural, and ecological interest.

The annual Florida Key Lime Pie Festival is held beach side every Martin Luther King Jr. Day weekend. In 2018 The Florida Key Lime Pie Company successfully made the World's largest key lime pie.

An annual February Greek Festival had over 8,000 visitors in 2011.

The annual Grant Seafood Festival attracts as many as 50,000 people for the two-day February event. It is the Southeast's largest and longest running seafood festival.

An ice skating rink in Rockledge serves the county's residents and visitors with hockey and figure skating events.

In 2009, recreational boat owners generated almost $51 million annually towards the county economy, ranking the industry fifth in the state.

=== Labor ===
There were 168,500 private sector jobs in the county in 2009. The Bureau of Labor Statistics counted the following workers in Brevard along with average annual pay ($):

- Retail 25,900 ($23,361)
- Manufacturing 21,700 ($65,521)
- Local government 20,100 ($42,517)
- Hospitality 19,600 ($15,857).

The largest local employer is Brevard Public Schools, with 9,500 employees, 5,000 of which are teachers. Brevard County Teachers are represented by the Brevard Federation of Teachers (AFT).

The county had an unemployment rate of 12.7% in January 2010, a 20-year record high. In March 2010, there were 33,500 people out of work. The county experienced a record low unemployment in 2005 of 2.8%. There were 32,608 people unemployed in the county in January 2011.

In 2009, there were 6,400 federal workers, total, employed in the county. They earned an average of $74,600.

In 2009, average annual salaries in the county for engineers was $90,563; registered nurses $53,315; education $49,441; police officers $43,035; cooks $21,569; and cashiers $19,489. The average annual pay for all workers was then $42,411.

In 2011, there were more engineers (48) per thousand workers than any other region in the United States.

Kennedy Space Center (KSC) is the largest employer in the county with 15,000 contractors and civil servants. While there is concern about the new generation of space vehicles requiring 1/3 fewer workers, about that number were eligible for retirement by 2011. Unions represented at KSC include the American Federation of Government Employees, the International Association of Machinists and the International Brotherhood of Electrical Workers.

== Healthcare ==
As of 2011, there were ten hospitals in the county, with 1,734 beds total. Health First is the largest healthcare provider in the county, consisting of four not-for-profit hospitals—Cape Canaveral Hospital in Cocoa Beach, Holmes Regional Medical Center in Melbourne, Viera Hospital in Viera, Florida and Palm Bay Community Hospital in Palm Bay.

Besides hospitalization, services include outpatient centers; the county's only trauma center (at Holmes Regional Medical Center); home care; specialized programs for cancer, diabetes, heart, stroke, and rehabilitative services; central Brevard's largest medical group; and Medicare Advantage, commercial POS, and commercial HMO health plans. Parrish Medical Center, a 210-bed hospital, was named America's No. 1 Healing Hospital for the third straight year by the Baptist Healing Trust.

== Former place names ==
There are place names currently used, or used at one time by the USGS. Some are early developments, while others are former stations along the main line of the Florida East Coast Railway. Several of these disappeared when Kennedy Space Center took over their area.

== Education ==
Higher education is provided by Eastern Florida State College (EFSC) and Florida Institute of Technology. There are satellite campuses for the University of Central Florida, Barry University, Embry–Riddle Aeronautical University, Keiser University, and Webster University.

Elementary and secondary education is provided by the Brevard Public Schools and private schools.

In 2011, six public schools were ranked by the state in the top ten schools in the state, out of 2,800 There was one list each for primary and secondary schools.

== Libraries ==
The Brevard County Library System has 17 branches. Although the Merritt Island Public Library is counted as part of the Brevard County Public Library System, it is part of a separate library district. In 2005, HB1079 was passed to codify all the special acts under which the Merritt Island Public Library District exists.

== Sports ==
Minor league baseball

Brevard County was the home of the Brevard County Manatees, the Class-A affiliate of the Milwaukee Brewers until 2016.

In 2009, the Space Coast Surge, a member of the Florida Winter Baseball League, had the Cocoa Stadium as their home stadium.

Major league baseball

The Washington Nationals held their spring training at Space Coast Stadium in Viera until 2016. They play about 14 games against other professional teams locally in March as part of the "Grapefruit" League.

Minor league basketball

The Brevard Blue Ducks, members of the United States Basketball League (USBL), played at the Clemente Center at Florida Tech.

Minor league football

The Brevard Rams and Space Coast Predators were scheduled to play as members of the Florida Football Alliance in 2010.

Amateur sports

Aside from school-sponsored sports, there are youth leagues for basketball, football, soccer, lacrosse, gymnastics, baseball and swimming.

== Infrastructure ==
=== Transportation ===
While Brevard County has transportation available in the usual modes for a coastal county—highways, shipping, and airlines—it has the addition of space transportation, making it unique in the world.

Public transportation is provided by Space Coast Area Transit.

The county contains about 300 gasoline retail outlets.

=== Airports ===
- Arthur Dunn Airpark
- Melbourne Orlando International Airport
- Merritt Island Airport
- Space Coast Regional Airport
- Valkaria Airport

=== Power ===
Florida Power & Light (FPL) maintains an oil-fired generating plant at Sharpes; it generates 800 megawatts (1,100,000 hp), supplying most of the requirements for the county. In 2008 the company announced plans to replace the plant with a more efficient natural gas-powered plant in 2013 with a 1,250 megawatt capacity, which can supply 250,000 homes or businesses. Near FPL's plant is the Indian River Power Plant; formerly owned by the Orlando Utilities Commission, it is now owned and operated by RRI Energy. In 2016, FPL had 304,400 customers in Brevard.

Florida City Gas furnishes natural gas to various areas of the county.

=== Communication ===
The area code for most of the county became "321" in 1999, as in the "3...2...1... lift-off!" countdown sequence. A small portion of the county along the southern border, including the communities of Micco and Barefoot Bay, share a 772 area code with Indian River County and St. Lucie County, Florida to the south.

=== Solid waste ===
The county government maintains various landfills for solid waste. Brevard County Central Disposal Facility is located in Cocoa, has a size 190-acre (77 ha) and receives annually around 275,000 tonnes of waste. In 2013, the county planned a new $100 million landfill, north of U.S. Route 192, near the border with Osceola County, 8.5 miles (13.7 km) west of I-95. The county has awarded a $3.9 million contract for a wetlands mitigation for this new landfill.

In 2013, the county, for the first time, let a seven-year contract out for bids for solid waste. The resulting contract is expected to cost $1 billion over the lifetime of the contract, the county's largest single contract. This was the first time in 20 years, a bid was requested. In the past, Waste Management, Inc has performed the work, not only for the county but for 9 of 16 Brevard municipalities. Waste Pro has five of the remaining municipal contracts. Rockledge and Titusville maintain their own trash service. In 2013, the county directly contracts for solid waste pickup for 100,000 residences.

=== Water ===
In 2013, the county consumed about 100,000,000 US gallons (380,000,000 L; 83,000,000 imp gal) daily. Landscape irrigation accounted for about half of this usage.

In 2017, there were five municipal entities selling water (figures in parentheses are millions of gallons/day): Cocoa (22), Melbourne (19), Palm Bay (6), Titusville (2), and West Melbourne (1). The fifth, Brevard County (1), is low because county areas outside the preceding cities, purchase their water from those cities.

=== Wastewater ===
The county controls six Wastewater Treatment Facilities: Mims (900,000 US gallons (3,400,000 L; 750,000 imp gal)/day), Port St. John (500,000 US gallons (1,900,000 L; 420,000 imp gal)/day), South Central (Viera) (12,000,000 US gallons (45,000,000 L; 10,000,000 imp gal)/day), South Beaches, and Barefoot Bay area. Some cities have wastewater treatment plants, as well.

== Media ==
Brevard County is within the Orlando-Daytona Beach-Melbourne-Cocoa-Clermont television market. The county is within range of many television and radio stations located in Orlando.

=== Newspapers ===
Florida Today is the major daily newspaper serving Melbourne, Brevard County and the Space Coast region of Florida. It is owned by the media conglomerate Gannett Company. A monthly newspaper, El Playero, serves the Spanish-speaking population of the Space Coast. The Brevard Business News, Hometown News, Space Coast Daily, Talk of Titusville, and Viera Voice also cover local news within Brevard County.

=== Television ===
Most of Brevard County receives cable television from Charter Spectrum. Comcast serves the Micco and Palm Bay areas in southern Brevard County.

Local stations licensed to or located in Brevard County include:

- Channel 43 WOTF-TV (UniMás)
- Channel 52 WHLV-TV (TBN)
- Channel 68 WEFS (educational independent)

=== Films and television ===
The following films were filmed (in parts) in Brevard County:

- Matinee (1993), filmed in Cocoa Village and Cocoa Playhouse
- Apollo 13 (1995), Contact (1997), Armageddon (1998) and Moonraker (1979) all utilized Cape Canaveral or Kennedy Space Center facilities.
- Marvin's Room (1996), filmed in Rockledge
- Nightmare (1981) horror film shot in Merritt Island, Cocoa, Cocoa Beach and Titusville
- SpaceCamp (1986), filmed in at Kennedy Space Center
- Things Behind the Sun (2001), by independent filmmakers Allison Anders, raised in Cocoa Beach and Cape Canaveral, and Kurt Voss
- Space Cowboys (2000)
- Stowaway to the Moon (1975), filmed in Titusville and several Kennedy Space Center locations.
- Portions of Jaws 3-D (1983) were filmed on the Minutemen Causeway.
- The Number 23 (2007) shot scenes on the shore of Cocoa Beach.
- I'll Believe You (2006)
- The Manure Film Project: A Crappy Documentary with Absolutely No Budget (2018)
- Transformers: Dark of the Moon, directed by Michael Bay. Filmed in 2010 at Kennedy Space Center's Vehicle Assembly Building (VAB), orbiter processing facilities, and launch pad among other areas

Television series included:

- The Cape, 13 episodes (1996 through 1997)
- From the Earth to the Moon, a miniseries (1998)
- I Dream of Jeannie, a 1960s comedy series, was set in Cocoa Beach and Cape Canaveral but filmed in California.

== Arts and culture ==
The Maxwell C. King Center for the Performing Arts, seating 2000, features locally produced and former Broadway shows, ballet, and symphony. Several different performances are scheduled each week.

The Brevard Symphony Orchestra and the Space Coast Ballet offer shows performed by professionals. There is the professional Space Coast Symphony Orchestra. Community orchestras and bands include, but are not limited to, the Melbourne Community Orchestra, the Space Coast Pops and the Community Band of Brevard. Choral groups include the Brevard Community Chorus, the Brevard Chorale, the Indialantic Chamber Singers, and the Brevard Youth Chorus.

The Brevard Zoo is a 75 acres (30 ha) facility that contains more than 650 animals representing more than 165 species from Florida, South America, Africa, Asia and Australia. The Zoo offers animal experiences including giraffe and lorikeet feedings, African kayak tours, paddle boats in the wetlands and a train ride.

Ballet

The Space Coast Ballet incorporates professional principal dancers and instructors together with many roles for local senior talent as well as roles for students. They annually stage The Nutcracker.

Museums and attractions

The Kennedy Space Center Visitor Complex offers an educational look at the accomplishments of America's space program. The Observation Gantry near Launch Complex 39 offers a view of the Space Shuttle launch pads (first built for the Apollo missions), the Vehicle Assembly Building, and the crawlerway over which rockets are taken to the pad. The Apollo/Saturn V Center displays an example of the largest rocket ever launched.

The US Space Walk of Fame in Titusville commemorates both the astronauts and the NASA and contractor personnel who made American crewed space exploration possible with museum and monuments.

The Brevard Museum of History & Natural Science features the remains of the "Windover Man", the oldest human remains found on the North American continent, and a re-creation of the Windover Dig, a "wet" archaeological site. A visitor may see how Native Americans lived and Florida pioneers survived.

Honor America runs the Liberty Bell Memorial Museum. This houses a replica of the Liberty Bell, historical documents, and patriotic memorabilia. Items are permanent reminders of our nation's history, as well as a memorial to military veterans.

The Harry T. and Harriette V. Moore Memorial Park and Cultural Center features a museum with artifacts and timeline of the civil rights movement and the story of Harry T. and Harriette V. Moore, civil rights leaders who were killed after their home was bombed on December 25, 1951.

The Wizard of Oz Museum features a large collection of over 3,000 Wizard of Oz artifacts and memorabilia, including the first known published copy of The Wonderful Wizard of Oz, signed by L. Frank Baum, an early copy of the script for the 1939 MGM movie, and a fox-raccoon jacket owned by Judy Garland, monogrammed with her initials, "JG." The facility also includes a gift shop, and a large room with 31 projectors featuring both the Van Gogh Experience, and a Wizard of Oz immersive experience.

== See also ==
- Brevard, North Carolina
- National Register of Historic Places listings in Brevard County, Florida
