= North Merritt Island, Florida =

- Census-designated place
- Location within Florida Location within the United States
- Coordinates: 28°29′08″N 80°43′50″W
- Country: United States
- State: Florida
- County: Brevard

Area
  - Total: 28.79 sq mi (74.56 km^{2})
  - Land: 16.86 sq mi (43.66 km^{2})
  - Water: 11.93 sq mi (30.90 km^{2})
- Elevation: 3 ft (0.91 m)

Population (2020)
  - Total: 8,566
  - Density: 508.1/sq mi (196.19/km^{2})
- Time zone: UTC-5 (Eastern (EST))
  - Summer (DST): UTC-4 (EDT)
- ZIP Code: 32953 (Merritt Island)
- Area code: 321
- FIPS code: 12-49435
- GNIS feature ID: 2805180

North Merritt Island is a census-designated place (CDP) in Brevard County, Florida, United States. It occupies a portion of the physical Merritt Island, north of the CDP of Merritt Island and south of Merritt Island National Wildlife Refuge. Florida State Road 3 is the main highway through the community, leading north to Florida State Road 405 and south to Florida State Road 528. Situated on an Atlantic coast peninsula, North Merritt Island is a portion of the larger Merritt Island area in Brevard County, Florida. The area is close to the Cape Canaveral Space Force Station and the Kennedy Space Center.

North Merritt Island was first listed as a CDP prior to the 2020 census. The population was 8,566 at the 2020 census. It is part of the Palm Bay—Melbourne—Titusville, Florida Metropolitan Statistical Area.

== Geography ==
The Banana River to the east and the Indian River to the west encircle North Merritt Island. The region's topography is defined by a diversity of wildlife habitats, lush vegetation, and waterfront residences. The Merritt Island National Wildlife Refuge contains hiking trails and locations for fishing, bird watching, and observing a variety of habitats and wildlife.

North Merritt Island experiences warm, dry winters and humid summers due to its subtropical climate. This environment influences the patterns of the local animals, particularly migrating birds, and encourages the creation of lush flora. A variety of subtropical and coastal vegetation types can be found in the area, including mangrove swamps, palm and oak trees, and other marsh and woodland habitats. Because of its abundant biodiversity, the area is commonly visited by nature lovers and bird watchers.

== Demographics ==
Historical population
Census	Pop.	Note	%±
2020	8,566		—
U.S. Decennial Census

North Merritt Island first appeared as a census designated place in the 2020 U.S. census.

=== 2020 census ===
As of the 2020 census, North Merritt Island had a population of 8,566. The median age was 53.5 years. 17.1% of residents were under the age of 18 and 26.1% of residents were 65 years of age or older. For every 100 females there were 100.3 males, and for every 100 females age 18 and over there were 98.2 males age 18 and over.

70.4% of residents lived in urban areas, while 29.6% lived in rural areas.

There were 3,498 households in North Merritt Island, of which 22.6% had children under the age of 18 living in them. Of all households, 60.1% were married-couple households, 15.1% were households with a male householder and no spouse or partner present, and 19.1% were households with a female householder and no spouse or partner present. About 23.0% of all households were made up of individuals and 14.6% had someone living alone who was 65 years of age or older.

There were 3,811 housing units, of which 8.2% were vacant. The homeowner vacancy rate was 1.4% and the rental vacancy rate was 6.4%.

Racial composition as of the 2020 census
Race	Number	Percent
White	7,343	85.7%
Black or African American	93	1.1%
American Indian and Alaska Native	40	0.5%
Asian	248	2.9%
Native Hawaiian and Other Pacific Islander	7	0.1%
Some other race	146	1.7%
Two or more races	689	8.0%
Hispanic or Latino (of any race)	593	6.9%

== Economy ==
Given its close proximity to the Kennedy Space Center and United States Space Force Station, the aerospace industry has a significant impact on the local economy. Other economic pursuits include fishing, boating, and tourism, which draws tourists drawn by the area's scenery and space-related attractions.

Recreational activities, undertaken by both locals and visitors, include boating, fishing, and water sports. These are popular because there are rivers nearby and beaches in the area.

North Merritt Island real estate consists of both upland and waterfront properties. In comparison to Florida's more densely populated coastal locations, the area is known for having larger lots and more spacious homes.
