= Radical Loving Care =

2003 book by Erie Chapman

Radical Loving Care: Building the Healing Hospital in America
- Author: Erie Chapman
- Publisher: Baptist Healing Hospital Trust
- Publication date: 2003
- ISBN: 9780974736600

Radical Loving Care: Building the Healing Hospital in America is a book by Erie Chapman, former chief executive of Riverside Methodist Hospital and U.S. Health Corp. (now OhioHealth) and former host of the Life Choices with Erie Chapman television series. The book describes an approach to health care intended to create patient experiences in hospitals and charities that honor the vulnerability of people in need. A key element of care described in Radical Loving Care is consistency, so that in a culture of loving care all patients would receive loving care from all caregivers all the time.

A healing hospital that has adopted the Radical Loving Care approach is Bingham Memorial Hospital.

The book, ISBN 0-9747366-0-0, was published by The Baptist Healing Trust (of which Erie Chapman was founding President), in 2003.
