= Shiloh, Florida =

Shiloh was a village in Brevard County, Florida, United States. It is the northernmost place in Brevard County. Scottsmoor also shares the title, across the Indian River.

Shiloh is currently uninhabited. It was an active community during the turn of the 19th to the 20th Century. During the beginning of the Space Age, the village was later annexed to NASA's John F. Kennedy Space Center (KSC), Merritt Island, Florida, Merritt Island National Wildlife Refuge, and the Canaveral National Seashore.

Shiloh is a "dark sky" site used by the Kennedy Space Center Amateur Astronomers and the Brevard Astronomical Society for astronomical observation and imaging.

== Proposed spaceport ==
In the early 2010s, the Shiloh area was proposed by Space Florida as a potential location for the development of a commercial spaceport. Located immediately north of the U.S. Government's Kennedy Space Center, the open access to the flyover range on the open Atlantic Ocean to the east, and easy access to the tracking facilities of the Eastern Test Range make the location attractive on many margins. Among other potential users of the spaceport facility, SpaceX was reported to be considering Shiloh as one of several potential locations for building a commercial launch facility. Opponents of the proposed Shiloh launch location cite the potential for a negative impact on the natural environment; particular as this area is home to several species listed as endangered or threatened. Even though the National Air & Space Administration has yet to agree to turn over the land to the state of Florida for commercial development, NASA has agreed to let the Federal Aviation Administration lead an environmental impact study at the proposed site. SpaceX ended up selecting Brownsville, Texas to build its private spaceport.

On May 2, 2013, the Volusia County Council voted 6–1 in favor of a commercial launch site at Shiloh. Though largely symbolic in nature, the vote was considered by many to be a critical step toward any future development of the proposed Shiloh location.

After difficulties gaining support from environmental groups and others, Space Florida began looking in July 2014 for alternatives to the Shiloh location that would facilitate commercial space launch pads on the Florida Space Coast. These include working with the Air Force Space Command to see about converting some of the very large amount of unused military launch pads at Cape Canaveral Space Force Station (south of Shiloh) to state land that might be used as a commercial spaceport.

== Geography ==
Shiloh was the part of Merritt Island between the Old Haulover Canal to the south, and Volusia County to the north. It is still used in the atlas of Brevard County. Shiloh is located at 28°46.0′N 80°46.6′W.

== Surrounding areas ==
- Wilson
- Canaveral National Seashore
- Scottsmoor
- Volusia County
