= West Canaveral Groves, Florida =

- Census-designated place
- Location within Florida Location within the United States
- Coordinates: 28°22′54″N 80°50′43″W
- Country: United States
- State: Florida
- County: Brevard

Area
  - Total: 3.77 sq mi (9.77 km^{2})
  - Land: 3.76 sq mi (9.75 km^{2})
  - Water: 0.0077 sq mi (0.02 km^{2})
- Elevation: 16 ft (4.9 m)

Population (2020)
  - Total: 272
  - Density: 72.3/sq mi (27.91/km^{2})
- Time zone: UTC-5 (Eastern (EST))
  - Summer (DST): UTC-4 (EDT)
- ZIP Code: 32926 (Cocoa)
- Area code: 321
- FIPS code: 12-76058
- GNIS feature ID: 2805197

West Canaveral Groves is a census-designated place (CDP) in Brevard County, Florida, United States. It is in western Brevard County, south of Florida State Route 528, north of Florida State Road 520, and 7 miles (11 km) west of Cocoa.

The community was first listed as a CDP prior to the 2020 census. The population was 272 at the 2020 census. It is part of the Palm Bay—Melbourne—Titusville, Florida Metropolitan Statistical Area.

== Demographics ==
Historical population
Census	Pop.	Note	%±
2020	272		—
U.S. Decennial Census

West Canaveral Groves first appeared as a census designated place in the 2020 U.S. census.

=== Racial and ethnic composition ===
West Canaveral Groves CDP, Florida – Racial and ethnic composition Note: the US Census treats Hispanic/Latino as an ethnic category. This table excludes Latinos from the racial categories and assigns them to a separate category. Hispanics/Latinos may be of any race.
Race / Ethnicity (NH = Non-Hispanic)	Pop 2020	2020
White alone (NH)	241	88.60%
Black or African American alone (NH)	0	0.00%
Native American or Alaska Native alone (NH)	2	0.74%
Asian alone (NH)	4	1.47%
Native Hawaiian or Pacific Islander alone (NH)	0	0.00%
Other race alone (NH)	2	0.74%
Mixed race or Multiracial (NH)	15	5.51%
Hispanic or Latino (any race)	8	2.94%
Total	272	100.00%
