= USS Brevard =

WWII Alamosa-class naval cargo ship

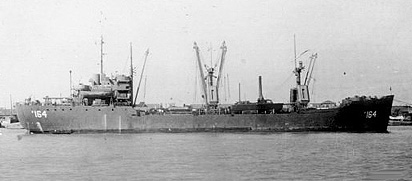
- USS Brevard (AK-164), at anchor in the stream on the Huangpu River at Shanghai, China, 27 October 1945.

History

United States
- Name: Brevard
- Namesake: Brevard County, Florida
- Ordered: as type (C1-M-AV1) hull, MC hull 2109
- Builder: Kaiser Shipbuilding Co., Richmond, California
- Yard number: 66
- Laid down: 2 September 1944
- Launched: 18 November 1944
- Sponsored by: Mrs. C.S. Wieringa
- Commissioned: 19 February 1945
- Decommissioned: 3 July 1946
- Stricken: 8 October 1946
- Identification: Hull symbol: AK-164; Code letters: NEGE
- Fate: Sold, 17 March 1947, Netherlands owner

History

Netherlands
- Name: Zeehond
- Namesake: (Dutch: Seal)
- Acquired: 17 March 1947
- Fate: Sold 1948

History

Netherlands
- Name: Hestia
- Namesake: Hestia
- Owner: Koninklijke Nederlandsche Stoomboot Mattschappij N.V.
- Acquired: 1948
- Fate: Sold 1962

History

Saudi Arabia
- Name: Leila B
- Namesake: Leila (name)
- Owner: Saudi Lines
- Acquired: 1963
- Fate: Sold for scrapping at Tienstsin, China in August 1970

General characteristics
- Class & type: Alamosa-class cargo ship
- Type: C1-M-AV1
- Tonnage: 5,032 long tons deadweight (DWT)
- Displacement: 2,382 long tons (2,420 t) (standard); 7,450 long tons (7,570 t) (full load)
- Length: 388 ft 8 in (118.47 m)
- Beam: 50 ft (15 m)
- Draft: 21 ft 1 in (6.43 m)
- Installed power: 1 × Nordberg, TSM 6 diesel engine; 1,750 shp (1,300 kW)
- Propulsion: 1 × propeller
- Speed: 11.5 kn (21.3 km/h; 13.2 mph)
- Capacity: 3,945 t (3,883 long tons) DWT; 9,830 cu ft (278 m^{3}) (refrigerated); 227,730 cu ft (6,449 m^{3}) (non-refrigerated)
- Complement: 15 Officers; 70 Enlisted
- Armament: 1 × 3 in (76 mm)/50 caliber dual-purpose gun (DP); 6 × 20 mm (0.8 in) Oerlikon anti-aircraft (AA) cannons

USS Brevard (AK-164) was an Alamosa-class cargo ship commissioned by the U.S. Navy for service in World War II. She was responsible for delivering troops, goods and equipment to locations in the war zone.

== Construction ==
Brevard was laid down on 2 September 1944 at Richmond, California, by Kaiser Cargo Inc., under a United States Maritime Commission contract, MC hull 2109; launched on 18 November 1944; sponsored by Mrs. C.S. Wieringa, wife of the out-fitting superintendent at the builders' yard; delivered to the Navy and commissioned on 19 February 1945.

== Service history ==
"In orderly procession," Lt. Wild later wrote, "came 'Fitting-Out Availability' at Treasure Island, California, loading of stores and material at Oakland, California, two weeks of shakedown in San Pedro, Los Angeles, and post-shakedown availability at San Pedro." Following those post-commissioning details, Brevard loaded cargo at San Francisco, California, and put to sea for Hawaii on 8 April.

=== World War II Pacific Theatre operations ===
Brevard carried fleet freight, spare parts and equipment either consigned directly to operating units or to tenders in the forward areas for subsequent installation; she also carried tanks, trucks, and amphibious vehicles for Marine Corps' replacements, and ship's store stock. She arrived in Pearl Harbor on the 16th. She delivered cargo both at Pearl Harbor and at Hilo on the island of Hawaii before departing the islands on 1 May. Brevard reached Eniwetok on the 11th but departed again on the 13th. Her next stop was Guam where she remained from 17 May to 7 June. From there, she moved to Ulithi Atoll, in the Carolines, arriving on 8 June and staying until the 27th. She headed from Ulithi to the Palaus, where she paused between 29 June and 1 July.

=== End-of-war activity ===
Reaching Leyte on 2 July, Brevard spent the next seven weeks there, during which time hostilities with Japan ceased, allowing her commanding officer to observe later that "the ship neither encountered nor observed the enemy." Departing Leyte on 19 August, Brevard steamed to Ulithi, where she stopped over from 24 August to 3 September, and to the Marianas, where she stayed from 5 to 18 September. The cargo ship returned to Leyte on 23 September and remained there almost a month. On 19 October, she left Leyte on her way to occupation duty in China. Brevard arrived in Chinese waters on 28 October and provided logistics support for the occupation troops.

=== Post-war return Stateside and decommissioning ===
On 22 January 1946, Brevard left Shanghai and sailed for the United States. On that day, beginning at 1520 Brevard crew rescued 4,296 Japanese civilian repatriots from the ship Enoshima Maru as it sank near Shanghai. Later called an incredible "act of humanity" by the Embassy of Japan, this rescue was completed by 1550—in less than 30 minutes—and is listed by Guinness for "Most people rescued at sea. (civilians)". [NOTE: Guinness has date wrong. 22 January 1946 is correct and taken directly from RESTRICTED copies of ship's record of this event.]

She stopped at Pearl Harbor from 16 February to 2 March. She then continued her voyage to the west coast, reaching San Francisco, California, on 14 March. Although slated to proceed thence to Norfolk, Virginia, to be returned to the United States Maritime Commission and be laid up in the James River, Virginia, to relieve the workload of yards on the U.S. East Coast, Brevard received orders the next day to proceed instead to Olympia, Washington, where she was decommissioned and returned to the Maritime Commission on 3 July 1946. Her name was struck from the Navy list on 8 October 1946.

== Maritime Commission sale to Netherlands ==
On 5 July 1946, Brevard entered the Reserve Fleet at Olympia, Washington, remaining there until withdrawn 17 February 1947, and delivered under a General Agency Agreement to American Mail Lines. On 17 March 1947, the ship was sold for $693,826 to the Netherlands. The ship was renamed Zeehond and in 1948, was sold to Koninglijke Nederlandsche Stoomboot Mj. to be named Leila B until being sold to Saudi Arabian owners in 1962, to continue to operate under that name.

She was scrapped in 1970.

== Military awards and honors ==
The record does not indicate any battle stars for Brevard. However, her crew was eligible for the following medals:

- China Service Medal (extended)
- American Campaign Medal
- Asiatic–Pacific Campaign Medal
- World War II Victory Medal
- Navy Occupation Service Medal (with Asia clasp)
- Philippines Liberation Medal

== Notes ==
Citations

== Bibliography ==
Books

- Guinness World Records 2009. Random House. 2009. p. 151. ISBN 9780553592566.

Online resources

- Mann, Raymond A. (7 December 2005). "Brevard". Dictionary of American Naval Fighting Ships. Naval History and Heritage Command. This article incorporates text from this source, which is in the public domain.
- "C1 Cargo Ships". ShipbuildingHistory.com. 28 August 2009.
- Maritime Administration. "Brevard". Ship History Database Vessel Status Card. U.S. Department of Transportation, Maritime Administration.
- "USS Brevard (AK-164)". NavSource. 18 July 2014.
