= Floridana Beach, Florida =

Unincorporated community in Florida, U.S.

Coordinates: 27°56′47″N 80°29′44″W

Floridana Beach is an unincorporated community in Brevard County, Florida, United States. It is located on a barrier island southeast of the city of Melbourne and east of the town of Grant-Valkaria. It is just south of the unincorporated community of Melbourne Shores, and north of the unincorporated community of Sunnyland Beach.

The community is part of the Palm Bay–Melbourne–Titusville Metropolitan Statistical Area.
