= Barefoot Bay, Florida =

- Unincorporated community
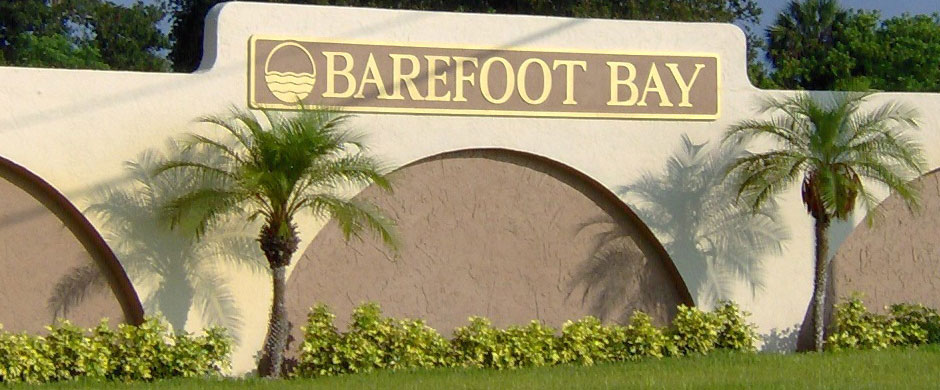
- Interactive map of Barefoot Bay, Florida
- Coordinates: 27°53′10″N 80°30′51″W
- Country: United States of America
- State: Florida
- County: Brevard

Government
  - Type: • Recreation district • Water and sewer district

Population (2010)
  - Total: 9,808
- Time zone: UTC-5 (Eastern (EST))
  - Summer (DST): UTC-4 (EDT)
- ZIP code: 32976
- Area code: 772
- Website: bbrd.org

Barefoot Bay is an unincorporated, deed-restricted manufactured home community, recreation district, and water and sewer district in southern Brevard County, Florida. The population at the 2010 United States census was 9,808.

Barefoot Bay is the largest manufactured home community in the state of Florida. It is located entirely within the unincorporated community of Micco on the Indian River Lagoon. It is part of the Palm Bay–Melbourne–Titusville Metropolitan Statistical Area. Most of the residents are retirees & snowbirds. The nearest commercial area is in Sebastian in Indian River County. Barefoot Bay shares the 32976 Sebastian zipcode as well as the 772 area code.

== Geography ==
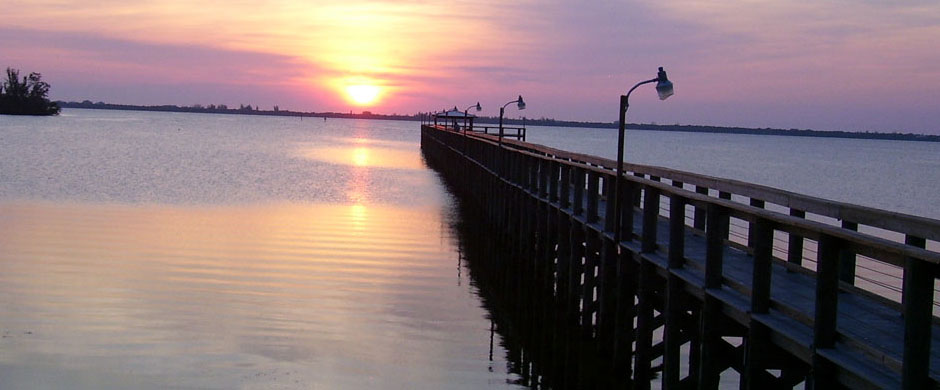
Barefoot Bay Pier

=== Demographics ===
As of the census of 2010, there were 9,808 people.

As of the census of 2000, there were 5,108 housing units. The racial makeup was 98.9% White, 0.5% African American, and 0.4% from two or more races. The population was primarily retirees and senior citizens, over the age of 65. The median age was 49.2 years. Gender was close to even, with 47.4% being male, and 52.6% female.

== Notable people ==
- Bruce Alger, former member of the United States House of Representatives from Texas's 5th congressional district; died 2015
