= Tropical Park, Florida =

- Census-designated place
- Location within Florida Location within the United States
- Coordinates: 28°22′37″N 80°42′26″W
- Country: United States
- State: Florida
- County: Brevard

Area
  - Total: 0.55 sq mi (1.42 km^{2})
  - Land: 0.55 sq mi (1.42 km^{2})
  - Water: 0 sq mi (0.00 km^{2})
- Elevation: 10 ft (3.0 m)

Population (2020)
  - Total: 2,013
  - Density: 3,679.1/sq mi (1,420.52/km^{2})
- Time zone: UTC-5 (Eastern (EST))
  - Summer (DST): UTC-4 (EDT)
- ZIP Code: 32953 (Merritt Island)
- Area code: 321
- FIPS code: 12-72521
- GNIS feature ID: 2805194

Tropical Park is a census-designated place (CDP) in Brevard County, Florida, United States. It occupies a portion of Merritt Island, a barrier island, and is surrounded by the CDP of Merritt Island. Florida State Road 3 is the main highway in the area, forming the eastern edge of Tropical Park.

Tropical Park was first listed as a CDP prior to the 2020 census. The population was 2,013 at the 2020 census. It is part of the Palm Bay—Melbourne—Titusville, Florida Metropolitan Statistical Area.

== Demographics ==
Historical population
Census	Pop.	Note	%±
2020	2,013		—
U.S. Decennial Census

Tropical Park first appeared as a census designated place in the 2020 U.S. census.

=== 2020 census ===
As of the 2020 census, Tropical Park had a population of 2,013. The median age was 38.3 years. 26.3% of residents were under the age of 18 and 16.4% of residents were 65 years of age or older. For every 100 females there were 95.2 males, and for every 100 females age 18 and over there were 89.5 males age 18 and over.

100.0% of residents lived in urban areas, while 0.0% lived in rural areas.

There were 819 households in Tropical Park, of which 29.2% had children under the age of 18 living in them. Of all households, 21.7% were married-couple households, 31.7% were households with a male householder and no spouse or partner present, and 38.1% were households with a female householder and no spouse or partner present. About 38.4% of all households were made up of individuals and 13.9% had someone living alone who was 65 years of age or older.

There were 890 housing units, of which 8.0% were vacant. The homeowner vacancy rate was 2.4% and the rental vacancy rate was 5.4%.

Racial composition as of the 2020 census
Race	Number	Percent
White	871	43.3%
Black or African American	828	41.1%
American Indian and Alaska Native	6	0.3%
Asian	34	1.7%
Native Hawaiian and Other Pacific Islander	0	0.0%
Some other race	72	3.6%
Two or more races	202	10.0%
Hispanic or Latino (of any race)	260	12.9%
