= Melbourne Shores, Florida =

Unincorporated community in Florida, U.S.

Melbourne Shores is an unincorporated community in Brevard County, Florida, United States. It is located on a barrier island southeast of the city of Melbourne and east of the town of Grant-Valkaria. It is just north of the unincorporated community of Floridana Beach.

The community is part of the Palm Bay–Melbourne–Titusville Metropolitan Statistical Area.
