= St. Johns National Wildlife Refuge =

United States National Wildlife Refuge in Florida

- IUCN category V (protected landscape/seascape)
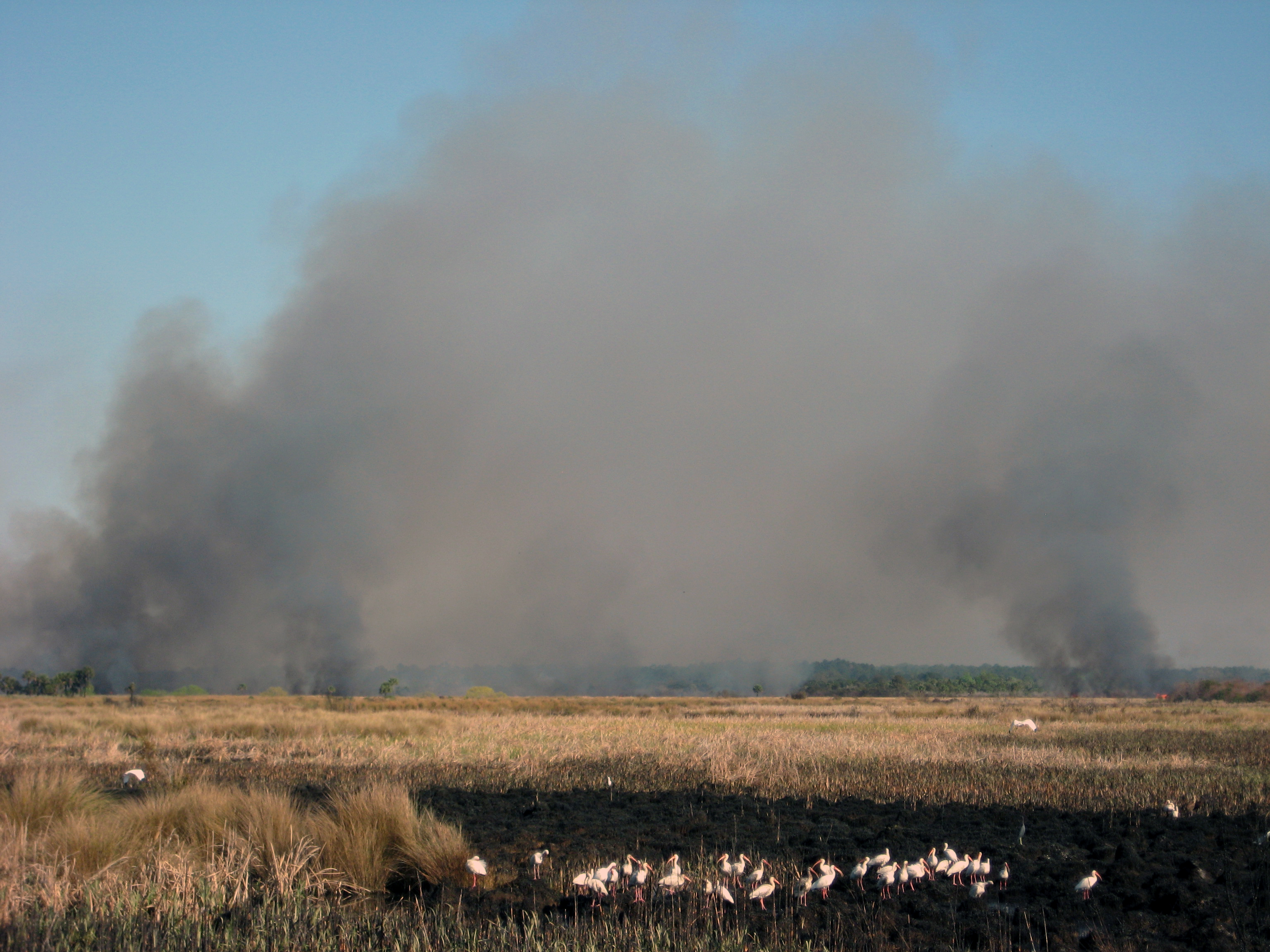
- Birds return to a marsh in St. Johns National Wildlife Refuge after a fire burned 1,800 acres over 4 days, February 2011

- Location within Florida Location within the United States
- Location: Brevard County, Florida, United States
- Nearest city: Titusville, Florida
- Coordinates: 28°33′30″N 80°53′15″W
- Area: 6,255 acres (2,531 ha)
- Established: 1971
- Governing body: US Fish & Wildlife Service
- Website: St. Johns National Wildlife Refuge

The St. Johns National Wildlife Refuge is part of the United States National Wildlife Refuge System, located off SR 50 just west of Titusville. The 6,255 acre (25 km^{2}) refuge was established in 1971 to protect the now extinct dusky seaside sparrow, Ammodramus maritimus nigrescens. It is administered as part of Merritt Island National Wildlife Refuge.
