= Cocoa West, Florida =

- CDP
- Location in Brevard County and the state of Florida
- Coordinates: 28°21′37″N 80°45′46″W
- Country: United States
- State: Florida
- County: Brevard

Area
  - Total: 3.65 sq mi (9.45 km^{2})
  - Land: 3.65 sq mi (9.45 km^{2})
  - Water: 0 sq mi (0.00 km^{2})
- Elevation: 16 ft (4.9 m)

Population (2020)
  - Total: 5,939
  - Density: 1,627.2/sq mi (628.25/km^{2})
- Time zone: UTC-5 (Eastern (EST))
  - Summer (DST): UTC-4 (EDT)
- FIPS code: 12-13225
- GNIS ID: 2402784

Cocoa West is a census-designated place (CDP) in Brevard County, Florida, United States. The population was 5,939 at the 2020 census, up from 5,925 at the 2010 census. It is the closest place to Lake Poinsett and Canaveral Groves. Cocoa West is part of the Palm Bay–Melbourne–Titusville, Florida Metropolitan Statistical Area.

== Geography ==
According to the United States Census Bureau, the CDP has a total area of 3.6 square miles (9.4 km^{2}), all of it land.

== Demographics ==
Historical population
Census	Pop.	Note	%±
1990	6,160		—
2000	5,921		−3.9%
2010	5,925		0.1%
2020	5,939		0.2%
U.S. Decennial Census

=== 2020 census ===
As of the 2020 census, Cocoa West had a population of 5,939. The median age was 38.8 years. 25.2% of residents were under the age of 18 and 16.1% of residents were 65 years of age or older. For every 100 females there were 95.1 males, and for every 100 females age 18 and over there were 91.2 males age 18 and over.

100.0% of residents lived in urban areas, while 0.0% lived in rural areas.

There were 2,249 households in Cocoa West, of which 31.8% had children under the age of 18 living in them. Of all households, 32.4% were married-couple households, 22.4% were households with a male householder and no spouse or partner present, and 35.7% were households with a female householder and no spouse or partner present. About 27.7% of all households were made up of individuals and 10.4% had someone living alone who was 65 years of age or older.

There were 2,469 housing units, of which 8.9% were vacant. The homeowner vacancy rate was 2.8% and the rental vacancy rate was 4.0%.

Racial composition as of the 2020 census
Race	Number	Percent
White	2,590	43.6%
Black or African American	2,300	38.7%
American Indian and Alaska Native	47	0.8%
Asian	23	0.4%
Native Hawaiian and Other Pacific Islander	3	0.1%
Some other race	481	8.1%
Two or more races	495	8.3%
Hispanic or Latino (of any race)	981	16.5%

=== 2000 census ===
As of the 2000 census, there were 5,921 people, 2,237 households, and 1,521 families residing in the CDP. The population density was 1,383.0 inhabitants per square mile (534.0/km^{2}). There were 2,537 housing units at an average density of 592.6 per square mile (228.8/km^{2}). The racial makeup of the CDP was 55.16% White, 40.89% African American, 0.64% Native American, 0.25% Asian, 0.12% Pacific Islander, 1.25% from other races, and 1.69% from two or more races. Hispanic or Latino of any race were 3.53% of the population.

There were 2,237 households, out of which 32.5% had children under the age of 18 living with them, 37.6% were married couples living together, 23.2% had a female householder with no husband present, and 32.0% were non-families. 25.7% of all households were made up of individuals, and 8.1% had someone living alone who was 65 years of age or older. The average household size was 2.63 and the average family size was 3.11.

In the CDP, the population was spread out, with 29.3% under the age of 18, 8.4% from 18 to 24, 29.5% from 25 to 44, 22.8% from 45 to 64, and 10.0% who were 65 years of age or older. The median age was 34 years. For every 100 females, there were 97.5 males. For every 100 females age 18 and over, there were 93.4 males.

The median income for a household in the CDP was $28,094, and the median income for a family was $32,188. Males had a median income of $29,714 versus $20,423 for females. The per capita income for the CDP was $12,964. About 21.7% of families and 26.8% of the population were below the poverty line, including 43.9% of those under age 18 and 15.0% of those age 65 or over.
