= Life Choices with Erie Chapman =

Life Choices with Erie Chapman and Kathleen Sullivan

Life Choices with Erie Chapman is a syndicated television show on health topics. The weekly, half-hour series was produced from 1987 to 1995 and was designed to motivate and inspire viewers to make choices resulting in a healthier lifestyle.

Life Choices began in 1987 as a locally produced program on WSYX-TV-6 in Columbus, Ohio - as a Phil Donahue-style forum for topical health issues, from fad diets to coping with stress. Later, the program become a magazine interview format, and in 1990, its producers expanded their efforts to take the weekly television show to a national audience. It entered its first season of syndication in 1992.

The show was hosted by Erie Chapman, author of Radical Loving Care and then chief executive of Riverside Methodist Hospital and U.S. Health Corp., now OhioHealth. Co-hosts included Kathleen Sullivan, (a former ABC News anchor), and Robin Young (a correspondent for NBC Nightly News, Today, and CBS This Morning. The show regularly featured segments with popular psychologist Dr. Joyce Brothers.

At its peak, Life Choices was seen in about one-third of the United States, in such major markets as Los Angeles, Boston, Seattle and Denver. The show also was seen in the former Soviet Union.

Two spin-off radio shows also aired, including a celebrity show and a live call-in program broadcast on WBNS (1460 AM)

Beginning in November, 1990, the program originated from Mills James Productions in a studio originally built as a permanent home for the weekly production.

Life Choices was produced by a staff of 16 at a nonprofit U.S. Health subsidiary, U.S. Health Productions Co., and received a number of awards, including 10 television Emmy awards for broadcasting excellence.

Past episodes of Life Choices are kept in the corporate archives of OhioHealth in Columbus, Ohio.

== Notes and references ==
- https://digital-collections.columbuslibrary.org/digital/collection/p16802coll35/id/158722/
