= Fire lane =

Pavement reserved for fire and rescue services

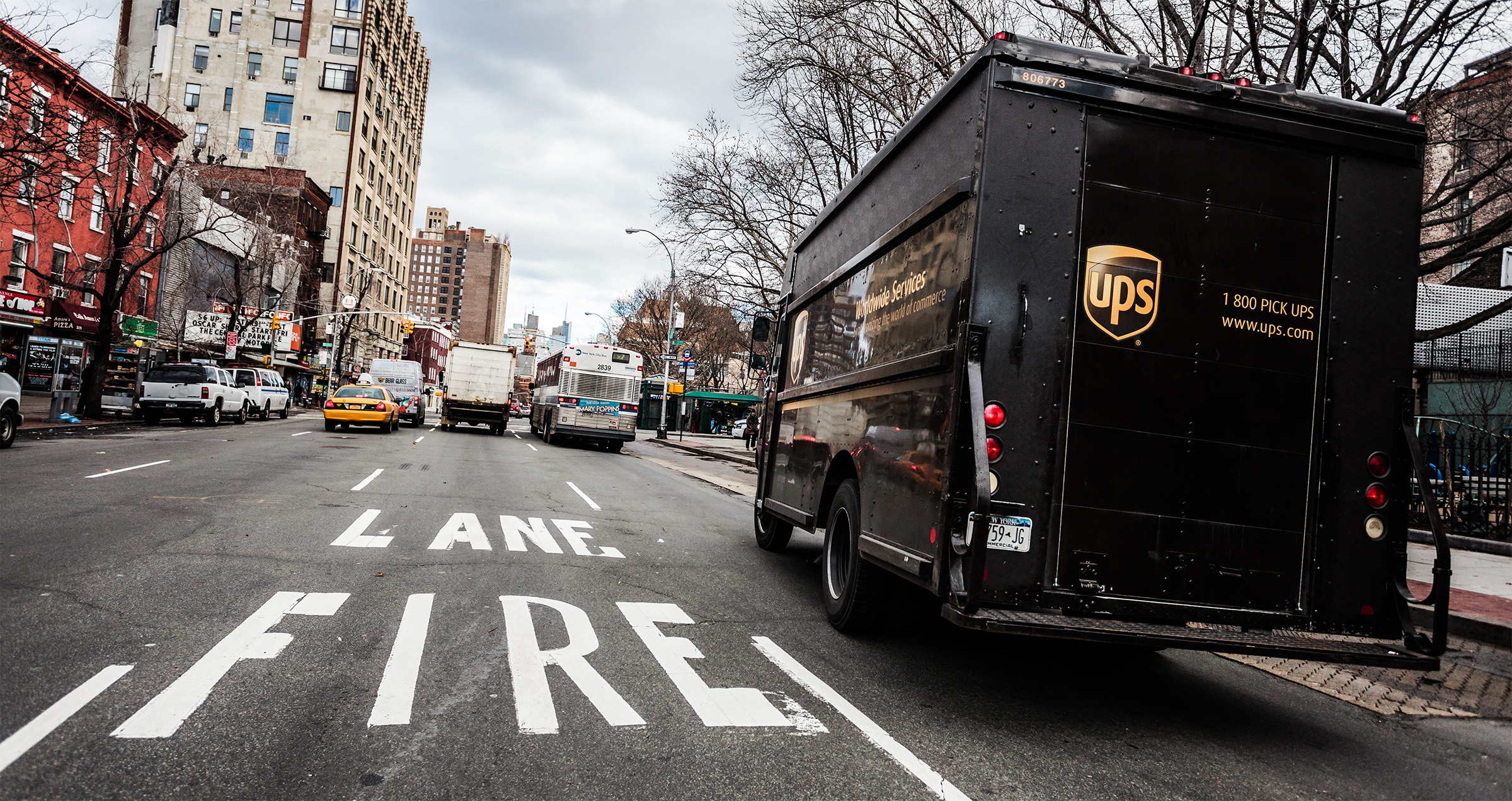
A fire lane on 6th Avenue (Avenue of the Americas) in New York City.

A fire lane is a pavement reserved for fire and rescue services. Dedicated fire lanes primarily appear in urban areas where traffic jams may slow their passage, thus causing an unfavorable delay in responding to distress calls. Other fire lanes, such as in outdoor parking lots in front of buildings, are open to other vehicular traffic, but serve the purpose of ensuring fire trucks’ maneuverability.

== Infrastructure ==
=== End ===
Fire trucks and other apparatuses are usually large and heavy vehicles. Because safely accelerating and steering requires lots of space and their load sets high demands to the pavement, there must be certain accommodations made for them. By legally mandating erection of fire lanes, authorities can ensure firefighters fast and reliable access to potential sites of emergencies.

Fire lanes also provide clear space for egress from a burning building and should therefore be wider for larger occupancy buildings.

=== Markings ===
The following is applicable only to the United States of America

All fire lanes must be marked as such, although the manner of marking may be different.

A fire lane that runs along the center of a street is marked “Fire Lane”.

If the lane is 20 feet (6.1m) across, it must be marked on both sides with red paint on the curb. If the fire lane is between 20 (6.1m) and 24 feet (7.3m), it may only be marked on one side of the roadway. If the access road is greater than 28 feet (8.5m) wide, no markings need to be present.

Fire lanes in front of commercial buildings may have yellow paint to mark the fire lane. The curb should be painted yellow with the words “No Parking, Fire Lane” painted in black. On the pavement, yellow lines should be painted the width of the fire lane, with the words 12 inches (30cm) tall and painted in yellow.

=== Dimensioning ===
The following is applicable only to the United States of America

There are certain requirements that must be met when designing a fire lane. These can vary from jurisdiction to jurisdiction, yet they are generally similar.

Fire lanes may be any width larger than 20 feet (6.1m) across. This gives enough room to maneuver the truck into position. They must also be at least ten feet away from any building or structure overhang to allow overhead clearance. If trees are near a fire lane, they must be trimmed to allow a 14-foot (4.25m) clearance over the fire lane. The fire lane must be within 150 feet (45.7) of the ends of the buildings that it serves. If a fire lane goes around a curve or corner, it must have an outside turning radius of 54 feet (16.5m), and an inside turning radius of 30 feet (9m). These numbers can be a little different depending on the jurisdiction, but are usually roughly the same. The fire lanes must also be approved to carry at least 35 imperial tons (22.6 tonnes) of weight.

Furthermore, different standards may apply for operators of airports, harbors or industrial plants.

=== Dead ends ===
It is preferable for a fire lane to have access at both ends to a road. If that is not possible and a fire lane must be made into a dead end, a fire lane turnaround is put in. It must be large enough for a fire truck to turn around to head out the same way it came in. They can be made as a large circle, or in the shape of a Y, T or a sideways T. They must be marked with either paint striping, signs, or the use of both. Striping consists of a six-inch red stripe painted on the curb with four-inch white letters indicating that this is a fire lane. “No Parking, Fire Lane” is to be printed every 25 feet (7.62m) along the fire lane.

== Usage ==
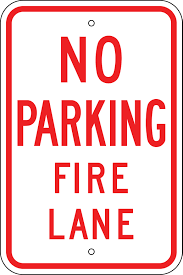
A road sign prohibiting parking in a fire lane.

=== Traffic ===
Fire lanes (as part of a multi-lane street) are not intended for normal vehicle traffic. Parking is prohibited in fire lanes to ensure the access of safety equipment to the structure in the event of an emergency.

=== Availability ===
Dedicated fire lanes are particularly prevalent in the United States of America. Other territories do not build roads just for emergency services. Instead, bus lanes may be set up with fire truck requirements in mind. On important roads stopping restrictions may be imposed if they would otherwise become too narrow to navigate with heavy vehicles at speed.

== See also ==
- Bus lane
- High-occupancy vehicle lane
