= Merritt Island National Wildlife Refuge =

Protected area in Florida, US

- IUCN category IV (habitat/species management area)
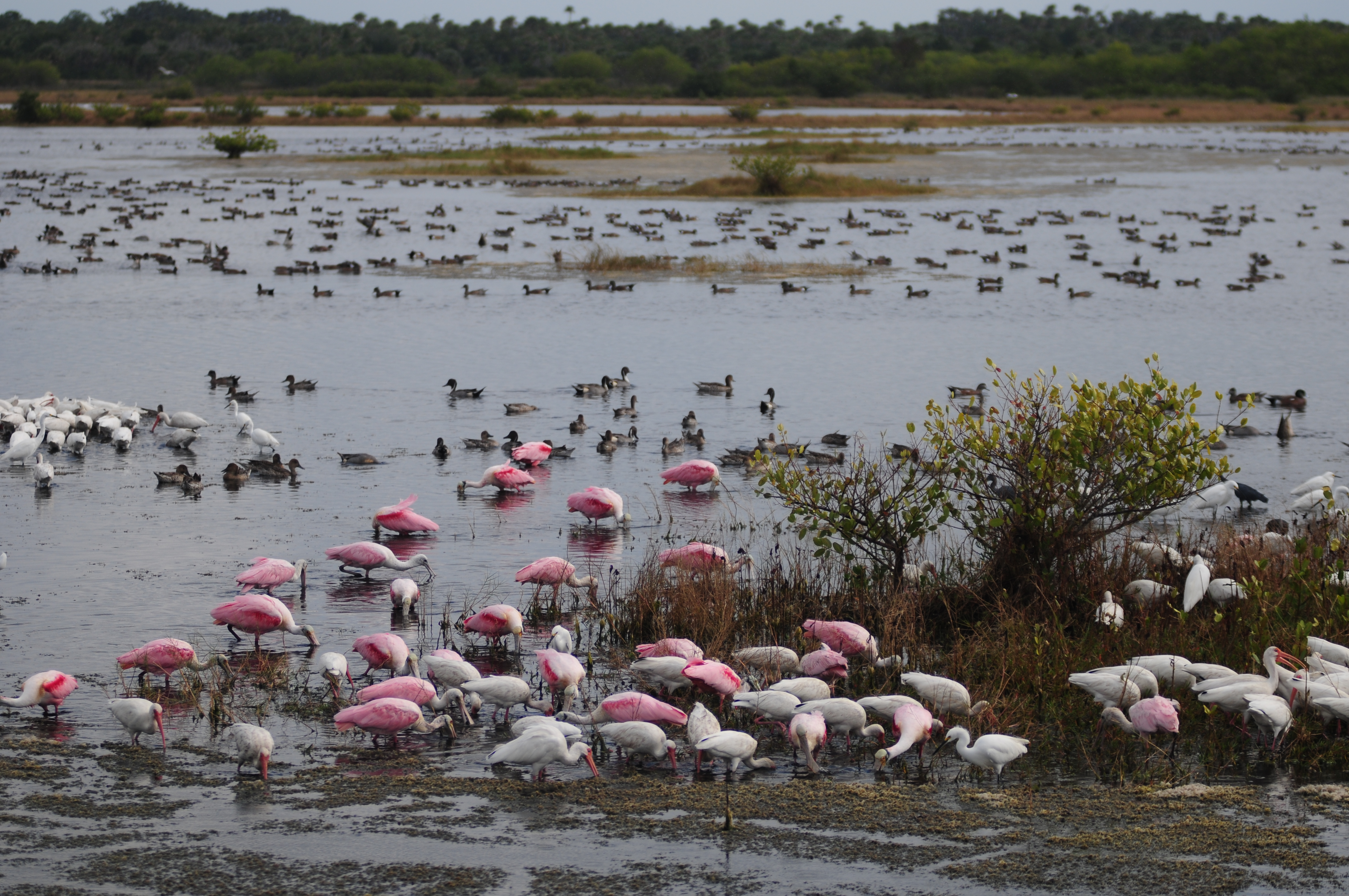
- Ibises, roseate spoonbills and egrets at Merritt Island National Wildlife Reserve, Florida United States.

- Location within the United States
- Location: Merritt Island, Brevard County, Florida, United States
- Nearest city: Titusville, Florida
- Coordinates: 28°31′N 80°40′W
- Area: 140,000 acres (570 km^{2})
- Established: 1963
- Governing body: U.S. Fish and Wildlife Service
- Website: Merritt Island National Wildlife Refuge

Merritt Island National Wildlife Refuge is a 140,000-acre (57,000 ha) U.S. National Wildlife Refuge (NWR) on the Atlantic coast of Florida's largest barrier island. NASA's Kennedy Space Center and visitor complex are also situated on the island and NASA can restrict access to the refuge based on its operational needs.

The NWR contains over 1000 species of plants, 117 species of fish, 68 amphibians and reptiles, 330 birds, and 31 mammal species, of which 21 species are listed as endangered by the state of Florida or by the US federal government. Management of the NWR is provided through the Merritt Island NWR Complex, which provides hiking and driving trails for the public, subject to access restrictions from NASA. It is a 'gateway site' for the Great Florida Birding Trail.

== Location and extent ==
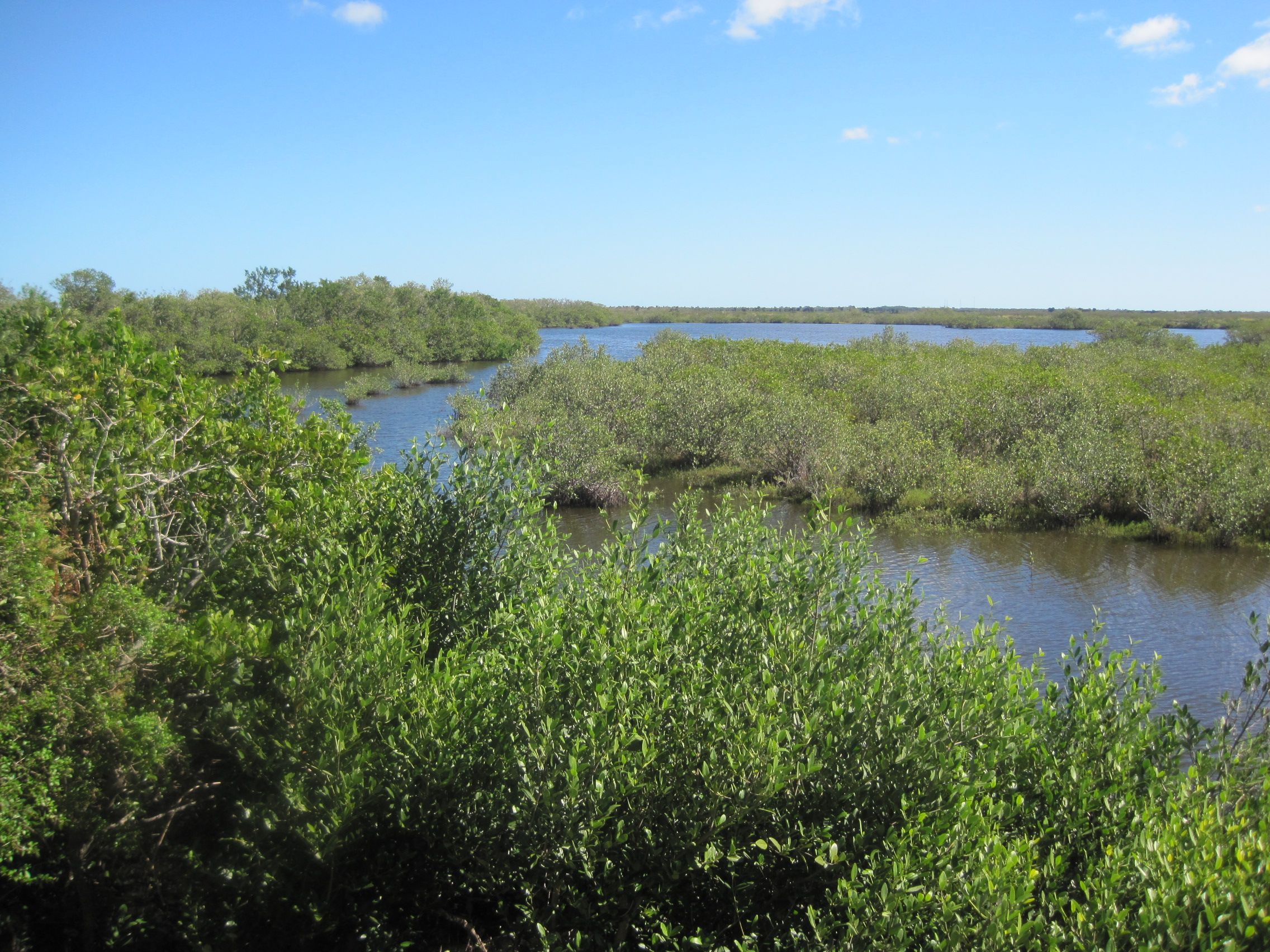
View of refuge from Max Brewer Memorial Parkway near Gator Creek

Merritt Island National Wildlife Refuge is located due east of Titusville on Merritt Island in Brevard County, Florida, and occupies 140,000 acres (570 km^{2}), overlaid with the Kennedy Space Center. To the north, it borders on the Canaveral National Seashore; to the south it encompasses non-public portions of the Kennedy Space Center (with which it also shares some history), which in turn abuts Cape Canaveral Space Force Station. Mosquito Lagoon and the Indian River run through the refuge. Since public access to all these areas is controlled in various ways, the refuge is part of a very substantial area of relatively undisturbed wildlife habitat.

== History ==
The land occupied by the NWR was acquired by NASA in the early 1960s for the development of the Space Center and its non-operational purposes. Until then, there had been little development in the area because of the high number of salt marsh mosquitoes. Public access is normally permitted, and several state highways run across the refuge. However, the public can be excluded if necessary for NASA's purposes, as is done in the days before a launch.

== Habitats and species ==
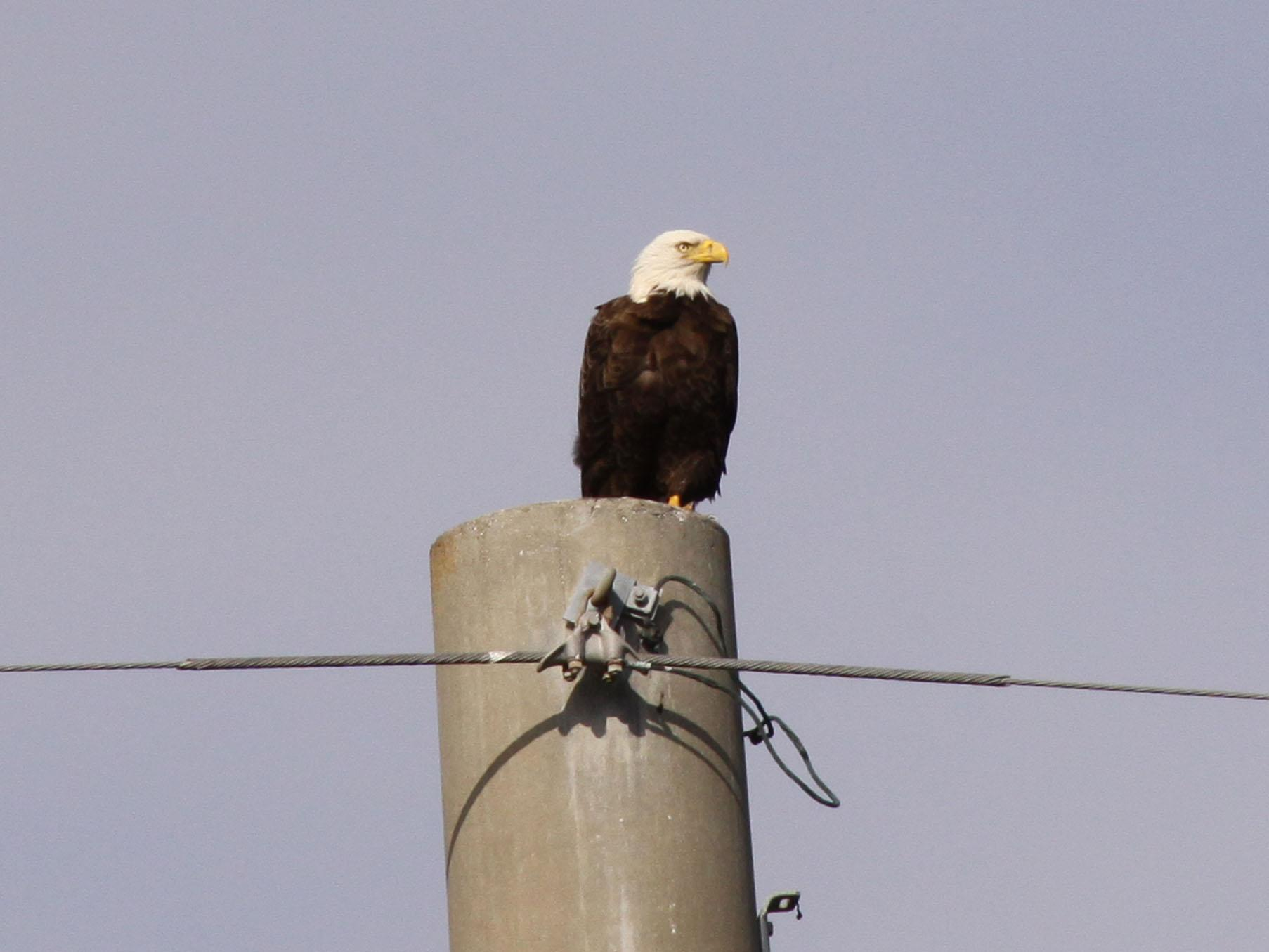
Bald eagles inhabit the refuge.

The refuge provides a range of habitats, from saltwater estuaries and freshwater impoundments and marshes, to dunes, hardwood hammocks, and scrub. It contains over 1000 species of plants, 117 species of fish, 68 amphibians and reptiles, 330 birds, and 31 mammal species. Of these species, 21 are listed as endangered either by the state of Florida or by the US federal government. The following are some of the more important species using the refuge; most of them nest there:

- Sea turtles including
  - Loggerhead sea turtle
  - Green turtle
- American alligator
- Osprey
- Bald eagle
- Many species of waterfowl use the refuge as a wintering ground; blue-winged teal and northern shoveler are resident in small numbers
- Many species of shorebirds, some resident and some using the refuge in the course of their migration
- Several species of rails
- Anhinga

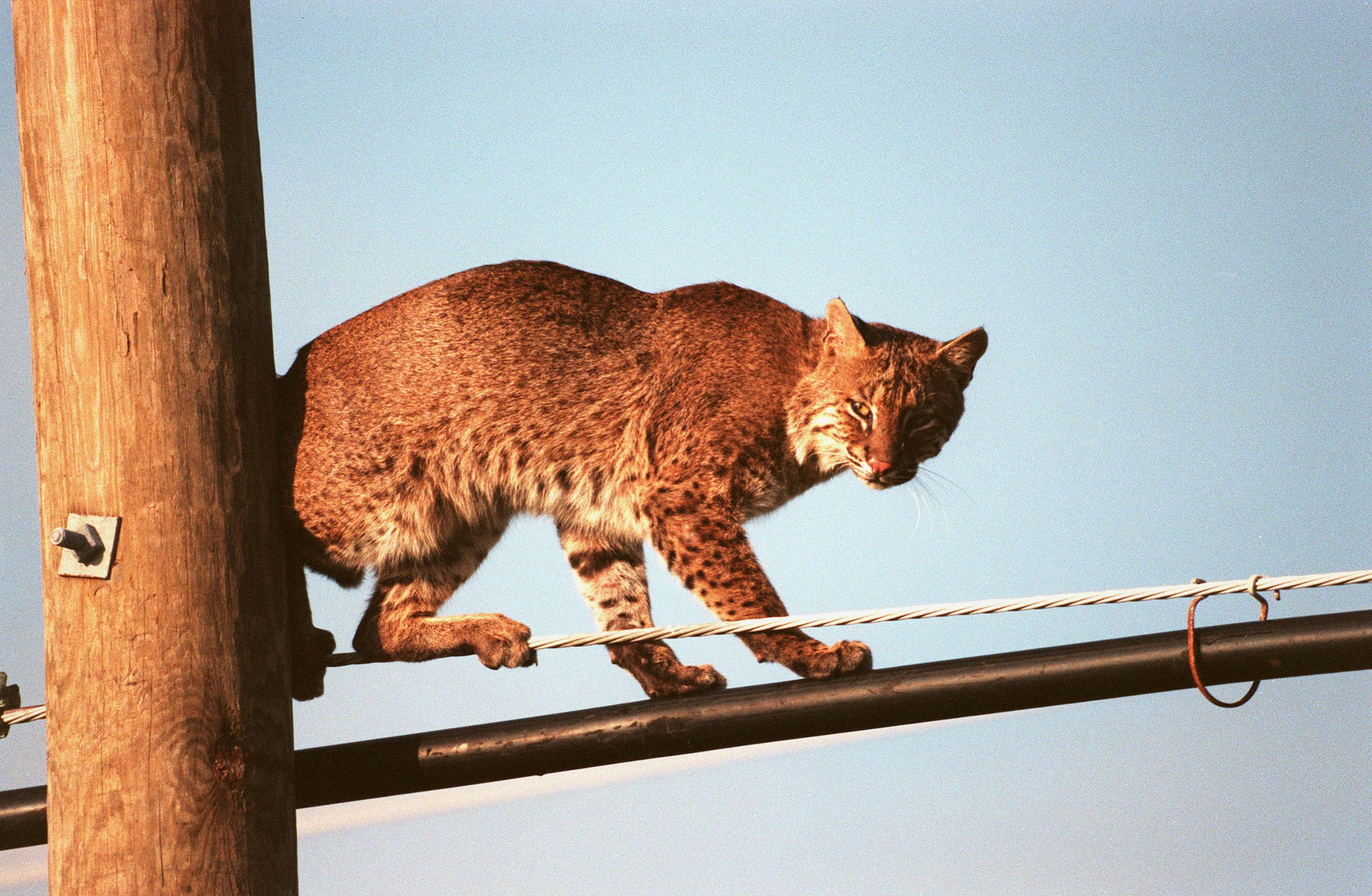
Bobcat in Kennedy Space Center

- Several species of heron and egret
- Glossy and white ibis
- Roseate spoonbill
- Florida scrub jay
- West Indian manatee
- Bobcat
- Dwarf siren, a recently discovered salamander

== Facilities ==
Subject to the needs of NASA, public access is relatively unrestricted, though it is only allowed during daylight hours; camping is only allowed for certain organized youth organizations.

The refuge provides hiking and driving trails for visitors, with opportunities for observing wildlife without causing disturbances; most of the species listed above can be seen by a casual visitor. An observation deck is provided near the drawbridge that carries State Road 3 over the Haulover Canal, in the northern part of the refuge, since manatees frequently congregate there. Boating is permitted on the waters around and within the refuge, and provides an opportunity for observing the wildlife. There are facilities for launching pleasure boats at several places. In addition the refuge includes, and gives access to Playalinda Beach on the outer barrier island. Fishing is generally permitted, and hunting for wildfowl is allowed on a strictly limited basis. There is a Visitor Center.

== Management ==
Merritt Island NWR Complex acted as an administrative center for a number of other NWR's in central Florida but since 2012 management of the Merritt Island NWR, St. Johns National Wildlife Refuge, and Lake Woodruff National Wildlife Refuge are administered by the Merritt Island NWR Complex located on SR 402, 5 miles east of Titusville, Florida.

The Lake Wales Ridge National Wildlife Refuge, Pelican Island National Wildlife Refuge, Archie Carr National Wildlife Refuge, and the Everglades Headwaters National Wildlife Refuge and Conservation Area are administered by the Everglades Headwaters National Wildlife Refuge Complex. headquartered in Vero Beach, Florida. Water levels are controlled in most of the refuge, to conserve its range of habitats. Controlled fires are used regularly.

== Roads in the refuge ==
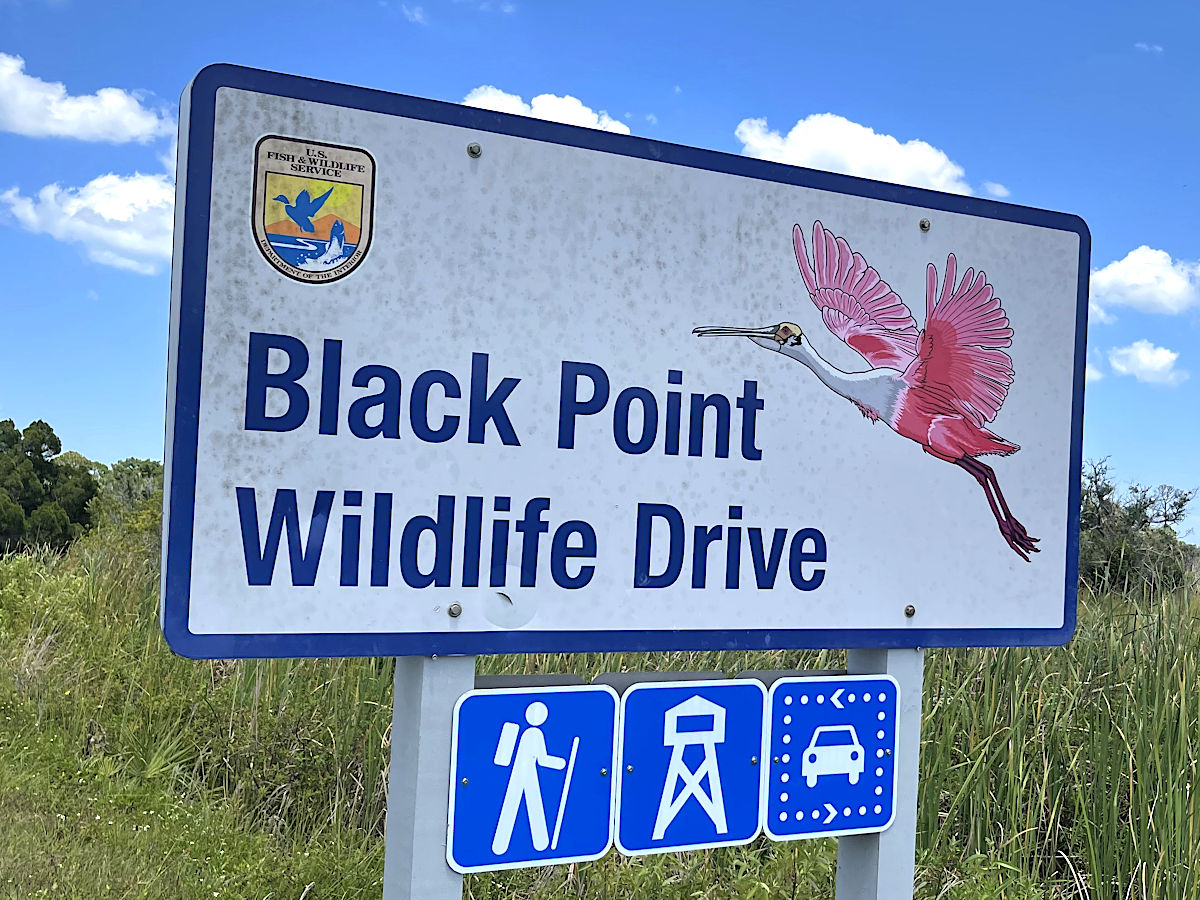
Black Point Wildlife Drive sign

Black Point Wildlife Drive is a one-way seven-mile dike road allowing wildlife viewing of the refuge

=== Kennedy Parkway ===
Kennedy Parkway traverses the John F. Kennedy Space Center and the refuge. In the John F. Kennedy Space Center, it is 12.21 miles (19.65 km) long with a divided highway. North of Beach Road, it is two lanes wide. In total, it is 28.36 miles (45.64 km) long, from the southern border of the Space Center to U.S. 1, near Oak Hill. North of Dummit Grove, it forms the western boundary of the Canaveral National Seashore.
