= Baptist Healing Trust =

Non-profit foundation in Tennessee

The Healing Trust is a non-profit foundation in Nashville, Tennessee, which provides grants to non-profits that provide healthcare access to vulnerable people and groups, mainly in Tennessee.

Established in 2002 out of the proceeds of the sale of the Baptist Hospital system to Ascension Health, the Trust awarded more than $60 million in grants during its first ten years of operation. Until 2008, the Trust was required to grant the majority of its investment income to the Baptist Hospital. The remainder of the investment income was given via grants to non-profit organizations in middle Tennessee providing healthcare access to vulnerable populations.

In 2024, the trust approved 142 grants to institutes in Tennessee, as well as one each in California, Colorado, Ohio and New York; these grants totalled over $4.6million.

The Trust is an independent private foundation and was not affiliated with Baptist Hospital or the Baptist Hospital Foundation.

In 2025, the trust welcomed a new chief executive officer, Sam Jackson.
