= National Register of Historic Places listings in Brevard County, Florida =

Location of Brevard County in Florida

This is a list of the National Register of Historic Places listings in Brevard County, Florida.

This is intended to be a complete list of the properties and districts on the National Register of Historic Places in Brevard County, Florida, United States. The locations of National Register properties and districts for which the latitude and longitude coordinates are included below, may be seen in a map.

There are 44 properties and districts listed on the National Register in the county, including 2 National Historic Landmarks. One property was once listed, but has since been removed.

This National Park Service list is complete through NPS recent listings posted August 7, 2026.

Contents: Counties in Florida (non-linked contain no National Register listings)
Alachua - Baker - Bay - Bradford - Brevard - Broward - Calhoun - Charlotte - Citrus - Clay - Collier - Columbia - DeSoto - Dixie - Duval - Escambia - Flagler - Franklin - Gadsden - Gilchrist - Glades - Gulf - Hamilton - Hardee - Hendry - Hernando - Highlands - Hillsborough (Tampa) - Holmes - Indian River - Jackson - Jefferson - Lafayette - Lake - Lee - Leon - Levy - Liberty - Madison - Manatee - Marion - Martin - Miami-Dade (Miami) - Monroe - Nassau - Okaloosa - Okeechobee - Orange - Osceola - Palm Beach - Pasco - Pinellas - Polk - Putnam - St. Johns - St. Lucie - Santa Rosa - Sarasota - Seminole - Sumter - Suwannee - Taylor - Union - Volusia - Wakulla - Walton - Washington

== Current listings ==
	Name on the Register	Image	Date listed	Location	City or town	Description
1	Aladdin Theater	Aladdin Theater	October 17, 1991 (#91001541)	300 Brevard Avenue; 28°21′19″N 80°43′35″W	Cocoa	
2	Barton Avenue Residential District	Barton Avenue Residential District	August 21, 1992 (#92001046)	11-59 Barton Avenue; 28°19′48″N 80°43′12″W	Rockledge	
3	Cape Canaveral Air Force Station	Cape Canaveral Air Force Station	April 16, 1984 (#84003872)	Launch Pads 5, 6, 13, 14, 19, 26, 34, and Mission Control Center; 28°28′26″N 80°34′28″W	Cocoa	
4	Central Instrumentation Facility	Central Instrumentation Facility	January 21, 2000 (#99001635)	Kennedy Space Center; 28°31′27″N 80°39′22″W	Merritt Island	
5	City Point Community Church	City Point Community Church	June 20, 1995 (#95000731)	3783 North Indian River Drive; 28°25′23″N 80°45′11″W	Cocoa	
6	Cocoa Junior High School	Cocoa Junior High School	April 3, 2019 (#100003581)	307 Blake Ave. 28°21′15″N 80°44′19″W	Cocoa	Part of the Florida's Historic Black Public Schools MPS
7	Cocoa Post Office	Cocoa Post Office	April 2, 2019 (#100003582)	435 Brevard Ave. 28°21′14″N 80°43′35″W	Cocoa	Part of the Florida's New Deal Resources MPS
8	Community Chapel of Melbourne Beach	Community Chapel of Melbourne Beach	May 14, 1992 (#92000505)	501 Ocean Avenue; 28°04′06″N 80°33′49″W	Melbourne Beach	
9	Crawlerway	Crawlerway	January 21, 2000 (#99001641)	Kennedy Space Center; 28°36′13″N 80°37′39″W	Merritt Island	
10	J. R. Field Homestead	J. R. Field Homestead	September 11, 1997 (#97001121)	750 Field Manor Drive; 28°23′53″N 80°43′00″W	Indianola	
11	Florida Power and Light Company Ice Plant	Florida Power and Light Company Ice Plant	November 17, 1982 (#82001033)	1604 South Harbor City Boulevard; 28°34′13″N 80°36′15″W	Melbourne	
12	William H. Gleason House	William H. Gleason House	January 25, 1997 (#96001608)	1736 Pineapple Avenue; 28°08′06″N 80°37′45″W	Melbourne	
13	Green Gables	Green Gables	May 18, 2016 (#16000269)	1501 South Harbor City; 28°05′06″N 80°36′22″W	Melbourne	
14	Headquarters Building	Headquarters Building	December 1, 2000 (#99001644)	Kennedy Space Center; 28°31′27″N 80°39′04″W	Merritt Island	
15	Dr. George E. Hill House	Dr. George E. Hill House	March 3, 1994 (#93000819)	870 Indianola Drive; 28°23′45″N 80°43′09″W	Merritt Island	
16	Hotel Mims	Hotel Mims	July 28, 1995 (#95000913)	3202 State Road 46; 28°39′54″N 80°50′46″W	Mims	
17	Imperial Towers Apartments		April 19, 2023 (#100006776)	2825 South Washington Ave. 28°35′00″N 80°48′02″W	Titusville	
18	Indian Fields		April 14, 1994 (#94000358)	Address Restricted	Titusville	
19	Jorgensen's General Store	Jorgensen's General Store	June 25, 1999 (#99000711)	5390 U.S. Route 1; 27°55′44″N 80°31′38″W	Grant-Valkaria	
20	La Grange Church and Cemetery	La Grange Church and Cemetery	December 7, 1995 (#95001413)	1575 Old Dixie Highway; 28°38′23″N 80°49′39″W	Titusville	
21	Launch Complex 39	Launch Complex 39	May 24, 1973 (#73000568)	Kennedy Space Center; 28°36′08″N 80°37′43″W	Titusville	
22	Launch Complex 39-Pad A	Launch Complex 39-Pad A	January 21, 2000 (#99001638)	Kennedy Space Center; 28°36′29″N 80°36′16″W	Merritt Island	
23	Launch Complex 39-Pad B	Launch Complex 39-Pad B	January 21, 2000 (#99001639)	Kennedy Space Center; 28°37′37″N 80°37′16″W	Merritt Island	
24	Launch Control Center	Launch Control Center	January 21, 2000 (#99001645)	Kennedy Space Center; 28°35′07″N 80°38′59″W	Merritt Island	
25	Melbourne Beach Pier	Melbourne Beach Pier	April 12, 1984 (#84000829)	Ocean Avenue and Riverside Drive; 28°04′05″N 80°34′05″W	Melbourne Beach	
26	Missile Crawler Transporter Facilities	Missile Crawler Transporter Facilities	January 21, 2000 (#99001643)	Kennedy Space Center; 28°35′11″N 80°38′57″W	Merritt Island	
27	Old Haulover Canal	Old Haulover Canal	December 19, 1978 (#78000262)	Address Restricted; 28°44′11″N 80°45′17″W	Merritt Island	
28	Old St. Luke's Episcopal Church and Cemetery	Old St. Luke's Episcopal Church and Cemetery	June 15, 1990 (#90000848)	5555 North Tropical Trail; 28°27′26″N 80°43′03″W	Courtenay	
29	Operations and Checkout Building	Operations and Checkout Building	January 21, 2000 (#99001636)	Kennedy Space Center; 28°31′25″N 80°38′47″W	Merritt Island	
30	Persimmon Mound		April 14, 1994 (#94000357)	River Lakes Conservation Area, approximately 10 miles southwest of Rockledge; 28°13′08″N 80°51′06″W	Rockledge	Prehistoric mound site.
31	Porcher House	Porcher House	January 6, 1986 (#86000023)	434 Delannoy Avenue; 28°21′45″N 80°43′32″W	Cocoa	
32	Press Site–Clock and Flag Pole	Press Site–Clock and Flag Pole	January 21, 2000 (#99001637)	Kennedy Space Center; 28°34′56″N 80°38′44″W	Merritt Island	
33	Pritchard House	Pritchard House	January 12, 1990 (#89002167)	424 South Washington Avenue; 28°36′37″N 80°48′28″W	Titusville	
34	Judge George Robbins House	Judge George Robbins House	January 12, 1990 (#89002168)	703 Indian River Avenue; 28°36′27″N 80°48′23″W	Titusville	
35	Rockledge Drive Residential District	Rockledge Drive Residential District	August 21, 1992 (#92001045)	15-23 Rockledge Avenue, 219-1361 Rockledge Drive, and 1-11 Orange Avenue; 28°20′14″N 80°43′13″W	Rockledge	
36	James Wadsworth Rossetter House	James Wadsworth Rossetter House	July 27, 2005 (#05000734)	1328 Houston Street; 28°07′42″N 80°37′34″W	Melbourne	
37	Spell House	Spell House	January 12, 1990 (#89002166)	1200 Riverside Drive; 28°36′07″N 80°48′22″W	Titusville	
38	St. Gabriel's Episcopal Church	St. Gabriel's Episcopal Church	December 5, 1972 (#72000302)	414 Palm Avenue; 28°36′28″N 80°48′39″W	Titusville	
39	St. Joseph's Catholic Church	St. Joseph's Catholic Church	December 3, 1987 (#87000816)	Miller Street, Northeast; 28°02′00″N 80°35′12″W	Palm Bay	
40	Titusville Commercial District	Titusville Commercial District	January 10, 1990 (#89002164)	Roughly bounded by Julia Street, Hopkins Avenue, Main Street, and Indian River Avenue; 28°36′43″N 80°48′26″W	Titusville	
41	Valencia Subdivision Residential District	Valencia Subdivision Residential District	August 21, 1992 (#92001047)	14-140 Valencia Road, 825-827 Osceola Drive, and 24-28 Orange Avenue; 28°20′11″N 80°43′18″W	Rockledge	
42	Vehicle Assembly Building-High Bay and Low Bay	Vehicle Assembly Building-High Bay and Low Bay	January 21, 2000 (#99001642)	Kennedy Space Center; 28°35′08″N 80°39′05″W	Merritt Island	
43	Wager House	Wager House	January 10, 1990 (#89002165)	621 Indian River Avenue; 28°36′29″N 80°48′23″W	Titusville	
44	Windover Archeological Site (8BR246)	Windover Archeological Site (8BR246)	April 20, 1987 (#87000810)	Address Restricted	Titusville	

== Former listings ==
	Name on the Register	Image	Date listed	Date removed	Location	City or town	Description
1	Marion S. Whaley Citrus Packing House	Marion S. Whaley Citrus Packing House	April 8, 1993 (#93000286)	January 26, 2021	2275 U.S. Route 1; 28°18′46″N 80°42′37″W	Rockledge	

== See also ==
- List of National Historic Landmarks in Florida
- National Register of Historic Places listings in Florida
