= Florida State Road 406 =

Highway in Florida, United States

State Road 406
- Garden Street
- SR 406 in red, CR 406 in blue

Route information
- Maintained by FDOT
- Length: 2.949 mi (4.746 km)
- Existed: 1945–present

Major junctions
- West end: I-95 in Titusville
- East end: CR 402 in Titusville

Location
- Country: United States
- State: Florida
- Counties: Brevard

Highway system
- Florida State Highway System; Interstate; US; State; Former; Pre‑1945; Toll; Scenic
← SR 405	→ SR 407

State Road 406 (SR 406), also known as Garden Street, is an east–west road in northern Titusville that connects Interstate 95 (I-95 or SR 9) to U.S. Route 1 (US 1 or SR 5). West of I-95, Garden Street is unsigned County Road 406 (CR 406), with its western terminus at Carpenter Road. East of US 1, it becomes A. Max Brewer Memorial Parkway, part of the Indian River Lagoon Scenic Highway.

== Major intersections ==
The entire route is in Titusville, Brevard County.

mi	km	Destinations	Notes
0.000	0.000	west end of state maintenance	
0.15	0.24	I-95 (SR 9) – Jacksonville, Miami	I-95 exit 220
2.285	3.677	Park Avenue (CR 405)	
2.903	4.672	US 1 south (Hopkins Avenue / SR 5) – Titusville Historic District	
2.949	4.746	US 1 north (Washington Avenue / SR 5)	Eastern end of state maintenance; becomes County Road 402
1.000 mi = 1.609 km; 1.000 km = 0.621 mi
