= Titusville =

Titusville is the name of several places:

== United States ==
- Titusville, Florida
- Titusville Negro School in Titusville, Florida
- Titusville, Birmingham, Alabama
- Titusville, New Jersey
- Titusville, a former community in Malone (town), New York
- Titusville, Pennsylvania

== Canada ==
- Titusville, New Brunswick
