= Taylor-Dunn House =

- Interactive map of the Taylor-Dunn House area

General information
- Type: Wood
- Architectural style: Florida vernacular architecture
- Location: Main Street; Titusville, Florida
- Coordinates: 28°37′40.3″N 80°49′25.2″W
- Construction started: 1910

The Taylor-Dunn House is a historic U.S. home located at the Parrish Medical Center on Main Street, Titusville, Florida. Arthur Dunn built the home in 1910 and he lived there with his wife Mayme Lewis Taylor Dunn. Arthur Dunn served as a Brevard County Commissioner for 24 years and significantly contributed to the creation of Arthur Dunn Airpark. Mayme Lewis Taylor Dunn descended from one of the first families to settle in Brevard County. The family owned the house for 91 years and it was moved to the Parrish Medical Center campus.
