= Titusville MPS =

- U.S. National Register of Historic Places
- Location within Florida Location within the United States
- Location: Titusville, Florida
- Coordinates: 28°35′28″N 80°49′12″W
- MPS: Titusville Multiple Property Group
- NRHP reference No.: 64500127

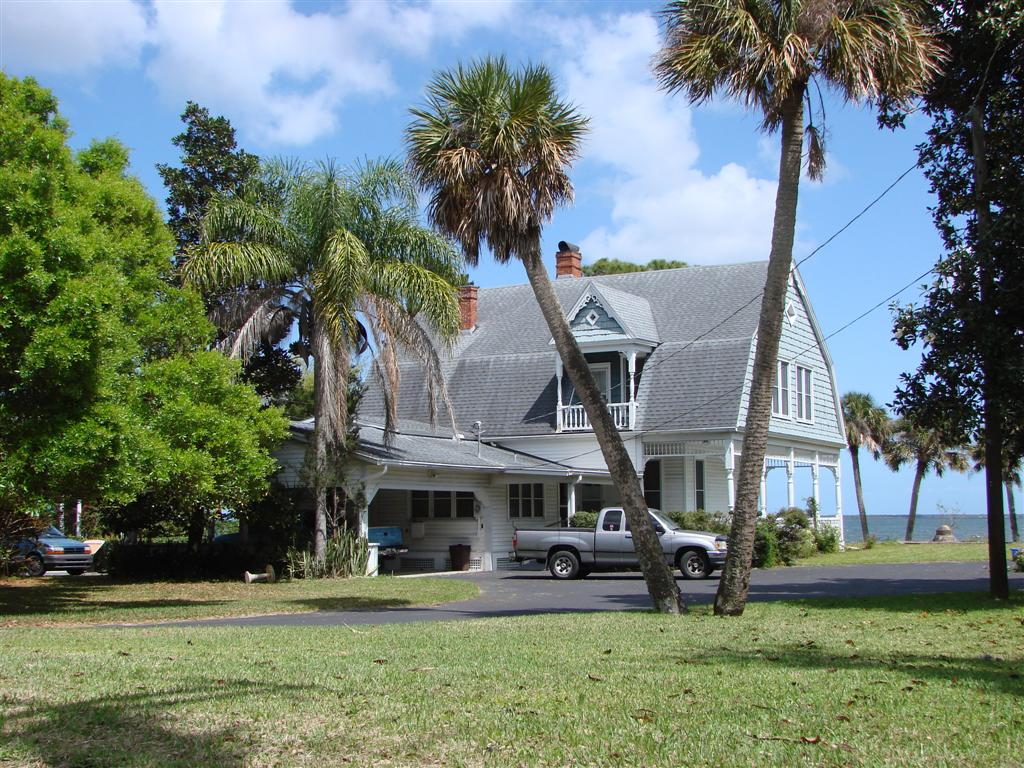
Judge George Robbins House in 2007

The following buildings were added to the National Register of Historic Places as part of the Titusville Multiple Property Submission (or MPS).

Resource Name	Also known as	Address	City	County	Added
Pritchard House		424 South Washington Avenue	Titusville	Brevard County	January 12, 1990
Judge George Robbins House		703 Indian River Avenue	Titusville	Brevard County	January 12, 1990
Spell House		1200 Riverside Drive	Titusville	Brevard County	January 12, 1990
Titusville Commercial District		Roughly bounded by Julia Street, Hopkins Avenue, Main Street, and Indian River Avenue	Titusville	Brevard County	January 10, 1990
Wager House		621 Indian River Avenue	Titusville	Brevard County	January 10, 1990
