= Tropical Wonderland =

Former amusement park in Titusville, Florida

- Previously known as Florida Wonderland
- Interactive map of Tropical Wonderland
- Location: Titusville, Florida, USA
- Coordinates: 28.554198°N 80.797430°W
- Status: Defunct
- Attendance: 30,000 - 50,000 (peak)

Tropical Wonderland (previously Florida Wonderland) was an amusement park in Titusville, Florida at the intersection of US Highway 1 and Florida State Road 50 that operated from 1959 until 1973. It had numerous animal exhibits including monkeys and an elephant, an old west and Native American village, a train ride, and other attractions. The park was plagued with multiple animal escapes. One escape resulted in the death of the park’s elephant when it was struck by a truck on US 1 in 1966.

== Name Change ==
The park changed its name from Florida Wonderland to Tropical Wonderland in 1971 when it received an endorsement from Johnny Weissmuller, the movie actor who played Tarzan. This began a three-year period where the park saw renewed interest before the park closed among a cloud of animal mistreatment, unpaid bills, and the loss of the endorsement of Weissmuller. The last owner of the attraction was a Titusville developer, Ben Whitehorse.
