= A. Max Brewer Bridge =

Concrete bridge in Florida, United States

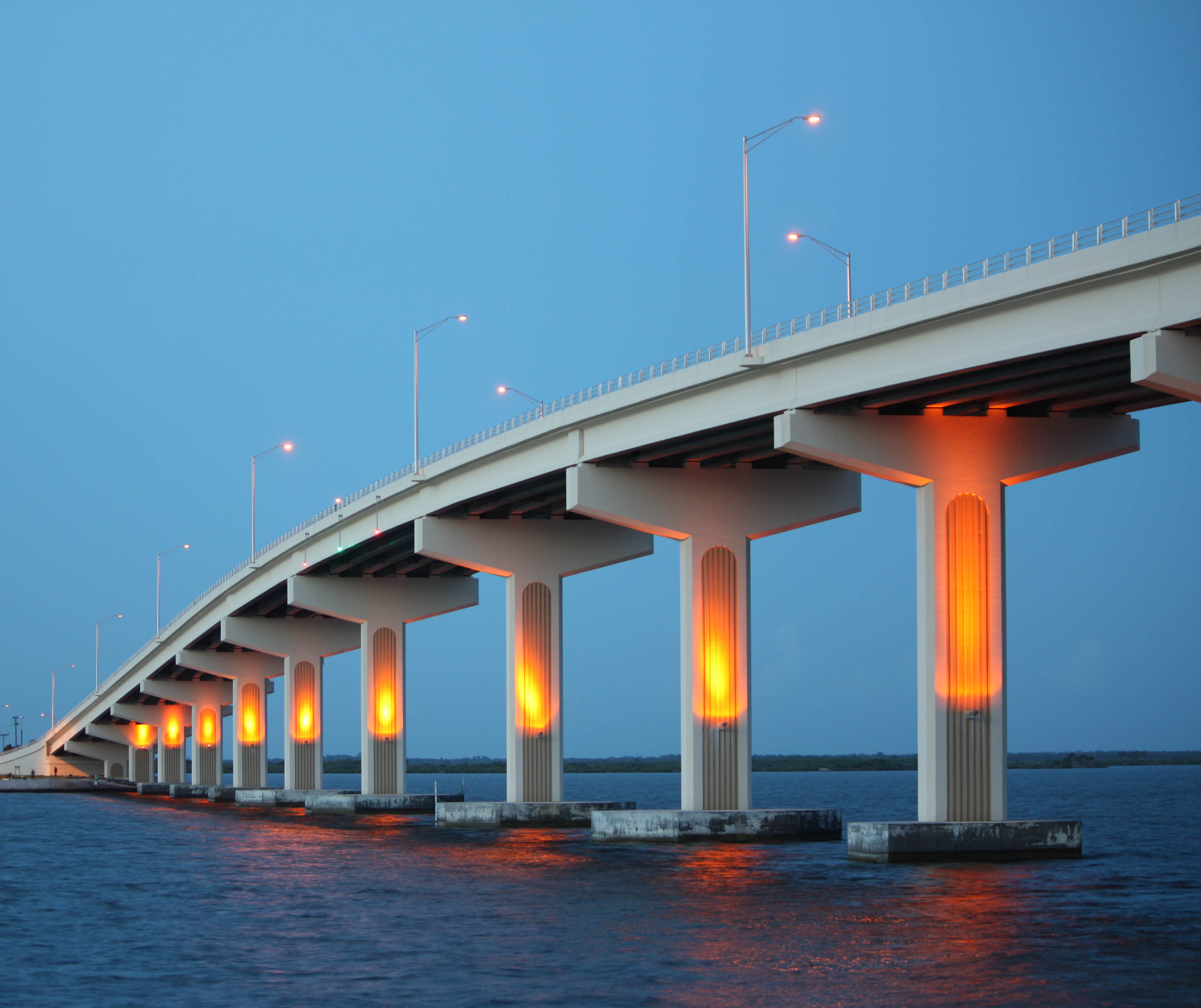
- The A. Max Brewer Bridge in 2013.
- Coordinates: 28.6203°N 80.7985°W
- Carries: CR 402
- Crosses: Indian River
- Locale: Titusville, Florida

Characteristics
- Design: Girder
- Material: Prestressed concrete
- Total length: 3,207 feet
- Width: 50 feet

History
- Opened: 1949 (original bridge); 2011 (current bridge)

Location
- Interactive map of A. Max Brewer Bridge

A. Max Brewer Bridge is a girder bridge in Titusville, Florida. The bridge cost $44.8 million to build and is named in honor of Albert “Max” Brewer, a Titusville attorney in the 1950s who was killed in a private plane crash in 1966. The bridge was selected for the People’s Choice Award, an award presented by the American Association of State Highway and Transportation Officials.

== Reconstruction ==
The bridge was constructed due to the poor condition of the existing bridge, which posed a risk of collapse. The high-level fixed bridge was built over the low-level and short original bridge.
