= Arthur Dunn Airpark =

Coordinates: 28°37′21.186″N 080°50′07.47″W

- IATA: none; ICAO: none; FAA LID: X21

Summary
- Airport type: Public use
- Owner: Titusville Cocoa Airport Authority
- Operator: Michael Powell
- Serves: Titusville, Florida
- Location: Brevard County, Florida
- Elevation AMSL: 30 ft (9.1 m)
- Website: http://www.flairport.com/arthurbody.htm
- Interactive map of Arthur Dunn Airpark

Runways
Direction	Length		Surface
Direction	ft	m	Surface
04U/22U	1,805	550	Turf
15/33	2,961	903	Asphalt

Statistics (1999)
- Aircraft operations: 40,470
- Based aircraft: 79
- Source: Federal Aviation Administration

Arthur Dunn Airpark (FAA LID: X21) is a public-use airport located 2 miles (3.2 km) northwest of the central business district of the city of Titusville in Brevard County, Florida, United States. The airport is publicly owned and is administered under the cognizance of the Titusville-Cocoa Airport Authority. The airport has one paved runway that is 2,961 feet in length and a turf runway that is 1,805 feet in length.

In addition to general aviation activity, a skydiving operator is also located on the field.

== History ==
Historical research indicates that the Arthur Dunn Airpark came into existence as a county airport in late 1927. Three local families leased a total of approximately 45 acres to Brevard County, to be used as an aircraft landing field in conjunction with the 40-acre emergency landing field already in use. These leases remained in effect until 1947, at which time these properties were sold in fee to Brevard County. The county operated the airpark primarily as a base for its mosquito control organizations until March 1966.

During the initial term of the 45-acre lease, Arthur Dunn, a prominent Brevard County Commissioner, supported the acquisition of an additional 40-acre tract located north of the 40-acre airmail emergency landing field. These two parcels, along with the 45-acre parcels purchased from the three local families, became Arthur Dunn Airpark as it exists today.

In December 1939, the Arthur Dunn Airpark was leased to the U.S. Government for use as an auxiliary outlying field (OLF) for U.S. Navy pilots operating out of Naval Air Station Sanford and OLF Titusville, now known as Space Coast Regional Airport. In 1945, the field returned to civilian use and control.

When the county originally acquired the airpark, the property consisted of a two-runway layout. Both runways were grass and were aligned in east–west and northeast–southwest orientations.

In December 1965, the Brevard County Flying Posse, Inc., a non-profit corporation whose membership consisted primarily of aircraft owners and pilots, entered into a ten-year lease with the Brevard Board of County Commissioners to use a portion of the airpark primarily for aircraft hangars and tie-downs. Prior to this lease, most of the Flying Posse members had constructed hangars on the leased premises. During the Flying Posse's lease of the airpark, runway 15/33 was constructed. This runway was paved with a bituminous asphalt material, at a length of 3,000 feet and a width of 50 feet. At the same time, a parallel taxiway, connectors, the FBO ramp, and most other paved areas on the airpark were also constructed at a cost of $3,000. This is the same system that exists today.

During their leasehold (1965–1975), the Flying Posse reportedly was the prime factor in keeping Arthur Dunn Airpark operational. Shortly after the Flying Posse's lease ended, the county transferred ownership of Arthur Dunn to the Titusville-Cocoa Airport District. This transfer occurred on March 10, 1966.

On December 15, 1967, a three-party operations agreement was executed between the Titusville-Cocoa Airport District, the Brevard County Flying Posse, Inc., and Dunn's Flying Service. The essence of this agreement was for Dunn's Flying Service to be able to operate the Radio Aeronautical Advisory Service under the FCC license of the Flying Posse to provide aeronautical advisory to local pilots (UNICOM service). The term of this operations agreement was set at eight years, so as to expire at the same time that the Flying Posse land lease expired in 1975. Prior to and during the term of the Flying Posse's lease, all of the wooden hangars that exist today, including "The Posse Shack", were constructed by Flying Posse members. Those structures became the property of the airpark at the expiration of the Flying Posse lease.

The current FBO building was constructed in the early 1960s and was operated by Taylor Dunn, son of Arthur Dunn. In 1964, an additional 1,850 square yards of apron pavement was placed adjacent to the original apron to create the apron as it exists today. The current FBO operation is conducted by Walkwitz Aviation, Inc.

== See also ==
- List of airports in Florida
- Taylor-Dunn House
