= Space Coast Regional Airport =

Airport in Florida, United States of America

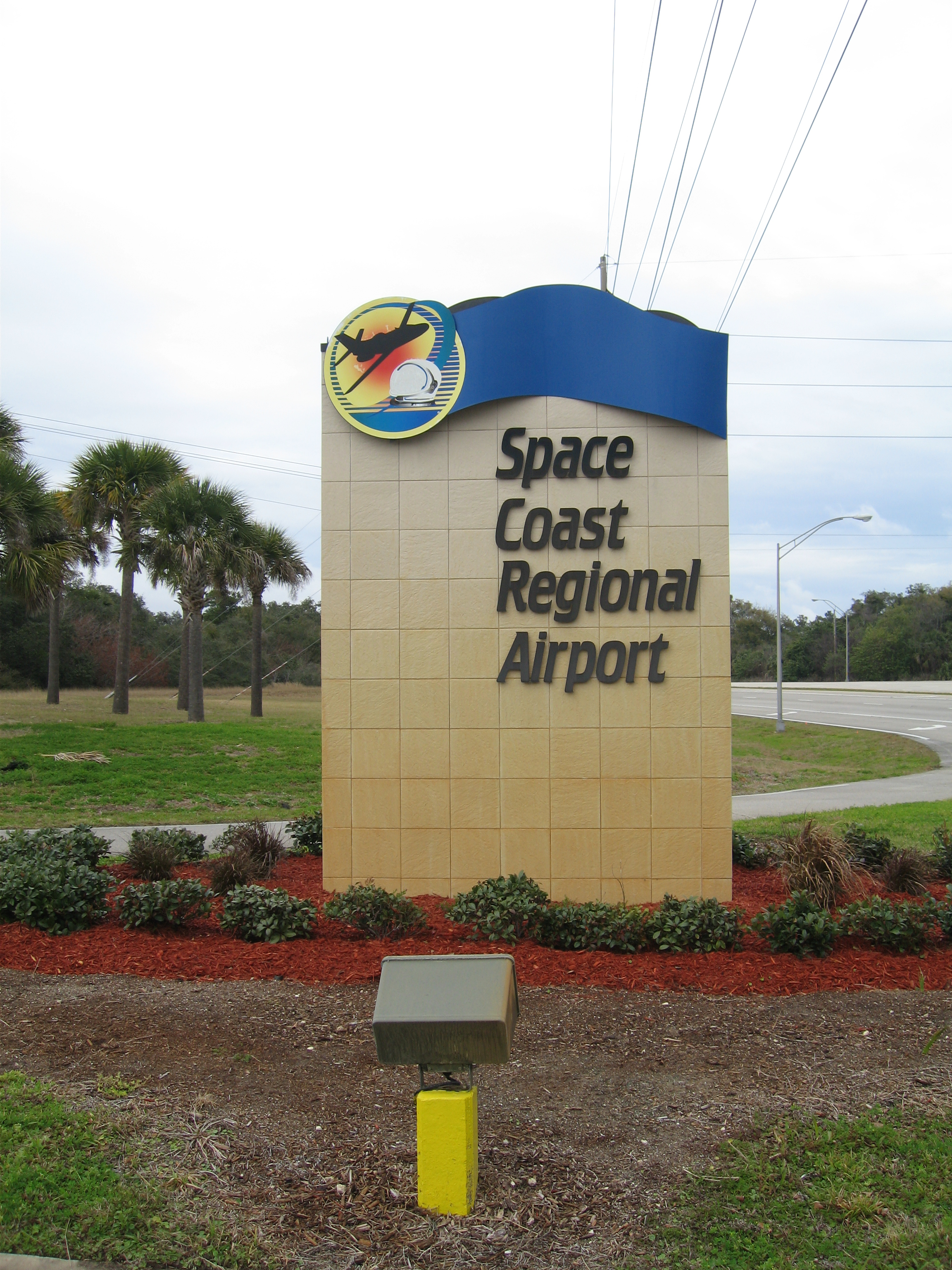
- IATA: TIX; ICAO: KTIX; FAA LID: TIX

Summary
- Airport type: Public
- Owner: Titusville-Cocoa Airport Authority
- Location: Titusville, Florida
- Elevation AMSL: 34 ft / 10.4 m
- Coordinates: 28°30′53.28″N 80°47′57.22″W

Map
- Location of airport in Florida TIX (the United States)

Runways
Direction	Length		Surface
Direction	ft	m	Surface
18/36	7,319	2,231	Asphalt
9/27	5,000	1,524	Asphalt

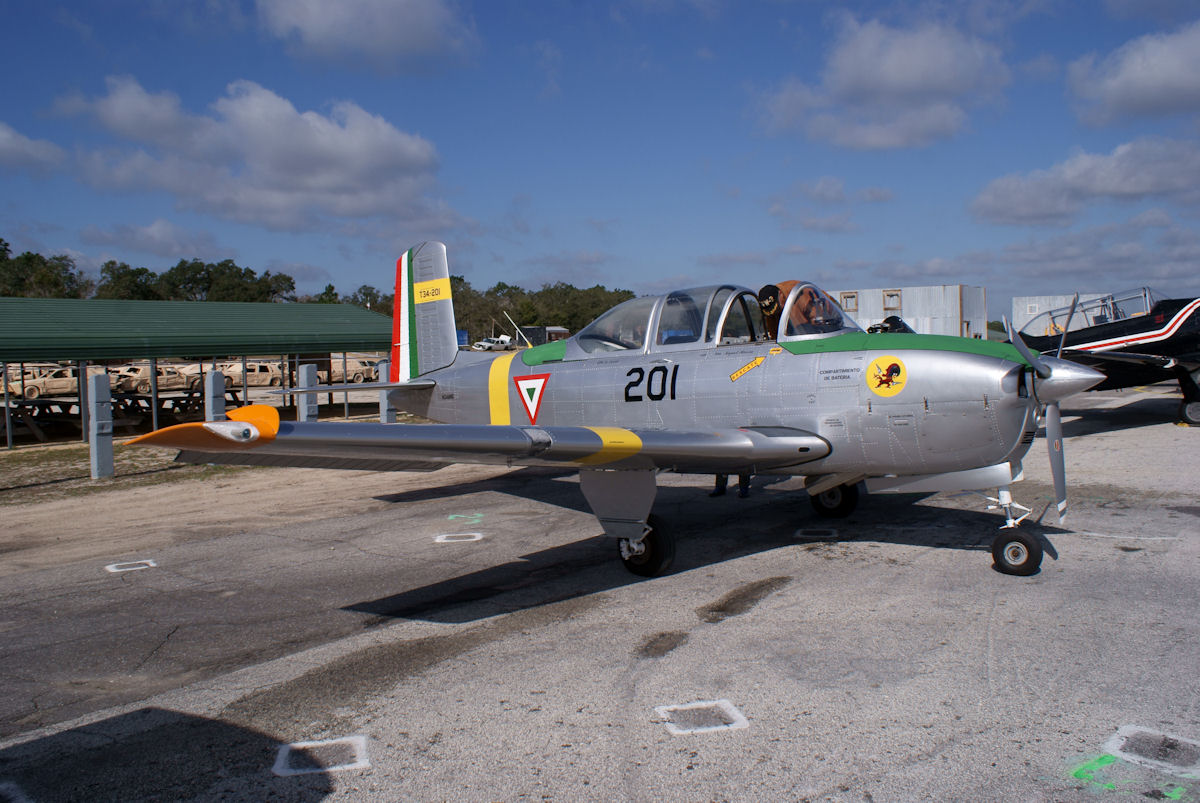
Mexican Air Force Beechcraft T-34A Mentor (201) during TICO Airshow 2010

Space Coast Regional Airport (IATA: TIX, ICAO: KTIX, FAA LID: TIX) is in Titusville, Florida, United States, on Columbia Boulevard (State Road 405) and Washington Avenue (U.S. 1) in Brevard County. Formerly known, and still colloquially referred to, as Ti-Co (Titusville-Cocoa) Airport, it is the nearest commercial airport to the Kennedy Space Center.

== History ==
In 1943 the U.S. Government built the airport on land jointly owned by both cities, Titusville and Cocoa. The airfield had two 5,000 feet (1,500 m) x 150 feet (46 m) runways with a taxiway system. The U.S. Government developed the airport to serve as an outlying field (OLF) to Naval Air Station Sanford during World War II. The airport was built by the Civil Aeronautics Administration under the "Development of Landing Areas for National Defense" Program to help relieve other area military bases of training exercises during World War II. The government retained control of the airport for the duration of the war.

After the war the U.S. Navy transferred the airport and associated improvements to the War Assets Administration, which deeded the airport back to the Cities of Titusville and Cocoa by a Surrender of Lease and Quit Claim Deed dated April 18, 1947.

The taxiways and runways of the Titusville-Cocoa Airport hosted a NASCAR Grand National (now Cup Series) event, on December 30, 1956, for the 1957 NASCAR season. Fireball Roberts won in a Peter DePaolo Ford.

An airport authority was established by the Cities of Titusville and Cocoa to own, operate, improve, and maintain the airport. The property was transferred to the authority by Quit Claim Deeds from the City of Titusville on March 14, 1961, and from the City of Cocoa on April 11, 1961.

Having previously used military facilities on nearby Cape Canaveral Air Force Station, the National Aeronautics and Space Administration (NASA) began development of its own civilian staffed launch facilities, in what became the John F. Kennedy Space Center (KSC), on Merritt Island in the early 1960s. The location of this regional airport made it important to the transportation of NASA personnel and equipment.

Eastern Air Lines Boeing 727 and McDonnell Douglas DC-9 jetliners served Titusville with scheduled passenger flights from 1970 to 1974.

== Creation of Airport District ==
The "Titusville-Cocoa Airport District Act of 1963" created the Titusville-Cocoa Airport District and the Titusville-Cocoa Airport Authority ("Authority") to govern the operations of the airport facilities. The Authority was created to service the local, commercial, and corporate aviation needs as well as to stimulate economic growth in the local communities. The Authority replaced the original airport authority established in 1959. This legislation commissioned the Authority to govern the affairs of the Airport District. This currently includes Space Coast Regional Airport, Arthur Dunn Airpark, and Merritt Island Airport.

The 1963 Act established policies for the funding of Authority activities, including an ad valorem tax not to exceed one mil on all taxable properties within the geographical bounds of the District. Also included was the authorization of the District to issue general obligation bonds and revenue bonds to finance the acquisition, construction, or development of airport property or facilities.

== Current Airport Authority ==
The Titusville-Cocoa Airport Authority now has seven members. Two are appointed from Brevard County election Districts I, II, and IV, and one is appointed at-large by the Board of County Commissioners of Brevard County. The Authority exercises hiring and oversight responsibility for the Authority's Executive Director, a full-time civil servant airport executive who has day-to-day responsibility for the operation, maintenance and supervision of Space Coast Regional Airport, Merritt Island Airport, Arthur Dunn Airpark and associated airport staff personnel.

== Facilities ==
Space Coast Regional Airport covers 1,650 acres (668 ha) and has two runways:

- Runway 18/36 7,319 ft × 150 ft (2,231 m × 46 m), surface: asphalt
- Runway 9/27 5,000 ft × 100 ft (1,524 m × 30 m), surface: asphalt

== Warbird Museum ==
The Valiant Air Command is a frequently flyable collection of planes used in World Wars I and II. It is based here, along with a permanent collection of additional aircraft from the Korean War, the Vietnam War, the Cold War and the first Gulf War/Operation Desert Storm at the Valiant Air Command Warbird Museum. The museum provides an exhibit of air history, offering a static display of vintage Warbird aircraft, including a Douglas C-47A. Veteran tour guides recount war stories.

== Events ==
The Tico Air Show (March) is an annual event since 1977 and features modern military and vintage airplane fly-bys and demonstrations, strafing runs, dog fights, vintage warbird static displays, and military exhibits. In 2008, about 30,000 visitors attended.

== Industry ==
Bristow Helicopters' Bristow Academy, a helicopter flying school, employs 160 and training 350 people a year in Schweizer 300CBIs, Robinson R22s, Robinson R44s, and Bell 206Bs. They have 59 helicopters. It is the world's largest civilian helicopter school.

The Zero Gravity Corporation offers weightless flights in its modified Boeing 727 and Airbus A300 cargo planes.

AeroDyne Detail, LLC provides mobile detailing services on the field.

== See also ==
- List of airports in Florida
