= Wager House =

- U.S. National Register of Historic Places
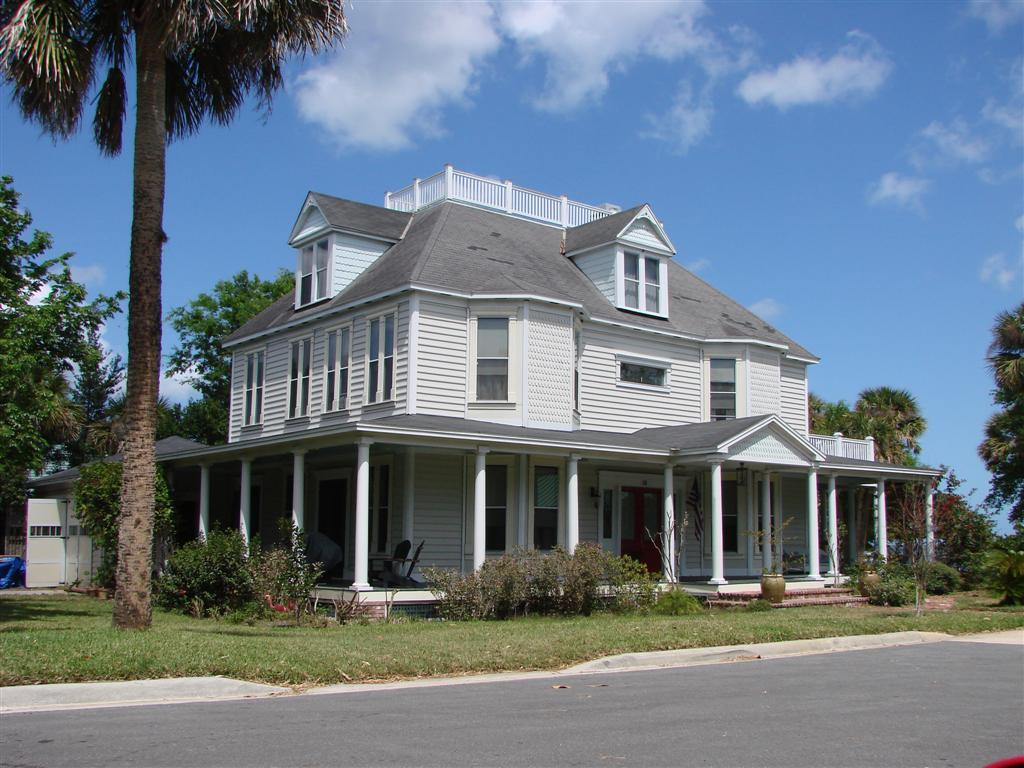

- Location within Florida Location within the United States
- Location: Titusville, Florida
- Coordinates: 28°36′29″N 80°48′23″W
- MPS: Titusville MPS
- NRHP reference No.: 89002165
- Added to NRHP: January 10, 1990

The Wager House is a historic home in Titusville, Florida, United States. It is located at 621 Indian River Avenue. On January 10, 1990, it was added to the U.S. National Register of Historic Places.
