= Spell House (Titusville, Florida) =

- U.S. National Register of Historic Places
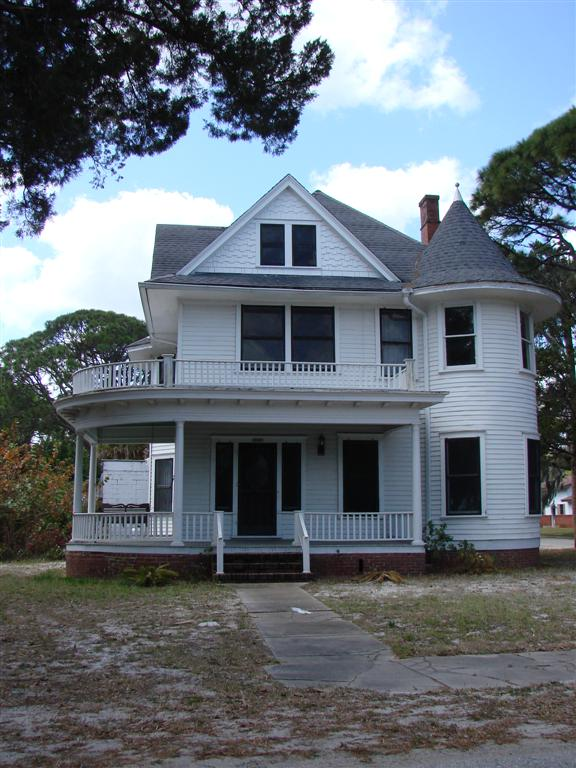

- Location within Florida Location within the United States
- Location: Titusville, Florida
- Coordinates: 28°36′7″N 80°48′22″W
- MPS: Titusville MPS
- NRHP reference No.: 89002166
- Added to NRHP: January 12, 1990

The Spell House is a historic home in Titusville, Florida, United States. It is located at 1200 Riverside Drive. On January 12, 1990, it was added to the U.S. National Register of Historic Places.
