= Pritchard House =

Historic place in Florida, U.S.

- U.S. National Register of Historic Places
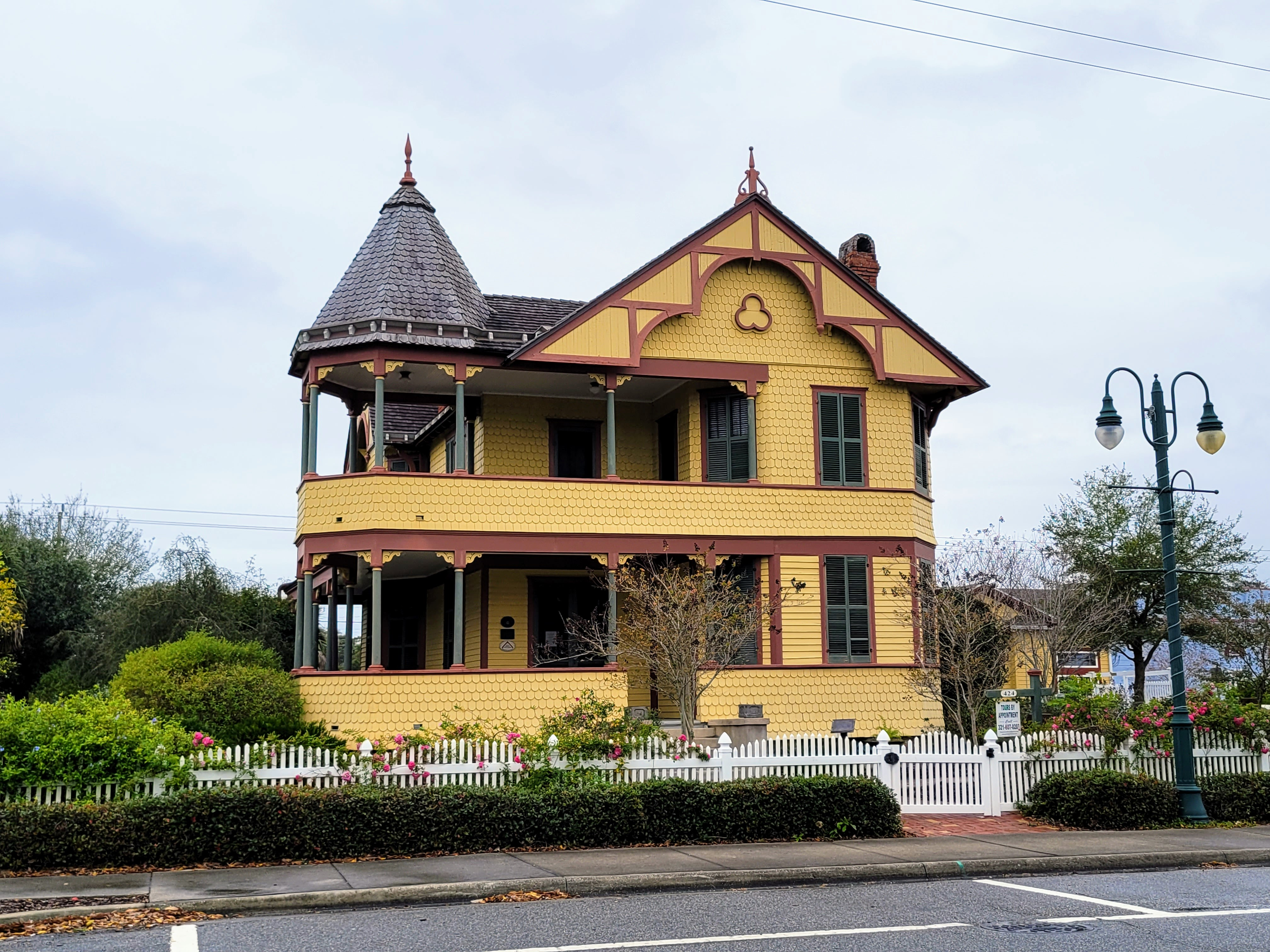
- The Pritchard House February 2022

- Location within Florida Location within the United States
- Interactive map showing the location of Pritchard House
- Location: Titusville, Florida, U.S.
- Coordinates: 28°36′37″N 80°48′28″W
- MPS: Titusville MPS
- NRHP reference No.: 89002167
- Added to NRHP: January 12, 1990

The Pritchard House is a historic house in Titusville, Florida, United States. It is located at 424 South Washington Avenue. On January 12, 1990, it was added to the U.S. National Register of Historic Places. The house is owned by the Brevard County Board of County Commissioners and operated by the North Brevard Heritage Foundation.

== Family History ==
James Pritchard was born in New York City in 1836. He served in the Army of Missouri of the Confederate forces and met his wife Mary Haley Boye in December 1866. After inheriting land from Joseph Delespine, Mary's grandfather, the couple and their three children moved to Florida in 1876 and settled in an area near what "became Indian River City but was then known as Pritchard's Landing". After initially growing sugarcane and citrus, Captain Pritchard became involved in the real estate business. In 1888, Pritchard organized the Indian River State bank and served as its president. In 1891, contractor Pleasant J. Hall began building the Pritchard's new home located on Washington Avenue. Captain Pritchard, his wife Mary, his mother-in-law Frances Delespine Boye, and his children Boud and Kate were the original occupants. Captain Pritchard died in 1926 and is buried at Oaklawn Cemetery in Titusville, Florida. Boud and his wife, Lola Pauline Smith, known as "Miss Lovie" lived in the house until their deaths. Boud and Miss Lovie's daughter Mary lived in house until 2005, when the house was purchased by Brevard County Board of County Commissioners.

== Architecture ==
The Pritchard House is a two-story wood-framed Queen Anne style residence located near downtown Titusville. It is surrounded by a white picket fence and is situated between two major thoroughfares. According to the original paperwork submitted to the National Park Service for the inclusion on the National Register of Historic Places:

The main block of the house is gable front with a slope front gable wing on the south elevation. Exterior walls imbricated with wood fishscale shingles. Outstanding features on the main block include decorative ogee shaped bargeboard with incised scrollwork and drop pendants. The side gable contains round arched bargeboard of similar design. A conical tower at the southeast corner complements a canted, two story porch. The porch wraps the east and west elevations and is supported by small Tuscan columns with scroll brackets. The front gabled bay is canted. Three large brick chimneys with corbelled caps and hoods are located on the north and south lateral slopes of the roof and the west ridge. The house rests on a brick pier foundation. A rear porch addition does not significantly affect the integrity of the structure. In the late nineteenth century, prominent citizens built Queen Anne-style homes along the South Washington Avenue and North Indian River Avenue corridors. The Pritchard House is the last remaining Queen Anne residence on South Washington Avenue.

== Restoration ==
In 2003, the owner of the home, Mary Pritchard Schuster sent a letter of intent to District 1 County Commissioner Truman Scarborough offering to sell the home to Brevard County. The house was to be restored in its original location and used as a Living History House Museum. No portion of the land could be sold, a member of the Pritchard family must be included in the organization that operates the museum and if the house ever ceases to operate as a house museum, ownership will revert to the Pritchard family. The county purchased the home and property for $250,000. After Brevard County took ownership of the Pritchard House in 2005, restoration began immediately. Brevard County spent approximately $50,000 fixing the home before leasing it to the North Brevard Heritage Foundation. The North Brevard Heritage Foundation continued to renovate the home and planned to operate it as a museum. The house needed several repairs when Brevard County took possession of it. The foundation needed to be stabilized with concrete footings and hurricane-resistant straps. The porch required a return to historical accuracy. The home's interior needed to be restored as well, including furniture restoration, wallpapering, painting, and flooring. An archeological dig began in 2005 by the Indian River Anthropological Society. Some treasures that were found included an ink bottle, perfume bottle, square nails, ceramic pieces, and children's marbles.

== Historical Marker ==
The North Brevard Heritage Foundation unveiled a state historic marker in December 2005. The marker reads:

Captain James Pritchard bought a lot from Mary Titus, and in the spring of 1891 contracted Pleasant J. Hall, who had built St. Gabriel's Episcopal Church, to build a Queen Anne style house of heart pine. It appears today much like it did then. On the first floor is a main entrance hall, a stairway to the second floor, parlor and dining room. The kitchen was separated from the main living area by an open passage, now closed in with a side door. A narrow stairway ascends from the kitchen to the maid's room above. The second floor has four bedrooms with built-in closets. Only the master bedroom had access to the balcony. The passage between the main house and maid's room at the end of the hall later became a bathroom. A pipe connected to a hand pump located next to the tub carried water from the cistern below. The four fireplaces have original tiled hearths. The entrance hall light fixture is original. In 1888, Pritchard organized Titusville's first bank, built the first generating plant in 1890-later sold to Florida Power and Light Co., and owned James Pritchard and Son Hardware Store. Pritchard family members had continuously lived in the house, until it was purchased by Brevard County in May 2005.

== Tourist Attraction ==
The Pritchard House opened to the public in December 2010. Tours are available strictly by reservation-only. The house can be reserved for weddings, meetings, and private functions. Special public events take place throughout the year including civil war reenactments, exclusive seating for the Titusville Holiday parade, and parties.

== Gallery ==
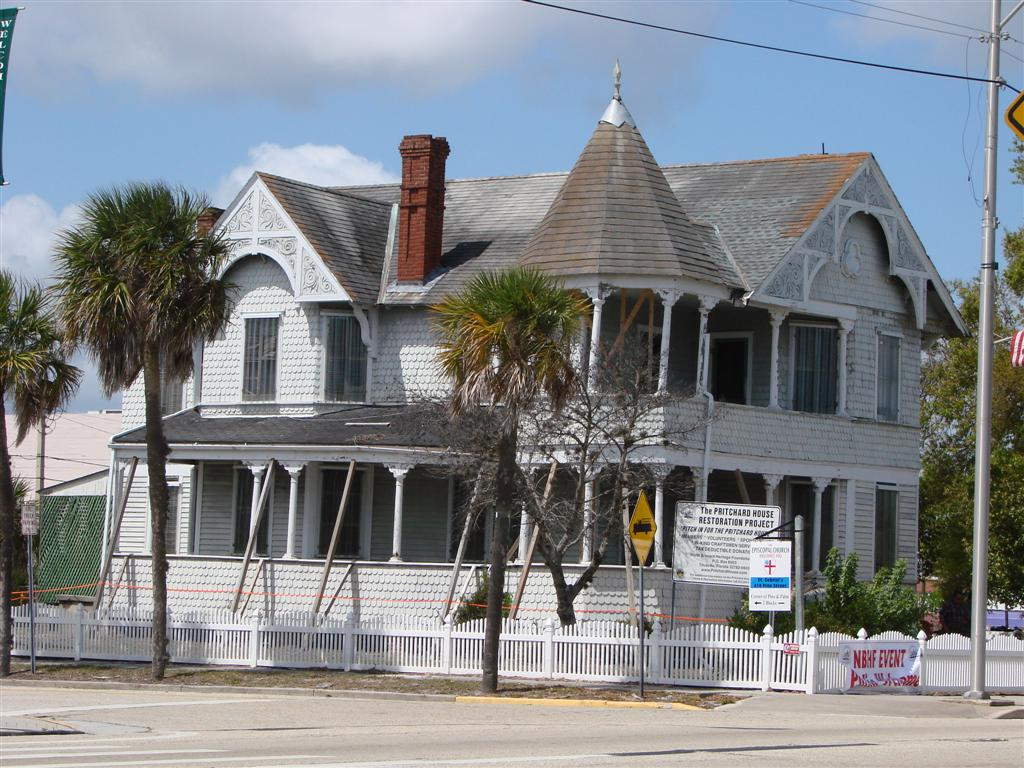
Pritchard House in 2007

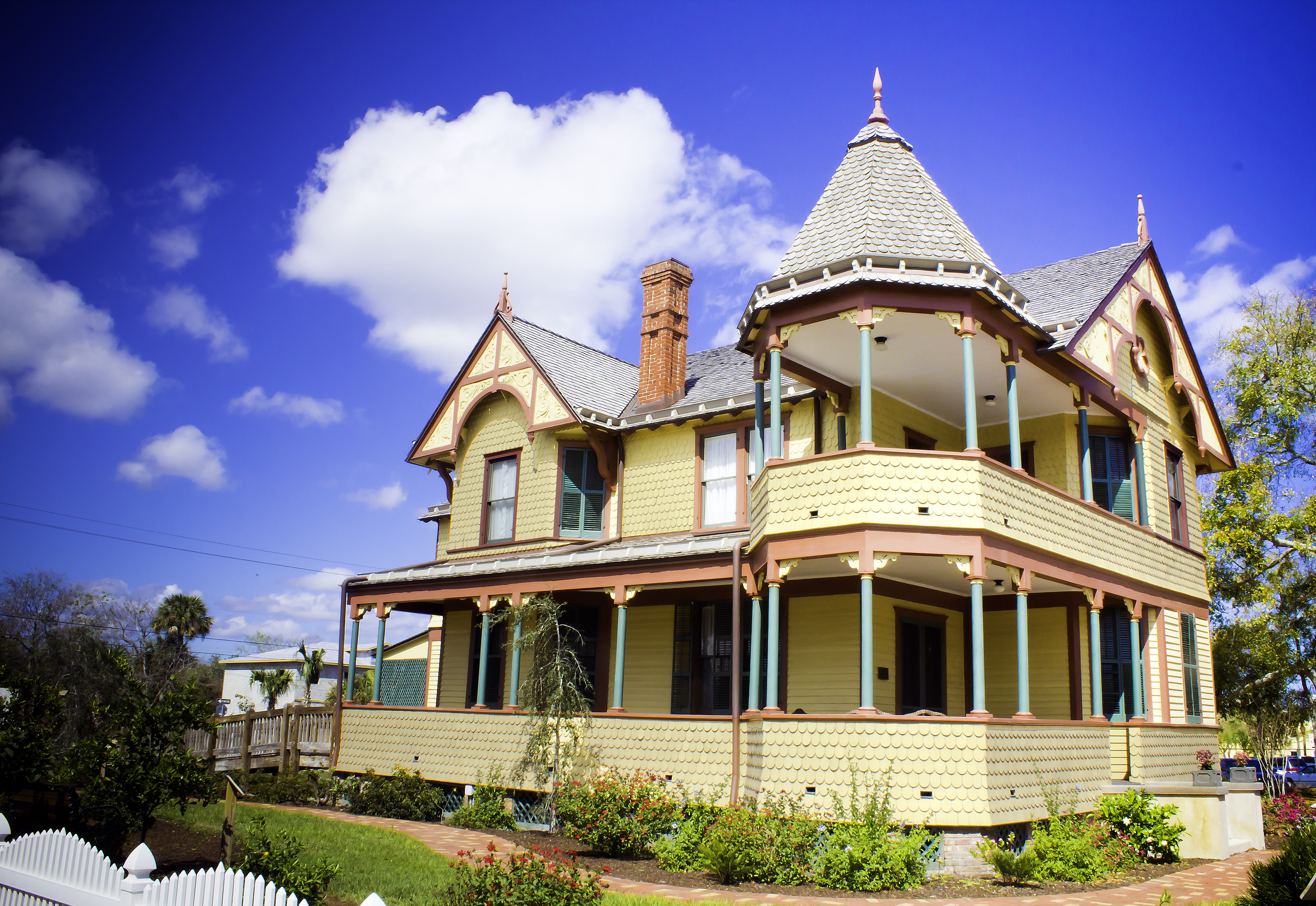
The Historic Pritchard House in 2012
