= St. Gabriel's Episcopal Church (Titusville, Florida) =

Historic church in Florida, United States

- U.S. National Register of Historic Places
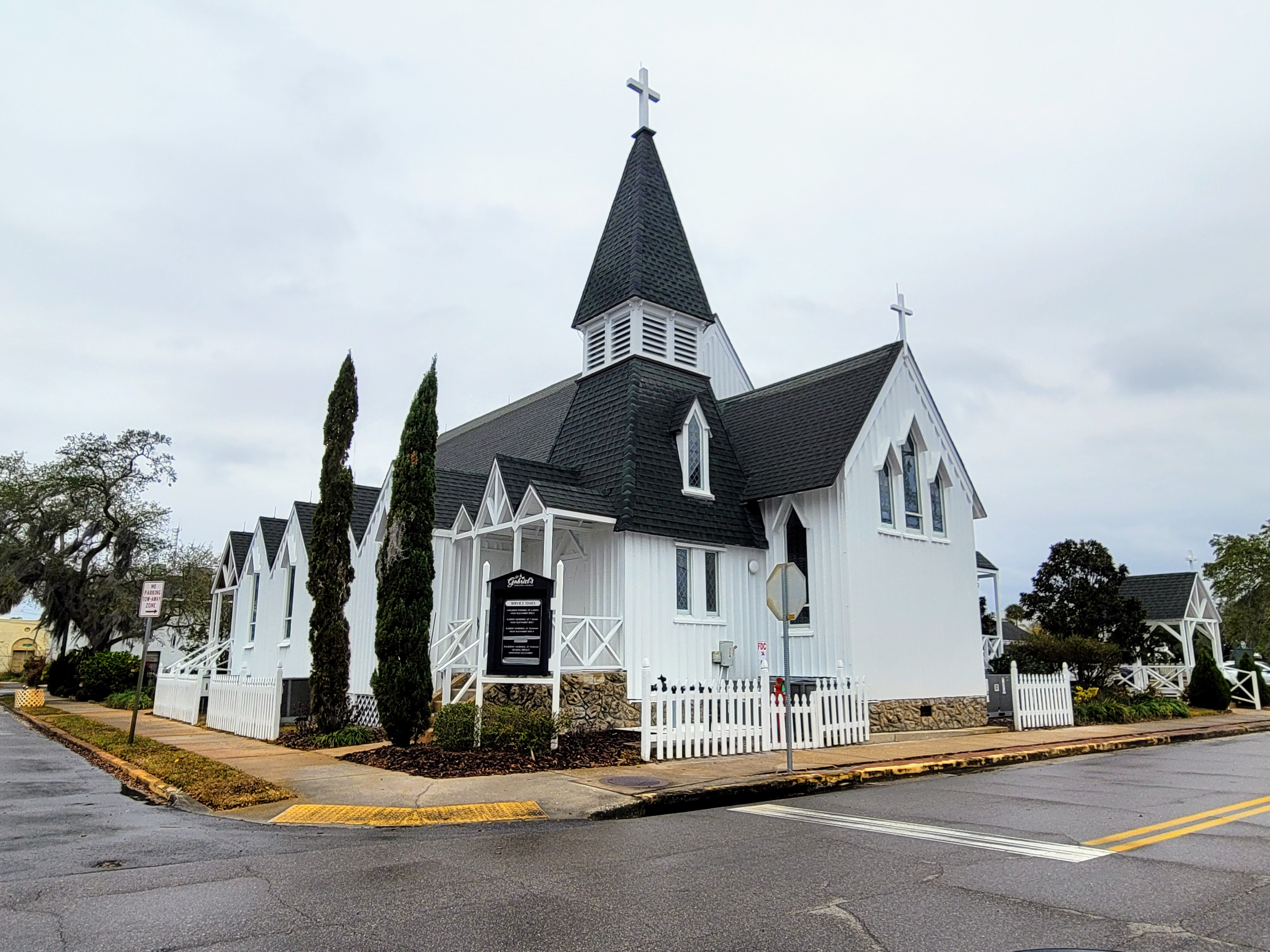
- February 2022

- Location within Florida Location within the United States
- Location: 414 Pine St., Titusville, Florida
- Coordinates: 28°36′28″N 80°48′39″W
- Area: less than one acre
- Built: 1888
- Architectural style: Bishop Weed Gothic (Carpenter Gothic)
- NRHP reference No.: 72000302
- Added to NRHP: December 5, 1972

St. Gabriel's Episcopal Church is a historic Carpenter Gothic church in Titusville, Florida, United States. The church was built in 1888 on donated land and is located at 414 Pine Street. On December 5, 1972, it was added to the U.S. National Register of Historic Places. It is part of the Episcopal Diocese of Central Florida

== Gallery ==
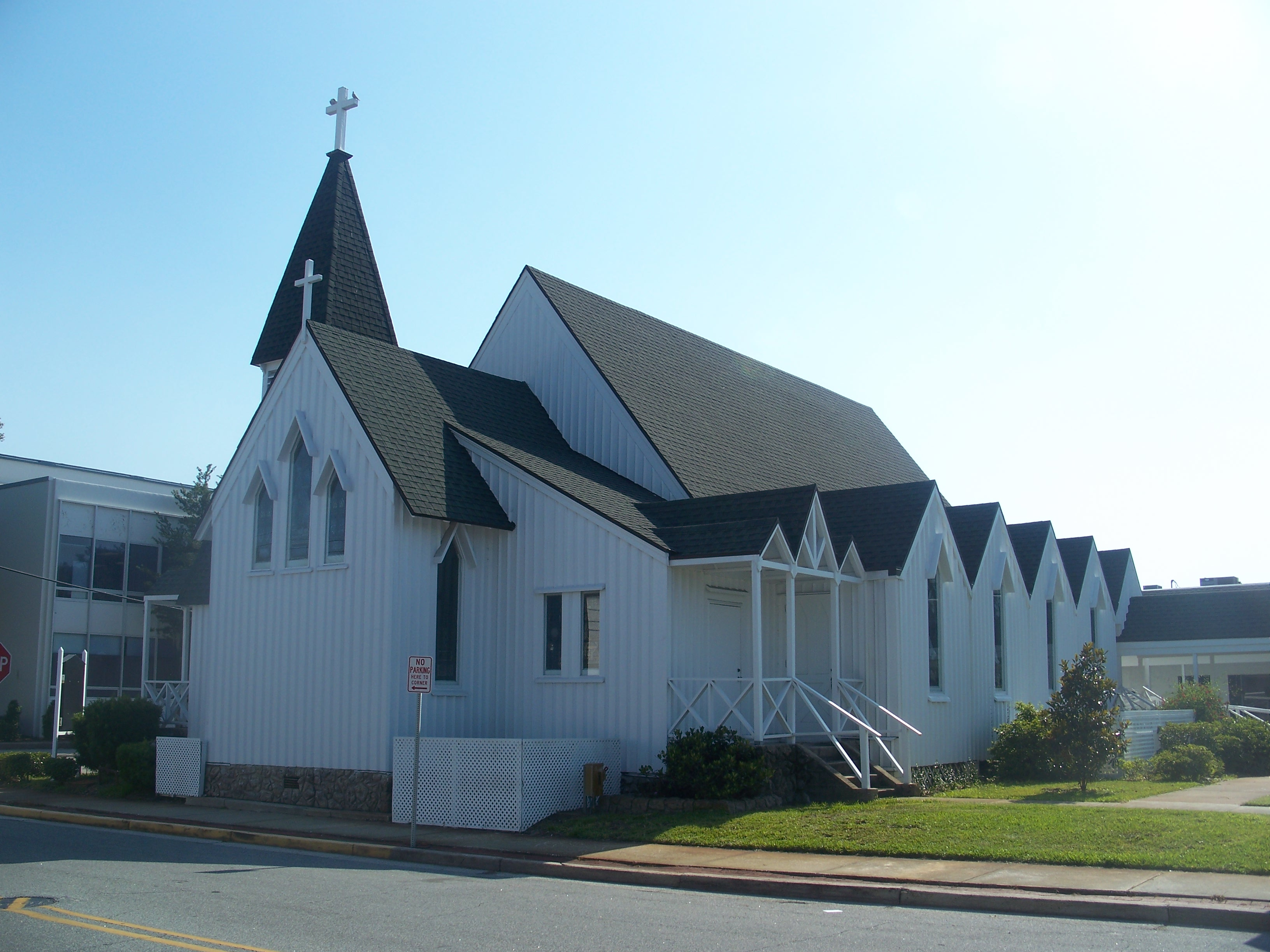

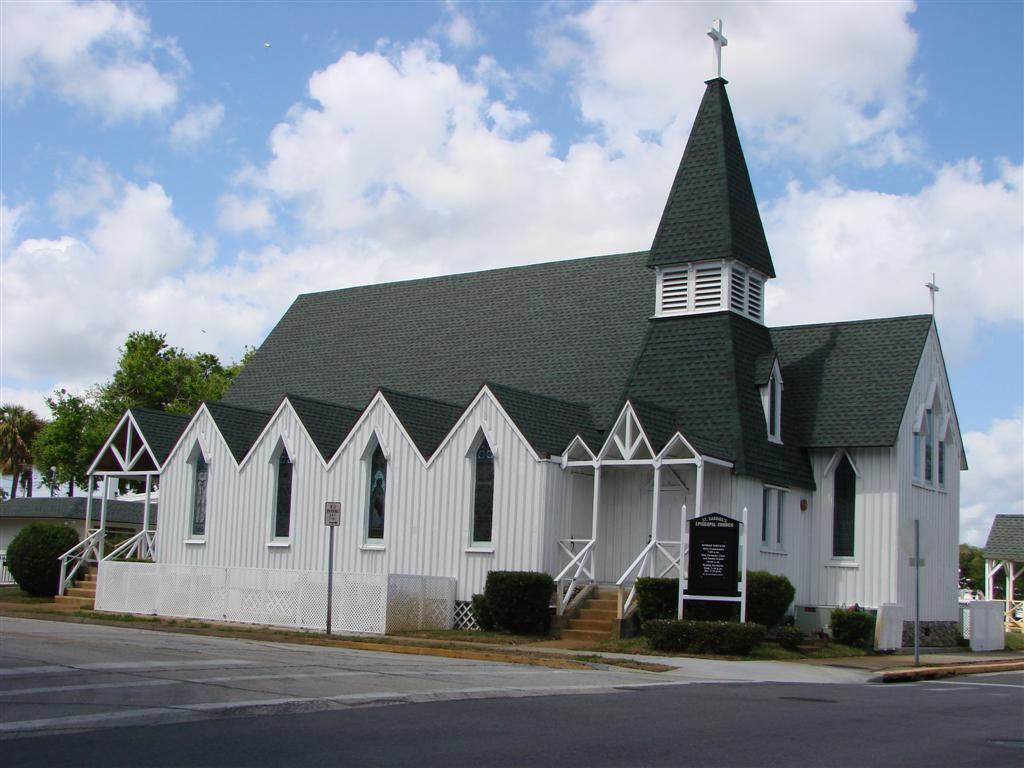
March 2007
