= A. Max Brewer =

American politician

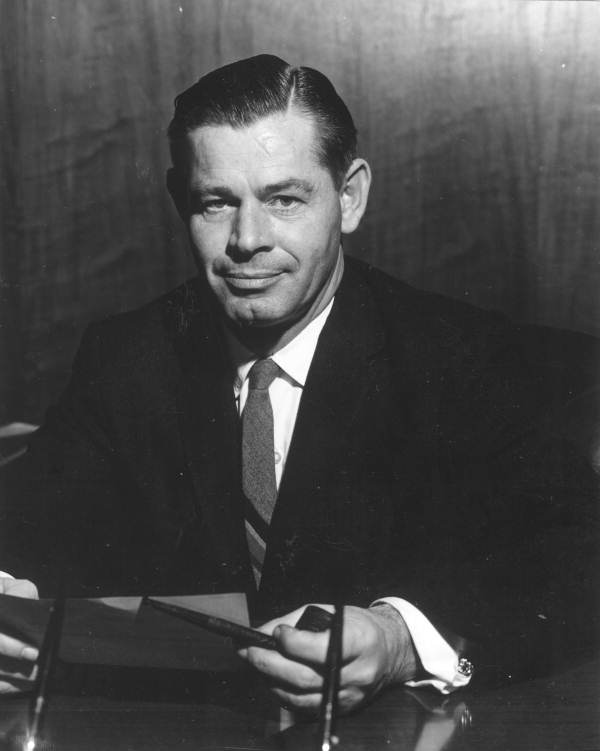
- Brewer in 1961

Member of the Florida House of Representatives from Brevard County
- In office 1953–1956

Personal details
- Born: June 10, 1923
- Died: February 1966 (aged 41)
- Party: Democratic

A. Max Brewer (June 10, 1923 – February 1966) was an American politician. He served as a Democratic member of the Florida House of Representatives.
