= Titusville Negro School =

School in Titusville, Florida (1915–1968)

Coordinates: 28.6068°N 80.8140°W

Titusville Negro School was a school for African Americans in Titusville, Florida. In 1915, the old wooden Titusville High School building was donated and relocated for use as the school's building. It burned in 1931. In the late 1930s high school grades were added. It was succeeded by the Andrew J. Gibson School in 1956. That school closed in 1968 with desegregation.

Harry Tyson Moore was its principal from 1927 until 1936. Clarence W. Harris served as principal from 1940 until 1943.
