= Judge George Robbins House =

- U.S. National Register of Historic Places
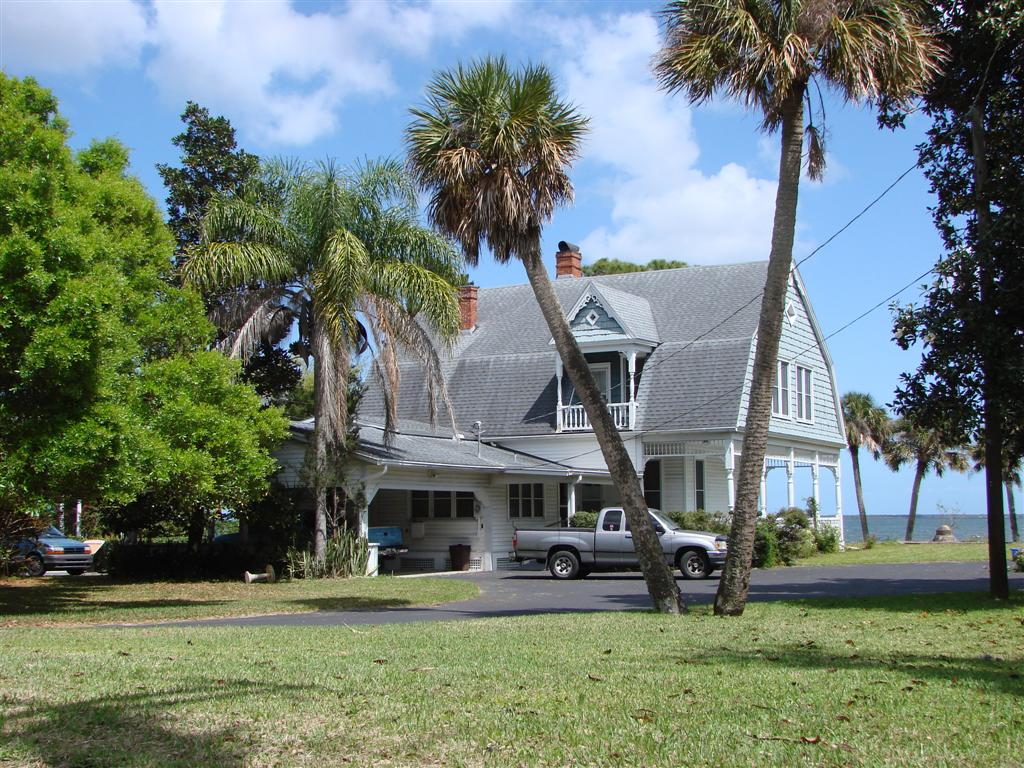

- Location within Florida Location within the United States
- Location: Titusville, Florida
- Coordinates: 28°36′27″N 80°48′23″W
- MPS: Titusville MPS
- NRHP reference No.: 89002168
- Added to NRHP: January 12, 1990

The Judge George Robbins House is a historic home in Titusville, Florida, United States. It is located at 703 Indian River Avenue. The house is the only remaining example of the Dutch Colonial Revival style in Titusville.

Robbins purchased the lot in 1891 for $1500 and an adjoining lot a year later. However, construction on the house only began in October 1900. It was completed in early March 1901.

On January 12, 1990, the house was added to the U.S. National Register of Historic Places.

The house was owned by Diantha and Clyde Pirtle for approximately 25 years.
