= Titusville Commercial District =

Historic district in Florida, United States

- U.S. National Register of Historic Places
- U.S. Historic district
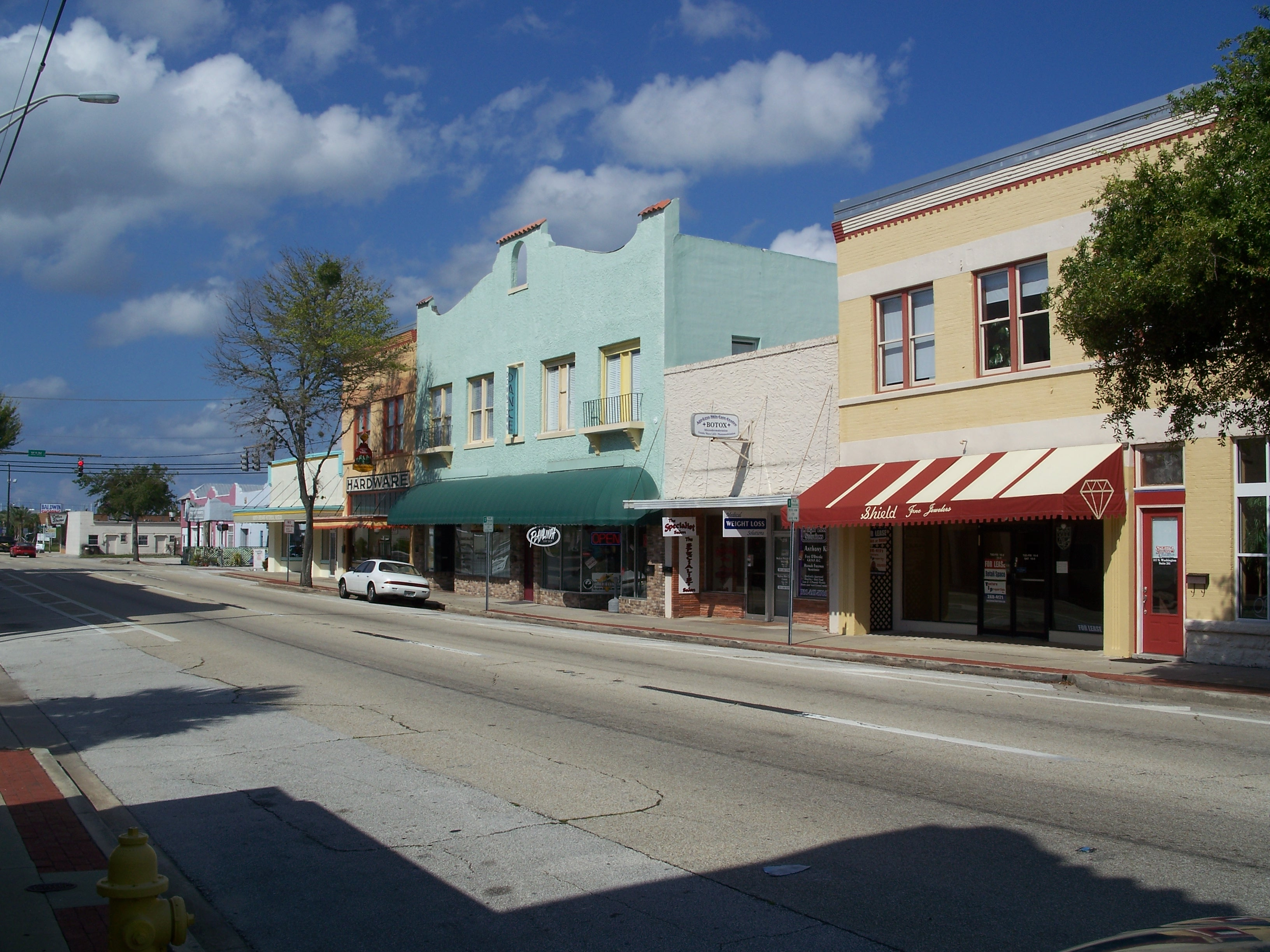

- Location within Florida Location within the United States
- Location: Titusville, Florida
- Coordinates: 28°36′43.09″N 80°48′25.34″W
- Area: 60 acres (24 ha)
- MPS: Titusville MPS
- NRHP reference No.: 89002164
- Added to NRHP: January 10, 1990

The Titusville Commercial District (also known as Downtown Titusville Historic District) is a U.S. historic district in Titusville, Florida. It is bounded by Julia Street, Hopkins Avenue, Main Street, and Indian River Avenue, encompasses approximately 60 acres (240,000 m^{2}), and contains 21 historic buildings. On January 10, 1990, it was added to the U.S. National Register of Historic Places. It is currently debatable whether or not it is Titusville's main commercial district anymore, as an area in south Titusville near the intersection of SR 50 (FL) and State Road 405 (Florida) close to I-95 (FL) has much more major shopping and dining than Downtown Titusville.
