= Titusville, Florida =

- City
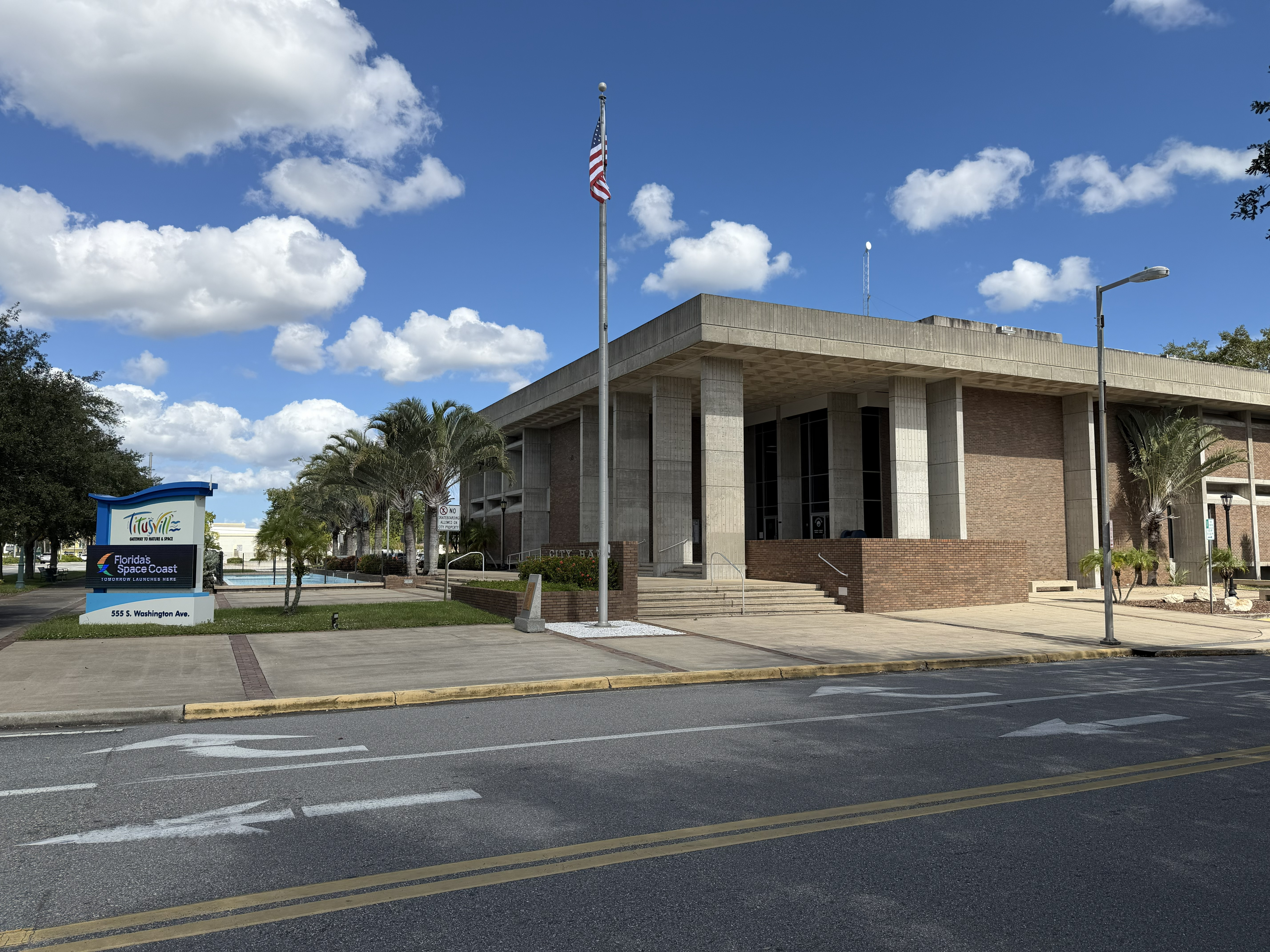
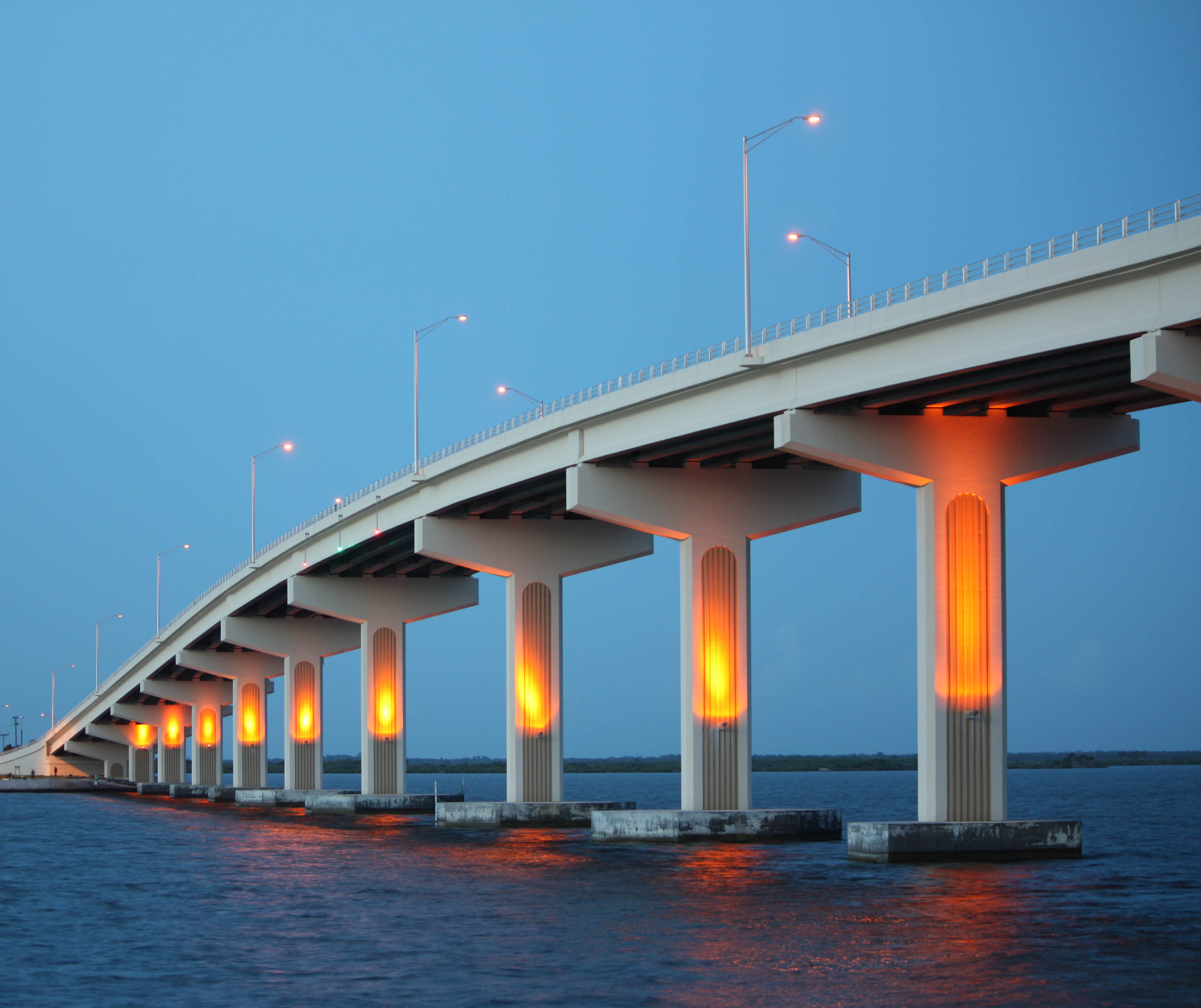
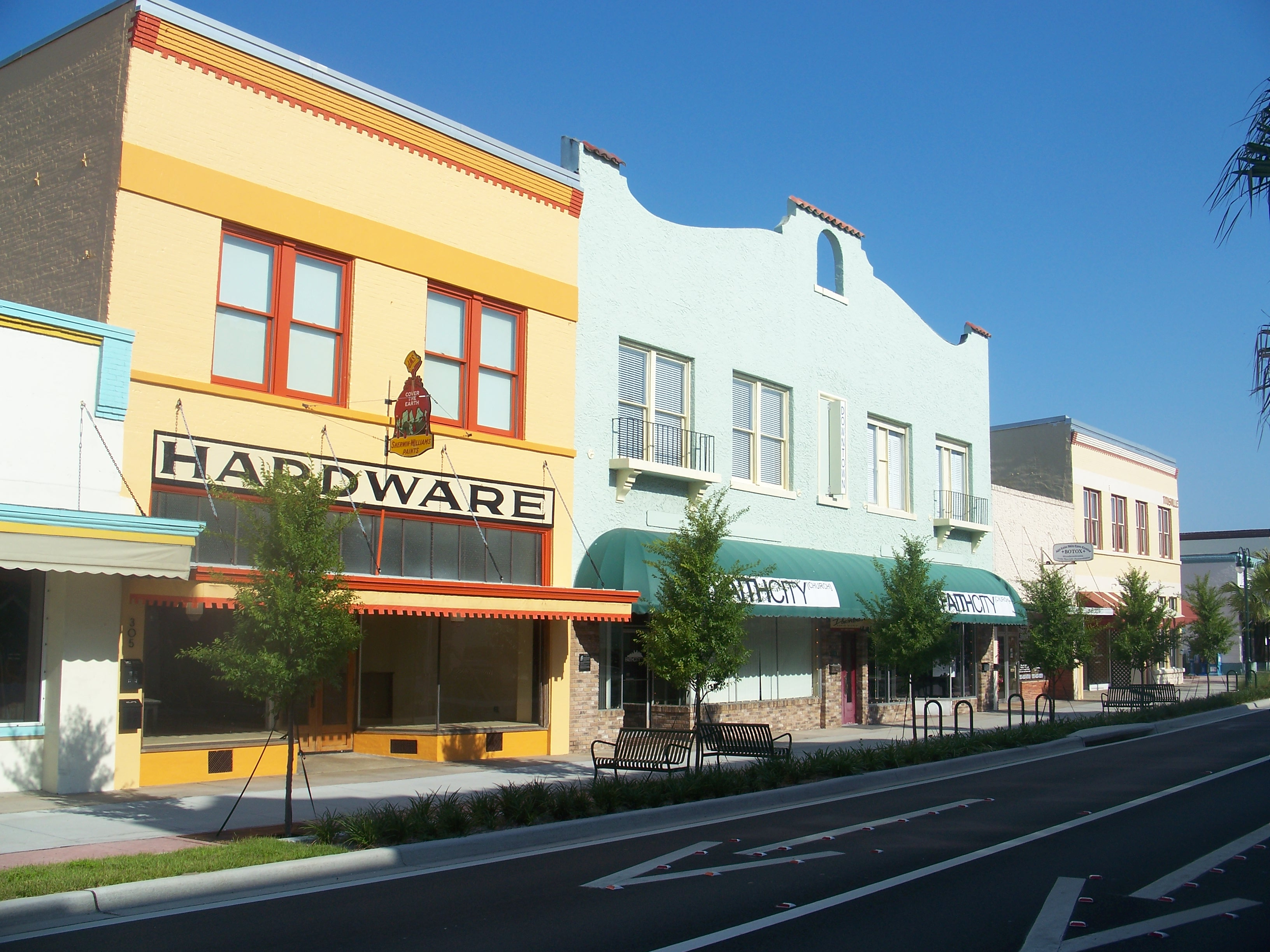
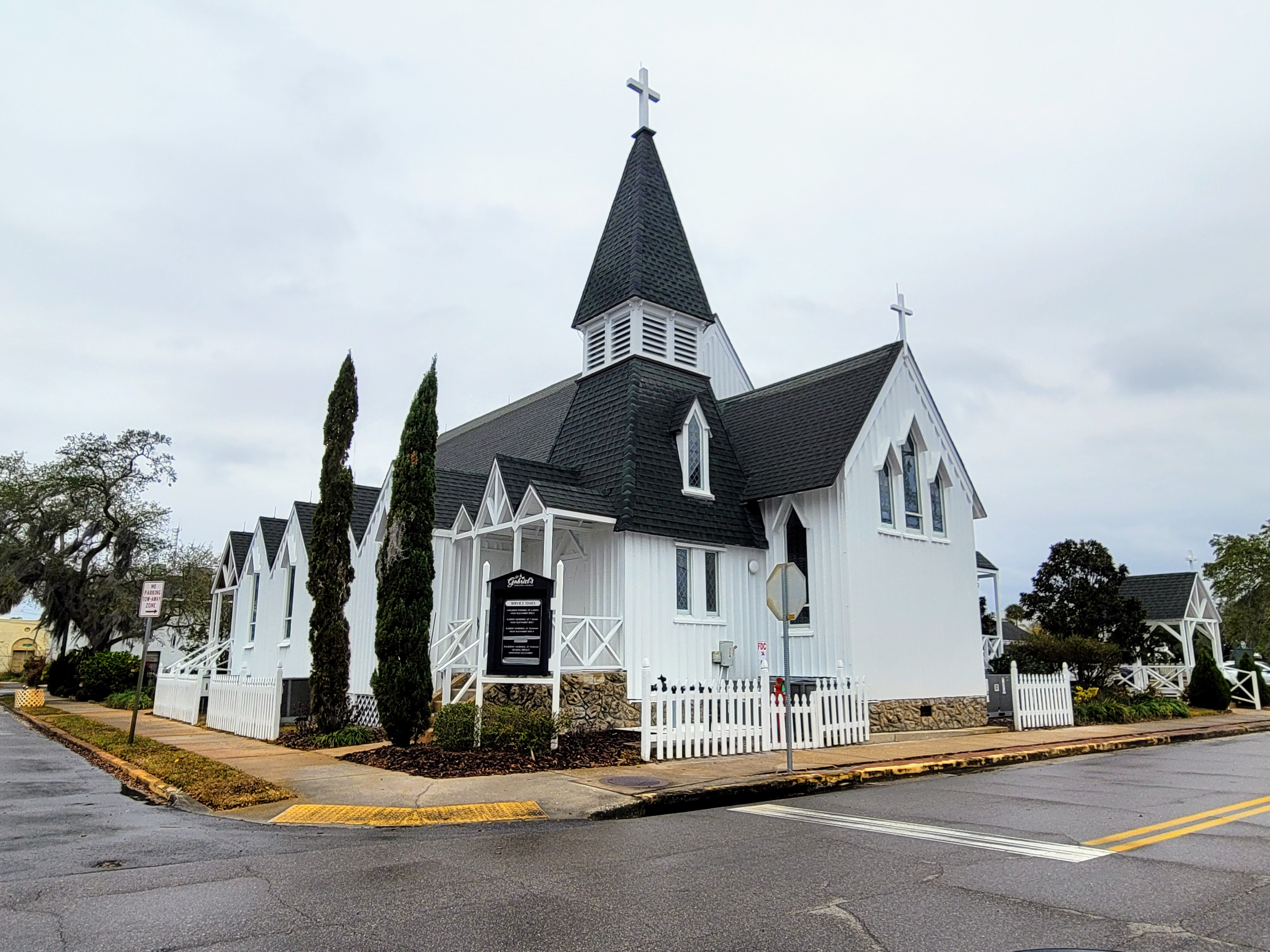
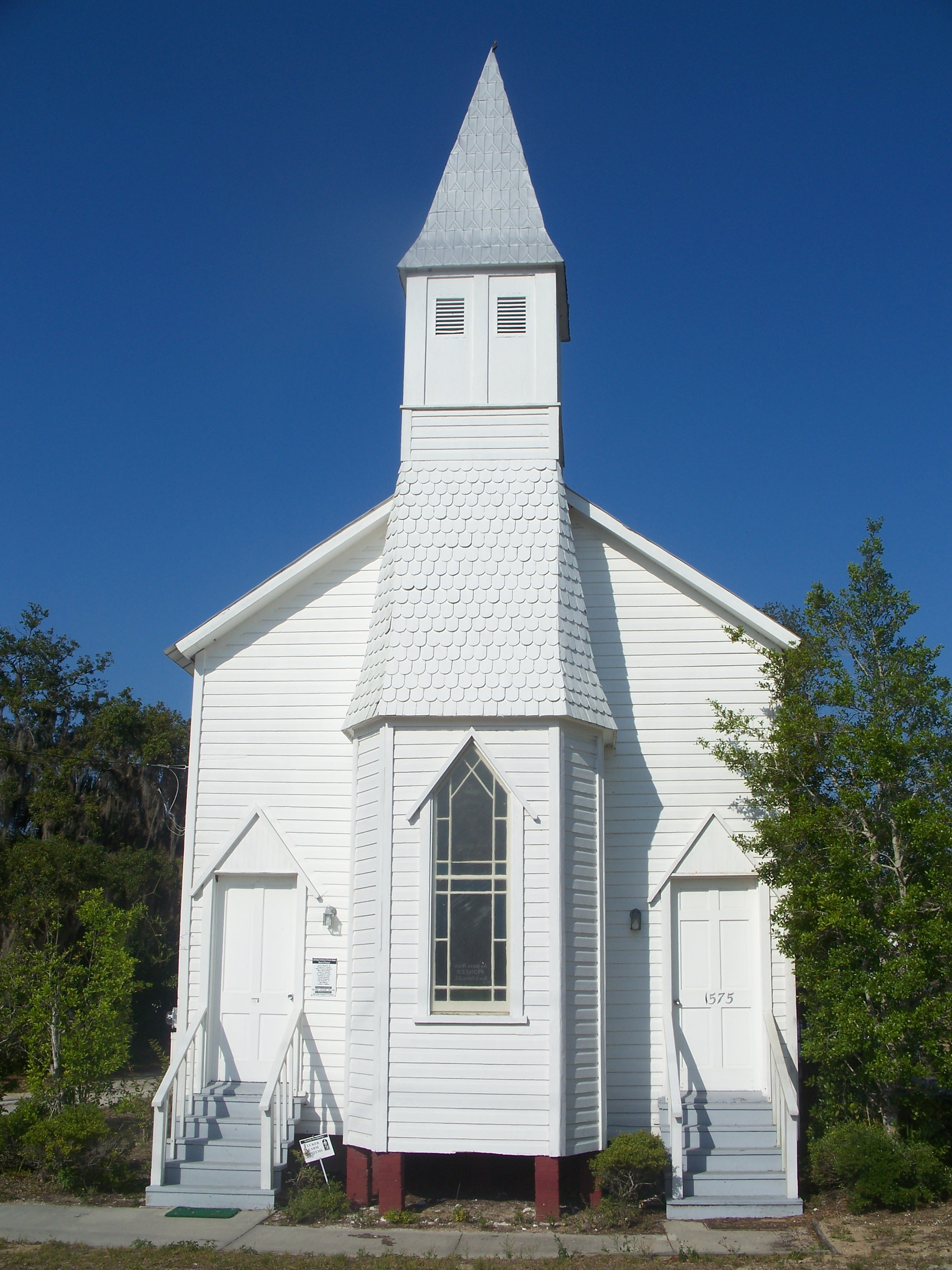
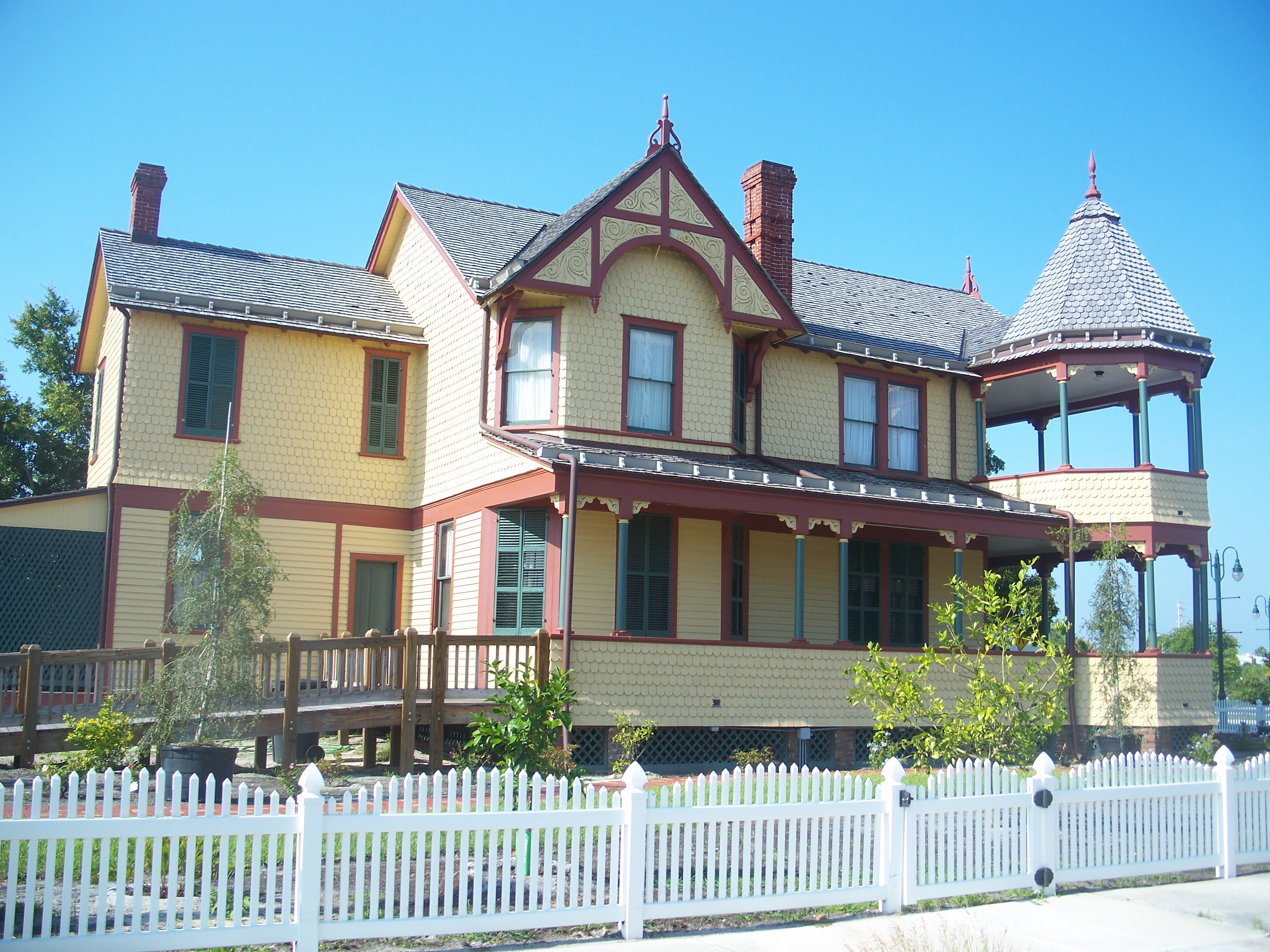
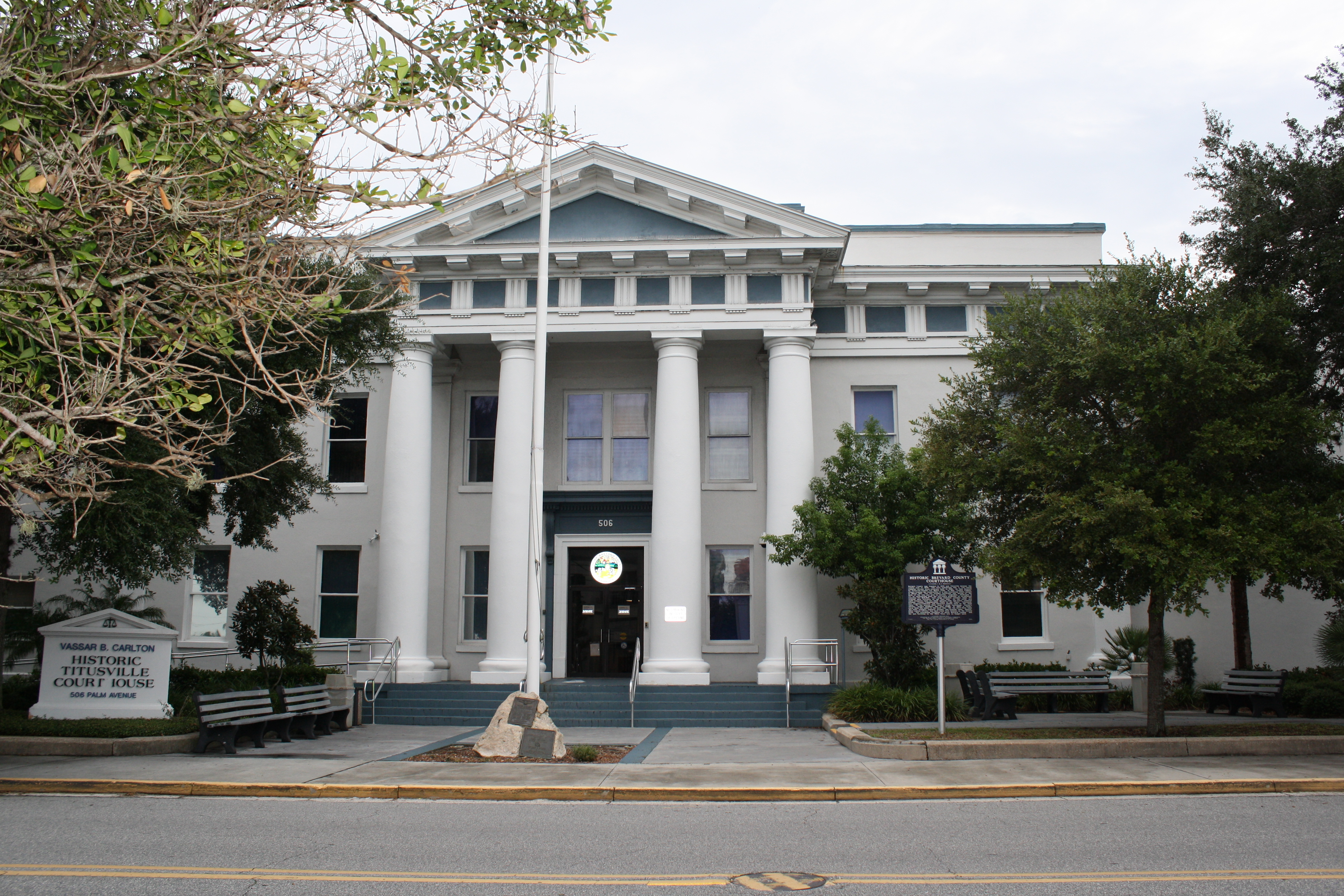
- City hall A. Max Brewer Bridge Titusville Commercial District St. Gabriel's Episcopal Church La Grange Church Pritchard House Old Brevard County Courthouse

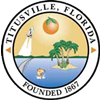
- Seal
- Nickname: "Miracle City"
- Motto: "Gateway To Nature And Space"
- Location in Brevard County and the U.S. state of Florida
- Coordinates: 28°35′28″N 80°48′50″W
- Country: United States
- State: Florida
- County: Brevard
- Settled (Sand Point): 1859-1873
- Incorporated (city): 1887; 139 years ago
- Founder: Henry T. Titus

Government
  - Type: Council-Manager

Area
  - Total: 34.31 sq mi (88.87 km^{2})
  - Land: 29.22 sq mi (75.69 km^{2})
  - Water: 5.09 sq mi (13.18 km^{2})
- Elevation: 20 ft (6.1 m)

Population (2020)
  - Total: 48,789
  - Density: 1,669.5/sq mi (644.59/km^{2})
- Time zone: UTC-5 (Eastern (EST))
  - Summer (DST): UTC-4 (EDT)
- ZIP codes: 32780-32783, 32796
- Area code: 321
- FIPS code: 12-71900
- GNIS feature ID: 2405592
- Website: titusville.com

Titusville is a city in and the county seat of Brevard County, Florida, United States. As of the 2020 census, the population of the city was 48,789, up from 43,761 at the 2010 census. Titusville is located along the Indian River, west of Merritt Island and Kennedy Space Center, and south-southwest of Canaveral National Seashore. It is a principal city of the Palm Bay-Melbourne-Titusville, Florida metropolitan statistical area.

A secondary, de facto county seat was established beginning in 1989, at Viera, Florida, in the geographic center of the county, to better serve the more populous southern portion of the county.

== History ==
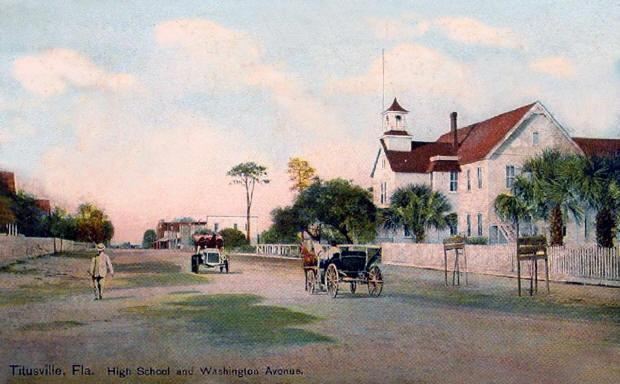
Washington Avenue c. 1910

Indigenous peoples had inhabited the area for thousands of years, as shown by discovery in 1982 of the Windover Archeological Site, dating to the middle Archaic Period (6000 to 5000 BC). It has been designated as a National Historic Landmark because of the significance of its remains.

At the time of European encounter, the area was inhabited by the Ais Indians, who gathered palmetto, cocoplum, and seagrape berries. They fished the Indian River, called the Rio de Ais by Spanish explorers. By 1760, however, the tribe had disappeared due largely to infectious disease, slave raids, and the disruptive effects of rum.

The United States acquired Florida from Spain in 1821, and the Seminole Wars delayed settlement of portions of the new territory. A community was originally called Sand Point, and a post office was established in 1859, although it closed a few months later. Henry T. Titus arrived in 1867, intending to build a town on land owned by his wife, Mary Hopkins Titus, daughter of a prominent planter from Darien, Georgia. He laid out roads and in 1870 erected the Titus House, a large, one-story hotel next to a saloon. He also donated land for four churches and a courthouse, the latter an effort to get the town designated as county seat.

Local history says that Titus challenged Capt. Clark Rice to a game of dominoes to decide the name of the town. Titus won the game and Sand Point was renamed as Titusville in 1873. The city was incorporated in 1887, the year construction began on St. Gabriel's Episcopal Church, as listed in the 1972 National Register of Historic Places. At one point, Titusville was nicknamed "The City of Churches".

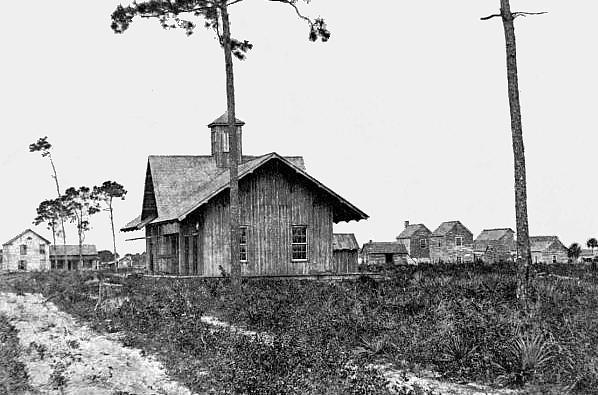
Railroad depot c. 1905

The Atlantic Coast, St. Johns & Indian River Railroad reached Titusville in 1885, constructed from Enterprise, Florida. It was connected by a spur line to the Jacksonville, Tampa & Key West Railroad at Enterprise Junction in present-day DeBary, Florida. Henry Flagler extended his Florida East Coast Railroad south from Daytona, building a station at Titusville in 1892. Many tourists arrived by railroad to enjoy the mild winter climate.

In addition, the railroad was a means to ship area produce to northern markets, and the Indian River area increasingly became an agricultural and shipping center for pineapple and citrus goods. A wooden bridge was built east to Playalinda Beach in 1922.

In October 1918, Titusville officials were the first in the county to order closed all places of assembly, including schools, churches, and movies, to avoid spreading the Spanish flu. Beginning in the late 1950s, the growth of Cape Canaveral and later Kennedy Space Center on Merritt Island stimulated growth in the community's economy, population, and tourism. The association with the space program led to the city's two nicknames in the 1960s: Space City USA and Miracle City.

Searstown Mall opened in 1966. Miracle City Mall opened in 1968, built on 32 acres (13 ha). It had 275,000 square feet (25,500 m^{2}) of covered floor space. The jail at the county courthouse became overcrowded by the 1980s. A jailhouse was built in Sharpes in 1986.Computer Shopper was founded in Titusville in 1979 by Glenn Patch, first as a tabloid. It was later expanded as a magazine of over 800 pages per issue. It was published in Titusville until September 1989. Operations were to be moved to New York City in 1989 in a joint venture between Patch Communications of Titusville and Ziff Davis.

The A. Max Brewer Bridge, a 65-foot (20 m), fixed, high-level span, on SR-406 connecting Titusville to Merritt Island National Wildlife Refuge and Canaveral National Seashore, opened on February 5, 2011, to replace the former swing bridge built in 1949. In May 2012, the Brevard County School Board closed Riverview Elementary School for budgetary reasons. It closed South Lake Elementary School on May 25, 2013.

In January 2013, the Miracle City Mall closed, a victim of a declining local economy after the termination of the Space Shuttle program in 2012. In addition, county population had moved to the south, and changing shopping habits had adversely affected malls across the country. Demolition of Miracle City Mall occurred February 2015 and a mixed-use outdoor shopping complex called Titus Landing was built on the site. Because of population decline, the USPS had closed two post offices in Titusville by 2013, and discussed closing a third.

== Geography ==
Titusville is located in the northern half of Brevard County. According to the U.S. Census Bureau, the city has a total area of 34.2 square miles (88.7 km^{2}), of which 4.9 square miles (12.7 km^{2}) (14.26%) is covered by water. Titusville is located on the Indian River Lagoon, part of the Intracoastal Waterway.

=== Flora ===
The city is the only place in the world where the endangered Dicerandra thinicola, "Titusville mint" grows. The fields are along a 13 miles (21 km) strip between the Titusville wellfield and Mims.

=== Climate ===
Titusville has a humid subtropical climate, with hot, humid summers and mild winters.

Climate data for Titusville, Florida, 1991–2020 normals, extremes 1901–present
Month	Jan	Feb	Mar	Apr	May	Jun	Jul	Aug	Sep	Oct	Nov	Dec	Year
Record high °F (°C)	88 (31)	92 (33)	94 (34)	97 (36)	102 (39)	103 (39)	103 (39)	101 (38)	101 (38)	99 (37)	93 (34)	88 (31)	103 (39)
Mean maximum °F (°C)	82.3 (27.9)	84.1 (28.9)	87.0 (30.6)	88.9 (31.6)	93.3 (34.1)	95.3 (35.2)	96.3 (35.7)	95.7 (35.4)	93.7 (34.3)	90.6 (32.6)	86.1 (30.1)	83.3 (28.5)	97.3 (36.3)
Mean daily maximum °F (°C)	68.8 (20.4)	71.2 (21.8)	75.1 (23.9)	79.4 (26.3)	84.1 (28.9)	87.7 (30.9)	89.9 (32.2)	89.3 (31.8)	87.1 (30.6)	82.6 (28.1)	76.1 (24.5)	71.2 (21.8)	80.2 (26.8)
Daily mean °F (°C)	59.6 (15.3)	62.4 (16.9)	66.2 (19.0)	71.0 (21.7)	76.4 (24.7)	80.3 (26.8)	82.1 (27.8)	82.0 (27.8)	80.5 (26.9)	75.6 (24.2)	68.4 (20.2)	62.8 (17.1)	72.3 (22.4)
Mean daily minimum °F (°C)	50.4 (10.2)	53.5 (11.9)	57.2 (14.0)	62.5 (16.9)	68.8 (20.4)	72.9 (22.7)	74.3 (23.5)	74.8 (23.8)	73.9 (23.3)	68.5 (20.3)	60.7 (15.9)	54.3 (12.4)	64.3 (17.9)
Mean minimum °F (°C)	33.3 (0.7)	36.9 (2.7)	41.3 (5.2)	49.7 (9.8)	59.4 (15.2)	67.9 (19.9)	69.6 (20.9)	70.5 (21.4)	68.4 (20.2)	54.0 (12.2)	44.7 (7.1)	37.8 (3.2)	31.3 (−0.4)
Record low °F (°C)	19 (−7)	23 (−5)	26 (−3)	35 (2)	45 (7)	56 (13)	58 (14)	60 (16)	51 (11)	40 (4)	27 (−3)	19 (−7)	19 (−7)
Average precipitation inches (mm)	3.05 (77)	2.56 (65)	3.37 (86)	2.69 (68)	3.71 (94)	7.87 (200)	6.77 (172)	7.80 (198)	7.46 (189)	5.06 (129)	2.51 (64)	2.35 (60)	55.20 (1,402)
Average precipitation days (≥ 0.01 in)	8.5	6.3	7.2	5.7	7.5	14.3	13.8	14.7	13.9	10.2	7.4	8.0	117.5
Source: NOAA

== Demographics ==
Historical population
Census	Pop.	Note	%±
1890	746		—
1900	756		1.3%
1910	868		14.8%
1920	1,361		56.8%
1930	2,089		53.5%
1940	2,220		6.3%
1950	2,604		17.3%
1960	6,410		146.2%
1970	30,515		376.1%
1980	31,910		4.6%
1990	39,394		23.5%
2000	40,670		3.2%
2010	43,761		7.6%
2020	48,789		11.5%
U.S. Decennial Census

=== Racial and ethnic composition ===
Titusville racial composition (Hispanics excluded from racial categories) (NH = Non-Hispanic)
Race	Pop 2010	Pop 2020	% 2010	% 2020
White (NH)	33,445	33,944	76.43%	69.57%
Black or African American (NH)	5,727	6,430	13.09%	13.18%
Native American or Alaska Native (NH)	168	139	0.38%	0.28%
Asian (NH)	596	890	1.36%	1.82%
Pacific Islander or Native Hawaiian (NH)	37	40	0.08%	0.08%
Some other race (NH)	69	239	0.16%	0.49%
Two or more races/multiracial (NH)	894	2,432	2.04%	4.98%
Hispanic or Latino (any race)	2,825	4,675	6.46%	9.58%
Total	43,761	48,789		

=== 2020 census ===
As of the 2020 census, Titusville had a population of 48,789. The median age was 45.8 years; 19.3% of residents were under 18 and 23.5% were 65 or older. For every 100 females, there were 92.3 males, and for every 100 females 18 and over, there were 89.5 males 18 and over. Of the residents, 99.4% lived in urban areas, while 0.6% lived in rural areas.

Of the 21,050 households in Titusville, 24.3% had children under 18 living in them, 39.9% were married-couple households, 20.3% were households with a male householder and no spouse or partner present, and 32.2% were households with a female householder and no spouse or partner present. About 32.3% of all households were made up of individuals, and 15.5% had someone living alone who was 65 or older; 11,012 families were living in the city. The city had 23,433 housing units, of which 10.2% were vacant. The homeowner vacancy rate was 2.6%, and the rental vacancy rate was 8.2%.

Racial composition as of the 2020 census
Race	Number	Percentage
White	35,389	72.5%
Black or African American	6,630	13.6%
American Indian and Alaska Native	189	0.4%
Asian	903	1.9%
Native Hawaiian and other Pacific Islander	41	0.1%
Some other race	1,230	2.5%
Two or more races	4,407	9.0%
Hispanics or Latinos (of any race)	4,675	9.6%

=== 2024 estimate ===
In 2024, the United States Census Bureau estimated that 49,888 people, 20,768 households, and 12,590 families were living in the city.

=== 2010 census ===
As of the 2010 United States census, 43,761 people, 18,174 households, and 11,508 families resided in the city. The median age was 43.4 years. Also, for residents 25 and older in 2010, 89.3% had completed high school, and 22.6% had at least a bachelor's degree.

=== 2000 census ===
As of the 2000 census, 40,670 people, 17,200 households, and 11,094 families lived in the city. The population density was 1,913.4 inhabitants per square mile (738.8/km^{2}). The racial makeup of the city was 83.80% White, 12.64% African American, 0.39% Native American, 0.94% Asian, 0.04% Pacific Islander, 0.73% from other races, and 1.46% from two or more races. Hispanics or Latinos of any race were 3.52% of the population.

Of the 17,200 households, 26.7% had children under the age of 18 living with them, 47.9% were married couples living together, 12.6% had a female householder with no husband present, and 35.5% were not families. About 29.9% were made up of individuals, and 13.9% had someone living alone who was 65 or older. The average household size was 2.32, and the average family size was 2.86. The age distribution was 22.9% under 18, 6.5% from 18 to 24, 26.2% from 25 to 44, 23.2% from 45 to 64, and 20.8% who were 65 or older. The median age was 41 years. For every 100 females, there were 90.8 males. For every 100 females 18 and over, there were 87.1 males.

=== Personal income ===
In 2000, the median income in the city for a household was $35,607 and for a family was $42,453. This had risen to $44,925 median per household in 2010; $24,374 per capita income. Males had a median income of $36,076 versus $23,998 for females. The per capita income for the city was $18,901. About 9.3% of families and 12.4% of the population were below the poverty line, including 17.6% of those under 18 and 6.8% of those 65 or over.

In 2018, Titusville had a median household income of $43,765. Between 2017 and 2018, median household income grew from $42,561 to $43,765.

== Economy ==
In 2010, private business was 24.7% "other"; 21.5% trade, transportation, and utilities, 18.1% professional and business services; 13.7% educational and health services; 12.0% construction; and 10.0% leisure and hospitality. The economy shrunk after layoffs involving the end of the space shuttle program in 2011, since many employees lived in Titusville.

=== Industry ===
Many of Titusville's major employers are aerospace companies. Knight's Armament Company in Titusville is believed to be the state's largest manufacturer of small arms. Parrish Medical Center in Titusville is the city's largest employer. In October 2013, Barn Light Electric Company opened a manufacturing plant, providing work for at least 60 former NASA workers and men who had completed drug rehabilitation.

=== Tourism ===
The city has benefited from tourism associated with the space program, and the TICO Warbird Air Show each March draws about 40,000–50,000 visitors. While 47 miles (76 km) from the event, the city gets a noticeable economic effect from bikers on their way to the annual Daytona Beach Bike Week.

Titusville was the site of Tropical Wonderland, a now-defunct amusement park.

=== Workforce ===
In 2024, the average size of Titusville's labor force was 22,650. Of the group, 21,812 were employed and 838 were unemployed, for an unemployment rate of 3.7%.

=== Housing ===
As of the 2000 census, the 19,178 housing units had an average density of 902.3 per square mile (348.4/km^{2}). In 2008, 55 building permits for 64 units were issued. That was down from 195 permits for 657 units in 2007. The city issued 292 permits for 360 units in 2006.

In 2001, 149 permits were issued for $18.6 million worth of property, with 453 in 2005 for $65.7 million, and 45 in 2010 for $9.5 million. The median home price in 2007 was $158,900.

=== Retail ===
Shopping centers include Walmart Supercenter and Target. They are located in the city's shopping district at the southern end of the city, near the intersection of State Road 405 and State Road 50.

== Arts and culture ==
=== Historic sites and museums ===
- American Police Hall of Fame & Museum
- Judge George Robbins House
- North Brevard Historical Museum
- Pritchard House
- St. Gabriel's Episcopal Church
- Spell House
- Titusville Commercial District
- United States Astronaut Hall of Fame
- U.S. Space Walk of Fame and Museum
- Valiant Air Command Warbird Museum
- Wager House

=== Library ===
The Titusville Public Library is part of the Brevard County Library System.

== Government ==
Titusville is run by a council-manager government. The elected city council serves as the city's legislative branch, while the appointed city manager carries out policies defined by the council. The city is governed according to its charter, adopted on June 3, 1963.

The city has 1.8 police officers per 1000 residents, which is 52% below average statewide for cities of its size.A 2011 study rated the pension fund for city employees as mediocre or poor.

=== City council ===
Titusville's five city council members (one of whom is the mayor) are elected at-large to four-year, staggered terms. As the city's legislative body, the council determines all municipal policies not explicitly covered by the city charter or state legislation. It adopts ordinances and resolutions in addition to cote appropriations, approves budgets, determines the tax rate, and appoints citizens to serve on advisory boards and commissions.

The mayor presides over all city council meetings and votes as a council member. The mayor is the recognized head of city government for ceremonial and military law purposes, but has no regular administrative duties. The vice mayor is chosen from among the council members at their annual organizational meeting and takes the mayor's place during absence or disability. The mayor is Andrew Connors.

== Education ==
In 2007, an estimated 88.1% of all Titusville residents 25 years or older were high-school graduates, and 23.6% had a bachelor's degree or higher. Former schools in the city include Titusville Negro School (1915–1968).

Primary and secondary public schools are run by the Brevard County School Board:

=== Elementary schools ===
- Apollo Elementary School
- Coquina Elementary School
- Imperial Estates Elementary School
- Oak Park Elementary School
- South Lake Elementary School

=== Middle schools ===
- Jackson Middle School
- Madison Middle School
- Sculptor Charter School

=== High schools ===
- Astronaut High School
- Titusville High School

=== Private schools ===
- Lake Fern Montessori Academy
- Park Avenue Christian Academy
- Sculptor Charter School
- St. Teresa Catholic School
- Temple Christian School

== Media ==
=== Television ===
- TitusvilleCityTV|Spectrum Channel 498, AT&T U-verse Channel 99

=== Radio ===
- WIXC-AM
- WNUE-FM
- WPIO-FM

=== Newspapers / Periodicals ===
- Titusville Talking Points Magazine – began publication in 2015 as a multipage document produced by the Titusville Community Relations Department's media services personnel. By 2016, it became a complete magazine published online and in physical print every quarter. TTP—as it is referred to colloquially—is a highly sought-after publication enjoyed by the residents and businesses of Titusville and can be found at Titusville.com/TalkingPoints.
- Titusville Star-Advocate – began publication in 1920 when the East Coast Advocate and Indian River Chronicle merged with the Indian River Star; bought by Henry Hudson in 1925, it became Brevard's first daily newspaper in 1965; the Star-Advocate was sold by Henry Hudson and his son Bob Hudson to Gannett Company in 1965. As part of the deal, publication of the Star-Advocate was to be retained as long as the editor, Bob, wished. Daily publication (Monday to Friday) ceased after January 31, 1975, when the Star-Advocate was changed to a weekly local insert for Titusville residents in Gannett's Florida Today beginning on Wednesday, February 5, 1975. The format was changed from a newspaper to a small tabloid in the early 2000s. In July 2013, publication of the Star-Advocate stopped.
- The North Brevard Beacon – biweekly newspaper based in Titusvillet served the communities of North Brevard; publication started November 5, 2003, and stopped on March 4, 2010.
- The News Observer of North Brevard – semiweekly newspaper based in Titusville ceased publication September 4, 2003, after 15 years.

== Infrastructure ==
=== Roads ===
- U.S. 1
- Interstate 95
- SR 50
- CR 402 (local name A. Max Brewer Memorial Parkway)
- CR 405
- SR 405
- CR 406
- SR 406
- SR 407

=== Transit ===
Titusville is served by Space Coast Area Transit's #1, #2, and #5 routes.

=== Utilities ===
As of 2006, the city-owned water utility drew about 3.8 million US gallons (14 million L) of its water supply from two wellfields tapping a surficial aquifer. A new wellfield drawing 2.75 million US gallons (10.4 million L) per day from the Floridan aquifer was added in 2016. The water department had 22,000 customers in 2010.

=== Airports ===
- Space Coast Regional Airport (commercial aviation) is located just south of the city.
- Arthur Dunn Airpark (general aviation)

=== Healthcare ===
Parrish Medical Center, originally established as North Brevard Hospital in 1958, is the hospital serving Titusville. A new, 371,000-sq.ft., $80 million hospital was completed in 2002. It was the first medical center in the Southeast region designed and constructed using the seven Principles of Evidence-Based Design to create a healing environment. It was also among the first participants of the Pebble Project, a national research initiative to demonstrate that healing environments improve overall quality of care and create life-enhancing environments for patients, families, and employees.

== Notable people ==
- Herb Ball (1918–2000) – basketball player
- Jimi Beach (born 1971) – singer, bassist, percussionist, co-founder of rock band Lo Presher
- Sam Beddingfield (1933–2012) – United States Air Force test pilot and aerospace engineer
- John Bostic (born 1962) – football player
- Jim Browne (1930–2003) – basketball player
- Bob Buhl (1928–2001) – baseball player
- William M. Citron (1896–1976) – U.S. representative from Connecticut
- Scott Clendenin (1968–2015) – bassist for the bands Death and Control Denied
- Cris Collinsworth (born 1959) – football player and sports broadcaster
- Brad Davis (1949–1991) – actor
- Eugene M. Davis (born 1952) – actor
- Joe DeForest (born 1965) – football player and coach
- Bill DeMott (born 1966) – professional wrestler and trainer
- George Diller – public relations specialist for NASA
- Jim Duggan (born 1954) – professional wrestler and business owner
- Daniel Eaton (born 1992) – figure skater
- Jervonte Edmonds (born 1991) – Florida state representative
- John D. Fitzgerald (1906–1988) – writer
- Michael G. Foster (born 1940) – founder of Yoshukai Karate International
- Arthur Ford (1896–1971) – founder of the Spiritual Frontiers Fellowship
- Jeff Fulchino (born 1979) – baseball player
- Winston Gardner Jr. (born 1938) – Florida state senator
- Bernard Giles (born 1953) – serial killer and rapist
- Bart Gunn (born 1965) – wrestler and mixed martial artist
- Michaela Hahn (born 1994) – soccer player
- Lanae' Hale (born 1983) – singer-songwriter
- Reggie Hannah (born 1959) – basketball player
- J. T. Hassell (born 1995) – football player
- Javian Hawkins (born 1999) – football player
- George L. Jones (1918–1997) – United States Army Air Force flying ace during the Korean War
- Eric Kelly (born 1980) – boxer
- Alethea Kontis (born 1976) – writer
- Mitzi Kremer (born 1968) – Olympic swimmer
- John Jurasek (born 1997 or 1998) – YouTuber, food critic, and radio host
- Larry Laoretti (born 1939) – professional golfer
- Annie Laurie (1924–2006) – jump blues and rhythm and blues singer
- Ed Levy (1916–2008) – baseball player
- Hiram Mann (1921–2014) U.S. Air Force airman, member of the Tuskegee Airmen 332nd Fighter Group during World War II
- Wilber Marshall (born 1962) – football player and College Football Hall of Fame inductee
- Evelyn M. Moore (1942–2012) – Paralympian and National Wheelchair Basketball Association hall of fame inductee
- JoAnn H. Morgan (born 1940) – Kennedy Space Center manager and aerospace engineer
- Latavius Murray (born 1990) – football player
- Stephen C. O'Connell (1916–2001) – attorney, chief justice of the Supreme Court of Florida
- Mary Olmsted (1919–2018) – ambassador
- Kario Oquendo (born 2000) – college basketball player
- Frank Parker (1903–1999) – singer and radio/television personality
- Bernard Parrish (1919–1999) – politician
- Scott Rigell (born 1960) – politician
- Randy Schoenwetter (born 1981) – double murderer and attempted rapist
- Greg Shaw (born 1990) – sledge hockey player
- Doug Sisson (born 1963) – baseball player and coach
- Arthur Sixsmith (1880–1969) – ice hockey player
- Deney Terrio (born 1950) – choreographer, actor, and television host
- Henry T. Titus (1823–1881) – pioneer, mercenary, and founder of Titusville
- Daniel Tosh (born 1970) – stand-up comedian, writer, and producer
- Wallace Turner (1921–2010) – journalist
- Forrest L. Vosler (1923–1992) – U.S. Army Air Force radio operator and airman
- Aaron Walker (born 1980) – football player
- Mel Weinberg (1924–2018) – con artist and federal government informant
- Johnny Weissmuller (1904–1984) – Olympic swimmer, water polo player, and actor
- Gerald White (born 1964) – football player
- Thomas Williams (born 2004) – soccer player
