= Community Church =

Community Church may refer to:

== United Kingdom ==
- Bournemouth Community Church
- Bristol Community Church
- Crowborough Community Church
- Metropolitan Community Church London

== United States ==
- Chatsworth Community Church
- Chodae Community Church
- Christ Community Church
- City Point Community Church
- Columbus Community Church
- Cornerstone Community Church
- Dwell Community Church
- Flatirons Community Church
- Grace Community Church
- Granger Community Church
- KingsGate Community Church
- Livingstonville Community Church
- Longview Community Church
- Marble Community Church
- Memorial Community Church
- Metropolitan Community Church
- Mission Community Church
- National Community Church
- Next Step Community Church
- North Pointe Community Church
- North Point Community Church
- Onnuri Community Church
- Rockdale Community Church
- Roosevelt Community Church
- SaRang Community Church
- Shadow Mountain Community Church
- Stonebriar Community Church
- Walnut Hill Community Church
- Watermark Community Church
- Willow Creek Community Church

== See also ==
- Community Church movement
- Community Church of New York
