= Sharpes, Florida =

- Census-designated place
- Location in Brevard County and the state of Florida
- Coordinates: 28°25′45″N 80°44′58″W
- Country: United States
- State: Florida
- County: Brevard

Area
  - Total: 5.86 sq mi (15.17 km^{2})
  - Land: 2.40 sq mi (6.22 km^{2})
  - Water: 3.46 sq mi (8.95 km^{2})
- Elevation: 0 ft (0 m)

Population (2020)
  - Total: 3,115
  - Density: 1,297.2/sq mi (500.85/km^{2})
- Time zone: UTC-5 (Eastern (EST))
  - Summer (DST): UTC-4 (EDT)
- ZIP code: 32959
- Area code: 321
- FIPS code: 12-65525
- GNIS feature ID: 2402846

Sharpes is a census-designated place (CDP) in Brevard County, Florida. The population was 3,115 at the 2020 United States census, down from 3,411 at the 2010 United States census. It is part of the Palm Bay–Melbourne–Titusville, Florida Metropolitan Statistical Area.

== History ==
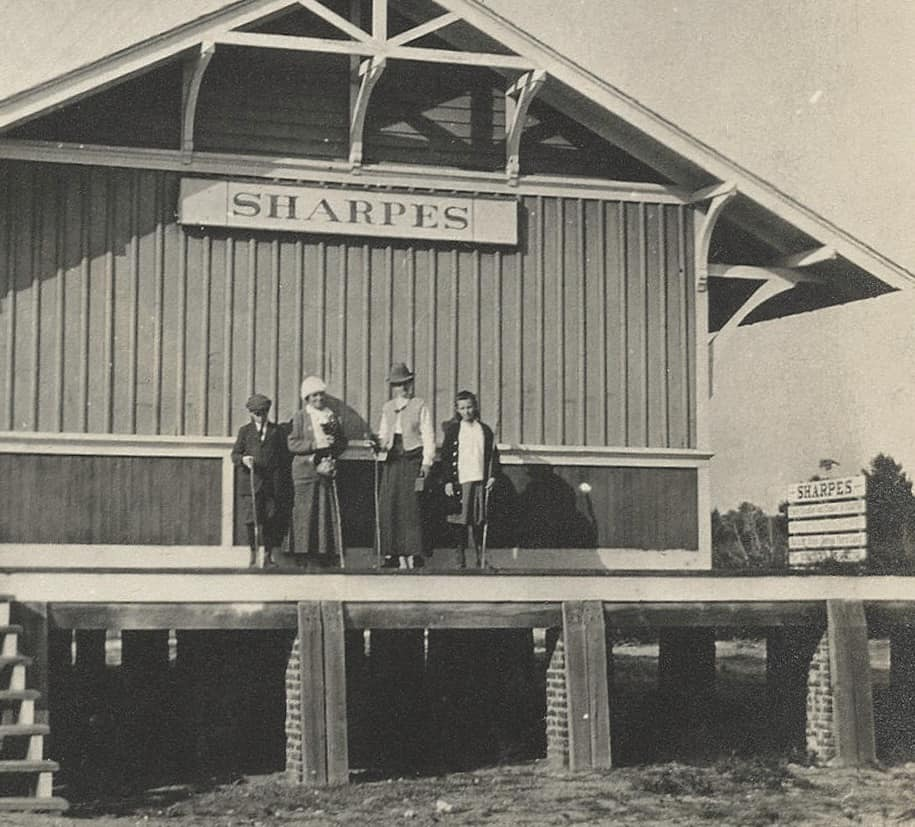
FEC Sharpes Depot c. 1920

Sharpes may have been named after William H. Sharpe, part of the board of trustees formed to construct the City Point Community Church in Cocoa, FL in early 1885. Henry Flagler extended his Florida East Coast Railroad south from Daytona, building a station at Titusville in 1892.

== Geography ==
According to the United States Census Bureau, the CDP has a total area of 6.3 square miles (16 km^{2}), of which 3.0 square miles (7.8 km^{2}) is land and 3.3 square miles (8.5 km^{2}), or 52.46%, is water.

== Demographics ==
Historical population
| Census | Pop. | Note | %± |
|---|---|---|---|
| 1990 | 3,348 | | — |
| 2000 | 3,415 | | 2.0% |
| 2010 | 3,411 | | −0.1% |
| 2020 | 3,115 | | −8.7% |
U.S. Decennial Census

=== 2020 census ===
As of the 2020 census, Sharpes had a population of 3,115. The median age was 49.0 years. 19.4% of residents were under the age of 18 and 21.0% of residents were 65 years of age or older. For every 100 females there were 101.5 males, and for every 100 females age 18 and over there were 100.1 males age 18 and over.

100.0% of residents lived in urban areas, while 0.0% lived in rural areas.

There were 1,332 households in Sharpes, of which 23.2% had children under the age of 18 living in them. Of all households, 35.4% were married-couple households, 27.1% were households with a male householder and no spouse or partner present, and 26.1% were households with a female householder and no spouse or partner present. About 31.1% of all households were made up of individuals and 14.7% had someone living alone who was 65 years of age or older.

There were 1,522 housing units, of which 12.5% were vacant. The homeowner vacancy rate was 2.6% and the rental vacancy rate was 7.4%.

Racial composition as of the 2020 census
| Race | Number | Percent |
|---|---|---|
| White | 2,604 | 83.6% |
| Black or African American | 131 | 4.2% |
| American Indian and Alaska Native | 16 | 0.5% |
| Asian | 25 | 0.8% |
| Native Hawaiian and Other Pacific Islander | 7 | 0.2% |
| Some other race | 74 | 2.4% |
| Two or more races | 258 | 8.3% |
| Hispanic or Latino (of any race) | 226 | 7.3% |

=== 2000 census ===
As of the 2000 census, there were 3,415 people, 1,478 households, and 947 families residing in the CDP. The population density was 1,144.7 inhabitants per square mile (442.0/km^{2}). There were 1,680 housing units at an average density of 563.1 per square mile (217.4/km^{2}). The racial makeup of the CDP was 91.92% White, 3.54% African American, 0.88% Native American, 0.64% Asian, 0.70% from other races, and 2.31% from two or more races. Hispanic or Latino of any race were 2.34% of the population.

There were 1,478 households, out of which 23.8% had children under the age of 18 living with them, 46.8% were married couples living together, 12.6% had a female householder with no husband present, and 35.9% were non-families. 28.7% of all households were made up of individuals, and 11.9% had someone living alone who was 65 years of age or older. The average household size was 2.30 and the average family size was 2.77.

In the CDP, the population was spread out, with 21.4% under the age of 18, 6.0% from 18 to 24, 28.1% from 25 to 44, 24.8% from 45 to 64, and 19.7% who were 65 years of age or older. The median age was 42 years. For every 100 females, there were 97.7 males. For every 100 females age 18 and over, there were 95.8 males.

The median income for a household in the CDP was $27,692, and the median income for a family was $33,825. Males had a median income of $27,500 versus $19,231 for females. The per capita income for the CDP was $16,039. About 12.6% of families and 18.7% of the population were below the poverty line, including 16.1% of those under age 18 and 14.8% of those age 65 or over.

== Economy ==
The Florida Power and Light (FPL) "Cape Canaveral" plant is located here. In 2010, FPL razed its two 45-year-old landmark towers, each 397 feet (121 m), each weighing 7,200 short tons (6,500 t). The destruction of the 1960s-era plant paved the way for U.S.-produced natural gas-fired plants. In 2011, construction was started on $1.1 billion gas-fired plants. Up to 600 workers were employed for the construction.

The Brevard County Jail Complex is located in Sharpes. It is owned and maintained by the Board of County Commissioners and operated by the Brevard County Sheriff's Office. The jail is accredited through the Florida Corrections Accreditation Commission. The main jail opened in 1986 with beds for 386 inmates. Currently the Jail Complex routinely houses over 1,800 inmates daily with 1,321 permanent inmate beds. There has been a jail as long as there has been a sheriff and a county court. The jail was formerly located in Titusville, Florida, in the Courthouse complex. In 2013, the jail re-introduced chain gangs as a deterrent on crime in a pilot project. Ex-convict Larry Lawton was critical of this, saying a better use of law enforcement resources would be to combat drug addiction because he says it is a "contributing factor" to criminal activity.

The Brevard Correctional Institution is located west of the county jail. Despite its name, it is operated by the state. It was built in 1977. It houses up to 1,000 inmates. It employs 238 people. In 2010, it cost $30.8 million to operate. In 2011, it needed $6.2 million to repair. The state decided to close it in March 2011.
