= Christianity in the Dallas–Fort Worth metroplex =

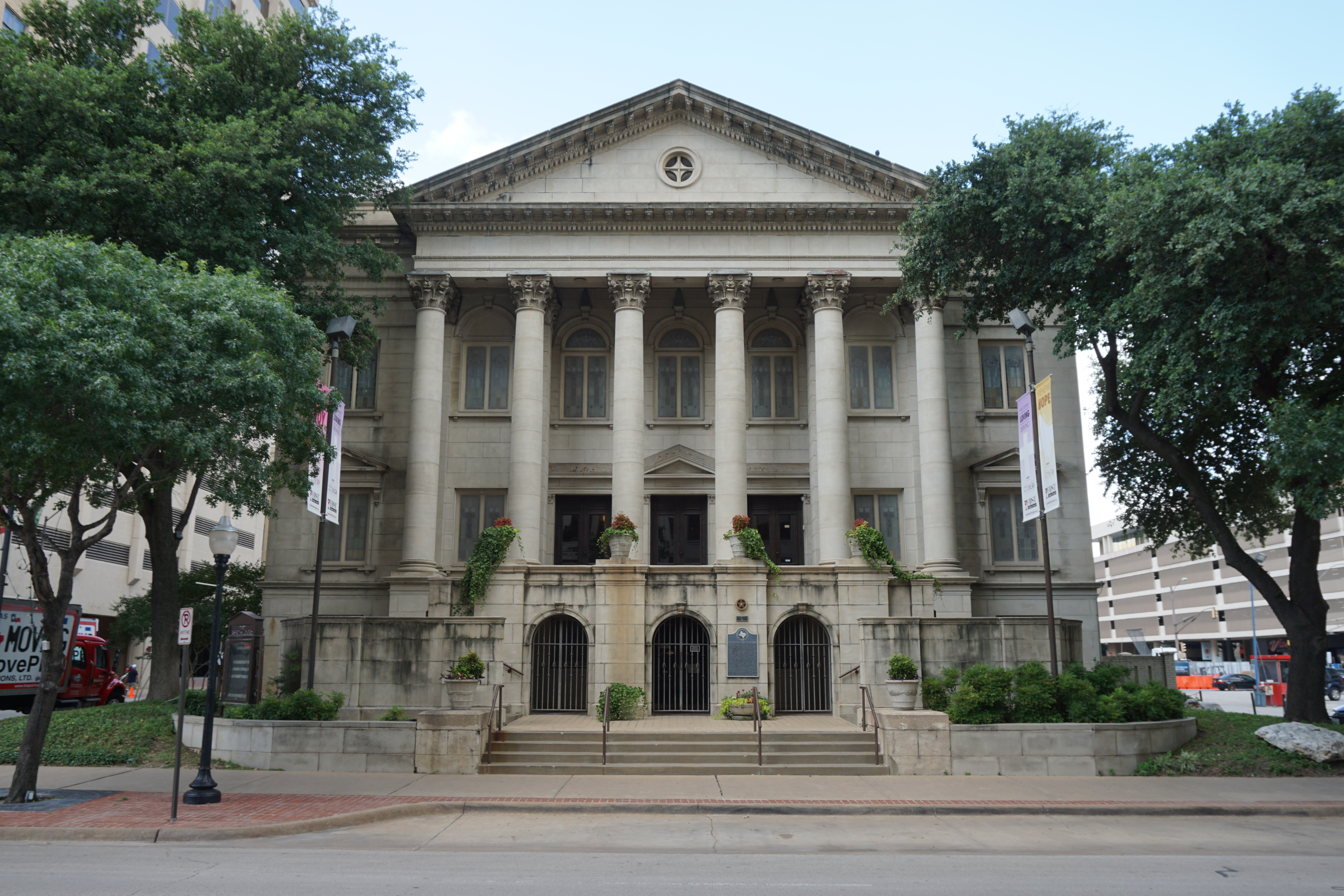
First Christian Church in Fort Worth

The Dallas–Fort Worth metroplex is located inside of the Bible Belt, and is home to three of the twenty-five largest megachurches in the country. According to Pew Research as of 2014, the Dallas–Fort Worth metroplex has the largest Christian population by percentage out of any large metropolitan area in the United States at 78%. 46.8% of metroplex residents are highly religious, and 29.6% are moderately religious. In a 2017 survey, 37% of metroplex residents reported reading the Bible in the past week and strongly agreeing that the Bible is accurate, the 25th highest percentage among U.S. cities.

== List of notable churches ==
Name	Picture	Denomination	Location	Description
Gateway Church		Non-denominational	Southlake	As of 2018, ranked the fourth largest megachurch in the USA. Estimated 28,000 weekly visitors.
Potter's House Christian Fellowship		Non-denominational	Dallas	
St. Patrick Cathedral		Catholicism	Fort Worth	The first Catholic parish in Fort Worth that was formed in 1876.
First Baptist Church of Dallas		Southern Baptist	Downtown Dallas	
Watermark Community Church		Non-denominational		
Fellowship Church				
Park Cities Presbyterian Church				
Prestonwood Baptist Church		Southern Baptist	Plano	
Stonebriar Community Church		Non-denominational		
Highland Park United Methodist Church		United Methodist	Highland Park	

== Demographics ==
As of 2014, according to Pew Research, Evangelical Protestants (includes family denominations under Baptist, Methodist, Lutheran, Pentecostal and more churches) are the largest religious group at 38%, followed by the unaffiliated at 18%, Catholicism at 15% and Mainline Protestants (includes American Baptist Churches USA, United Methodist Church, ELCA, Presbyterian Church and more) at 14%.

As of 2000 the Dallas Metropolitan Community Church (MCC), an LGBT-friendly church, has 3,000 members, making it the largest MCC in the United States.

Christianity in the Dallas–Fort Worth metroplex (2014)
1. Evangelical Protestant (38.0%)
2. Mainline Protestant (14.0%)
3. Historically Black Protestant (7.00%)
4. Catholic (15.0%)
5. Orthodox Christian (1.00%)
6. Mormon (1.00%)
7. Jehovah's Witness (1.00%)
8. Other Christian (1.00%)
9. Non-Christian Faiths (4.00%)
10. Unaffiliated (18.0%)
