= Reborn in Christ Church =

Evangelical Christian denomination

- Igreja Renascer em Cristo
- Classification: Protestant
- Orientation: Neopentecostal; Evangelicalism
- Scripture: Bible (Protestant canon)
- Theology: Prosperity theology
- Governance: Episcopal
- Apostle: Estevam Hernandes
- Bishop: Sônia Hernandes
- Region: Brazil, Angola and United States
- Headquarters: São Paulo, Brazil
- Founder: Estevam Hernandes and Sonia Hernandes
- Origin: 1986; São Paulo
- Separated from: Pentecostal Church of the Bible of Brazil
- Temples: 315 (2017)
- Official website: Official page
- Slogan: Uma igreja de milagres. (A church of miracles)

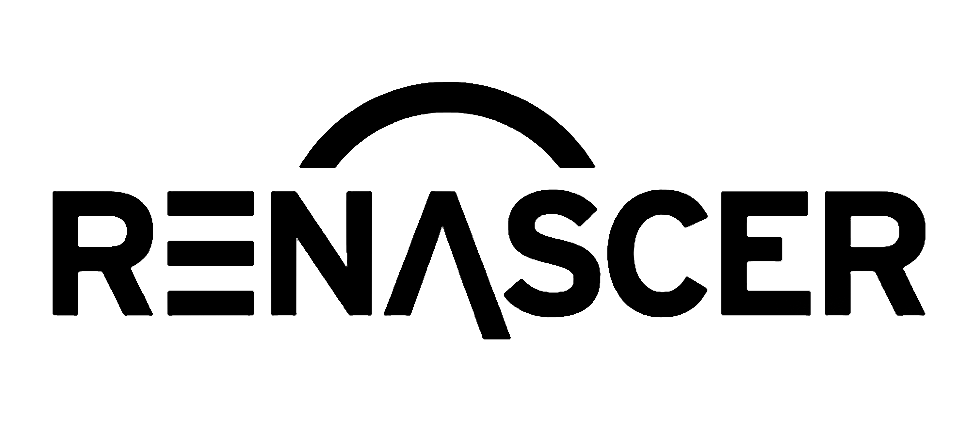
Logo of the Reborn in Christ Church

Reborn in Christ Church (Portuguese: Igreja Renascer em Cristo) is an Evangelical Christian denomination headquartered in São Paulo, Brazil. The church was founded in 1986 by the couple Apostle Estevam Hernandes and Bishop Sônia Hernandes.

== History ==
It was founded in São Paulo in 1986 by Estevam Hernandes and Sônia Hernandes. As of 2007, the church has over 2,000,000 members and more than 1,500 temples in Brazil and around the world. As of 2011, the number of church temples dropped to 315, the vast majority in the Brazilian state of São Paulo, in addition to a tiny presence in the United States and Angola.

Despite not being among the largest Protestant denominations in Brazil, the church attracts a large evangelical audience of large denominations at major events such as the March for Jesus, which has been held annually in São Paulo since 1993. The Church Renascer em Cristo also has several media outlets, such as the television network Rede Gospel, the radio network Gospel FM, the publisher Editora Gospel, the clothing brand Gospel Wear and the record label Gospel Records.

The founding couple, Estevam Hernandes and Sônia Hernandes, and their organization are under investigation on the basis of money laundering, perjury, libel, exploitation of non-profit status, tax evasion and a number of other criminal actions. In January 2007, both founders were arrested at Miami International Airport by the FBI for failure to declare over $56,000 in cash brought into the United States. The couple were sentenced to five months in prison. Sonia and Estevam Hernandes lived temporarily under court order in their own house in Florida. After leaving the American prison, the couple returned to Brazil.

On January 18, 2009, the main temple of Reborn in Christ Church, in Cambuci, São Paulo, collapsed. The roof fell down, killing 9 people and injuring over 115.

== Donation by Kaká ==
In September 2007, prosecutor Marcelo Mendroni announced that he was investigating Brazilian football star Kaká's relationship with the imprisoned founding couple. On January 3, 2008, Kaká announced that his 2007 FIFA World Player of the Year trophy would be held for display in the church's main temple in Cambuci, São Paulo. On January 14, 2008, the church released a statement expressing its intent to sue prosecutor Marcelo Mendroni for "persecution" in relation to his attempts to question Kaká. Kaká, a member of the church, has allegedly made donations of 2 million reais to the church. In December 2010 Kaká and his wife left the Renascer Church because of the leadership mishandling of money.

== See also ==
- Believers' Church
