= March for Jesus =

Christian event

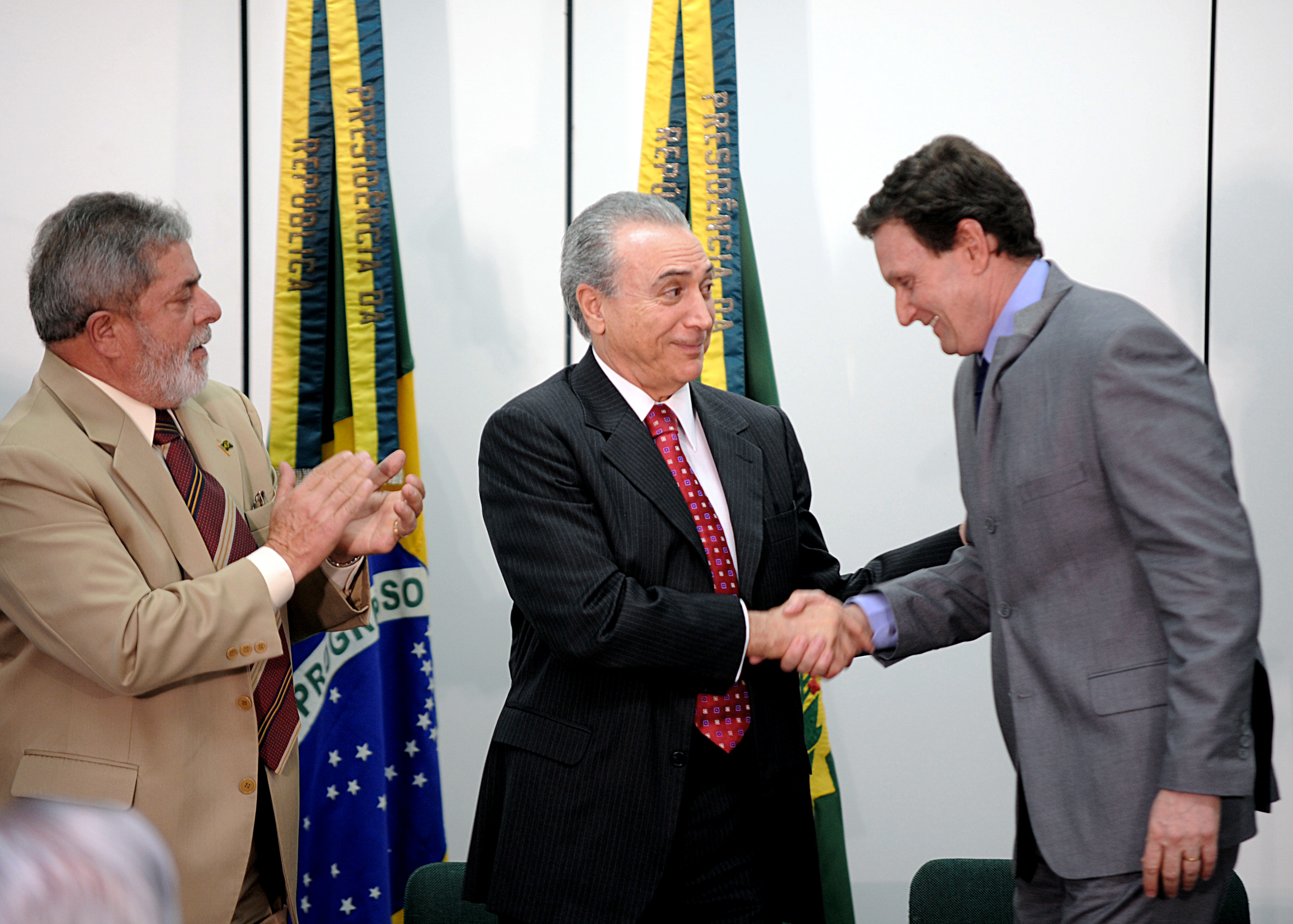
Lula, Michel Temer, and Marcelo Crivella during the sanctioning ceremony of the bill establishing the National Day of The March. Photo: Roosewelt Pinheiro/ABr.

March for Jesus is an annual interdenominational event in which Christians march through towns and cities.

== History ==
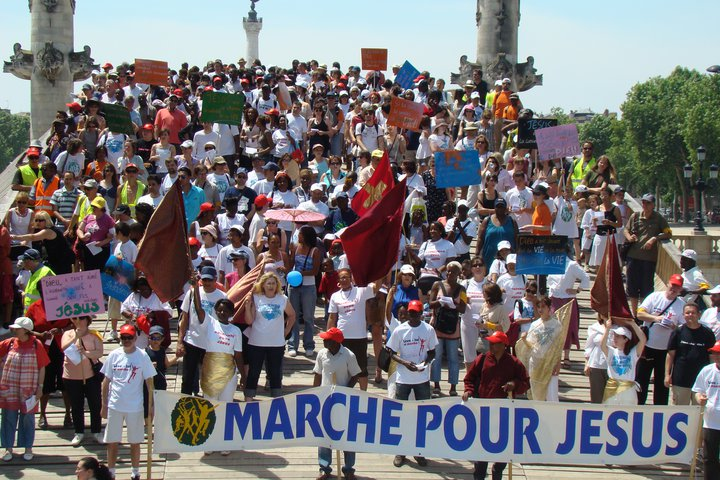
March in Bordeaux, France in 2011

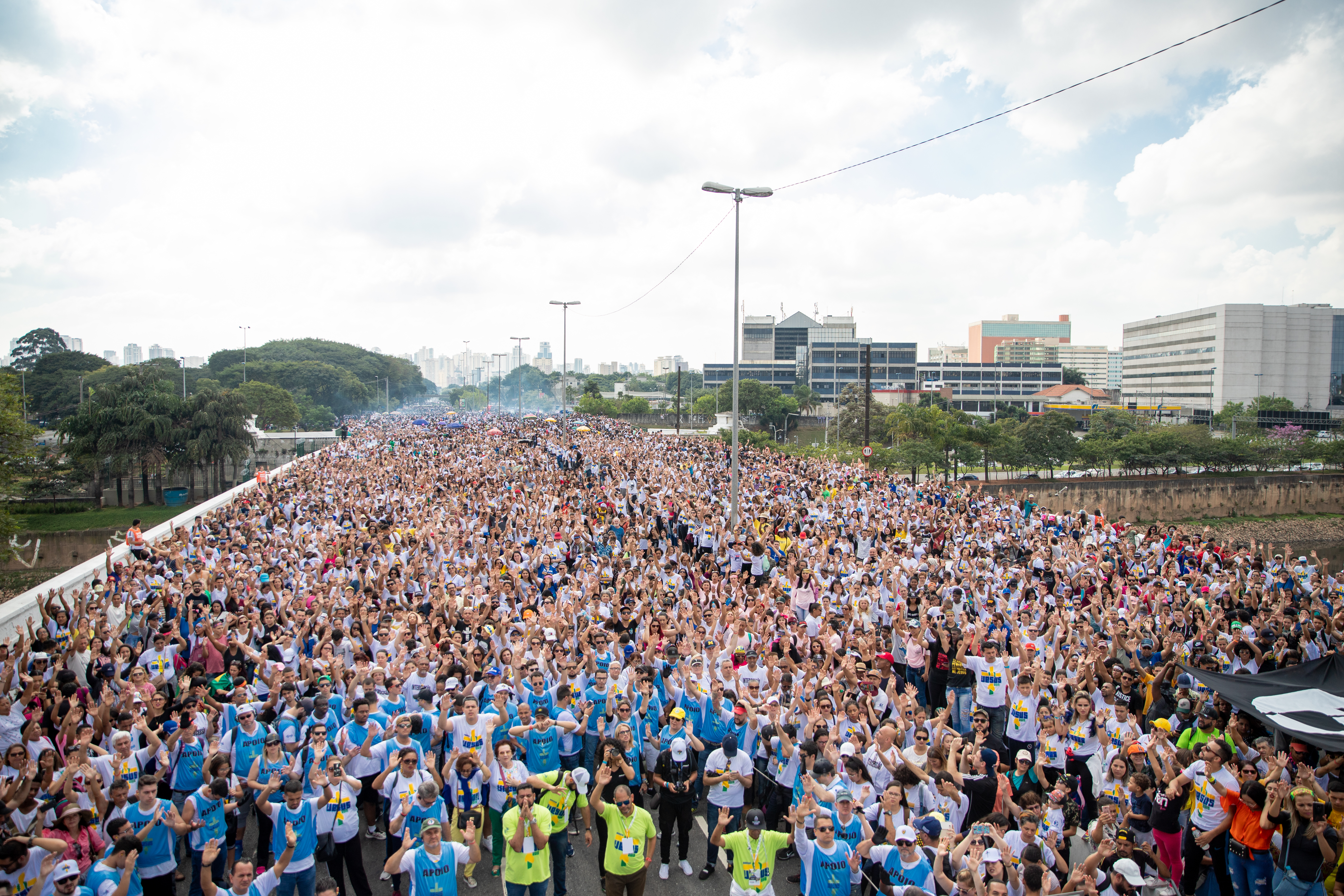
March in São Paulo, Brazil in 2019

The March for Jesus began as a City March in London, United Kingdom, in 1987. It emerged from the friendship of three church groups: Pioneer, led by Gerald Coates; Ichthus led by Roger Forster; and Youth with a Mission led by Lynn Green. Together with the worship leader Graham Kendrick, they led a movement which over the next three years spread across the UK, Europe and North America, and finally across the world. Hundreds of smaller marches emerged in its wake. The initial expectation of 5,000 people was largely surpassed by the presence of 15,000 participants, boosting the realization of an edition of the event.

By 1990, the March had already spread across 49 cities across the UK and also in Belfast (the capital of Northern Ireland), where 6,000 Catholics and Protestants gathered. It was estimated that approximately 200,000 religious participated in the event. The March quickly expanded to the other continents.

The march was established in several countries of the world, especially in France in 1991, in the United States in 1992 and in Brazil in 1993.

In 1994, it was held as a global event, taking place in about 170 countries on the same date with 12 million participants.

In 2019, according to the organizers of the São Paulo march, it brought together 3 million people.

The event's theology has been critiqued for its "emphasis on 'reclaiming the ground' by taking authority over territorial spirits", a concept part of strategic-level spiritual warfare.

== By country ==
=== Brazil ===
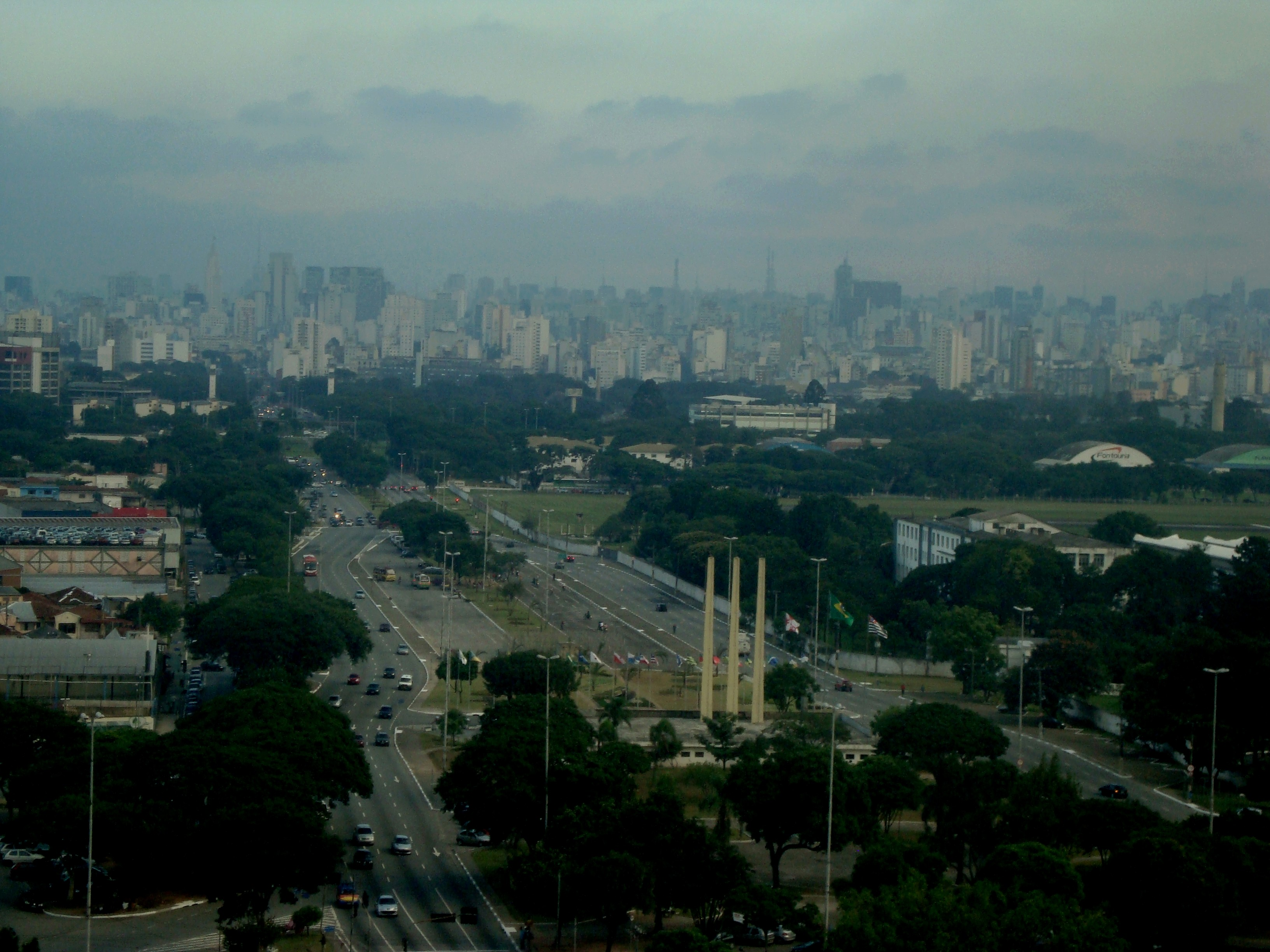
Praça Heróis da FEB and Avenida Santos Dumont in Santana, stages of the São Paulo event.

In order to gather faithful from various Christian denominations, the March for Jesus is organized by the Church Reborn in Christ, Brazil (with the participation of other Neo-Pentecostal groups), the event brings to the street the churches, which march behind electric trios. With the participation of several states of Brazil, caravans (name designated to groups of travelers, pilgrims) from various places gather. The caravans meet at a certain point and go "marching" to the place where a stage is located for eventual shows, as occurred in São Paulo on May 31, 2018.

In 1993, the March For Jesus arrived in Brazil through Estevam Hernandes, one of the founders of the Church Reborn in Christ. This year, the March For Jesus was held in more than 100 cities in various regions of Brazil. Six years later, about 10 million people from approximately 200 countries marched to celebrate the name of Jesus Christ. People of various religions, ages and ethnicities took to the streets of countries such as England, France, Germany, Italy, Northern Ireland, Egypt, Israel, USA, Canada, Russia, Cuba, Finland, Japan, Mozambique, South Africa, Brazil, Argentina, Bolivia, Peru and Chile. In 2013, the event was held for the first time in the Holy Land, Israel. The March for Jesus has been part of Brazil's official calendar since September 2009, when Federal Law 12,025 was sanctioned by Former President Luiz Inácio Lula da Silva. In 2015, the event was attended by approximately 340,000 people.

==== São Paulo ====
Approximate number of participants of the March for Jesus in São Paulo

Year	Participants (according to the Military Police of São Paulo State)	Participants (according to the National Coordinator)
1993		500,000
1994		1,200,000
1995		2,500,000
2000	1,000,000	3,000,000
2001	1,000,000	4,500,000
2002	1,000,000
2003	2,000,000
2004	2,000,000
2005	3,000,000
2006	3,000,000
2007	3,500,000
2008	3,200,000	5,500,000
2009	4,000,000	6,000,000
2010	5,000,000	6,500,000
2011	5,000,000	7,000,000
2012	2,000,000	6,500,000

The first Brazilian event, held in São Paulo in 1993, took about 350,000 people to the streets of the city center, bound for the Anhangabaú Valley, with gospel performances and collection of clothing taking place. Since then, the event has been held in other regions of the city, most of them located in the North Zone of São Paulo. Gathering crowds every year, a milestone of 1 million evangelicals participating was reached in 2000. In 2005 the March was moved to Paulista Avenue, where it was held for another year. In 2007, after an agreement was signed between the Public Prosecutor's Office of São Paulo and the government of Mayor Gilberto Kassab (DEM), there was a restriction on holding events on the Avenue, which, from that date, would host only three events per year.

The March then began to be held in the neighborhoods of Bom Retiro and Santana, gathering more than three million participants annually. The march path begins in the central region of the city at Tiradentes subway station, following Tiradentes Avenue, Ponte das Bandeiras, Avenida Santos Dumont, Campo de Bagatelle Square, and ending at Praça Heróis da FEB, Zona Norte. After the walk, accompanied by more than 10 electric trios, the participants gather at a stage set up in the Heroes Square of FEB, where gospel music performances are held. In 2008, Gilberto Kassab, mayor of the city, said the city was studying the possibility of transferring the event to the Interlagos Racetrack, where the 2009 event would be. The decision, made due to complaints from the population living in the Campo de Bagatelle Square region, caused the discontent of the members of the Reborn in Christ Church, organizer of the March in São Paulo. Thus, in 2010, the 18th March for Jesus took place in the North Zone of the city.

The faithful met at Tiradentes subway station, located on Line 1-Azul, and traveled 4 km until they reached the final point: Campo de Bagatelle Squarein Santana. There, the more than 2 million participants accompanied musical performances by French singer Chris Durán and artists such as Soraya Moraes, Renascer Praise, DJ Alpiste, FLG Quartet, Touch the Altar and Brother Lazarus. The Military Police (MP) said that 2 million people participated in the event. In the following events, the same site was maintained. In 2011, the MP confirmed 1.5 million participants, a number that fell to 335,000 in 2012, according to a survey conducted by the newspaper Folha de S. Paulo. In the following years, the number of participants varied — according to the Military Police, 800,000 people participated in 2013 and 200,000 in 2014; in 2015, the PM counted 340,000, but in 2016 did not disclose the number of participants and the organization of the event estimated that 3 million people attended. The 2017 edition celebrated 25 years of March for Jesus.

Since 1993, March for Jesus has been held annually in hundreds of cities in all states of Brazil, including the Federal District.
