= Graham Kendrick =

British Christian singer, songwriter and worship leader (born 1950)

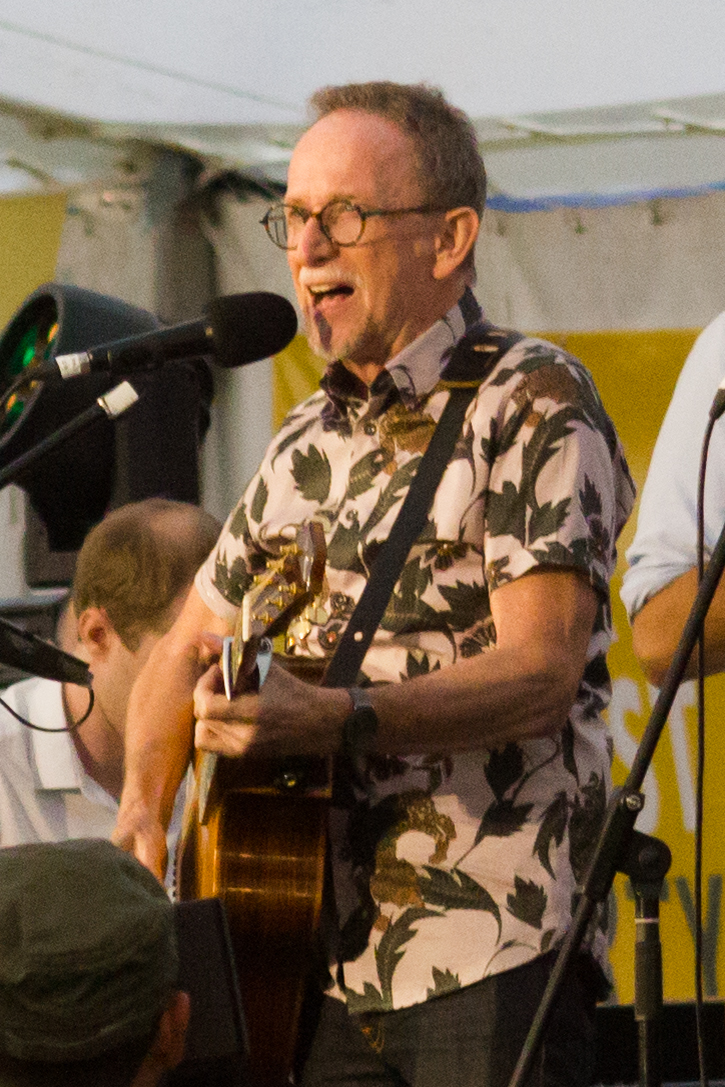
- Kendrick performing in 2019

Background information
- Born: Graham Kendrick; 2 August 1950 (age 75)
- Origin: Blisworth, Northamptonshire, England
- Genres: Contemporary worship music
- Occupations: Musician, songwriter
- Instruments: Vocals, guitar
- Years active: 1971–present
- Labels: Key; Dovetail; Glenmore; Kingsway; Make Way; Star Song; Hosanna! Integrity; Word UK; Megaphone; Alliance; Millennium Chorus Ltd; World Wide Worship; Furious!
- Website: grahamkendrick.co.uk

Graham Kendrick (born 2 August 1950) is a British Christian singer, songwriter and worship leader.

He is the son of Baptist pastor M. D. Kendrick and grew up in Laindon, Essex, and Putney. He now lives in Tunbridge Wells and is a member of Christ Church, Tunbridge Wells. He was a member of Ichthus Christian Fellowship. Together with Roger Forster, Gerald Coates and Lynn Green, he was a founder of March for Jesus.

== Career ==
Kendrick began his songwriting career in the late 1960s. His most successful accomplishment is his authorship of the lyrics and music for the song, "Shine, Jesus, Shine", which is among the most widely heard songs in contemporary Christian worship worldwide. His other songs have been primarily used by worshippers in Britain. Kendrick is a co-founder of the March for Jesus. He received a Dove Award in 1995 for his international work. In 2000, London School of Theology and Brunel University awarded Kendrick an honorary doctorate in Divinity ('DD') in "recognition of his contribution to the worship life of the Church". He was awarded another DD in May 2008, from Wycliffe College in Toronto, Canada.

Although now best known as a worship leader and writer of worship songs, Kendrick began his career as a member of the Christian beat group Whispers of Truth (formerly the "Forerunners"). Later, he began working as a solo concert performer and recording artist in the singer-songwriter tradition. He was closely associated with the organisation Musical Gospel Outreach and recorded several albums for their record labels. On the first, Footsteps on the Sea, released in 1972, he worked with the virtuoso guitarist Gordon Giltrap.

Kendrick worked for a time as a member of "In the Name of Jesus", a mission team led by Clive Calver. He was based at St Michael le Belfrey, York in the late 1970s and was involved in student and university ministry with British Youth for Christ. At this time he recorded the albums Triumph in the Air and Cresta Run. Calver went on to run British Youth for Christ and the Evangelical Alliance, and then left the United Kingdom for the Evangelical Church in the United States.

Kendrick also released "Let the Flame Burn Brighter" as a single in 1989, which reached 55 in the UK Singles Chart.

He is a member of Compassionart, a charity founded by Martin Smith from Delirious?.

In more recent years Kendrick has developed the concept of "Psalm Surfing".

In May 2020 he took part in The UK Blessing, a worship song video collaboration of 65 churches released during the national coronavirus lockdown.

== Popularity ==
"Shine, Jesus, Shine" is regularly highly placed in hymn popularity polls. Fellow songwriter and former Kendrick bandmember Stuart Townend has said, "I have no doubt that in 100 years time the name of Kendrick will be alongside Watts and Wesley in the list of the UK's greatest hymnwriters". Kendrick also has his critics, among them the journalist Quentin Letts, who has described him as "king of the happy-clappy banalities".

== Theology ==
Kendrick's songs written for March for Jesus feature themes of spiritual warfare and prophecy. Regarding the territorial spirits engaged in spiritual warfare, Kendrick has stated, "Satan has the real estate of villages, towns and cities overshadowed by ruling spirits which work untiringly at his command to bring about his malevolent will... ruining lives which God intended for joy, happiness and true worship."

== Discography ==
=== Albums ===
- Footsteps on the Sea (Key Records) 1972
- Bright Side Up (Key Records) 1973
- Paid on the Nail (with Peter Roe) (Key Records) 1974
- Breaking of the Dawn (Dovetail) 1976
- Fighter (Dovetail) 1978
- Jesus Stand Among Us (Dovetail) 1979
- Triumph in the Air (Glenmore Music) 1980
- 18 Classics (Kingsway) 1981
- Cresta Run (Kingsway) 1981
- The King Is Among Us (Kingsway) 1981
- Nightwatch (Kingsway) 1983 – cassette only release
- The Blame (Kingsway) 1983
- Let God Arise (Kingsway) 1984
- Magnificent Warrior (Kingsway) 1985
- Make Way for the King of Kings: A Carnival of Praise (Kingsway) 1986
- Make Way for Jesus: Shine Jesus Shine (Make Way Music) 1987
- Lamb of God (Integrity's Hosanna! Music) 1988 (British version of a 1987 album by Jim Gilbert)
- Make Way for Christmas: The Gift (Make Way Music) 1988
- Make Way for the Cross: Let the Flame Burn Brighter (Make Way Music) 1989
- We Believe (Star Song) 1989
- Amazing Love (Integrity's Hosanna! Music) 1990
- Crown Him (Integrity's Hosanna! Music) 1991
- King of the Nations (Word UK) 1992
- Crown Him: The Worship Musical/Join Our Hearts (Word UK) 1992
- Spark to a Flame (Megaphone/Word UK) 1993
- Rumours of Angels (Megaphone/Alliance) 1994
- Is Anyone Thirsty? (Megaphone/Alliance) 1995
- Illuminations (Megaphone/Alliance) 1996
- No More Walls (Make Way Music/Alliance) 1997
- The Millennium Chorus (Millennium Chorus Ltd) 2000
- What Grace (Make Way Music/Furious!) 2001
- Do Something Beautiful (Make Way Music/Furious!) 2003
- Sacred Journey (Make Way Music/Furious!) 2004
- USA Live Worship (Make Way Music) 2005
- Out of the Ordinary (Make Way Music/Furious!) 2006
- Dreaming of a Holy Night (Make Way Music/Furious!) 2007
- The Acoustic Gospels (Make Way Music) 2010
- Banquet (Make Way Music) 2011
- Worship Duets (Make Way Music) 2013
- Keep the Banner Flying High (Make Way Music) 2018
- Salvation Songs (Make Way Music) 2024

=== Singles ===
- Let the Flame Burn Brighter (single) (Make Way Music) 1989

=== EP ===
- No Scenes of Stately Majesty (E.P; Megaphone/Alliance) 1998
- Where It Began (Make Way Music) 2022

=== Collections ===
- The Easter Collection (Make Way Music/World Wide Worship) 2001
- Rumours of Angels / The Gift Double CD (Make Way Music/Furious!) 2001
- The Prayer Song Collection (Make Way Music/World Wide Worship) 2002
- The Psalm Collection (Make Way Music/World Wide Worship) 2002

== Bibliography ==
- Graham Kendrick Worship (Eastbourne: Kingsway, 1984)
- Graham Kendrick (Ed) Ten Worshipping Churches (London: Marc Europe, 1987)
- Graham Kendrick, Gerald Coates, Roger Forster and Lynn Green with Catherine Butcher, March for Jesus (Eastbourne: Kingsway, 1992)
- Graham Kendrick Public Praise (Altamonte Springs: Creation House, 1992)
- Graham Kendrick, Clive Price Behind the Songs (Stowmarket: Kevin Mayhew Ltd, 2001)
