= Norwood, New Jersey =

Borough in Bergen County, New Jersey, US

- Borough
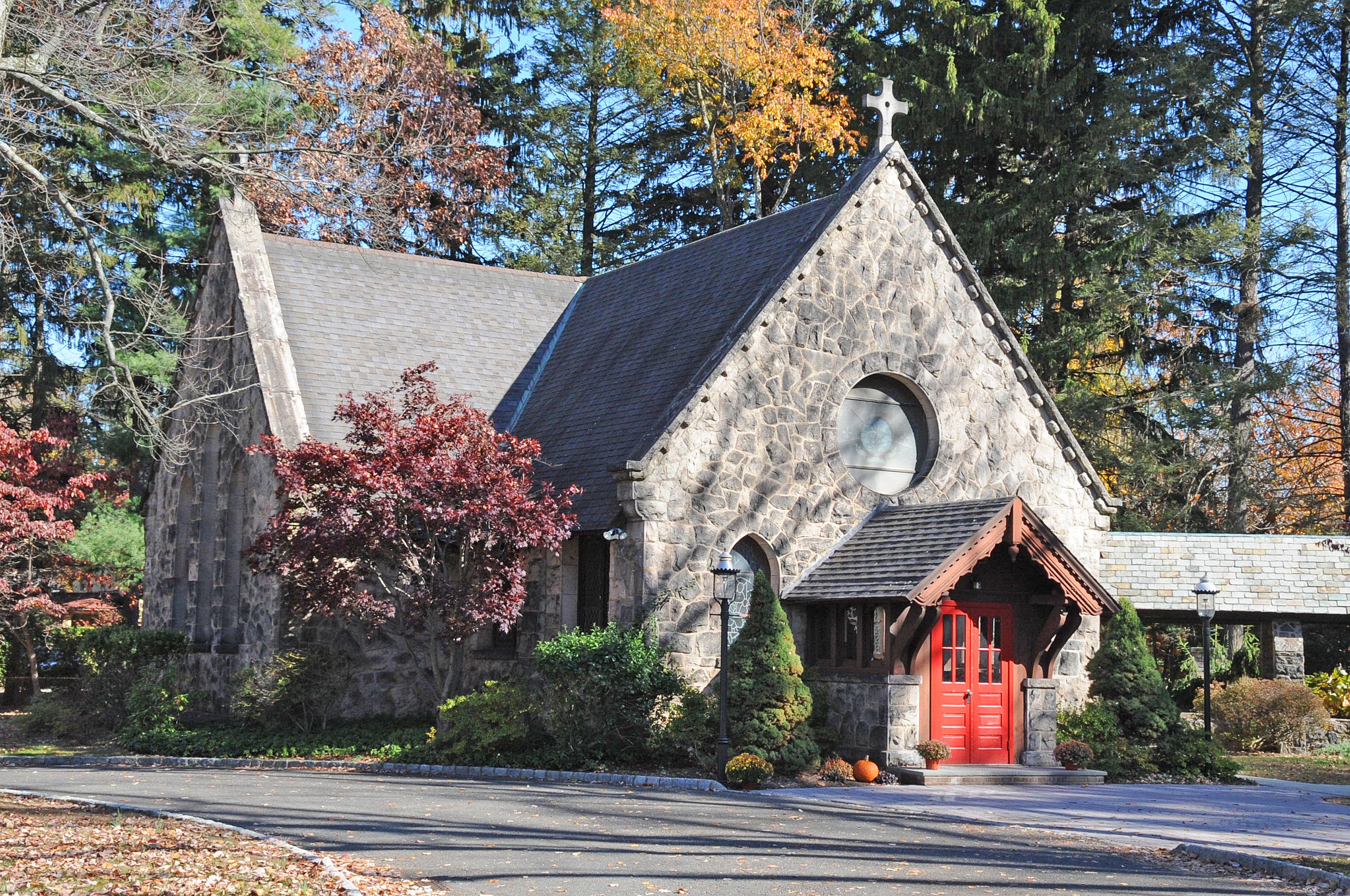
- Church of the Holy Communion

- Seal

- Location of Norwood in Bergen County highlighted in red (left). Inset map: Location of Bergen County in New Jersey highlighted in orange (right).

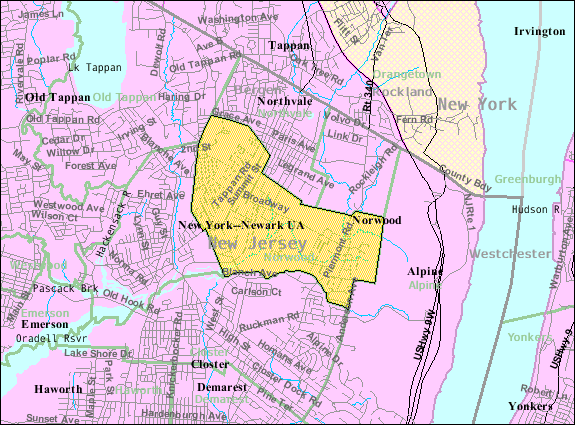
- Census Bureau map of Norwood, New Jersey

- Location in Bergen County Location in New Jersey Location in the United States
- Coordinates: 40.992046°N 73.950551°W
- Country: United States
- State: New Jersey
- County: Bergen
- Incorporated: March 21, 1905
- Named for: "North-woods"

Government
  - Type: Borough
  - Body: Borough Council
  - Mayor: James P. Barsa (R, term ends December 31, 2023)
  - Administrator: Jordan Padovano
  - Municipal clerk: Jordan Padovano

Area
  - Total: 2.80 sq mi (7.24 km^{2})
  - Land: 2.78 sq mi (7.21 km^{2})
  - Water: 0.0077 sq mi (0.02 km^{2}) 0.32%
  - Rank: 355th of 565 in state 32nd of 70 in county
- Elevation: 30 ft (9.1 m)

Population (2020)
  - Total: 5,641
  - Estimate (2023): 5,729
  - Rank: 361st of 565 in state 58th of 70 in county
  - Density: 2,025.5/sq mi (782.0/km^{2})
  - Rank: 295th of 565 in state 57th of 70 in county
- Time zone: UTC−05:00 (Eastern (EST))
  - Summer (DST): UTC−04:00 (Eastern (EDT))
- ZIP Code: 07648
- Area code: 201 exchanges: 750, 767, 768, 784
- FIPS code: 3400353610
- GNIS feature ID: 0885329
- Website: www.norwoodboro.org

Norwood is a borough in Bergen County, in the U.S. state of New Jersey. As of the 2020 United States census, the borough's population was 5,641, a decrease of 70 (−1.2%) from the 2010 census count of 5,711, which in turn reflected a decline of 40 (−0.7%) from the 5,751 counted in the 2000 census.

Norwood was formed as a borough by an act of the New Jersey Legislature on March 14, 1905, from portions of Harrington Township.

== History ==
The territory that became present-day Norwood was originally settled about 1686 by a dozen or more families mostly from the Dutch Republic, who purchased the land under the Tappan Patent. About that time a grant was also given by Philip Carteret, Governor of the Province of East Jersey, during the reign of King Charles II of England. The Lenape, a Native American tribe, roamed the valley.

The name Norwood emanated from the old description of its location in the "North-Woods". It was a part of Harrington Township, which was formed in 1775 from the northernmost portions of Hackensack Township and New Barbadoes Township, stretching from the Hudson River in the east to the Saddle River in the west.

In 1840, the portions of Harrington Township west of the Hackensack River were taken away to create Washington Township. At that point, Harrington Township was somewhat in the form of a square measuring about 5 miles (8 km) on each side, bounded on the north by Rockland County, New York; east by the Hudson River, south by Hackensack Township and west by the Hackensack River. At that time, Norwood, Northvale (once called Neuvy), Old Tappan, Demarest, Closter, and Harrington Park were communities within Harrington Township.

On March 14, 1905, Norwood seceded from its parent Harrington Township and was incorporated as an independent borough.

== Geography ==
According to the United States Census Bureau, the borough had a total area of 2.79 square miles (7.24 km^{2}), including 2.79 square miles (7.21 km^{2}) of land and 0.01 square miles (0.02 km^{2}) of water (0.32%).

Norwood is in the northeastern part of New Jersey, about 2 miles (3 km) from the New York state line. It is bordered by the Bergen County municipalities of Alpine, Closter, Harrington Park, Northvale, Old Tappan and Rockleigh.

Unincorporated communities, localities and place names within the borough include West Norwood.

As of 2026, the borough is a member of Local Leaders for Responsible Planning in order to address the borough's Mount Laurel doctrine-based housing obligations.

== Demographics ==
Historical population
Census	Pop.	Note	%±
1900	400		—
1910	564		41.0%
1920	820		45.4%
1930	1,358		65.6%
1940	1,512		11.3%
1950	1,792		18.5%
1960	2,852		59.2%
1970	4,398		54.2%
1980	4,413		0.3%
1990	4,858		10.1%
2000	5,751		18.4%
2010	5,711		−0.7%
2020	5,641		−1.2%
2023 (est.)	5,729	▲	1.6%
Population sources: 1910–1930 1900–2020; 2000 2010 2020

=== Racial and ethnic composition ===
Norwood borough, New Jersey – Racial and ethnic composition Note: the US Census treats Hispanic/Latino as an ethnic category. This table excludes Latinos from the racial categories and assigns them to a separate category. Hispanics/Latinos may be of any race.
Race / Ethnicity (NH = Non-Hispanic)	Pop 2000	Pop 2010	Pop 2020	% 2000	% 2010	% 2020
White alone (NH)	4,356	3,766	3,196	75.74%	65.94%	56.66%
Black or African American alone (NH)	48	64	74	0.83%	1.12%	1.31%
Native American or Alaska Native alone (NH)	0	0	4	0.00%	0.00%	0.07%
Asian alone (NH)	1,092	1,551	1,809	18.99%	27.16%	32.07%
Native Hawaiian or Pacific Islander alone (NH)	0	1	0	0.00%	0.02%	0.00%
Other race alone (NH)	16	14	8	0.28%	0.25%	0.14%
Mixed race or Multiracial (NH)	67	55	132	1.17%	0.96%	2.34%
Hispanic or Latino (any race)	172	260	418	2.99%	4.55%	7.41%
Total	5,751	5,711	5,641	100.00%	100.00%	100.00%

=== 2020 census ===
As of the 2020 census, Norwood had a population of 5,641. The median age was 47.0 years. 21.5% of residents were under the age of 18 and 23.5% of residents were 65 years of age or older. For every 100 females there were 88.9 males, and for every 100 females age 18 and over there were 85.4 males age 18 and over.

100.0% of residents lived in urban areas, while 0.0% lived in rural areas.

There were 1,943 households in Norwood, of which 35.4% had children under the age of 18 living in them. Of all households, 67.2% were married-couple households, 9.8% were households with a male householder and no spouse or partner present, and 21.0% were households with a female householder and no spouse or partner present. About 19.5% of all households were made up of individuals and 12.7% had someone living alone who was 65 years of age or older.

There were 2,032 housing units, of which 4.4% were vacant. The homeowner vacancy rate was 1.8% and the rental vacancy rate was 4.7%.

=== 2010 census ===
The 2010 United States census counted 5,711 people, 1,927 households, and 1,542 families in the borough. The population density was 2,093.5 per square mile (808.3/km^{2}). There were 2,007 housing units at an average density of 735.7 per square mile (284.1/km^{2}). The racial makeup was 69.25% (3,955) White, 1.37% (78) Black or African American, 0.00% (0) Native American, 27.18% (1,552) Asian, 0.02% (1) Pacific Islander, 1.03% (59) from other races, and 1.16% (66) from two or more races. Hispanic or Latino of any race were 4.55% (260) of the population. Korean Americans accounted for 20.1% of the population.

Of the 1,927 households, 36.8% had children under the age of 18; 67.8% were married couples living together; 9.0% had a female householder with no husband present and 20.0% were non-families. Of all households, 18.2% were made up of individuals and 10.5% had someone living alone who was 65 years of age or older. The average household size was 2.84 and the average family size was 3.23. Same-sex couples headed 7 households in 2010, an increase from the 6 counted in 2000.

23.1% of the population were under the age of 18, 6.5% from 18 to 24, 18.6% from 25 to 44, 31.7% from 45 to 64, and 20.0% who were 65 years of age or older. The median age was 46.1 years. For every 100 females, the population had 88.0 males. For every 100 females ages 18 and older there were 85.4 males.

The Census Bureau's 2006–2010 American Community Survey showed that (in 2010 inflation-adjusted dollars) median household income was $102,132 (with a margin of error of +/− $9,413) and the median family income was $107,356 (+/− $10,538). Males had a median income of $80,837 (+/− $8,419) versus $56,429 (+/− $15,763) for females. The per capita income for the borough was $38,755 (+/− $5,524). About 0.6% of families and 1.3% of the population were below the poverty line, including 0.9% of those under age 18 and 0.9% of those age 65 or over.

=== 2000 census ===
As of the 2000 United States census there were 5,751 people, 1,857 households, and 1,563 families residing in the borough. The population density was 2,091.4 inhabitants per square mile (807.5/km^{2}). There were 1,888 housing units at an average density of 686.6 per square mile (265.1/km^{2}). The racial makeup of the borough was 77.86% Caucasian, 18.99% Asian, 0.83% African American, 0.02% Native American, 0.94% from other races, and 1.36% from two or more races. Hispanics or Latinos of any race were 2.99% of the population.

As of the 2000 Census, 12.69% of Norwood's residents identified themselves as being of Korean ancestry, which was the eighth highest in the United States and sixth highest of any municipality in New Jersey, for all places with 1,000 or more residents identifying their ancestry.

There were 1,857 households, out of which 41.5% had children under the age of 18 living with them, 73.8% were married couples living together, 7.8% had a female householder with no husband present, and 15.8% were non-families. 13.7% of all households were made up of individuals, and 6.0% had someone living alone who was 65 years of age or older. The average household size was 2.97 and the average family size was 3.26.

In the borough the population was spread out, with 25.8% under the age of 18, 5.4% from 18 to 24, 26.9% from 25 to 44, 26.4% from 45 to 64, and 15.6% who were 65 years of age or older. The median age was 41 years. For every 100 females, there were 88.7 males. For every 100 females age 18 and over, there were 84.4 males.

The median income for a household in the borough was $92,447, and the median income for a family was $100,329. Males had a median income of $70,000 versus $37,059 for females. The per capita income for the borough was $40,039. About 2.3% of families and 4.9% of the population were below the poverty line, including 6.4% of those under age 18 and 2.9% of those age 65 or over.

== Government ==
=== Local government ===
Norwood is governed under the borough form of New Jersey municipal government, which is used in 218 municipalities (of the 564) statewide, making it the most common form of government in New Jersey. The governing body is comprised of a mayor and a borough council, with all positions elected at-large on a partisan basis as part of the November general election. A mayor is elected directly by the voters to a four-year term of office. The borough council includes six members elected to serve three-year terms on a staggered basis, with two seats coming up for election each year in a three-year cycle. The borough form of government used by Norwood is a "weak mayor / strong council" government in which council members act as the legislative body with the mayor presiding at meetings and voting only in the event of a tie. The mayor can veto ordinances subject to an override by a two-thirds majority vote of the council. The mayor makes committee and liaison assignments for council members, and most appointments are made by the mayor with the advice and consent of the council.

As of 2026, the mayor of Norwood is Republican James P. Barsa, whose term of office ends December 31, 2027. Members of the Borough Council are Council President Bong June "BJ" Kim (R, 2026) , Joseph Ascolese (R, 2027), Thomas L. Brizzolara (D, 2027), Suzanne Debiasa (D, 2028), Anthony Foschino (R, 2028) and Annie Hausman (D, 2026).

Ermin Suljic was appointed in July 2022 to fill the seat expiring in December 2022 that had become vacant following the resignation of John Rooney.

In November 2018, the borough council selected Anthony Foschino from a list of candidates nominated by the Republican municipal committee to fill the vacant seat expiring in December 2019 that had been held by Frank Marino. In the November 2019 general election, Foschino was elected to serve the balance of the term of office.

=== Federal, state and county representation ===
Norwood is located in the 5th Congressional District and is part of New Jersey's 39th state legislative district.

For the 119th United States Congress, New Jersey's 5th congressional district is represented by Josh Gottheimer (D, Wyckoff). New Jersey is represented in the United States Senate by Democrats Cory Booker (Newark, term ends 2027) and Andy Kim (Moorestown, term ends 2031).

For the 2026–2027 session, the 39th legislative district of the New Jersey Legislature is represented in the State Senate by Holly Schepisi (R, River Vale) and in the General Assembly by Robert Auth (R, Old Tappan) and John V. Azzariti (R, Saddle River).

Bergen County is governed by a directly elected County Executive, with legislative functions performed by a Board of County Commissioners comprised of seven members who are elected at-large to three-year terms in partisan elections on a staggered basis, with either two or three seats coming up for election each November; a Chairman and Vice Chairman are selected from among its seven members at a reorganization meeting held every January. As of 2025, the county executive is James J. Tedesco III (D, Paramus), whose four-year term of office ends December 31, 2026.

Bergen County's Commissioners are Chair Mary J. Amoroso (D, Mahwah, 2025), Vice Chair Steven A. Tanelli (D, North Arlington, 2027), Chair Pro Tem Joan Voss (D, Fort Lee, 2026), Rafael Marte (D, Bergenfield, 2026), Germaine M. Ortiz (D, Emerson, 2025), Thomas J. Sullivan Jr. (D, Montvale, 2025) and Tracy Silna Zur (D, Franklin Lakes, 2027).

Bergen County's elected constitutional officials are Clerk John S. Hogan (D, Northvale, 2026), Sheriff Anthony Cureton (D, Englewood, 2027) and Surrogate Michael R. Dressler (D, Cresskill, 2026).

=== Politics ===
United States presidential election results for Norwood 2024 2020 2016 2012 2008 2004
Year	Republican		Democratic		Third party(ies)	
Year	No.	%	No.	%	No.	%
2024	1,452	47.40%	1,564	51.06%	47	1.53%
2020	1,462	43.15%	1,887	55.70%	39	1.15%
2016	1,249	45.37%	1,415	51.40%	89	3.23%
2012	1,296	50.06%	1,275	49.25%	18	0.70%
2008	1,458	50.77%	1,389	48.36%	25	0.87%
2004	1,461	52.12%	1,317	46.99%	25	0.89%

As of March 2011, there were a total of 3,518 registered voters in Norwood, of which 961 (27.3% vs. 31.7% countywide) were registered as Democrats, 728 (20.7% vs. 21.1%) were registered as Republicans and 1,829 (52.0% vs. 47.1%) were registered as Unaffiliated. There were no voters registered to other parties. Among the borough's 2010 Census population, 61.6% (vs. 57.1% in Bergen County) were registered to vote, including 80.1% of those ages 18 and over (vs. 73.7% countywide).

In the 2016 presidential election, Democrat Hillary Clinton received 1,415 votes (50.5% vs. 54.8% countywide), ahead of Republican Donald Trump with 1,249 votes (44.6% vs. 41.6%) and other candidates with 89 votes (3.2% vs. 3.0%), among the 2,801 ballots cast by the borough's 3,824 registered voters, for a turnout of 73.2% (vs. 72.5% in Bergen County). In the 2012 presidential election, Republican Mitt Romney received 1,296 votes (49.8% vs. 43.5% countywide), ahead of Democrat Barack Obama with 1,275 votes (49.0% vs. 54.8%) and other candidates with 18 votes (0.7% vs. 0.9%), among the 2,604 ballots cast by the borough's 3,683 registered voters, for a turnout of 70.7% (vs. 70.4% in Bergen County). In the 2008 presidential election, Republican John McCain received 1,458 votes (50.3% vs. 44.5% countywide), ahead of Democrat Barack Obama with 1,389 votes (47.9% vs. 53.9%) and other candidates with 25 votes (0.9% vs. 0.8%), among the 2,897 ballots cast by the borough's 3,761 registered voters, for a turnout of 77.0% (vs. 76.8% in Bergen County). In the 2004 presidential election, Republican George W. Bush received 1,461 votes (51.9% vs. 47.2% countywide), ahead of Democrat John Kerry with 1,317 votes (46.8% vs. 51.7%) and other candidates with 25 votes (0.9% vs. 0.7%), among the 2,813 ballots cast by the borough's 3,766 registered voters, for a turnout of 74.7% (vs. 76.9% in the whole county).

Gubernatorial election results for Norwood
Year	Republican		Democratic		Third party(ies)	
Year	No.	%	No.	%	No.	%
2025	1,195	48.80%	1,245	50.84%	9	0.37%
2021	993	50.05%	971	48.94%	20	1.01%
2017	734	45.06%	869	53.35%	26	1.60%
2013	966	66.67%	459	31.68%	24	1.66%
2009	1,031	53.23%	803	41.46%	103	5.32%
2005	955	48.92%	969	49.64%	28	1.43%

In the 2013 gubernatorial election, Republican Chris Christie received 66.7% of the vote (966 cast), ahead of Democrat Barbara Buono with 31.7% (459 votes), and other candidates with 1.7% (24 votes), among the 1,486 ballots cast by the borough's 3,510 registered voters (37 ballots were spoiled), for a turnout of 42.3%. In the 2009 gubernatorial election, Republican Chris Christie received 1,031 votes (52.7% vs. 45.8% countywide), ahead of Democrat Jon Corzine with 803 votes (41.0% vs. 48.0%), Independent Chris Daggett with 92 votes (4.7% vs. 4.7%) and other candidates with 11 votes (0.6% vs. 0.5%), among the 1,957 ballots cast by the borough's 3,630 registered voters, yielding a 53.9% turnout (vs. 50.0% in the county).

United States Senate election results for Norwood1
Year	Republican		Democratic		Third party(ies)	
Year	No.	%	No.	%	No.	%
2024	1,321	45.05%	1,567	53.44%	44	1.50%
2018	1,014	50.37%	941	46.75%	58	2.88%
2012	1,151	48.26%	1,202	50.40%	32	1.34%
2006	983	50.44%	954	48.95%	12	0.62%

United States Senate election results for Norwood2
Year	Republican		Democratic		Third party(ies)	
Year	No.	%	No.	%	No.	%
2020	1,430	42.90%	1,867	56.02%	36	1.08%
2014	637	43.07%	828	55.98%	14	0.95%
2013	445	45.88%	520	53.61%	5	0.52%
2008	1,278	48.65%	1,321	50.29%	28	1.07%

== Education ==
The Norwood Public School District serves students in pre-kindergarten through eighth grade at Norwood Public School. As of the 2024–25 school year, the district, comprised of one school, had an enrollment of 611 students and 49.0 classroom teachers (on an FTE basis), for a student–teacher ratio of 12.5:1.

Students in public school for ninth through twelfth grades attend Northern Valley Regional High School at Old Tappan, together with students from Harrington Park, Northvale and Old Tappan, along with students from Rockleigh who attend the high school as part of a sending/receiving relationship. The school is one of the two schools of the Northern Valley Regional High School District, which also serves students from the neighboring communities of Closter, Demarest and Haworth at the Northern Valley Regional High School at Demarest. As of the 2024–25 school year, the high school had an enrollment of 1,086 students and 106.6 classroom teachers (on an FTE basis), for a student–teacher ratio of 10.2:1. Seats on the high school district's nine-member board of education are allocated based on the population of the constituent municipalities, with one seat allocated to Norwood.

Public school students from the borough, and all of Bergen County, are eligible to attend the secondary education programs offered by the Bergen County Technical Schools, which include the Bergen County Academies in Hackensack, and the Bergen Tech campus in Teterboro or Paramus. The district offers programs on a shared-time or full-time basis, with admission based on a selective application process and tuition covered by the student's home school district.

== Transportation ==
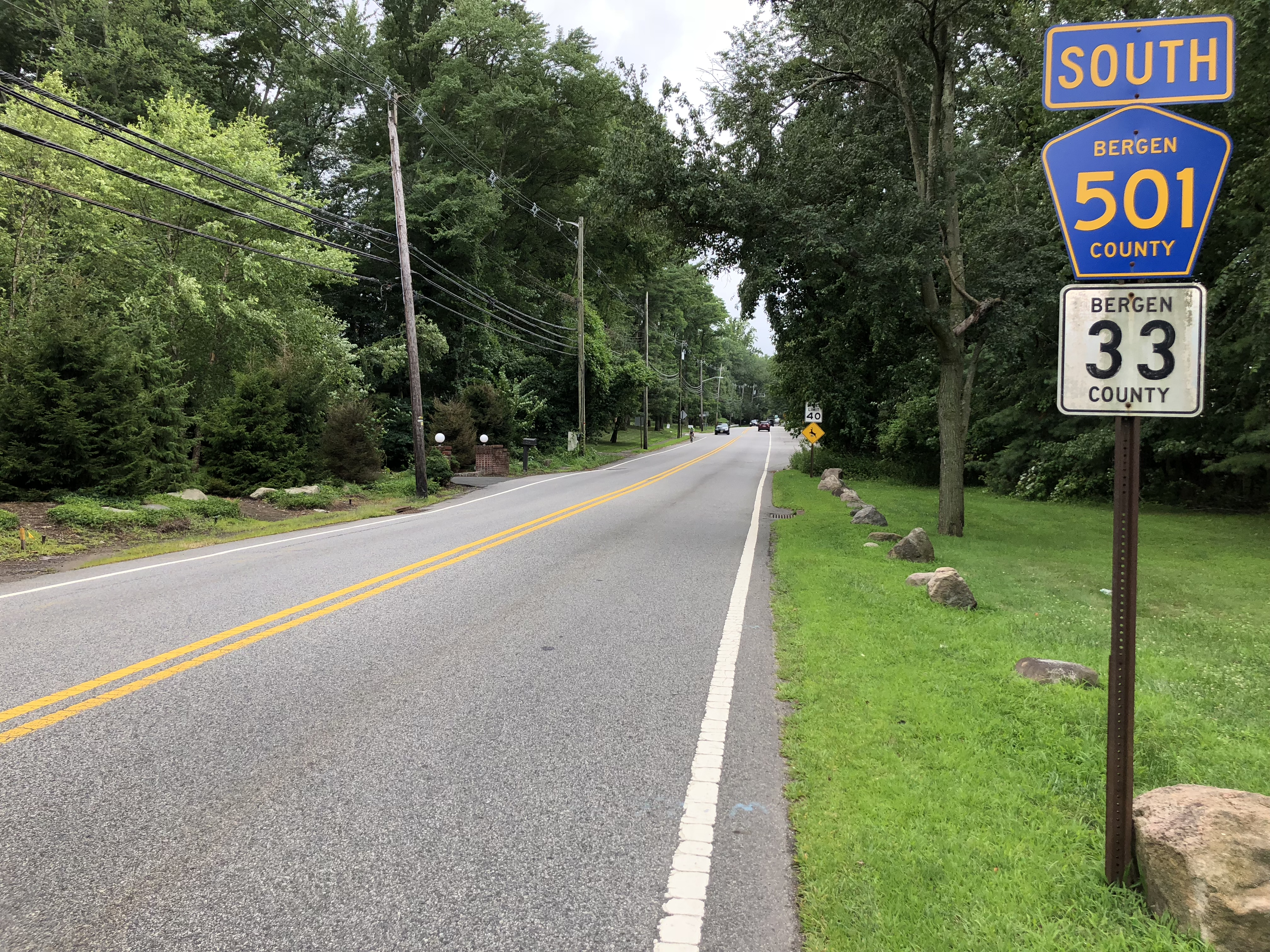
County Route 501 in Norwood

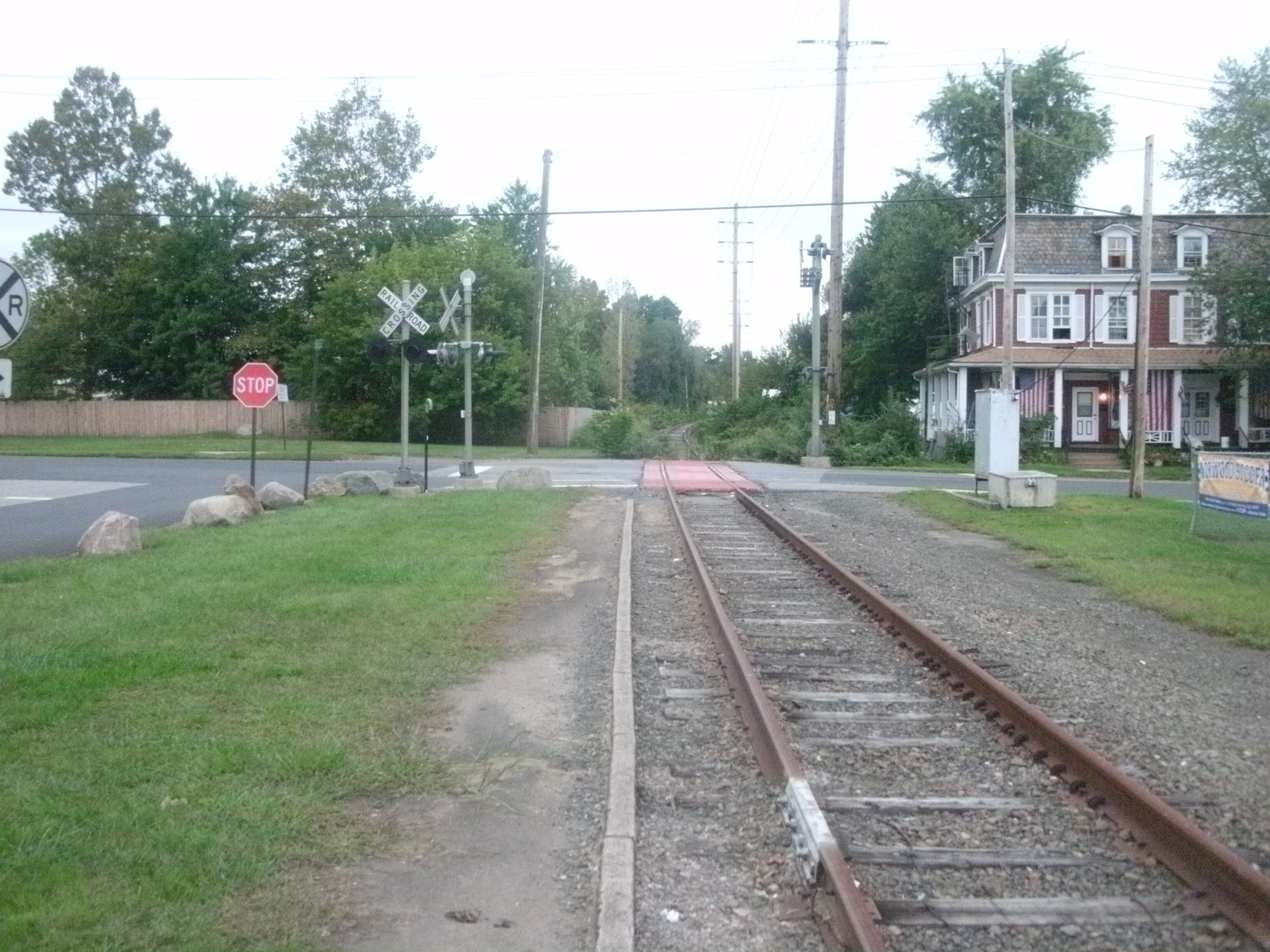
The site of the former Erie Railroad station in Norwood on September 11, 2011

=== Roads and highways ===
As of May 2010, the borough had a total of 25.31 miles (40.73 km) of roadways, of which 18.27 miles (29.40 km) were maintained by the municipality and 7.04 miles (11.33 km) by Bergen County.

CR 501 runs for about 1 mile (1.6 km) and CR 505 for about 1.3 miles (2.1 km) through Norwood.

=== Public transportation ===
Rockland Coaches provides service on routes 20/20T to the Port Authority Bus Terminal in New York City.

== Wildlife ==
The forests in Norwood house many deciduous species, sheltering deer, wild turkey, turtles, foxes, rabbits, and coyotes. Suburban sprawl is beginning to interfere with the wildlife. Deer and auto collisions as well as human interaction with coyotes have been an issue.

== Notable people ==
People who were born in, residents of, or otherwise closely associated with Norwood include:

- Kenny Anderson (born 1970), basketball player who began his NBA career with the New Jersey Nets
- Ray Barretto (1929–2006), percussionist and bandleader
- Colleen Broomall (born 1983), actress and journalist
- Devin Fuller (born 1994), wide receiver who played for the Atlanta Falcons of the National Football League
- Jordan Fuller (born 1998), American football safety for the Los Angeles Rams
- Bruce Harper (born 1955), former running back for the New York Jets
- Catfish Hunter (1946–1999), pitcher who played for the Kansas City / Oakland A's and New York Yankees
- Walter H. Jones (1912–1982), politician who served in the New Jersey Senate and was a candidate for Governor of New Jersey
- Don Mattingly (born 1961), manager of the Los Angeles Dodgers who lived in the borough while playing for the New York Yankees
- Bob McGrath (1932–2022), actor, singer, musician, and children's author best known for playing original human character Bob Johnson on the long-running educational television series Sesame Street.
- Frank Messina (born c. 1968), poet and author
- Gene Michael (1938–2017), former player, manager and executive in Major League Baseball
- Thurman Munson (1947–1979), former baseball player who played catcher for the New York Yankees
- Graig Nettles (born 1944), former baseball player who played third base for the New York Yankees
- Dianna Russini (born 1983), sports journalist on ESPN
- Julian Sanchez (born 1979), libertarian writer and journalist
- Pamela Redmond Satran (born 1953), author
- Anthony P. Vainieri (1927–2026), funeral director and politician who represented the 32nd Legislative District in the New Jersey General Assembly from 1984 to 1986
- Abi Varghese, director and writer, best known for his Netflix released show Brown Nation

== See also ==
- List of U.S. cities with significant Korean-American populations
- Chodae Community Church – By 2000, the congregation had grown to 700 members and the church sought approval from the borough for the construction of a $5 million, 47,000-square-foot (4,400 m^{2}) facility on a 7 acres (2.8 ha) site that would include a sanctuary large enough to accommodate 720 worshipers. A local citizens group, the Norwood Civic Association was created to oppose church's plans, with more than one-third of all resident families joining the organization, which argued that the size of the proposed church would cause flooding and cause congestion on Sundays, given the proximity between the proposed site and the borough's athletic complex.

== Sources ==
- Municipal Incorporations of the State of New Jersey (according to Counties) prepared by the Division of Local Government, Department of the Treasury (New Jersey); December 1, 1958.
- Clayton, W. Woodford; and Nelson, William. History of Bergen and Passaic Counties, New Jersey, with Biographical Sketches of Many of its Pioneers and Prominent Men., Philadelphia: Everts and Peck, 1882.
- Harvey, Cornelius Burnham (ed.), Genealogical History of Hudson and Bergen Counties, New Jersey. New York: New Jersey Genealogical Publishing Co., 1900.
- Van Valen, James M. History of Bergen County, New Jersey. New York: New Jersey Publishing and Engraving Co., 1900.
- Westervelt, Frances A. (Frances Augusta), 1858–1942, History of Bergen County, New Jersey, 1630–1923, Lewis Historical Publishing Company, 1923.
