= Shine, Jesus, Shine =

Christian praise song by Graham Kendrick

"Shine, Jesus, Shine" (also known by its first line, "Lord, the Light of Your Love") is a Christian praise song written in 1987 by Graham Kendrick. In 2005, it was voted tenth in a survey of the United Kingdom's favourite hymns by viewers of the BBC's Songs of Praise programme.

Damian Thompson, editor-in-chief of the Catholic Herald, called "Shine, Jesus, Shine" "the most loathed of all happy-clappy hymns". Its chorus has been noted for its similarity to Neil Diamond's Sweet Caroline.

The song was sung by the children of Department of Social Welfare and Development staff and students from the Mary Immaculate Parish Special School at Villamor Air Base for the departure of Pope Francis from the Philippines on 19 January 2015. Its performance was meant to evoke World Youth 1995, which the Philippines hosted, as well as the visit of then-Pope John Paul II.
