= Clive Calver =

British Christian leader

- Born: 1949 (age 76–77)
- Education: London Bible College (now: London School of Theology)
- Occupation: Church leader
- Spouse: Ruth Kirby

Clive Calver (born 1949) is a British Evangelical Christian leader, teacher, author and international speaker.

== Biography ==
During the early 1970s, Calver founded and led the mission team "In the Name of Jesus", which included Graham Kendrick, Stephen Maxted, Steve and Cathy Coupe and Rob Buckridge. He went on to lead British Youth for Christ, and was involved in the Spring Harvest series of Christian Conferences.

Calver was the programme director of Billy Graham's Mission England before leading the Evangelical Alliance of the United Kingdom from 1983 to 1997. In the latter role, he was a major spokesperson for Evangelicals on both sides of the Atlantic. It was during that time that Calver and his commentaries on current issues were featured often on the BBC.

He has also appeared on ABC's Nightline, CNN and National Public Radio. He has written 20 books and has been published in many national and local print media.

From 2005 to 2016, he was the senior pastor of Walnut Hill Community Church in Bethel, Connecticut, USA. For seven years he was president of World Relief and he traveled around the world, ministering to the poor and networking with churches to follow after the teachings of Jesus Christ and bring help to those in need.

He married Ruth Kirby, daughter of Gilbert Kirby, the principal of London Bible College that both had attended. They married in a civil ceremony on 14 July 1972 (followed by a Christian ceremony the next day). He is the father of Gavin Calver, who took over as CEO of Evangelical Alliance on 1 October 2019.

== Works ==
- Sold Out: Taking the Lid Off Evangelism (1980) ISBN 0-551-00827-X
- With a Church Like This Who Needs Satan? (1981) ISBN 0-551-00898-9
- The Fight of Your Life (1986) by Clive Calver and Derek B. Copley ISBN 0-86065-355-2
- Growing Together (1986) by Ruth and Clive Calver ISBN 0-86065-432-X
- Where Truth and Justice Meet (1987) ISBN 0-340-41065-5
- He Brings Us Together (1987) ISBN 0-340-39609-1
- Thinking Clearly About the Truth (1995) ISBN 1-85424-289-X
- Together We Stand (1996) ISBN 0-340-64237-8
- The Holy Spirit: Transforming Us and Our World (2001) ISBN 1-85999-527-6
- (Series Editor) Prayer (Thinking Clearly Series) by John Woolmer and Clive Calver (2001) ISBN 0-8254-6022-0
- (Series Editor) The Uniqueness of Jesus (Thinking Clearly Series) by Chris Wright and Clive Calver (2002) ISBN 0-8254-6006-9
- (Series Editor) Great Commission (Thinking Clearly Series) by Rose Dowsett and Clive Calver (2002) ISBN 0-8254-6032-8
- Descending Like a Dove: The Truth About the Holy Spirit (2004) ISBN 1-59185-290-0
- Alive In the Spirit (2006) ISBN 1-59185-872-0
- On the Front Line: A Father and Son, 30 Years Apart, Debate What It Means to Live All Out for Jesus by Clive Calver and Gavin Calver (2007) ISBN 0-8254-6148-0
- Dying To Live: The Paradox of the Crucified Life (2009) ISBN 1-934068-80-2
