= Dwell Community Church =

Christian organization based in Columbus, Ohio

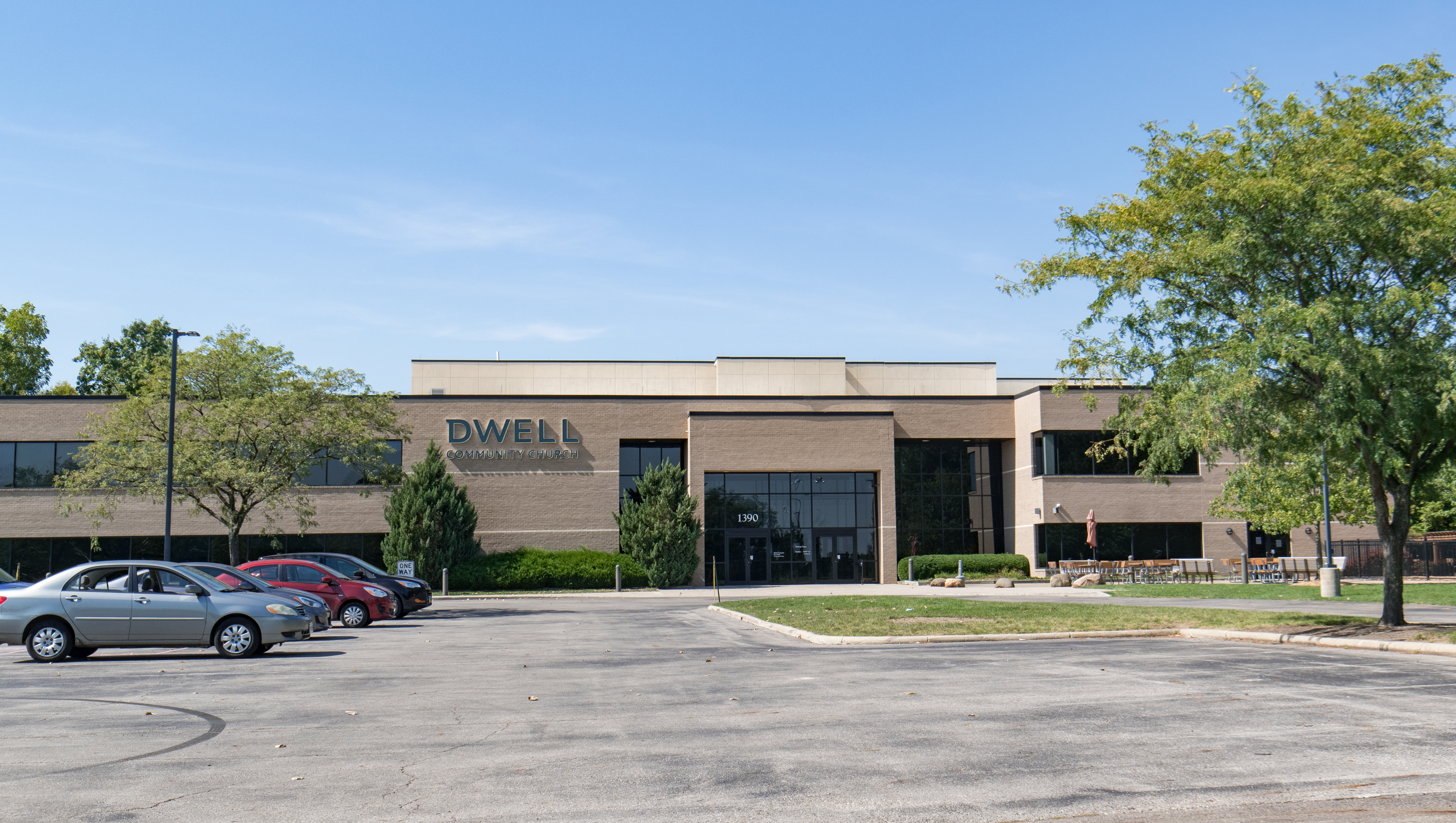
- Main building
- Primary church location
- 40.104919°N 82.955891°W
- Location: 1340 Community Park Drive, Columbus, Ohio
- Country: United States
- Denomination: Nondenominational evangelical

History
- Former name(s): Xenos Christian Fellowship, Fish Christian Fellowship
- Founded: 1970

Dwell Community Church, formerly Xenos Christian Fellowship, is a non-traditional, non-denominational, institutional cell church system. Unlike traditional churches, Dwell is centered on home church activities rather than traditional Sunday morning services. These small groups typically contain 15 to 60 members. Dwell also holds weekly multi-house church gatherings called central teachings. As of February 2009, Dwell has approximately 5,000 members and 300 home churches.

The church has been described by some as a cult, a label Dwell rejects. The church has faced allegations of abuse and control of its members.

== Name ==
The church was originally called Fish House Fellowship when founded in 1970. In 1982, the church adopted the name Xenos Christian Fellowship, with Xenos meaning "stranger" or "alien" in ancient Greek. According to church literature, the primary use of the name Xenos in the New Testament denotes sojourners in a foreign land, a biblical description of Christians whose ultimate home is in heaven. A secondary usage of the word Xenos denotes "one who provides hospitality."

In 2020, the organization changed its name to Dwell Community Church. Dwell said the name was aimed to better reflect the church, sound less antiquated, and be easier to pronounce. Critics said the name change was an attempt for the church to distance itself from allegations and controversy.

== History ==
Dwell originated as a Christian underground newspaper called "The Fish" first published in 1970 around the Ohio State University, in Columbus, Ohio, by brothers Dennis and Bruce McCallum. The newspaper sparked the formation of bible study groups around the university. Bible studies were conducted for several years at the "Fish House," a large campus-area residence where a group of OSU students lived. The group was known as "Fish House Fellowship" at the time. During this period, the leaders, Dennis McCallum and Gary Delashmutt, supported themselves as house painters, with some occasional help from fellowship members, under the name "Christian Brothers Painting". As the church grew, it was permitted to use at least two local churches for its central meetings, and eventually rented out large warehouse spaces located near Sinclair Road. Coincident with this growth, McCallum and Delashmutt quit house painting and were supported by church donations and pledges. The name "Xenos Christian Fellowship" was adopted in 1982. Up to 1991, home churches were allowed to act somewhat independently. Some members refused to accept the church hierarchy, and its interpretation of the Bible. Around 1,400 members left the church in this three-year church conflict. In February 2020, the church again took on a new name, Dwell Community Church.

The remaining leaders added accountability mechanisms and structures to standardize church doctrine and regulate house churches. House church leaders are required to meet biblical qualifications, the character qualifications given in I Timothy 3. Leaders are also trained in classroom settings and given examinations.

In 1991 Dwell launched Urban Concern, a Christian inner-city charity recognized by President George H. Bush in his "Thousand Points of Light" awards. Together with Columbus city government and business leaders, Dwell continues to expand Urban Concern and contributes the majority of its financial and volunteer resources. In 2007 Dwell constructed a Christian school and community center in the inner city. Dwell also provides two free clinics for the underprivileged in the Columbus area.

== Facilities ==
Dwell operates a study center near the Ohio State University campus, a site for students to read, study, and attend weekly church meetings.

=== Schools ===
Dwell runs three private schools and a highschool in the Columbus area: Dwell (pre-kindergarten), Calumet (pre-kindergarten–8th grade), and Harambee (pre-kindergarten–8th grade). The newest addition, Akili high school, opened in 2020. Akili boasts several features uncommonly found in area high schools, including strong emphasis on career, trade, and life readiness, as well as a satellite option for collegebound upperclassmen hosted on the Franklin University campus.

== Xenos Summer Institute ==
The Xenos Summer Institute was founded in 1996 as the Crossroads Project. It was originally a 9-day apologetics conference, but has since transformed into a 3-day conference regarding a broader scope of interests. Each year, one of the guest speakers hosts a course in conjunction with the conference that can be taken for college credit through Trinity Evangelical Divinity School. In 2013, there were 3,300 attendees at the conference.

== Criticism ==
Dwell has faced allegations of behavioral control, emotional abuse, and exploitation which critics claim constitute religious abuse. Named and anonymous ex-members have shared allegations. A former member of Dwell maintains a website titled "Xenos Is A Cult", which shares hundreds of allegations of controlling and cult-like behavior, including over 150 testimonials of abuse from parents, friends, and ex-members. Some stories date back to the 1980s. Rick Alan Ross, executive director of the Cult Education Institute, said the criticism of Dwell is significant and that older, larger Christian organizations have not faced the same negative criticism. SpiritWatch Ministries, a Christian organization that monitors spiritual abuse and cult-like activities, say the practices ex-members describe are comparable to cults.

Allegations include giving alcohol and tobacco to minors, overcrowded, dangerous and unhygienic conditions in church-organized shared living "ministry houses", lack of privacy, intimidation, financial abuse, gay conversion practices, love bombing, controlling member's medical decisions, shunning to include shunning members suffering mental illness and shunning ex-members who leave of their own volition, mishandling accusations of sexual abuse, shaming minors after their sexual information was extracted and shared with adults, time demands at the expense of school, work, and relationships with non-members, pressure to cut ties with friends and family outside the church, and other forms of abuse and control.

Dwell has denied allegations of religious abuse and labeled claims by former members as miscommunication or interpersonal conflict. Articles on the Dwell website written by the church's co-founder, Dennis McCallum, denies claims of abuse or toxic practices within the organization, stating that allegations are often motivated by hate or are exaggerated interpersonal conflicts.

=== Accountability Practices ===
Dwell's accountability system has led to members being removed from the church for not following what the church believes to be the teachings of the Bible. Some former members, such as former leader Ian Martin, call the practice of removal excommunication. Members who have been removed have expressed that they feel isolated from the community and shunned from within. While Dwell leaders publicly encouraged close and loving relationships with non-Christians, some Dwell members have felt while part of the church that they have been pressured to cut ties from "non-Christian" friends and family members. Dwell leadership claims many of the teachings of the church reflect a traditional interpretation of Christianity, although some of the church's practices have been described by the media and prior members as being cult-like.
