= Granger Community Church =

- Granger Community Church
- 41°43′18″N 86°10′21″W
- Location: Granger, Indiana
- Country: United States
- Denomination: Non-Denominational
- Website: grangerchurch.com

History
- Founded: 1986
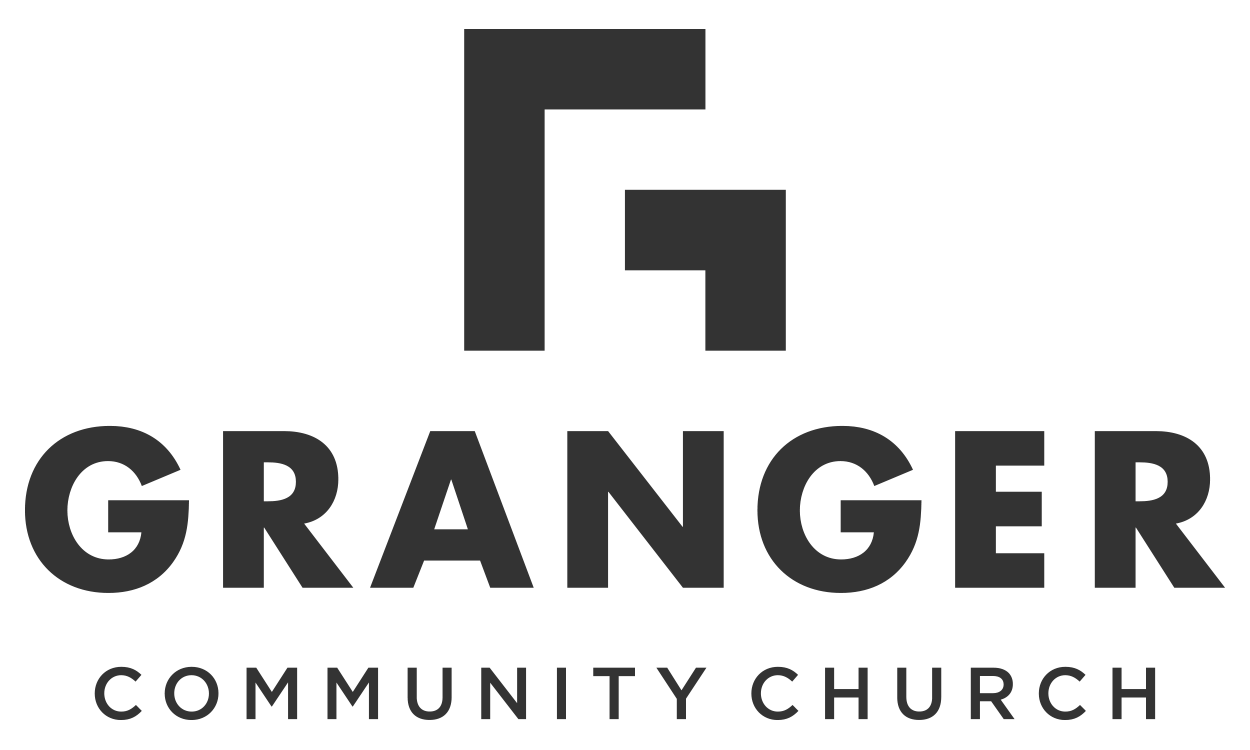

Granger Community Church is a non-denominational Evangelical multi-site megachurch based in Granger, Indiana.

== History ==
It was founded in 1986 as a United Methodist Church by Mark Beeson, his wife, Sheila, and a handful of others in the Beesons’ living room. Granger Community Church is a multi-site church. The Granger campus is located in Granger, Indiana; there is also a campus in Elkhart, Indiana.

Granger Community Church ranked 10th among United Methodist churches in the U.S. in attendance, according to 2018 statistics kept by the denomination's General Council on Finance and Administration. This multisite congregation had a pre-pandemic weekly worship attendance of around 4,000 people.

In July 2020, the Church left the United Methodist Church to be able to choose its own leadership.

== Pastors and Staff ==
In 1986, Mark Beeson and his wife, Sheila, started the church in their living room, with fewer than ten people. Their dream was to reach out to people who were not currently attending church, instead of pulling from other churches. Beeson earned his Bachelor of Science degree from Ball State University, his Master of Divinity degree from Christian Theological Seminary in Indianapolis, and his Doctor of Ministry degree in leadership development from United Theological Seminary in Trotwood, Ohio. Mark Beeson has openly shared about having pancreatic cancer and officially retired from The United Methodist Church on July 1. He remained pastor emeritus at Granger Community Church up until his death on December 17, 2020.

Church leaders have named Ted Bryant, who has held various staff positions, as the new pastor and Beeson's successor. United Methodist Church of Indiana released a statement as of July 12, 2020 that Granger Community Church disaffiliated from the denomination.

The church's Directional Leadership team consists of six staff members. Dr. Ted Bryant serves as the Lead Pastor, Josh King as the Pastor of Discipleship, John Keim as the Pastor of Kids and Students, Jami Ruth as the Communications Director, Dustin Maust as the Creative Director, and Dave Moore as the executive director of Operations.

== Activities ==
Granger Community Church hosts an annual food drop for the area of Michiana. As of 2020, they had completed 18 years of the Food Drop, which has impacted over 15 shelters and food pantries and nearly 6,300 families each year. Around 2,000 volunteers assemble to facilitate the event each year. Other events held at the church include #4Michiana, which is a community service event where hundreds come together to serve the community in different ways. The church hosts the Global Leadership Summit annually, a two-day simulcast joining with thousands of churches and organizations around the globe to hear from various leaders. They hold various other events for all ages, specifically for kids and students as well. These events include an annual children's day camp, middle school summer camp and a conference for student leaders. The church also has weekly Sunday gatherings for students with programming more suited for their age and stage of life.

Monroe Circle Community Center, also locally known as "MC3," is a ministry of Granger Community Church located in the City of South Bend. In 2005, MC3 purchased the Ko-Op 65 food pantry, and by 2007 they renovated and historically restored the building. As of 2016, the community center hosted 12 annual community-wide events. They attempt to promote community relationships through many different community service projects, including an annual Christmas store, food pantries, an Open Café, and creating a community garden. They also offer a financial literacy program and afterschool care for children called “Son City Kids”. These projects are made possible by volunteers who come together to connect with the needs of the population they serve.
