= Chodae Community Church =

Korean church in Norwood, New Jersey

Religion
- Affiliation: Korean Presbyterian Church Abroad
- Leadership: Reverend Chansub Park
- Year consecrated: 1986
- Status: Active

Location
- Location: 100 Rockland Ave, Norwood, NJ 07648 (Main); 119 Rockland Ave, Northvale, NJ 07647 (Educational)
- Interactive map of Chodae Community Church
- Coordinates: 41.001199°N 73.953686°W

Website
- Official website

Chodae Community Church, formerly called Cho Dae Presbyterian Church, is a Korean Presbyterian church located in Norwood, New Jersey, belonging to the Korean Presbyterian Church Abroad. The church, founded in 1986, has several different ministries catering to people of different cultures and languages. These include ministries catering to those who speak English, Japanese, and Korean. The church also caters to different generations ranging from toddlers to adults.

The church is headed by Reverend Kyusam Han. The church engages in missionary work to countries across the globe. The church also invests locally through the Norwood community.

The church owns its own building and include two sanctuaries, classrooms, a gymnasium, and a kitchen.

By 2000, the congregation had grown to 700 members and the church sought approval from the borough for the construction of a $5 million, 47,000-square-foot (4,400 m^{2}) facility on a 7-acre (2.8 ha) site that would include a sanctuary large enough to accommodate 720 worshipers. A local citizens group, the Norwood Civic Association was created to oppose church's plans, with more than one-third of all resident families joining the organization, which argued that the size of the proposed church would cause flooding and cause congestion on Sundays, given the proximity between the proposed site and the borough's athletic complex.
