= Columbus Community Church =

Historic church in New York, United States

- U.S. National Register of Historic Places
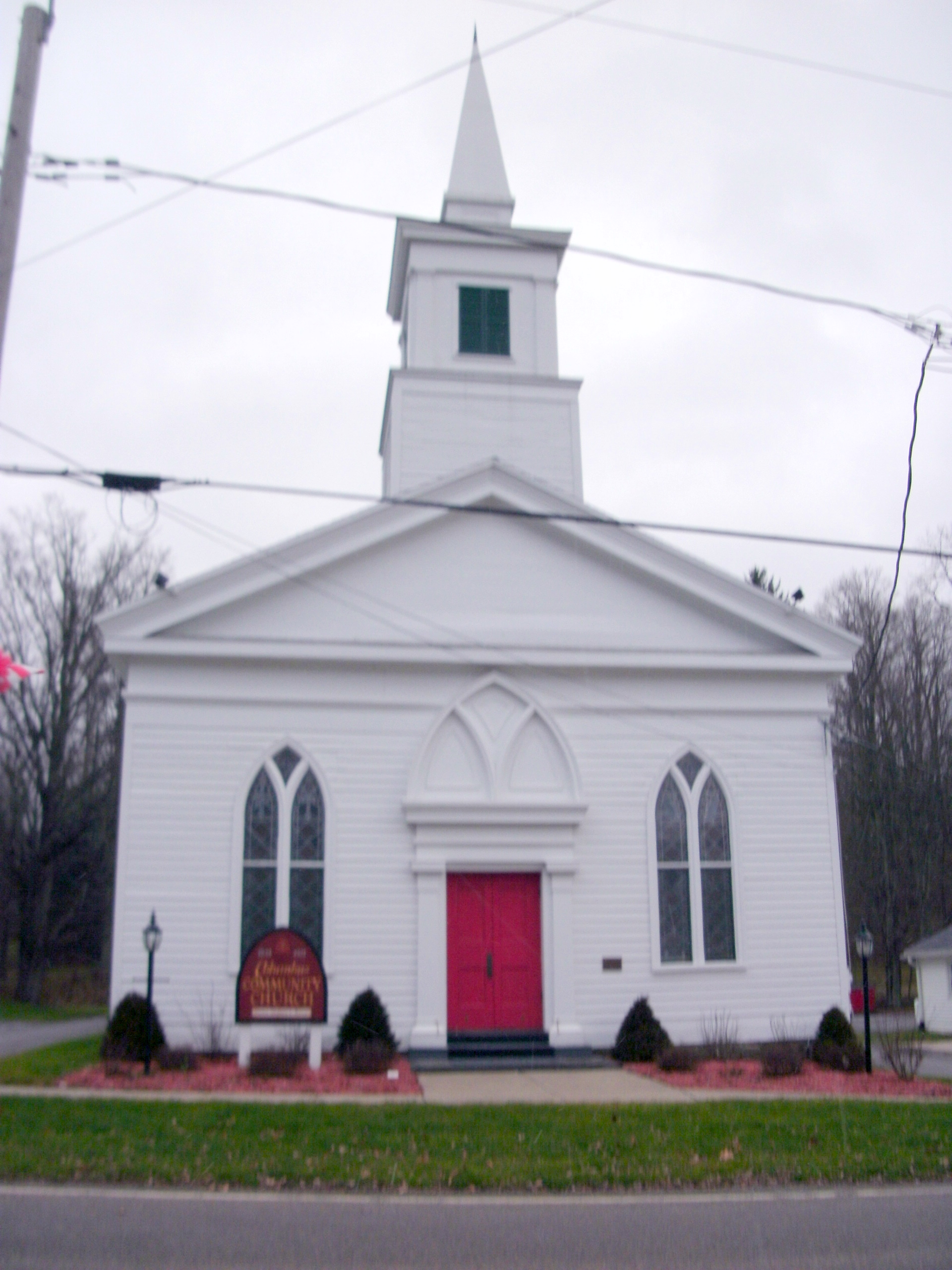
- Columbus Community Church, November 2010

- Location within New York Location within the United States
- Location: NY 80, Columbus, New York
- Coordinates: 42°41′1″N 75°22′24″W
- Area: 0.3 acres (0.12 ha)
- Built: 1844
- Architectural style: Greek Revival
- Website: columbuscommunitychurch.com
- NRHP reference No.: 86000487
- Added to NRHP: March 20, 1986

Columbus Community Church is a historic church on New York State Route 80 in Columbus, Chenango County, New York. It was built in 1844 and is a one-story rectangular frame building, a low pitched gable roof, and a three-stage bell tower and spire. It is in the Greek Revival style, with some Gothic Revival features introduced with a remodeling in 1879.

It was added to the National Register of Historic Places in 1986.
