= Longview Community Church =

Historic church in Washington, United States

- U.S. National Register of Historic Places
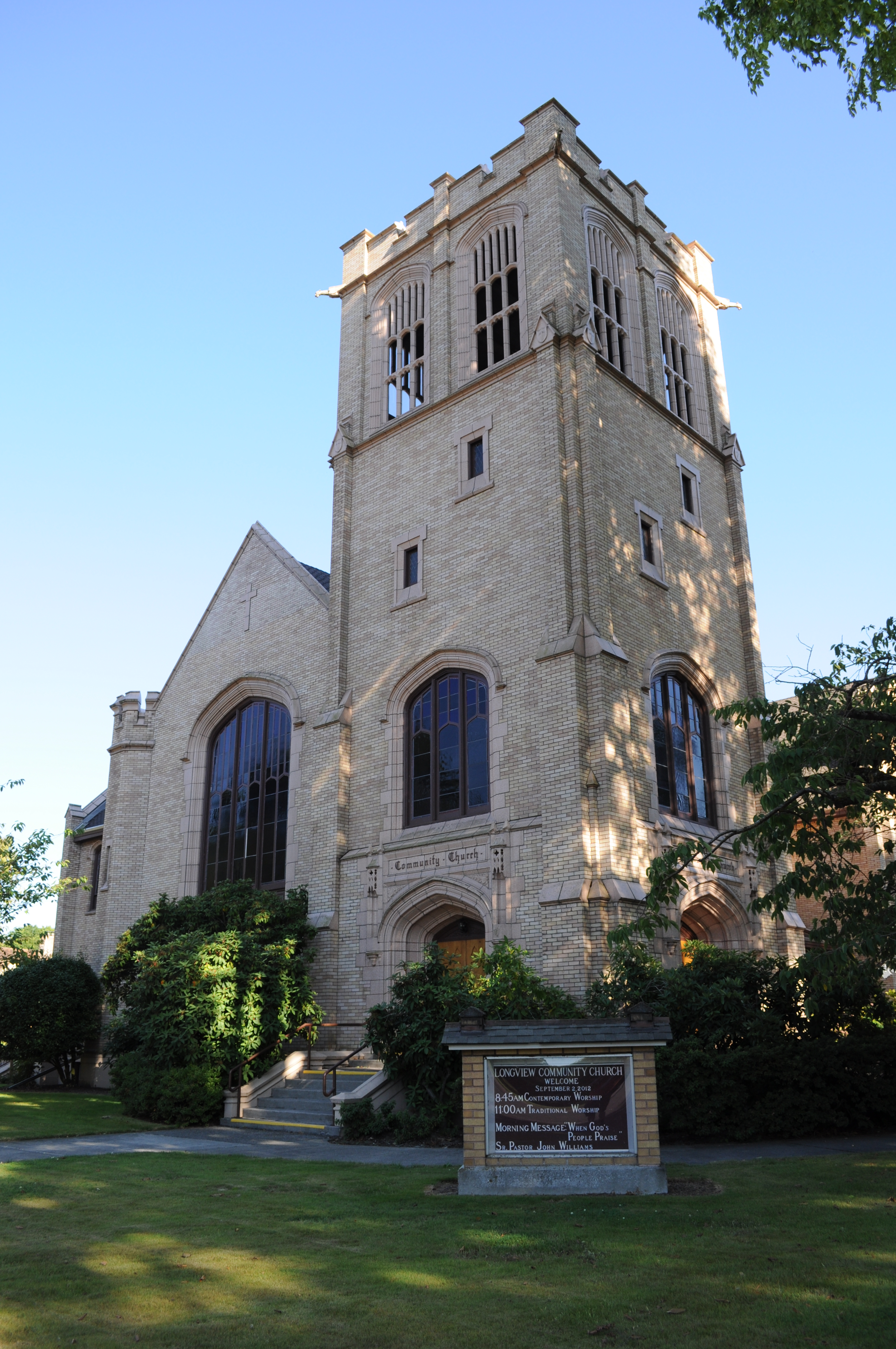

- Location within Washington (state)
- Location: 2323 Washington Way, Longview, Washington
- Coordinates: 46°8′3″N 122°56′55″W
- Area: 2 acres (0.81 ha)
- Built: 1925
- Architect: Copeland, H.L.; Clearman, Fred
- Architectural style: Gothic Revival
- MPS: Civic, Cultural, and Commercial Resources of Longview TR
- NRHP reference No.: 85003016
- Added to NRHP: December 5, 1985

Longview Community Church is a historic church at 2323 Washington Way in Longview, Washington.

It was built in 1925 and added to the National Register in 1985.
