= Walnut Hill Community Church =

Coordinates: 41.409031°N 73.382199°W

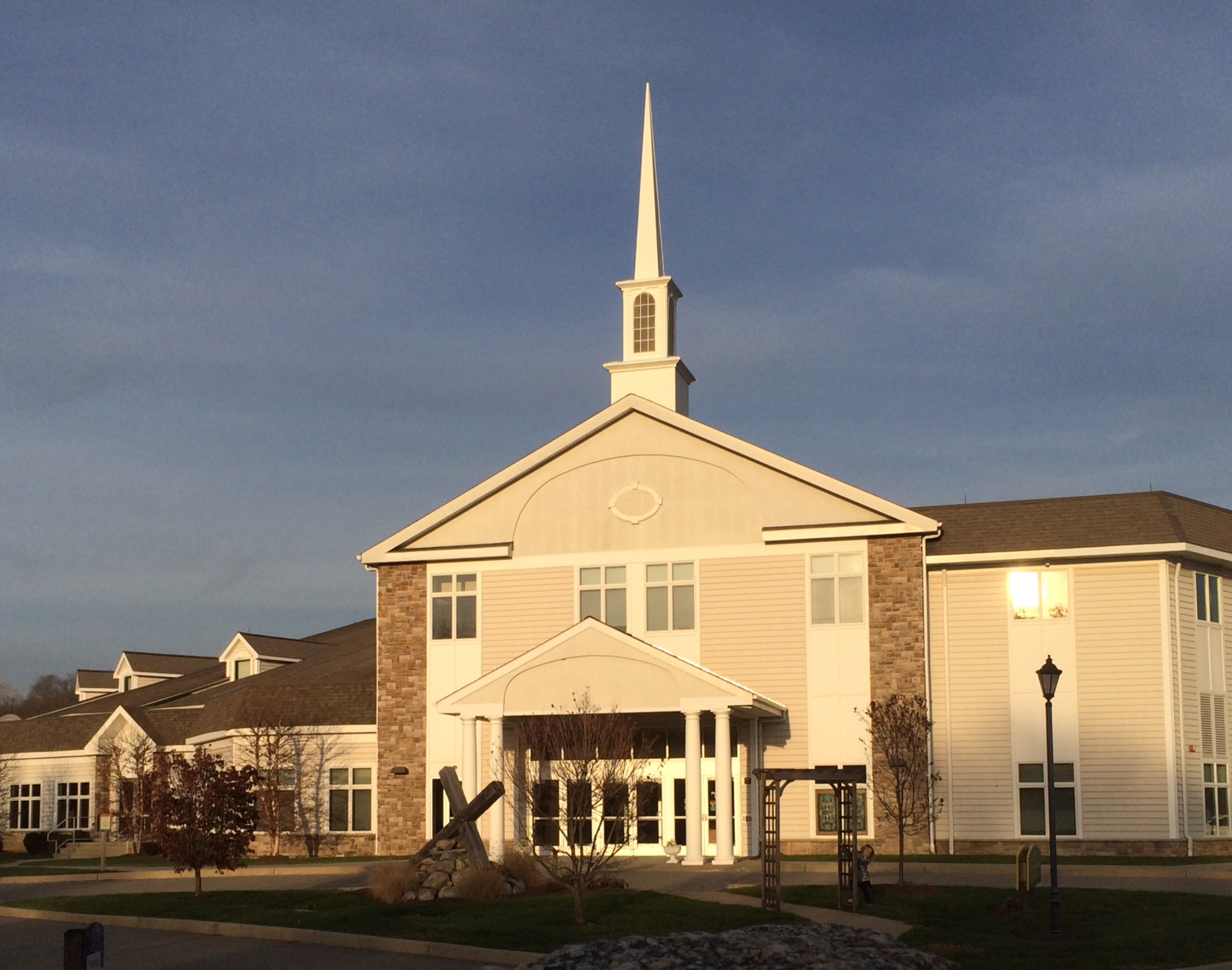
- Walnut Hill Community Church's Bethel Campus
- Walnut Hill Community Church
- Location: Connecticut
- Country: United States
- Denomination: Nondenominational
- Website: www.walnuthillcc.org

History
- Founded: February 7, 1982; 44 years ago

Clergy
- Pastor(s): Brian Bergen (Campus Pastor, New Milford); Joshua Multunas (Campus Pastor, Valley); Clarence Haynes (Interim Campus Pastor, Waterbury); Crystal Ellington (Campus Pastor, Online)

Walnut Hill Community Church is a nondenominational, evangelical multi-site megachurch based in Bethel, Connecticut.

== History ==
The church was founded in 1982 by a group of families that had begun meeting in a home.

In 2024, the weekly church attendance averaged 2,000. It is estimated that more than 4,000 people consider Walnut Hill home. Attendees come from a wide range of denominational and cultural backgrounds, giving the church a reputation for being warm and welcoming.

== Multi-campus church ==
As a multi-campus church, Walnut Hill Community Church functions as one church with many locations. Each campus location shares the same mission, vision and values, but expresses them in a way that is relevant and effective to its local community. The church communicates its purpose as "Igniting a passion for Jesus in Connecticut, New England and around the world" and invests its resources in providing biblical preaching, serving the local community, developing the next generation and building a strong sense of belonging among its congregation.

Campus locations can be found in Bethel, Derby, New Milford, and Waterbury and online. Additional campuses will be considered in the future.

== Team leadership ==
Walnut Hill operates under a team leadership model, with twp pastors—Adam DePasquale and Shawn Winters—collaborating as lead pastors. Together, they share the traditional responsibilities of a senior pastor while guiding and advancing key areas of the church's ministry.

== Walnut Hill worship ==
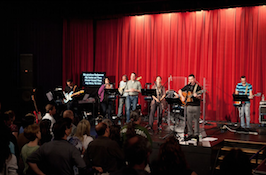
Live recording at the Strand Theater.

On June 12, 2011, Walnut Hill Community Church produced a live album entitled, "Revive Us: Songs of Prayer for New England." Recorded at the Strand Theater in Seymour, the evening was promoted as a live prayer and worship gathering as the church prepared to open its third campus. The album contains arrangements of hymns that have had influence in New England over the past few hundred years. Songs include Softly and Tenderly, My Faith Looks Up to Thee, Revive Us Again, I Surrender All and others.

Walnut Hill is continuing to write and release original songs, available on streaming platforms.

== Former senior pastors ==
- Craig Mowrey, 2016-2025 (Lead Pastor)
- Brian Mowrey, 2016–2023 (Lead Pastor)
- Clive Calver, 2005–2016
- Joel Eidsness, 1992–2005
- Interim Period, 1991–1992
- Doug Muraki, 1987–1991
- Bill Wheat, 1982–1987
