= Mission Community Church =

Church in Maricopa County, Arizona

Coordinates: 33.3521°N 111.6938°W

Mission Church
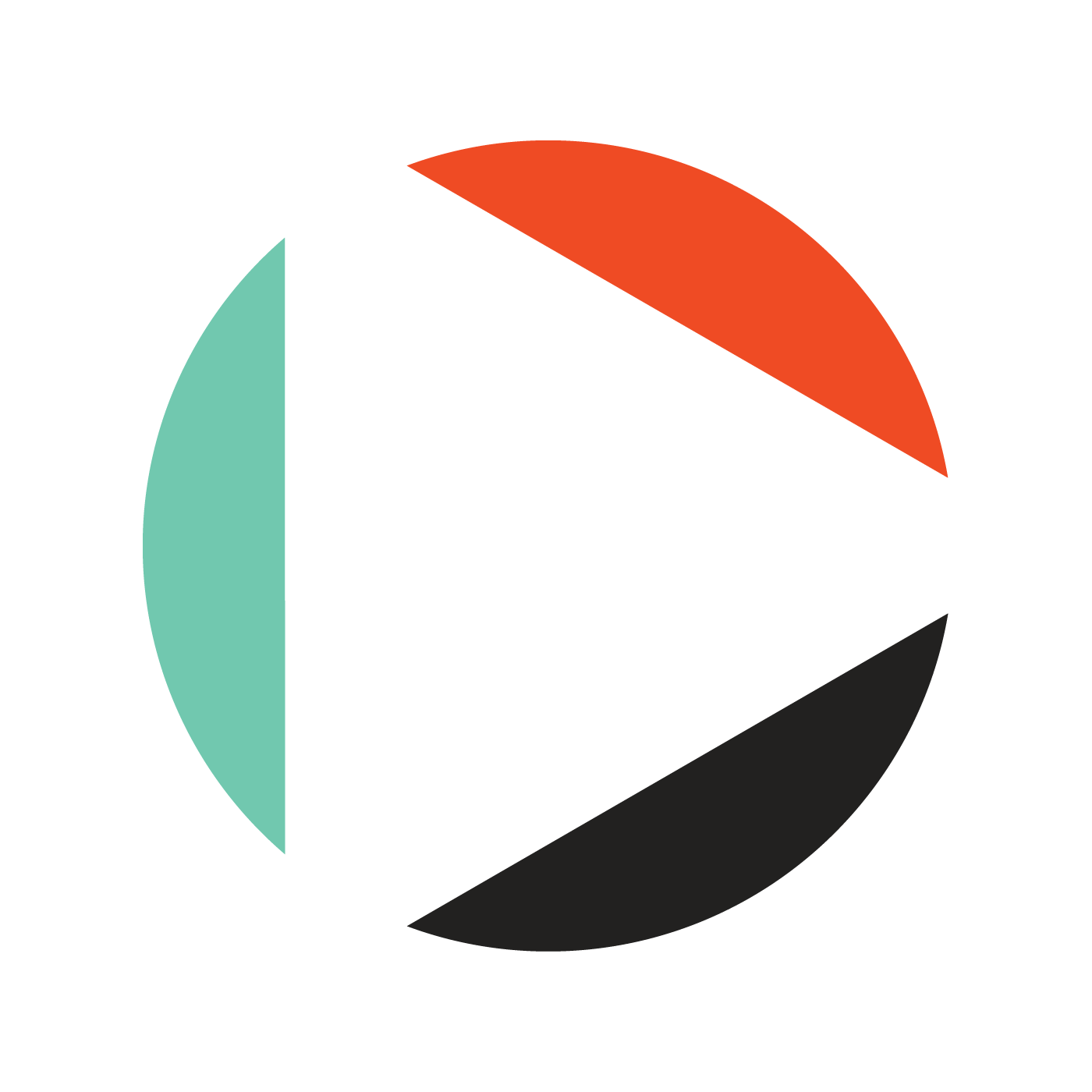
- Mission Church
- Location: Gilbert, Arizona
- Country: United States
- Denomination: Non-Denominational
- Website: www.missionaz.org

History
- Founded: October 1, 1995

Mission Church (formerly known as Superstition Springs Community Church) is an American non-denominational church located in Gilbert, Arizona.

== About ==
On October 1, 1995, the church, at the time known as Superstition Springs Community Church (SSCC), held its first public service in the cafeteria of Highland High School with its founding pastor Gary Norton.

In 1999 the church secured land for its future church home through Peter Esau. Gary Norton served as the pastor for 9 years. After 10 years of growth and momentum, SSCC moved onto its current property on Elliot Rd. in Gilbert.

In 2009, the church and its leadership decided to change the name to MISSION Community Church to better match its Gospel purpose. A year later, MISSION held the grand opening of its brand new worship center and campus facility.

In January 2014 lead pastor Mark Connelly was confronted in regard to extramarital affairs he was having with more than one female member of his congregation. His was requested to resign and he did. Gary Sutliff then became interim pastor.

Joel Thomas was announced as new Lead Pastor in November of that year.

The church hired Landon MacDonald as lead teaching pastor in September of 2022, despite allegations that he abused congregation members at his previous position as pastor at the Illinois church his father was the senior pastor. Landon allegedly verbally abused volunteers and failed to report the abuse of a minor which Illinois pastors are mandated to do by law. He resigned from the that church a few days after his father was forced out for bad behavior.

Currently, MISSION has around 2,500 people in attendance each weekend.
