= City Point Community Church =

- U.S. National Register of Historic Places
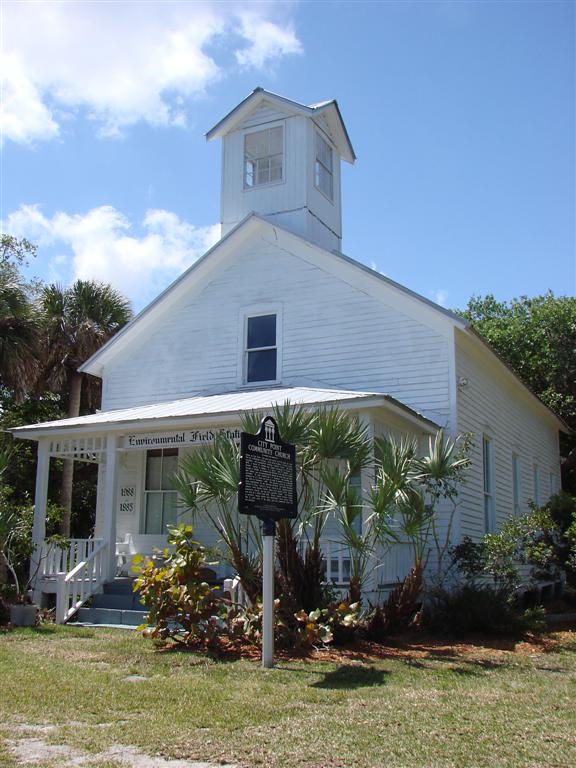

- Location within Florida Location within the United States
- Location: Cocoa, Florida
- Coordinates: 28°25′23″N 80°45′11″W
- NRHP reference No.: 95000731
- Added to NRHP: 20 June 1995

The City Point Community Church (also known as the Brevard County Environmental Field Station) is a historic church in Cocoa, Florida, United States. It is located at 3783 North Indian River Drive.

It was originally constructed as a public hall, school, and non-denominational church for both black and white residents. A five-person board of trustees was formed to act on this effort. The land was donated by J.C. Norwood. It was designed by board member A.L. Hatch and built by board member John M. Sanders, who completed the work on November 1, 1885. Other board members were William H. Sharpe, George W. Holmes, and George H. Chester. The structure served as the beginning congregation for several churches, including the United Methodist Church of Cocoa, Church of Christ, Church of God, Primitive Baptist Church, Calvin Baptist Church, Indian River Baptist Church, Baptist Enterprise Church, and the First Apostolic Temple. The building was used as a school until 1924. Picnics, dances, political rallies, a precinct voting station and observation tower during World War II were some of the uses the community found for the building.

On June 20, 1995, it was added to the U.S. National Register of Historic Places.
