= Watermark Community Church =

Coordinates: 32°55′22″N 96°46′41″W

- Watermark Community Church
- Location: Dallas, Texas
- Country: United States
- Denomination: Nondenominational
- Website: www.watermark.org

History
- Founded: November 7, 1999

Watermark Community Church is a nondenominational evangelical megachurch based in Dallas, Texas.

Watermark was founded in November 7, 1999 with an outward-focused ministry that sought to minister to "the unchurched, dechurched, dead-churched and unmoved."

Watermark averages about 9,000 weekly attendants. The Porch is a weekly young adult service that attracts between 3,000 and 4,000 attendants each Tuesday night.

Watermark is well known for its "Re:generation recovery" program. This is a 12-Step Christ-Centered recovery that is devoted to helping people find freedom from all struggles, including: anxiety/depression, pornography, fear, control, substance abuse, codependency, sexual abuse, same-sex attraction, eating disorders/body image, anger, obsessive thoughts, as well as any other struggle.

In April of 2021 founder Todd Wagner stepped down as Senior Pastor of Watermark.

== Church properties ==
Watermark Community Church has launched several new campuses over the last two decade, with the intention that these satellite campuses would eventually form into fully-functional independent churches.

=== Frisco ===
Watermark Frisco launched on July 7, 2019 and meets at Frisco High School in Frisco, TX.

In partnership with Centennial Community Church, Watermark Frisco launched as Onward Community Church to serve the Frisco community on September 12, 2021.

=== Fort Worth ===
A former campus in Fort Worth became an independent congregation on July 1, 2020 and maintains the name Watermark Fort Worth.

=== Plano ===
In 2014 Todd Wagner made a public announcement that the church was looking to expand to Plano. He further stated that the property they wished to purchase would cost $9.5 million. The Plano campus formally launched as an independent campus, CityBridge Community Church, on January 1, 2021.

=== Dallas ===
In 2015 it was announced that Watermark had the opportunity to purchase the second of two tower blocks adjacent to the main campus. The purchase was to be for $19 million, with $15 million needed as of October 10, 2015. As of 2016, Watermark has purchased an 8 year lease with plans to purchase the tower after the lease expires.

As of 2015 the Dallas Campus property was valued at $69.8 million.

In 2020 Watermark purchased the former Pearl C. Anderson Middle School property in South Dallas from the Dallas Independent School District for $211,000 in a public sale, an action which has upset church leaders in the community. Watermark intends to provide community services in the area, such as health care, job placement, and personal recovery.

== Doctrinal Positions ==
Watermark's full doctrinal statement is publicly available. Its official doctrinal position is consistent with evangelical, dispensationalist churches. A selected summary is given here.

- Verbal plenary inspiration of the Bible.
- Trinitarian.
- Cessationist.
- "Sanctification ... is positional, progressive, and ultimate."
- The Church is the community of all believers.
- "The local church is an assembly of professed believers for the purposes of worship, study of the Word of God, observance of the ordinances, Christian fellowship, equipping for and practice of Kingdom service, specifically stewarding our lives for the purpose of fulfilling the Great Commission."
- There are two ordinances: baptism and the Lord's Supper.
- Premillennial.

Watermark is an elder-governed church.

== Criticism ==
=== Membership ===
Under Watermark's governing documents, the church leadership may exercise "church discipline" up to and including terminating membership. Watermark's exercise of this clause has been criticized on at least one reported occasion:

- In 2016, Watermark terminated the membership of a man involved in a same-sex relationship.
