= Jupiter Inlet =

Inlet in Florida

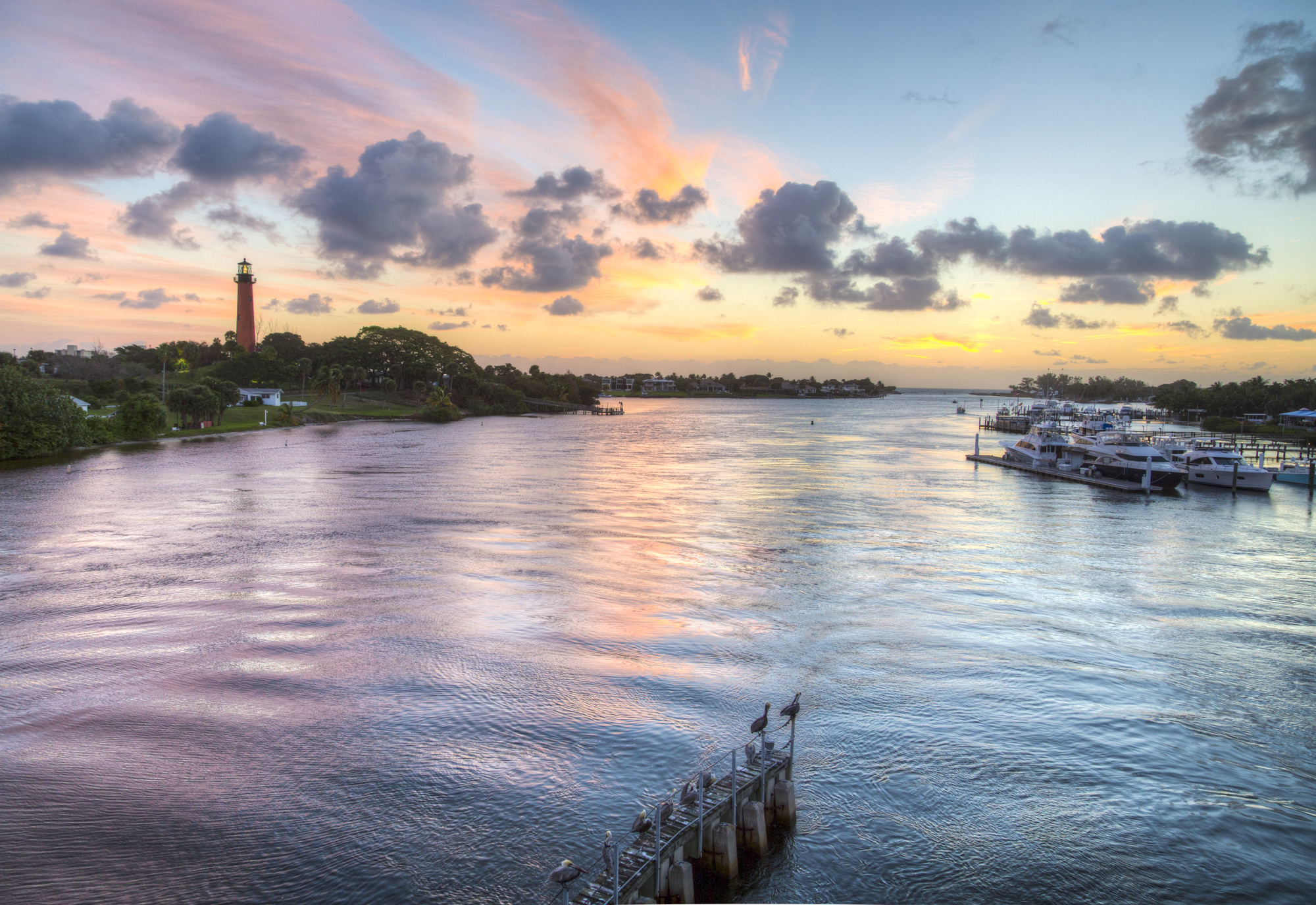
- View of Jupiter Inlet

- Location in Florida
- Interactive map of Jupiter Inlet
- Location: Palm Beach County; Martin County, Florida, United States
- Coordinates: 26°56′31″N 80°05′10″W
- Type: Natural tidal inlet
- Part of: Atlantic Ocean, Indian River Lagoon
- Primary inflows: Indian River Lagoon, Loxahatchee River
- Primary outflows: Atlantic Ocean
- Catchment area: 860 km^{2} (330 sq mi)
- Basin countries: United States
- Max. length: 0.5 mi (0.80 km) (mouth width)
- Max. width: 0.2 mi (0.32 km) (narrowest point)
- Average depth: 6 to 12 ft (1.8 to 3.7 m) (average)
- Max. depth: 20 ft (6.1 m) (dredged channels)
- Max. temperature: 30 °C (86 °F) in summer
- Min. temperature: 15 °C (59 °F) in winter
- Settlements: Jupiter, Florida
- Website: www.jupiterinletdistrict.org

The Jupiter Inlet is a natural opening through the barrier islands of Martin and Palm Beach counties in Jupiter, Florida, that connects the south end of the Indian River Lagoon and the Loxahatchee River to the Atlantic Ocean. It is one of the six primary inlets that provide exchange between the Indian River Lagoon System—a brackish estuarine complex extending along Florida’s east coast—and oceanic waters. The inlet allows tidal flow to regulate salinity levels in nearby estuaries, supports nutrient exchange, and provides a navigable waterway for marine vessels traveling between inland waters and the open sea. To the north of the inlet lies Jupiter Inlet Colony, a residential municipality situated on the southern tip of Jupiter Island. This area forms the base of the inlet's north jetty, a structure designed to control sediment and aid navigation.

On the southern side, a jetty constructed of concrete and artificial rock formations helps to mitigate coastal erosion and manage longshore sand transport. Adjacent to this jetty is DuBois Park, a county-managed public recreation area, along with the contiguous sandy beachfront of Jupiter, which extends approximately 3.4 miles south along the Atlantic coastline. The inlet's northern shoreline is marked by the Jupiter Inlet Lighthouse and Museum, a historic navigational landmark completed in 1860. It stands atop the Jupiter Ridge, a coastal elevation formed during the Pleistocene epoch, composed primarily of consolidated sand and shell-rich coquina limestone. This ridge provided a geologically stable foundation for the lighthouse and continues to shape the area's natural and cultural landscape.

== Description ==
Jupiter Inlet is a natural tidal inlet located between Palm Beach County and Martin County, Florida. It connects the Indian River Lagoon, the Loxahatchee River, and the Atlantic Ocean, facilitating the exchange of water between inland estuarine systems and the open sea. The inlet runs generally east to west, with a mouth approximately 0.5 miles wide, narrowing to about 0.2 miles at its most constricted point. Tidal activity at Jupiter Inlet is semidiurnal, producing two high and two low tides daily, with typical tidal ranges between 2 and 3 feet. These tides drive water movement and sediment transport throughout the inlet and the adjacent estuarine environments. The inlet is a vital navigational route for both recreational and commercial vessels accessing the Intracoastal Waterway, which parallels the Indian River Lagoon.

Navigability is maintained through regular dredging, with natural depths ranging from 6 to 12 feet and dredged channels reaching up to 20 feet, accommodating a variety of vessel sizes. However, shifting sandbars and strong tidal currents, particularly at the inlet’s narrowest points, require mariners to exercise caution. The regional climate is characterized by hot, humid summers, with average highs near 30 °C (86 °F), and mild winters, with average lows around 15 °C (59 °F). Summer months frequently experience afternoon thunderstorms, while winters are typically dry and temperate.

== Development and history ==
The region around Jupiter Inlet was originally inhabited by Indigenous peoples, notably the Jeaga, who settled in what is now Palm Beach County prior to European contact. Archaeological evidence, including shell middens and artifacts, provides data on the cultural practices and settlement patterns of these early inhabitants. The first European contact with the area occurred in the spring of 1519 when Spanish explorer Juan Ponce de León arrived with the galleons Santa Maria de la Consolacion and Santiago, leading to a violent engagement with the Jeaga people.

The Jupiter Inlet itself first appeared on maps as early as 1671 and was historically the sole outlet for waters from the Loxahatchee River, Lake Worth Creek, and the Jupiter Sound section of the St. Lucie River and Indian River systems. Over time, the inlet’s size was reduced due to the artificial development of the nearby St. Lucie Inlet, which altered the hydrodynamics of the river systems and necessitated the reduction of shoals to maintain a navigable channel.

In 1921, the Florida Legislature established the Jupiter Inlet District as an independent special district to oversee maintenance and ensure safe navigation through the inlet. The inlet’s north and south jetties were constructed shortly thereafter in 1922, initially extending 300 feet each and spaced 300 feet apart, with subsequent extensions in 1929 and rock ballast reinforcement by the early 1930s to provide stability against erosion. The inlet was temporarily closed from 1942 to 1947 due to concerns about German U-boat activity during World War II, impacting regional maritime traffic and defense preparations.

The Jupiter Inlet Lighthouse, designed by Lieutenant George Gordon Meade, was constructed in 1853 atop a hill believed to be an Indian shell midden on the north side of the inlet. It has since become a historic landmark and museum, managed by the Bureau of Land Management (BLM) and the National Park Service. Modern efforts to balance environmental protection with public access and navigation safety continue under the guidance of local and state authorities, including management and restoration plans developed by the Jupiter Inlet District and the Florida Department of Environmental Protection. The Jupiter Inlet Lighthouse, which has guided mariners since its first illumination in 1860, remains active as of 2025.

Ongoing scientific surveys, such as those conducted by the United States Geological Survey and the South Florida Water Management District, monitor the physical, hydrological, and biological characteristics of the Loxahatchee River Estuary and Jupiter Inlet to inform conservation and development policies. These efforts serve support habitat preservation for native species while addressing coastal erosion and storm impact challenges common to southeastern Florida's coastline.

== Geology ==
Jupiter Inlet is situated on the Atlantic Coastal Ridge, a relict geomorphological feature running parallel to Florida's eastern shoreline. This ridge originated during the Pleistocene epoch and consists primarily of ancient sand dunes and coquina limestone—highly porous sedimentary rock formed from cemented shell fragments and coral debris. These consolidated dune ridges are particularly well-developed in the Jupiter area, where elevations rise sharply compared to adjacent low-lying wetlands. The bedrock beneath the inlet and surrounding uplands belongs to the Anastasia Formation, which extends from St. Augustine to Boca Raton and is composed of interbedded quartz sands, silts, and coquina. This formation plays a critical role in groundwater hydrology due to its porosity and permeability. The formation’s exposure at Jupiter Ridge provided a suitable foundation for the construction of the Jupiter Inlet Lighthouse in 1853, taking advantage of the elevated terrain for optimal visibility.

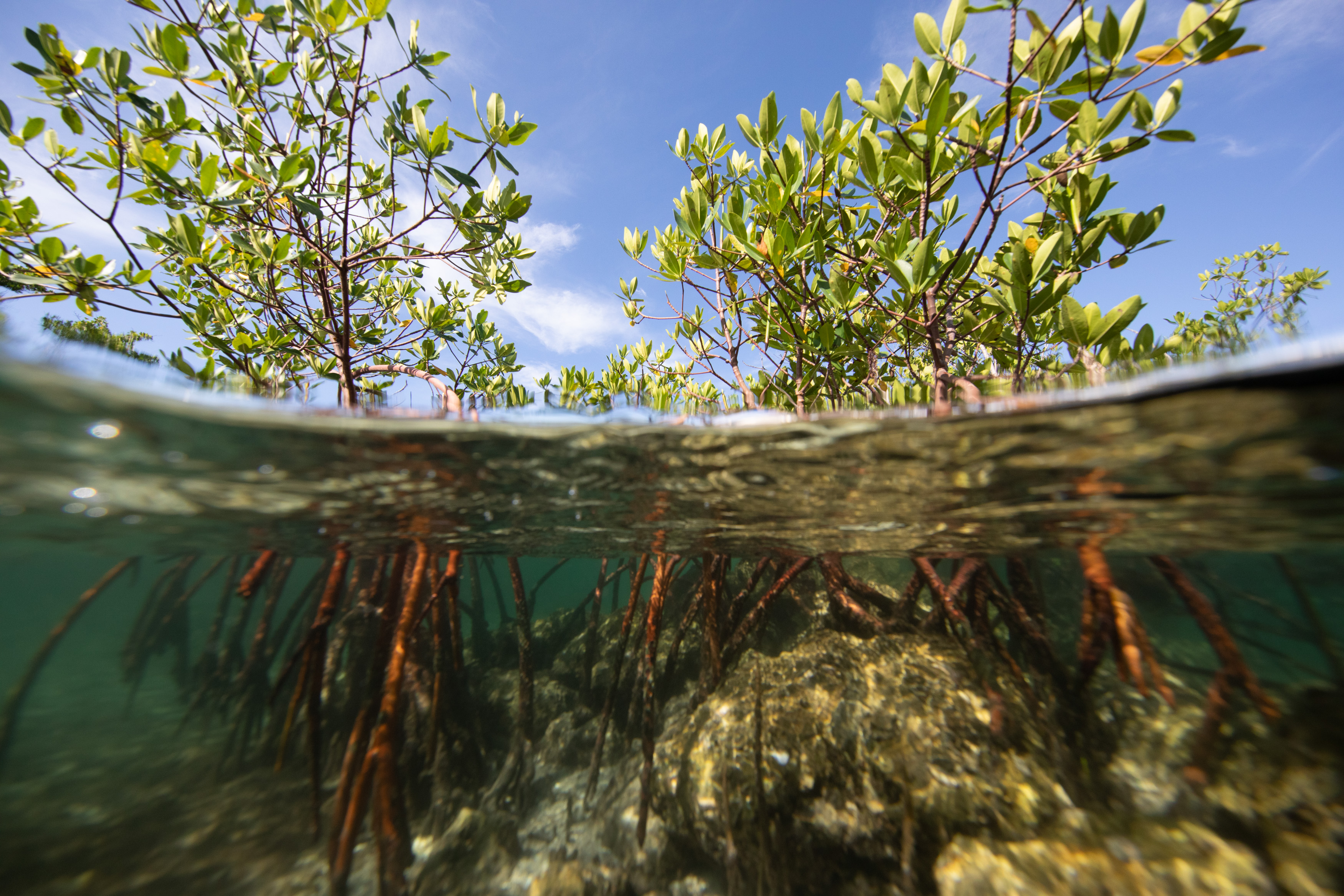
Underwater flora at the Jupiter Inlet Lighthouse Outstanding Natural Area

Sediment analysis in the Jupiter Inlet region reveals a high carbonate content, with some samples indicating shell and coral fragment concentrations of up to 95%, especially near offshore shoals and inlet margins. This sediment composition reflects both biological productivity and the area's geomorphic evolution under marine influence. The presence of coquina in surface and subsurface layers also affects erosion resistance, aiding in shoreline stability relative to more siliceous beaches to the north and south. Paleoenvironmental reconstructions from the Jupiter Inlet Historic and Archeological Site provide research into ancient coastal conditions. The diversity of molluscan species recovered from stratified layers—including freshwater, estuarine, and marine taxa—demonstrates historical sea level changes and transitions in salinity over time. These findings confirm that the inlet region has experienced alternating marine transgressions and regressions that shaped its geology, ecology, and human habitability across millennia.

== Ecology ==
=== Vegetation ===
The Jupiter Inlet region supports diverse plant communities typical of subtropical coastal ecosystems. Dominant among these are mangrove forests consisting primarily of red mangrove, black mangrove, and white mangrove. These species form dense root systems that stabilize shorelines by reducing erosion from tidal action and storm surge. Mangroves also function as critical nurseries for many fish and invertebrates, offering shelter and food resources. In addition, submerged aquatic vegetation such as shoal grass and turtle grass are fostered by the shallow, nutrient-rich waters of Jupiter Sound and the lower Loxahatchee River. These seagrass beds enhance water clarity, provide habitat and foraging grounds for herbivorous marine fauna like sea turtles and manatees, and contribute to overall ecosystem productivity through nutrient cycling.

=== Aquatic fauna ===
The estuarine and tidal habitats around Jupiter Inlet support a rich assemblage of fish species that are integral to both ecological balance and local fisheries. Common fish include snook, tarpon, sheepshead, and various juvenile groupers that utilize the mix of freshwater and saltwater environments for spawning ad nursery grounds. Oyster reefs scattered along the estuary act as natural biofilters, improving water quality by filtering suspended particles, while also providing structural habitat for crustaceans and benthic invertebrates. The surrounding wetlands and mudflats are frequented by numerous bird species, particularly wading and shorebirds. The great egret, roseate spoonbill, and little blue heron are common foragers in these areas, feeding on fish, crustaceans, and other small aquatic organisms. The inlet’s location along the Atlantic Flyway makes it a vital stopover point for migratory birds during spring and fall, adding to its importance as a biodiversity hotspot.

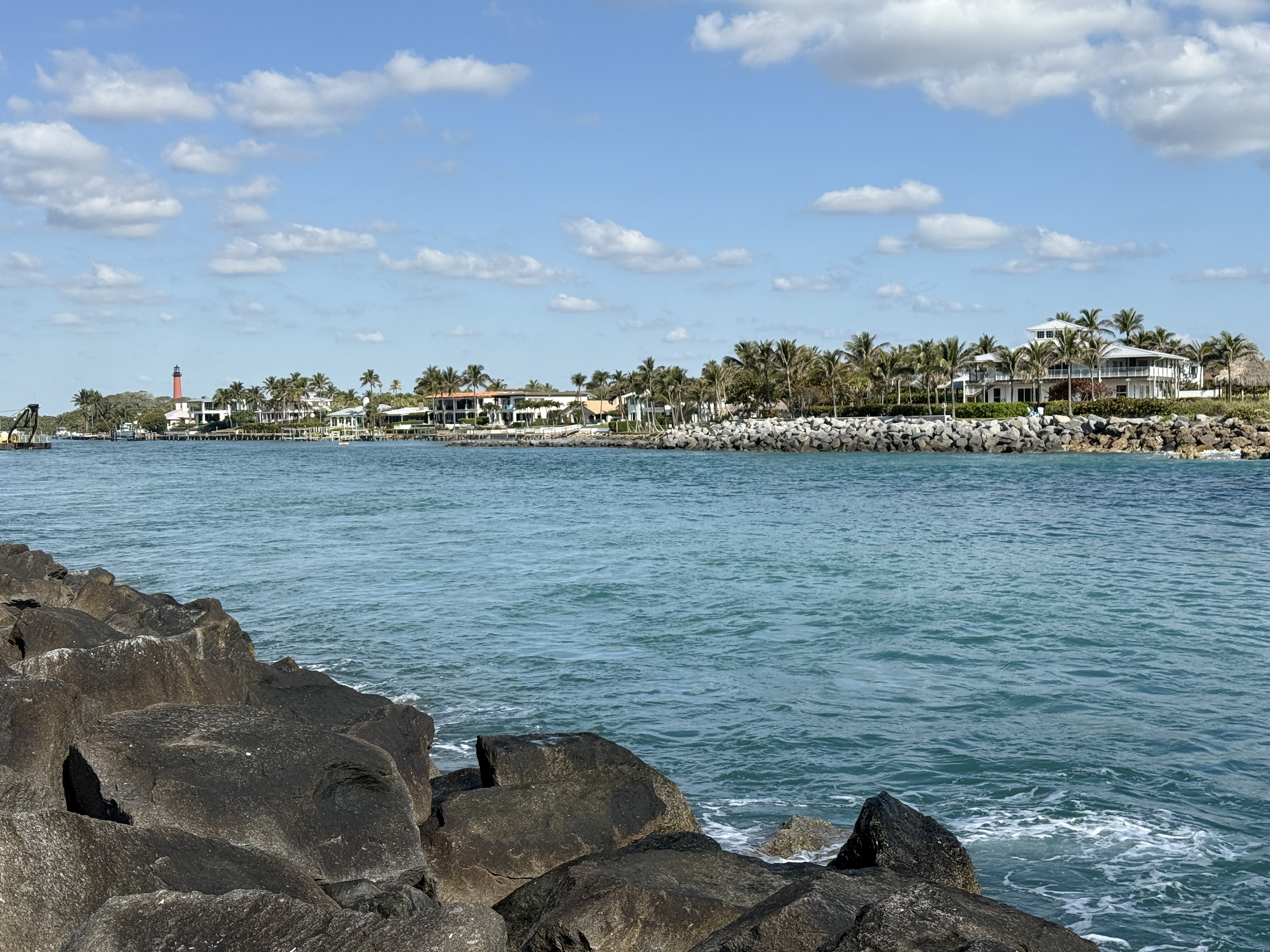
View of Jupiter Inlet from Dubois Park

=== Endangered species ===
Several federally protected species inhabit or regularly visit the Jupiter Inlet area. The West Indian manatee, classified as threatened under the Endangered Species Act, frequently uses the warm, shallow brackish waters of the inlet, especially in colder months when seeking refuge. Sea turtles, particularly juvenile green sea turtles and loggerheads, are commonly observed grazing on seagrass beds and are vulnerable to threats such as habitat degradation, marine debris, and boat strikes. Conservation efforts are centered around the 120-acre Jupiter Inlet Lighthouse Outstanding Natural Area, which preserves vital coastal habitats including mangrove thickets, scrublands, and tidal shorelines. Managed by the BLM, this area balances habitat protection with public access through interpretive trails and educational programs, fostering awareness and stewardship. Ongoing habitat restoration and invasive species control initiatives support the maintenance of native biodiversity and ecosystem health in the region.

== Parks and natural areas ==
=== Jupiter Inlet Lighthouse Outstanding Natural Area ===
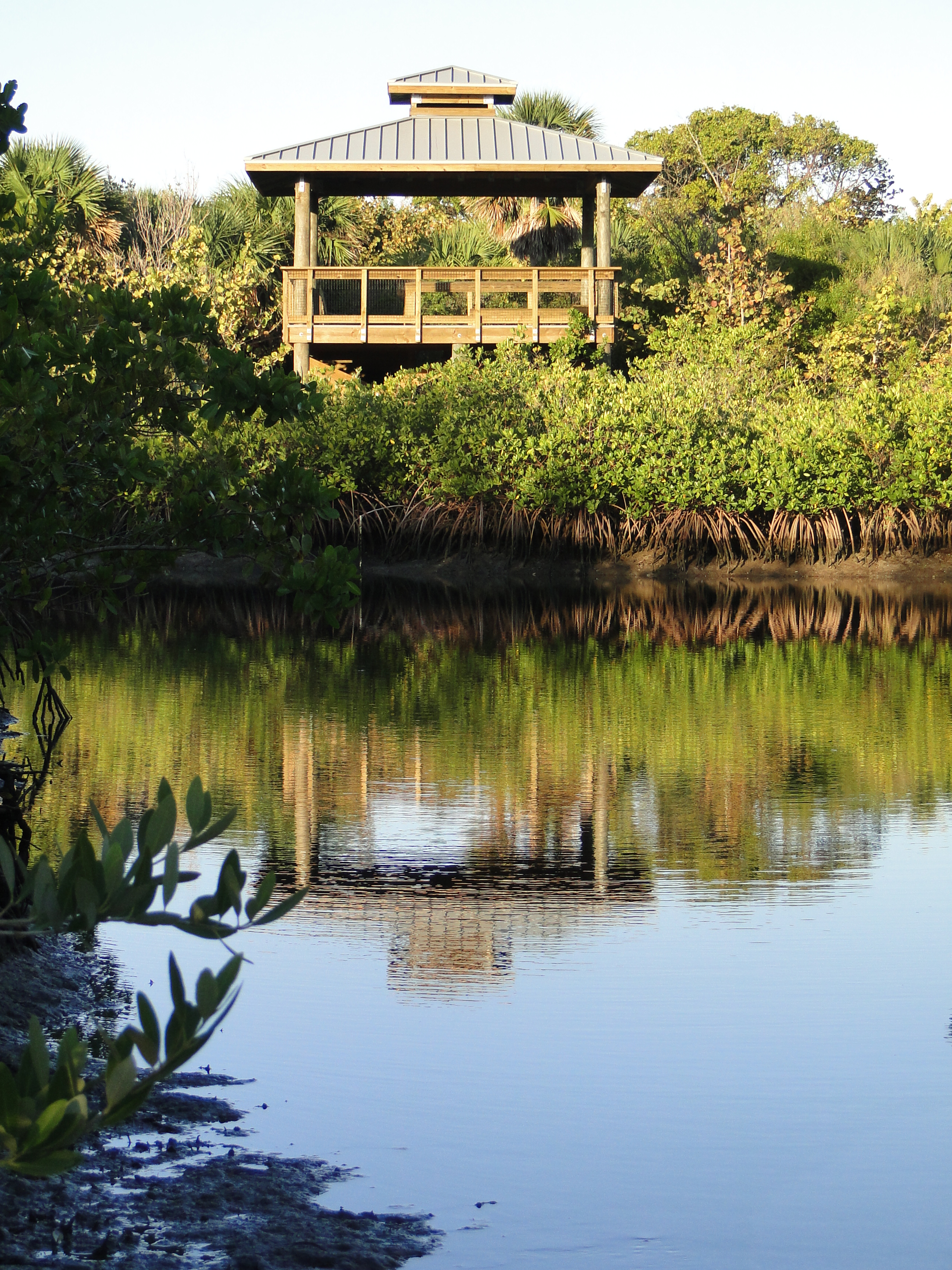
Jupiter Inlet Lighthouse Outstanding Natural Area

The Jupiter Inlet Lighthouse Outstanding Natural Area (ONA) encompasses approximately 120 acres and is managed by the BLM. Established in 2008, this area preserves a mosaic of habitats including tropical hardwood hammock, Florida scrub, and mangrove wetlands. These habitats support a variety of native plant and animal species, some of which are regionally significant. The site is also home to the historic Jupiter Inlet Lighthouse. Management efforts at the ONA prioritize habitat restoration, including the control of invasive species and the protection of native vegetation. Interpretive trails provide visitors with access to natural and cultural exhibits, enhancing public understanding of the area's ecological and historical importance.

=== DuBois Park and Historical Preservation ===
Located on the southern shore of the inlet, DuBois Park covers 18 acres and is operated by Palm Beach County. The park offers a range of recreational facilities such as swimming areas, snorkeling sites, picnic pavilions, and boat ramps, accommodating several visitor activities. Beyond its recreational role, the park is notable for the DuBois Pioneer Home, a structure built in 1898 and situated atop a prehistoric shell midden. This site provides valuable archaeological and historical research into Indigenous cultures as well as early European settlement in the region.

=== Regional parks and coastal access ===
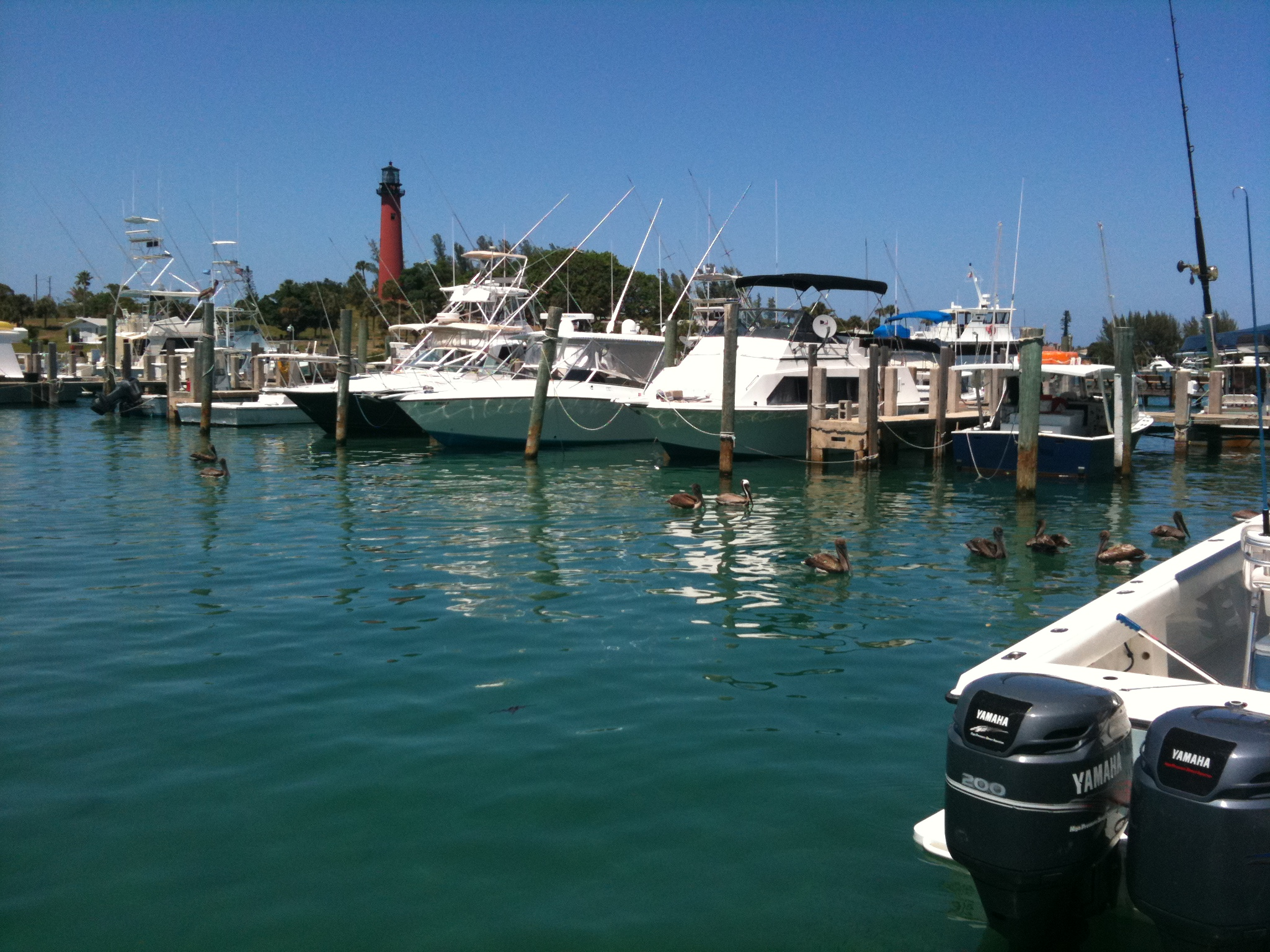
Boat docks

The broader Jupiter Inlet vicinity includes several regional parks that balance ecological preservation with public use. Carlin Park, located just south of the inlet, encompasses 120 acres of coastal environment. The park features dune restoration projects aimed at protecting native vegetation and critical sea turtle nesting habitats. Recreational amenities include beach access, athletic fields, picnic areas, and an amphitheater for community events. Coral Cove Park, situated to the north in the town of Tequesta, contains notable limestone outcroppings adjacent to a nearshore coral reef system. The park is used for snorkeling, diving, and fishing, with educational signage intended to promote awareness and conservation of the reef ecosystem. Additional protected areas such as the Jupiter Ridge Natural Area offer extensive natural habitats and recreational trails. Jupiter Ridge spans approximately 271 acres of Florida scrub and tidal swamp environments along the Atlantic Coastal Ridge, providing opportunities for hiking and nature observation.

== See also ==
- DuBios Park
- Indian River Lagoon
- Jupiter Inlet Light
- Loxahatchee River
