= Indian River Lagoon =

Three lagoons on the Atlantic Coast of Florida, United States

Coordinates: 28°03′19″N 80°34′34″W

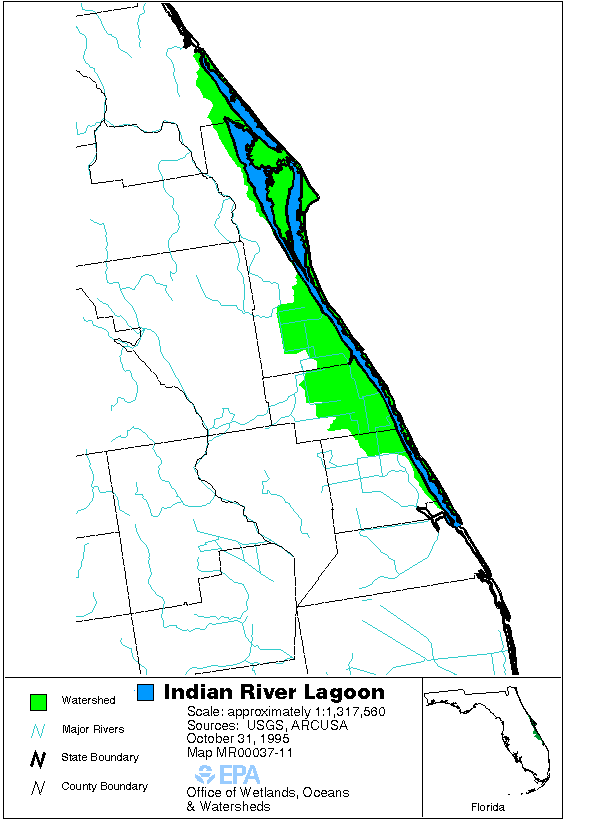
- Interactive map of Indian River Lagoon
- Location: Florida, United States
- Type: Lagoon
- Primary inflows: St. Lucie River
- Primary outflows: Fort Pierce Inlet, Jupiter Inlet, Ponce de León Inlet, Port Canaveral, St. Lucie Inlet, Sebastian Inlet
- Catchment area: 2,187.5 sq mi (5,666 km^{2})
- Max. length: 156 mi (251 km)
- Max. width: 5 mi (8.0 km)
- Average depth: 4 ft (1.2 m)
- Surface elevation: Sea level

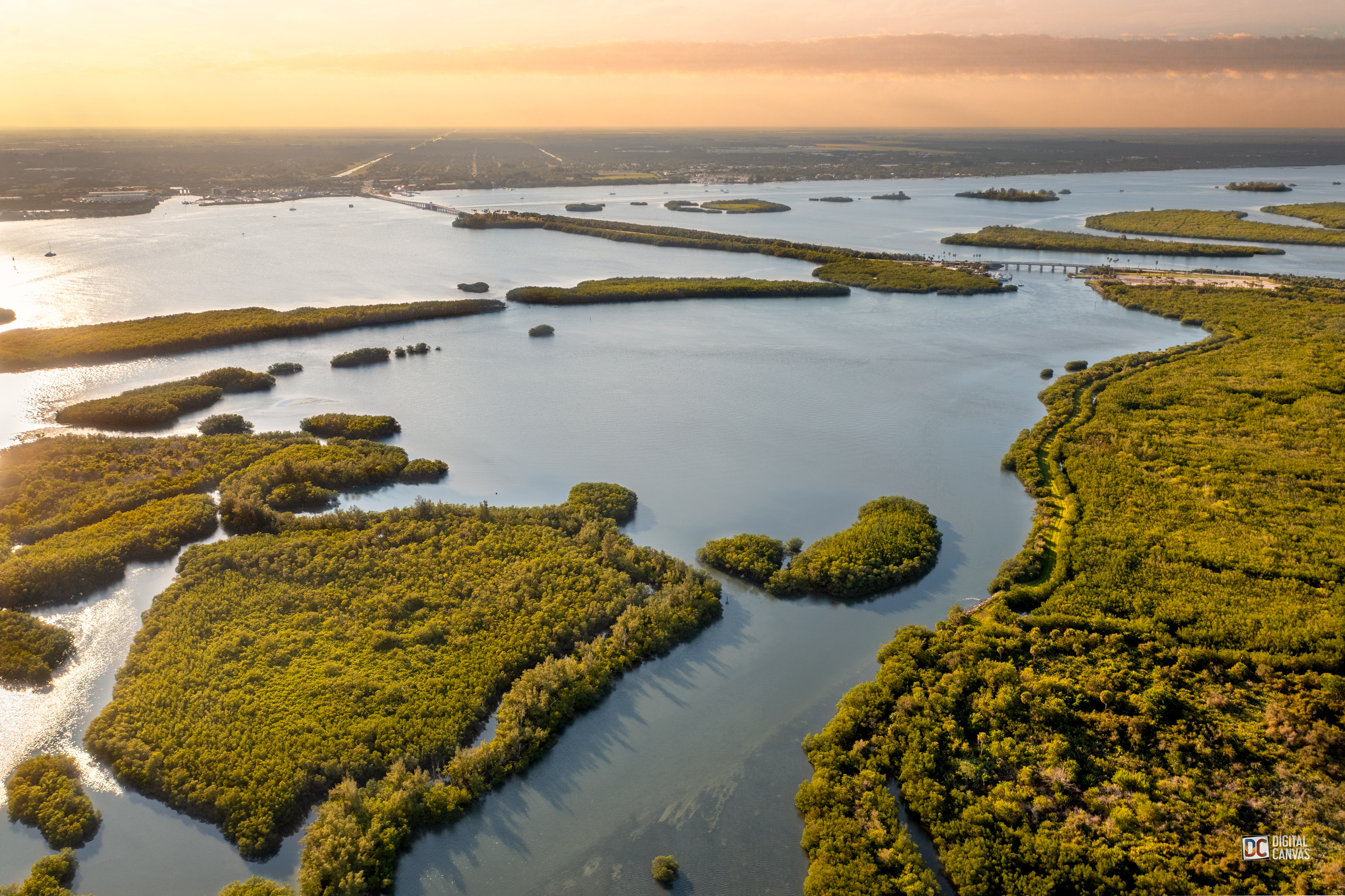
Aerial view of Indian River Lagoon

The Indian River Lagoon is a grouping of three lagoons: the Mosquito Lagoon, the Banana River, and the Indian River, on the Atlantic Coast of Florida; one of the most biodiverse estuaries in the Northern Hemisphere and is home to more than 4,300 species of plants and animals.

The Lagoon contains five state parks, four federal wildlife refuges and a national seashore. The Lagoon varies in width from 0.5 to 5 miles (0.80 to 8.05 km) and averages 4 feet (1.2 m) in depth.

== History ==
During glacial periods, the ocean receded. The area that is now the lagoon was grassland, 30 miles (48 km) from the beach. When the glaciers melted, the sea rose. The lagoon remained as captured water.

The indigenous people who lived along the lagoon thrived on its fish and shellfish. This was determined by analyzing the middens they left behind, piled with refuse from clams, oysters, and mussels.

The Indian River Lagoon was originally known on early Spanish maps as the Rio de Ais, after the Ais Indian tribe, who lived along the east coast of Florida. An expedition in 1605 by Alvero Mexia resulted in the mapping of most of the lagoon. Original place names on the map included Los Mosquitos (the Mosquito Lagoon and the Halifax River), Haulover (current Haulover Canal area), Ulumay Lagoon (Banana River) Rio d' Ais (North Indian River), and Pentoya Lagoon (Indian River Melbourne to Ft. Pierce)

Early European settlers drained the swamps to raise pineapples and citrus. They dug canals discharging fresh water into the lagoon, five times the historical volume.

Prior to the arrival of the railroad, the river was an essential transportation link.

In 1896 and 1902, there were fish kills in the lagoon from gas from the muck below. The advent of the automobile, starting in the 1930s, resulted in causeways which diverted the sluggish flow of the waterway. Huge population influx resulted in sewage, and stormwater runoff from roadways, polluting the lagoon.

From 1989 to 2013, the population along the lagoon increased 50% to 1.6 million people.

By 2018, millions of gallons of sewage were being dumped into the lagoon. To address sewage spills in the lagoon, in the Florida House of Representatives, Randy Fine advocated for providing $50 million per year in matching funds to upgrade lagoon sewage treatment facilities, and increasing the fines for illegal sewage discharges in the lagoon. A 2023 study by Florida Atlantic University’s Harbor Branch Oceanographic Institute found that human sewage released from septic systems was primarily to blame for poor environmental conditions in the lagoon. In 2024, federal District Judge Carlos Mendoza found that the defendant U.S. Environmental Protection Agency (EPA) and plaintiffs in a case before him agreed that the 2013 EPA water quality standards had not been achieved by Florida in the lagoon.

== Course ==
The full length of the Indian River Lagoon is 156 miles (251 km), extending from Ponce de León Inlet in Volusia County, Florida, to Jupiter Inlet in Palm Beach County, Florida, and includes Cape Canaveral. In 2016, the northern boundary was moved north-ward to Highbridge Road for management purposes. The Lagoon covers one-third of Florida's East Coast. Brevard County incorporates 71% of the lagoon's surface. Lake Okeechobee is connected to the lagoon by the Okeechobee Waterway and the St. Lucie River meeting in Sewall's Point.

From north to south, the Indian River Lagoon system includes the following:

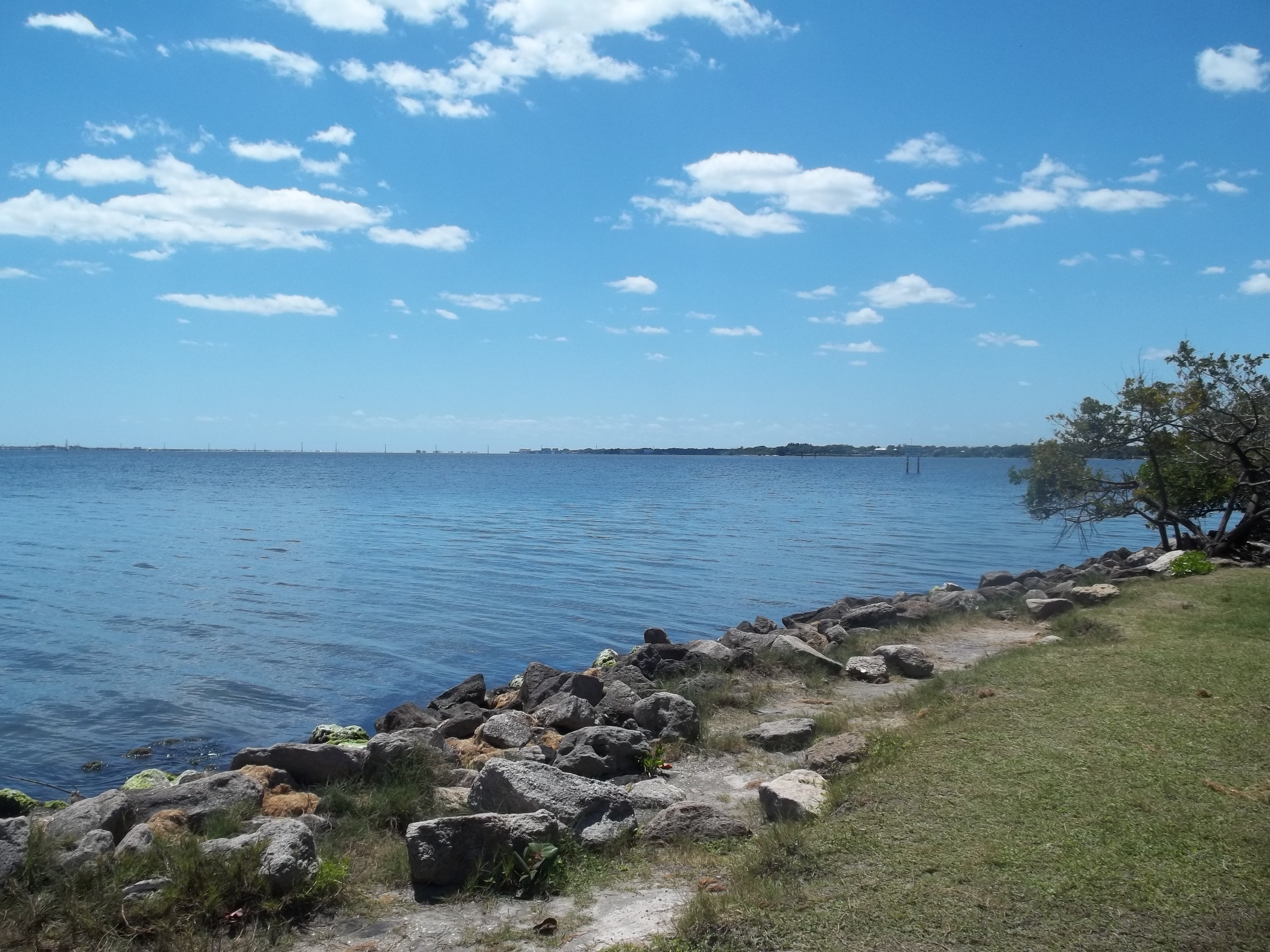
Indian River

- Mosquito Lagoon, from Ponce de Leon Inlet to the north end of Merritt Island, connected to Indian River by Haulover Canal.
- Indian River, the main body of water, from the north border between Volusia and Brevard Counties along the western shore of Merritt Island, southward to St. Lucie Inlet.
- Banana River, an offshoot of the Indian River, northward making up the eastern shore of Merritt Island.
- Eau Gallie River
- Crane Creek is a 3.3-mile (5.3 km) long tributary of the Indian River in Melbourne, Florida.
- Turkey Creek Sanctuary is a county wildlife reserve and nature trail system located along the shores of Turkey Creek. A tributary of the Indian River, in Palm Bay Florida.
- Turkey Creek (Indian River) is a tributary of the Indian River in Palm Bay Florida.
- St. Sebastian River
- Hobe Sound is the portion of the lagoon from St. Lucie Inlet to Jupiter Inlet.

For water quality measurement, the non-profit Marine Resources Council has divided the lagoon into four major divisions, with a total of ten subdivisions:

== Natural history ==
The Indian River Lagoon is North America's most diverse estuary, with more than 2,100 species of plants and 2,200 animals. The diversity is the result of being located near a climate boundary, 5 miles (8.0 km) from the Gulf Stream. Migratory ocean fish swimming nearby, were swept into the lagoon.

=== Fauna ===
The lagoon contains 35 species listed as threatened or endangered — more than any other estuary in North America. The lagoon has about 2,500 types of animals in it. It serves as a spawning and nursery ground for different species of oceanic and lagoon fish and shellfish. The lagoon also has one of the most diverse bird populations anywhere in America.

Nearly 1/3 of the nation's manatee population lives here or migrates through the Lagoon seasonally. There was a mass death of manatees in 2021 due to the loss of seagrass, caused by leaks from septic systems and overuse of fertilizers.

Nine-banded armadillos comprise one of the 34 mammals in the area. It is a 1920s immigrant from the Southwestern United States. In 2016 a Right whale with her calf entered the lagoon by mistake and safely exited to the ocean.

Between 200 and 800 Bottlenose dolphins (Tursiops truncatus) also live in the Indian River Lagoon. Red Drum, Spotted seatrout, Common snook, and the Tarpon are the main gamefish in the Titusville area of the lagoon system.

Avians include the American kestrel, Reddish egret and spoonbills. Butterflies include the Polydamas swallowtail.

Indian River Lagoon is abundant with bioluminescent dinoflagellates in the summer and ctenophore (comb jellies) in the winter.

=== Flora ===
Seagrass is a critical component to the overall health of the lagoon. By 1990, it had surpassed levels reached in 1943. The lagoon also contains night-blooming cereus.

95% of the seagrass, the main diet of manatees, disappeared by 2017 after an algae bloom fuelled by fertilizers. Seagrass again declined following Hurricane Ian and Nicole, with "virtually no detectable seagrass across the lagoon" by 2023. Seagress levels returned to stable levels, covering 4.3% of the lagoon, by January 2024.

== Protected areas ==
Government protected areas in and adjacent to the Indian River Lagoon include:

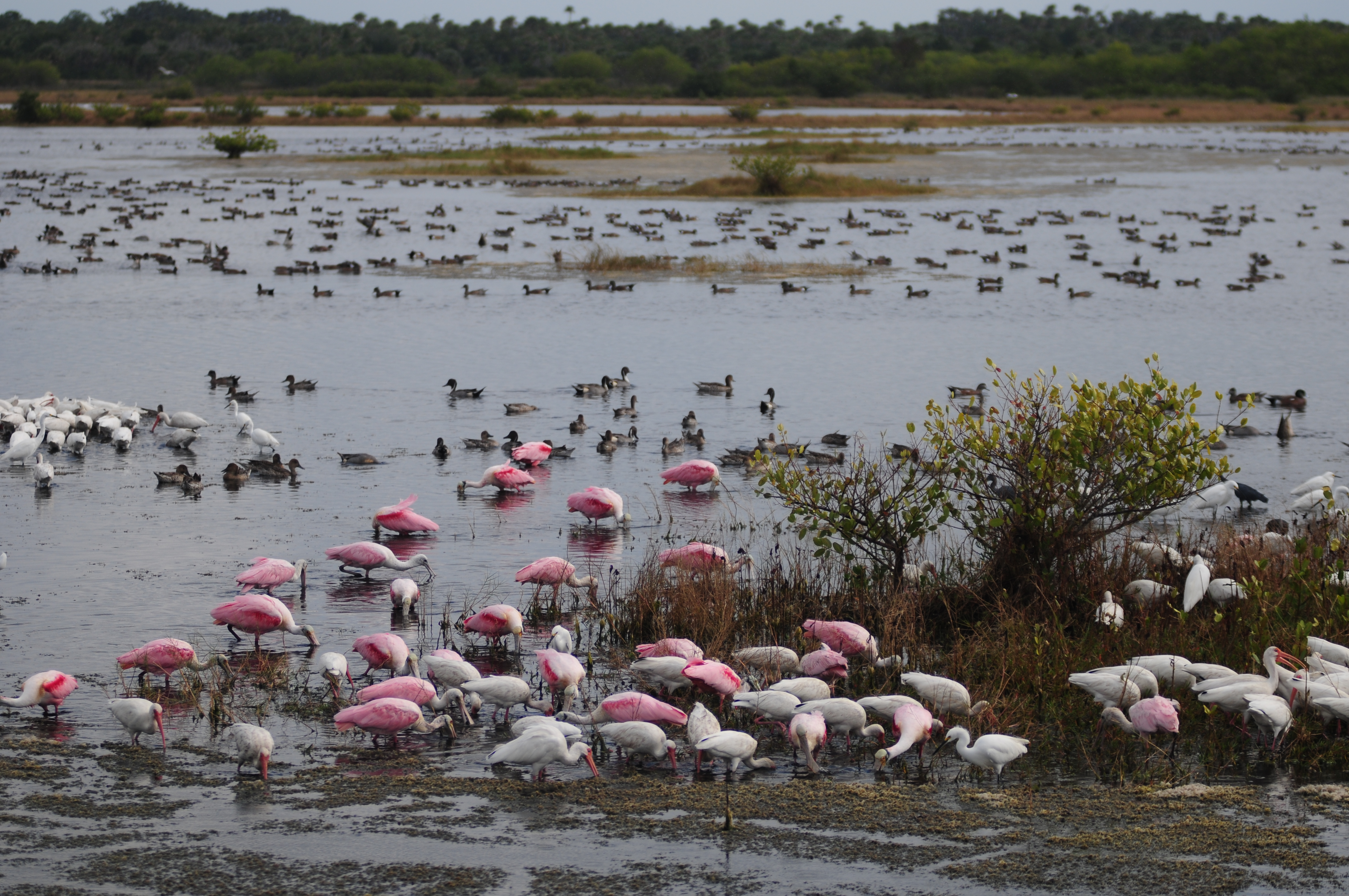
Ibises, roseate spoonbills, and egrets at Merritt Island National Wildlife Refuge

- Canaveral National Seashore
- Archie Carr National Wildlife Refuge
- Hobe Sound National Wildlife Refuge
- Merritt Island National Wildlife Refuge
- Pelican Island National Wildlife Refuge
- Avalon State Park
- St. Lucie Inlet Preserve State Park
- Savannas Preserve State Park
- Seabranch Preserve State Park
- Sebastian Inlet State Park

== Lagoon modifications ==
In 1916, the St. Lucie Canal (C-44) diverts excess nutrient-rich water from Lake Okeechobee into the South Lagoon. While this helps prevent life-threatening flooding in the Okeechobee area, it creates toxic blooms after entering the Lagoon, a threat to flora, fauna, and humans. This situation is proving difficult to address in the 21st century.

From 1913 to 2013, activity by humans has increased the watershed for the lagoon from 572,000 acres (231,000 ha) to 1,400,000 acres (570,000 ha) increasing runoff of freshwater and nutrients from farms. Both have been detrimental to lagoon health. The wetlands are needed to cleanse the lagoon. About 40,000 acres (16,000 ha) of land were lost to mosquito control and have been restored, but by 2013, recovery was incomplete.

Mangroves are important to marine life. Between the 1940s and 2013, 85% of them had been removed for housing development.

In 1990, the Florida Legislature passed the Indian River Lagoon Act, requiring most sewer plants to stop discharging into the lagoon by 1996. Some sports fish rebounded in population in the 1990s when gill nets were banned and pollution in the lagoon was reduced. In 1995 the seagrass covered over 100,000 acres (40,000 ha).

The 1993–1996 data base used to track the movement of water through the St. Lucie Estuary and into Indian River Lagoon is described in Smith (2007). This includes daily mean discharge rates for the 16 gauged canals emptying into the St. Lucie Estuary and Indian River Lagoon, predicted shelf tides, and wind speeds and directions recorded along the west side of the lagoon at about 27°32'N (corresponding to Segment 11 of the model).

In 2007, concerns were raised about the future of the lagoon system, especially in the southern half where frequent freshwater discharges seriously threatened water quality, decreasing the salinity needed by many fish species, and have contributed to large algae blooms promoted by water saturated with plant fertilizers. In the mid 1990s, the lagoon has been the subject of research on light penetration for photosynthesis in submerged aquatic vegetation.

In 2010, 3,300,000 pounds (1,500,000 kg) of nitrogen and 475,000 pounds (215,000 kg) of phosphorus entered the lagoon.

In 2011, a superbloom of phytoplankton resulted in the loss of 32,000 acres (13,000 ha) of lagoon seagrass. In 2012, a brown tide bloom fouled the northern lagoon. The county has approval for funds to investigate these unusual blooms to see if they can be prevented.

Catches of blue crabs dropped unevenly from 4,265,063 pounds (1,934,600 kg) in 1987 to 389,795 pounds (176,808 kg) in 2012, but with high catches in 1998, 1991, alternating with low catch years. These crabs require 2% salt content in the water to survive. A drought increases the salt content and heavy rainfall decreases it. Both of these conditions have recurred over the past decades and are believed to have had an adverse effect on the crab population.

In 2013, algae blooms and loss of sea grass destroyed all gains. In 2013, four major problems with lagoon water quality were identified. 1) Excess nitrogen and phosphorus from runoff from the application of fertilizer; 2) an estimated 8 to 11% septic tank failures of tens of thousands of septic tanks in the county. 3) Muck from construction, farming, erosion and dead plants find their way to the bottom of the lagoon, preventing growth and consuming vital oxygen essential to marine flora and fauna; 4) Invasive species, including the Asian green mussel, South American charru mussel, and the Australian spotted jellyfish, eat clams and fish larvae.

In 2016, there were an estimated 300,000 septic tanks in the five-county area bordering the Lagoon. At one time, sewer plants were worse polluters. In 1986, there were 46 sewer plants along the 156 miles (251 km) lagoon. They discharged about 55,000,000 US gallons (210,000,000 L; 46,000,000 imp gal) daily into the estuary. The state ended most sewer plant pollution by 1995.

The worst fish kill to date occurred in March 2016, with 30 species impacted. A brown tide bloom, caused by the algae species Aureoumbra lagunensis, was blamed for the low oxygen levels. The algae growth originated in the no-motor zone of the Merritt Island National Wildlife Refuge.

In 2018, lagoon health is better near ocean inlets. Pollution is worse in areas near no inlets, such as the Mosquito Lagoon, North IRL, and the Banana River.

== Economy ==
According to the Florida Oceanographic Society, nearly 1 million people live and work in the Indian River Lagoon region. The Lagoon accounts for $300 million in fisheries revenues, includes a $2.1 billion citrus industry, and generates more than $300 million in boat and marine sales annually. In 2007, visitors spent an estimated 3.2 million person-days in recreation on the lagoon.

In 2008, Hazen and Sawyer, P.C. submitted a report titled "Indian River Lagoon Economic Assessment and Analysis Update" to the Indian River Lagoon National Estuary Program, St. Johns River Water Management District. The report described the estimated 2007 recreational uses and economic value of the Indian River Lagoon to residents and visitors of the five counties that comprise the Lagoon system. The sum of recreational expenditures and recreational use value was estimated at $2.1 billion.

== See also ==
- Ballard Park
- Environmental issues in Brevard County
