= Jupiter Island =

Island in Martin County, Florida, United States

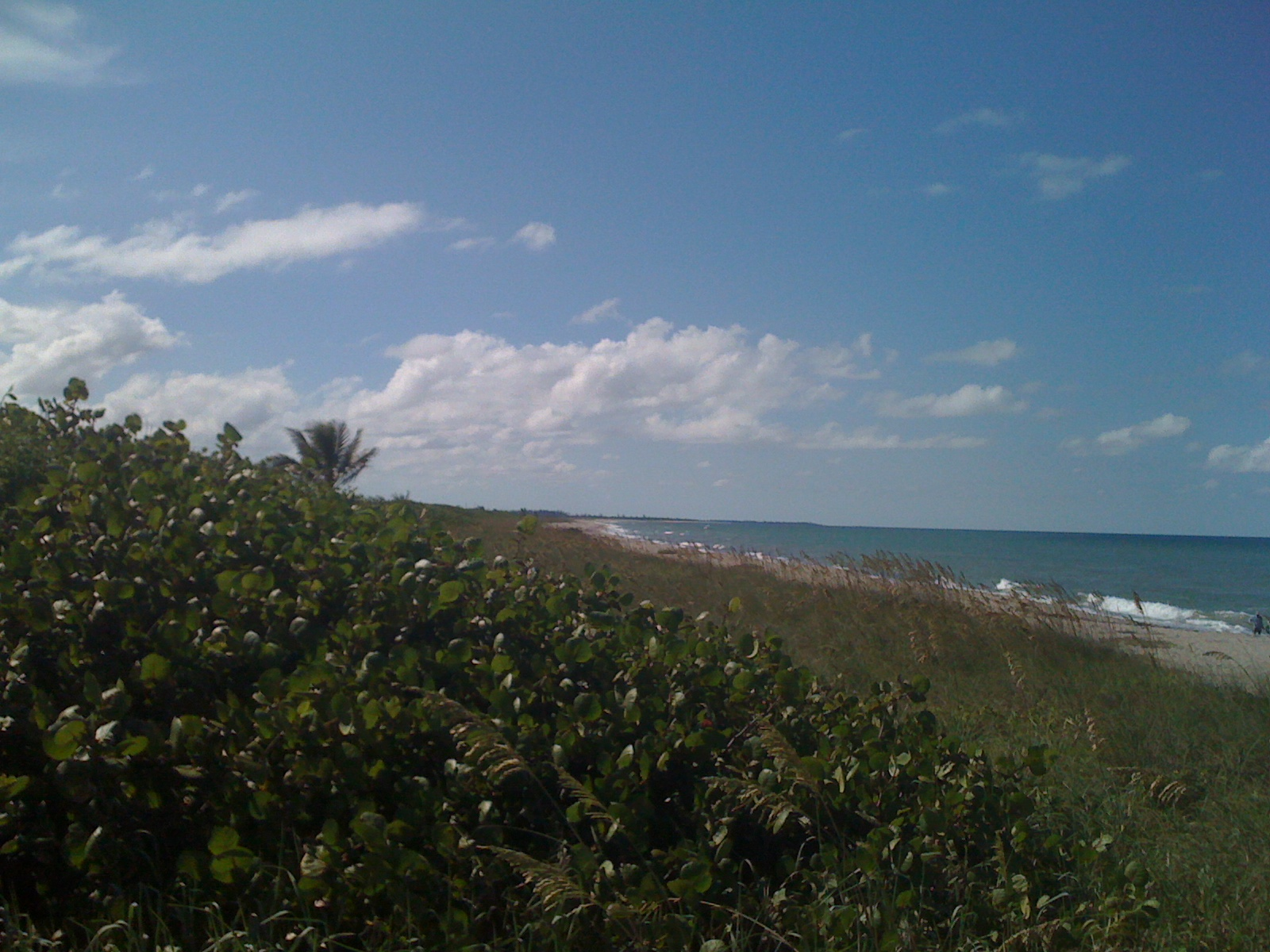
- Looking north toward St. Lucie Inlet Preserve State Park

- Jupiter Island Jupiter Island (North Atlantic)

Geography
- Location: North Atlantic
- Coordinates: 27°01′54″N 80°06′02″W

Administration
- United States
- County: Martin and Palm Beach

Jupiter Island is a barrier island on the coast of Martin and Palm Beach counties, Florida. It is bounded on the east by the Atlantic Ocean, on the north by the St. Lucie Inlet, on the west by the Indian River, and on the south by the Jupiter Inlet. Jupiter Island originally was two islands, Long Island on the north and Jupiter Island on the south, which were once separated by an inlet in the vicinity of North Jupiter Narrows and what is officially called Peck Lake, but commonly called Peck's Lake.

== Palm Beach County portion ==
=== Jupiter Inlet Colony ===
The small town of Jupiter Inlet Colony occupies the southern tip of the island.

=== Village of Tequesta ===
The village of Tequesta, which is primarily located on the mainland, abuts Jupiter Inlet Colony on the north.

=== Unincorporated Palm Beach County ===
There are two unincorporated Palm Beach County areas on the island:

- Between Tequesta Towers and Blowing Rocks Condo
- North of Coral Cove Park, a county park that is within Tequesta city limits

== Martin County portion ==
=== Town of Jupiter Island ===
The exceptionally wealthy town of Jupiter Island begins at the Palm Beach-Martin county line and extends north to include the southern portion of the Hobe Sound National Wildlife Refuge. Jupiter Island was also home to Celine Dion and her husband, René Angélil, and their sons, Rene-Charles, Nelson and Eddy, up until 2013. The zip code for the town is 33455, which is the zip code for much of Hobe Sound.

=== Unincorporated Martin County ===
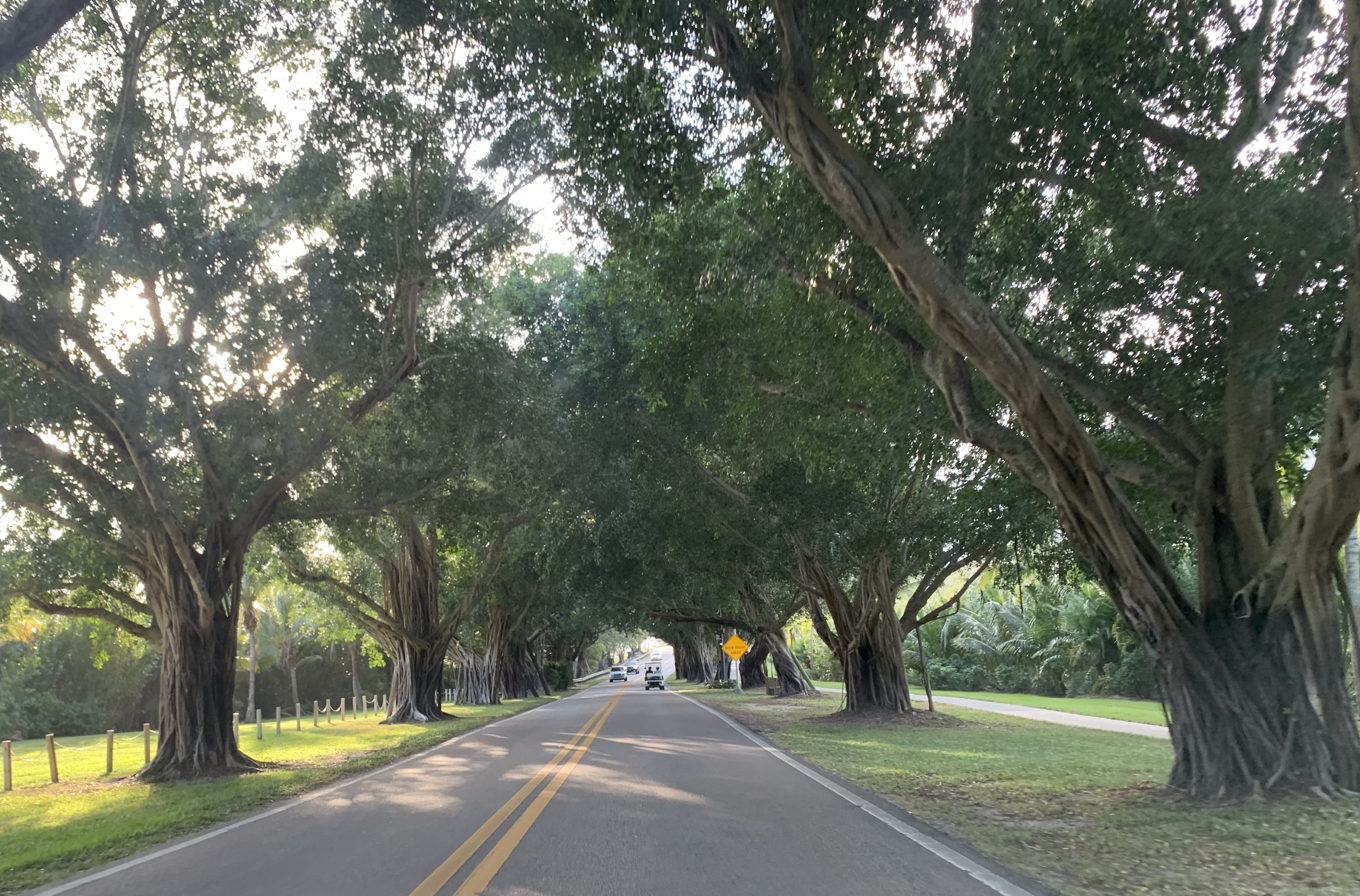
Looking west on Bridge Road

Unincorporated Martin County runs north from the northern Jupiter Island town limits to the St. Lucie Inlet and includes the following:

- The northern part of the Hobe Sound National Wildlife Refuge, and
- St. Lucie Inlet Preserve State Park, which runs north from the Hobe Sound National Wildlife Refuge to the St. Lucie Inlet and is accessible only by boat.
- Blowing Rocks Preserve an environmental preserve on Jupiter Island in Hobe Sound, Martin County.

== Transportation ==
The principal north-south road on Jupiter Island is Beach Road. Beach Road is also County Road 707, and extends from the Tequesta Bridge over the Intracoastal Waterway north to Bridge Road in the Town of Jupiter Island, where CR 708 turns left onto Bridge Road to go to Hobe Sound, via the Hobe Sound Bridge.
