= Thomas Barbour =

American herpetologist (1884–1946)

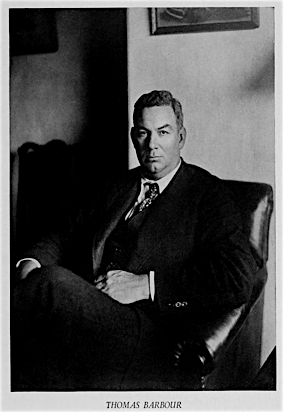
- Born: August 19, 1884; Martha's Vineyard, Massachusetts
- Died: January 8, 1946 (aged 61); Boston, Massachusetts
- Education: Harvard University
- Known for: Naturalist, author, professor, & director of the Museum of Comparative Zoology at Harvard University
- Spouse: Rosamond Pierce
- Parent(s): Colonel William Barbour & Julia Adelaide Sprague
- Relatives: Senator William Warren Barbour (R NJ) (Brother)

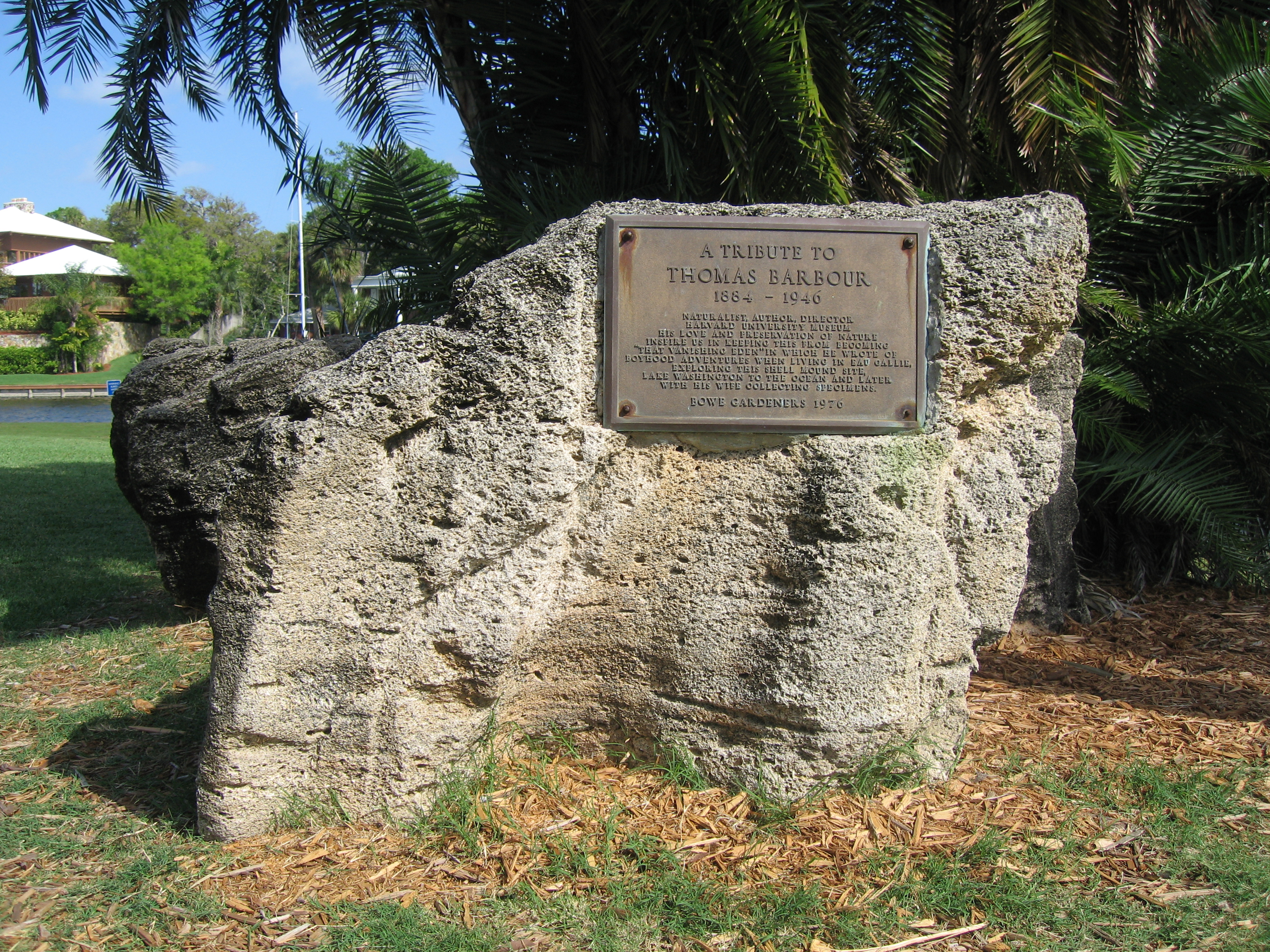
Thomas Barbour Memorial in Ballard Park, Melbourne, Florida

Thomas Barbour (August 19, 1884 – January 8, 1946) was an American herpetologist. He was the first president of the Dexter School in 1926. From 1927 until 1946, he was director of the Harvard Museum of Comparative Zoology (MCZ) founded in 1859 by Louis Agassiz at Harvard University in Cambridge, Massachusetts.

== Life and career ==
Barbour, the eldest of four brothers, was born in 1884 to Colonel William Barbour, and his wife, Julia Adelaide Sprague. Colonel Barbour was founder and president of The Linen Thread Company, Inc., a successful thread manufacturing enterprise having much business in the United States, Ireland, and Scotland. Although born on Martha's Vineyard, Massachusetts, where the family was spending the summer, Barbour grew up in Monmouth, New Jersey, where one of his younger brothers, William Warren Barbour, entered the political arena, eventually serving as U.S. Senator from New Jersey from 1931 to 1937 and again from 1938 to 1943.

At age fifteen, Thomas Barbour was taken to visit Harvard University, which, entranced by its Museum of Comparative Zoology, he later attended. At Harvard, he studied under Alexander Agassiz, son of Louis Agassiz. Having received his B.A., M.A., and Ph.D. from that university, Barbour joined the faculty in 1911 when his doctoral dissertation was published, and he took on the position of curator of reptiles and amphibians at the Museum of Comparative Zoology. Eventually he became the Alexander Agassiz Professor of Zoology and, in 1927, director of the museum. Although primarily interested in reptiles and amphibians, he also studied birds and insects, particularly butterflies. His biological interests, however, were remarkably diversified, and he is considered to be one of the last of a dying breed: a general naturalist.

His scientific travels took him through Africa, Asia, North America, South America, and Central America, among other regions. He particularly enjoyed Panama, Costa Rica, and Cuba, which he visited at length on at least thirty occasions beginning in 1908, generally staying in Soledad at the Harvard Botanical Gardens, now known as the Jardin Botanico de Cienfuegos. Barbour served as custodian of these gardens from 1927 until his death in 1946. In his book, Naturalist in Cuba, Barbour writes, "I suspect that I am the only living American naturalist who has visited all parts of the island again and again, for I am not only a Cuban by adoption, but a devoted friend of the land and its people." In addition to the expected scientific discussion of the island's flora and fauna, Barbour provides a description of Cuban society and culture.

He was elected a Fellow of the American Academy of Arts and Sciences in 1916. In 1923 and 1924, he was one of the scientists and financial benefactors who founded the Barro Colorado Island Laboratory in Panama, location of the Smithsonian Tropical Research Institute. The island, originally a hilltop, sits in the middle of Gatun Lake, which was created when the Chagres River was dammed during the Panama Canal building project.

Along with better than 400 scholarly articles, Barbour wrote several books including the autobiographical Naturalist at Large (1943), Naturalist in Cuba (1945), A Naturalist's Scrapbook (1946), and That Vanishing Eden (1944), which explores the natural world of a remote, undeveloped Florida.

In 1906, Barbour married Rosamond Pierce of Brookline, Massachusetts. A two-year honeymoon took them through remote reaches of the Dutch East Indies, India, Burma, Java, China, and New Guinea with Barbour's wife helping him to photograph animals and collect specimens. Their union resulted in six children and eleven grandchildren. The family home was on Clarendon Street in Boston's Back Bay, with summers spent in Beverly Farms, Massachusetts.

In 1927, Barbour was made director of the Harvard Museum of Comparative Zoology and, in 1931, organized and sent an expedition to Australia for the dual purpose of procuring specimens - the museum being "weak in Australian animals and...desires[ing] to complete its series" - and to engage in "the study of the animals of the region when alive." The Harvard Australian Expedition (1931–1932), as it became known, was a six-man venture led by Harvard Professor William Morton Wheeler, with the others being Dr. P. Jackson Darlington, Jr. (a renowned coleopterist), Dr. Glover Morrill Allen and his student Ralph Nicholson Ellis, medical officer Dr. Ira M. Dixon, and William E. Schevill (a graduate-student in his twenties and Associate Curator of Invertebrate Palaeontology). Barbour said at the time "We shall hope for specimens' of the kangaroo, the wombat, the Tasmanian devil and Tasmanian wolf," and the mission was a success with over 300 mammal and thousands of insect specimens returning to the United States.

Barbour was elected to U.S. National Academy of Sciences in 1933 and the American Philosophical Society in 1937. He was a trustee of the Carnegie Institution of Washington from 1934 until his death in 1946.

During the last two years of his life Barbour was in failing health, following a blood clot that had developed while he was in Miami. He was at the Museum of Comparative Zoology as usual on January 4, 1946, and in a happy mood at home in Boston that evening. But he was stricken later in the night with a cerebral hemorrhage and died on January 8, without regaining consciousness.

=== Frog drop experiment ===
For many years, Barbour and Darlington had friendly arguments about Barbour's advocacy of faunal dispersion by land bridges versus Darlington's advocacy of extreme-wind-borne dispersal of small animals over isolated islands. To test his ideas, Darlington dropped several live frogs from a window on the fifth floor of the Museum. Barbour and a crowd of spectators observed the experiment. The dropped frogs were stunned and remained still for a few seconds, but almost immediately they started to recover and in a few minutes were hopping normally.

== Legacy ==
Thomas Barbour is commemorated in the scientific names of the following species and subspecies of reptiles.

- Amphisbaena barbouri, an amphisbaenian
- Anolis barbouri, a lizard
- Aristelliger barbouri, a gecko
- Atheris barbouri, a venomous snake
- Bachia barbouri, a lizard
- Celestus barbouri, a lizard
- Cnemaspis barbouri, a gecko
- Epicrates cenchria barbouri, a boa
- Eunectes barbouri
- Graptemys barbouri, a turtle
- Masticophis barbouri, a snake
- Mixcoatlus barbouri, a venomous snake
- Phelsuma barbouri, a gecko
- Plestiodon barbouri, a skink
- Pseudogonatodes barbouri, a gecko
- Rhabdophis barbouri, a snake
- Scincella barbouri, a skink
- Sistrurus miliarius barbouri, a venomous snake
- Trimetopon barbouri, a snake

The street he grew up on was named after him, Thomas Barbour Drive, in Melbourne, Florida; it is the street on which Ballard Park is located.

== See also ==
- Ballard Park
