= Ballard Park (Melbourne, Florida) =

Park in Florida, United States

Coordinates: 28.12207°N 80.62517°W

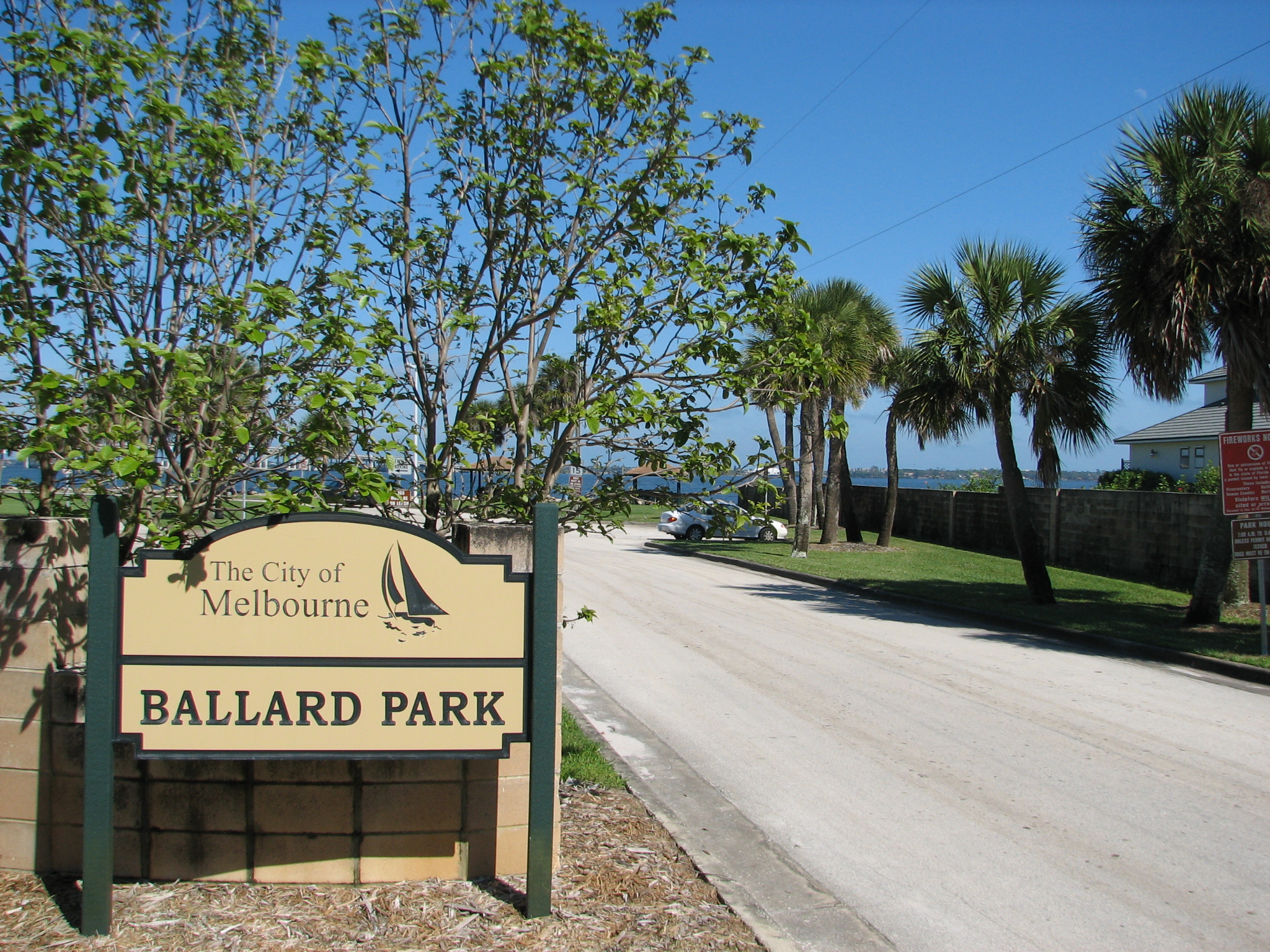
- Ballard Park entrance
- Interactive map of Ballard Park
- Type: Public park
- Location: 924 Thomas Barbour Drive; Melbourne, Florida
- Area: 10 acres (40,000 m^{2})
- Operator: City of Melbourne
- Open: All year

Ballard Park is a public park located at 924 Thomas Barbour Drive, Melbourne, Florida and is situated on the Indian River Lagoon and the Eau Gallie River in what was historically Eau Gallie, FL. It contains diverse recreational facilities and amenities, including boat ramps, lighted tennis courts and a pavilion. The park also contains a memorial to naturalist and author Thomas Barbour, who frequented the shell mounds on the park grounds as a boy.

Two archeologists have speculated that the park is on the site of the former Ais Indian town of Pentoaya, where they spent their summers.

The Melbourne High School rowing team bases their training here.

== Gallery ==
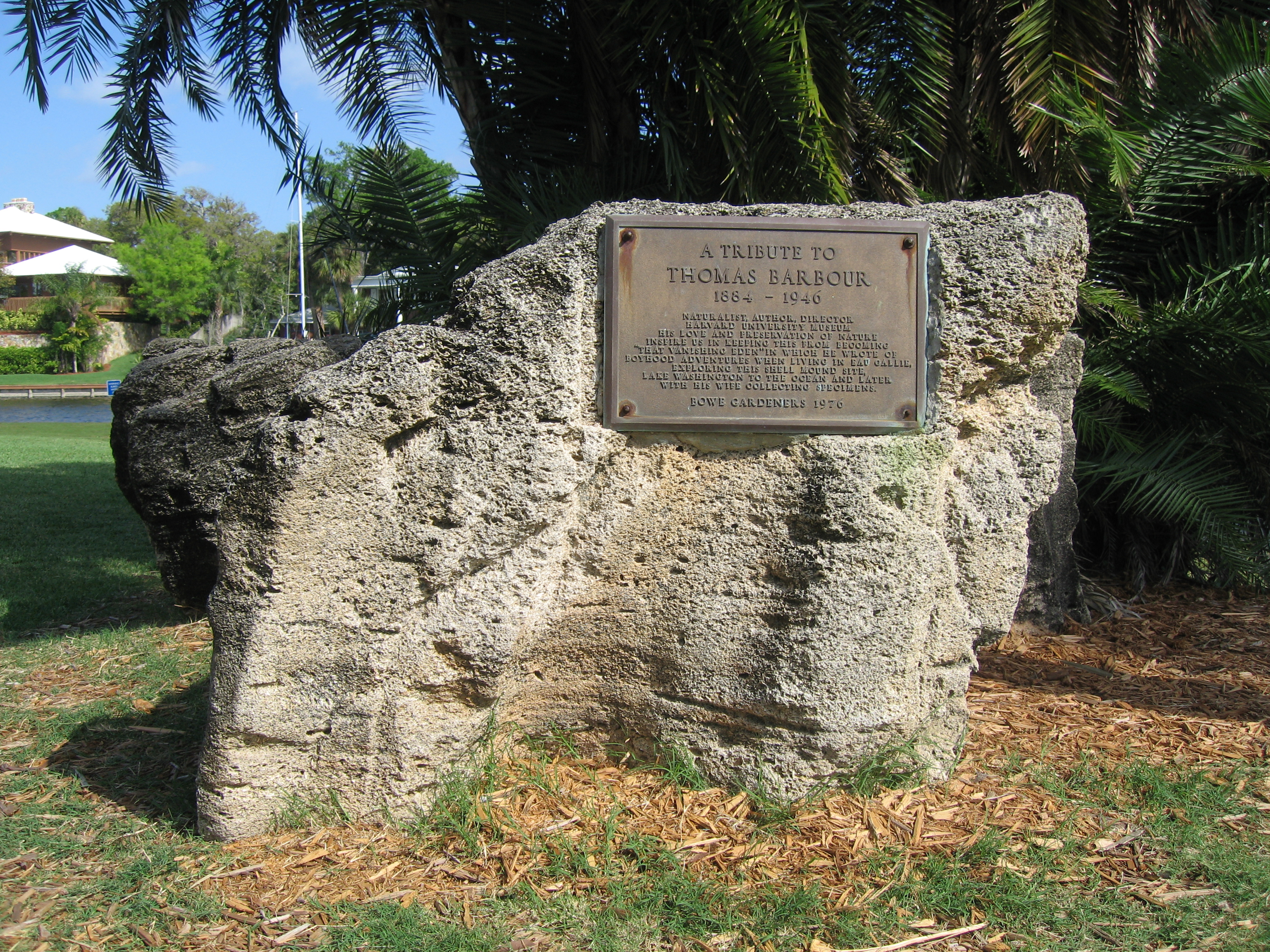
Memorial of Thomas Barbour located in park
