= Eau Gallie Yacht Club =

Coordinates: 28°08′40.64″N 80°36′03.96″W

- Burgee
- Short name: EGYC
- Founded: 1907
- Location: 100 Datura Drive. Indian Harbour Beach, Florida United States
- Website: www.egyachtclub.com

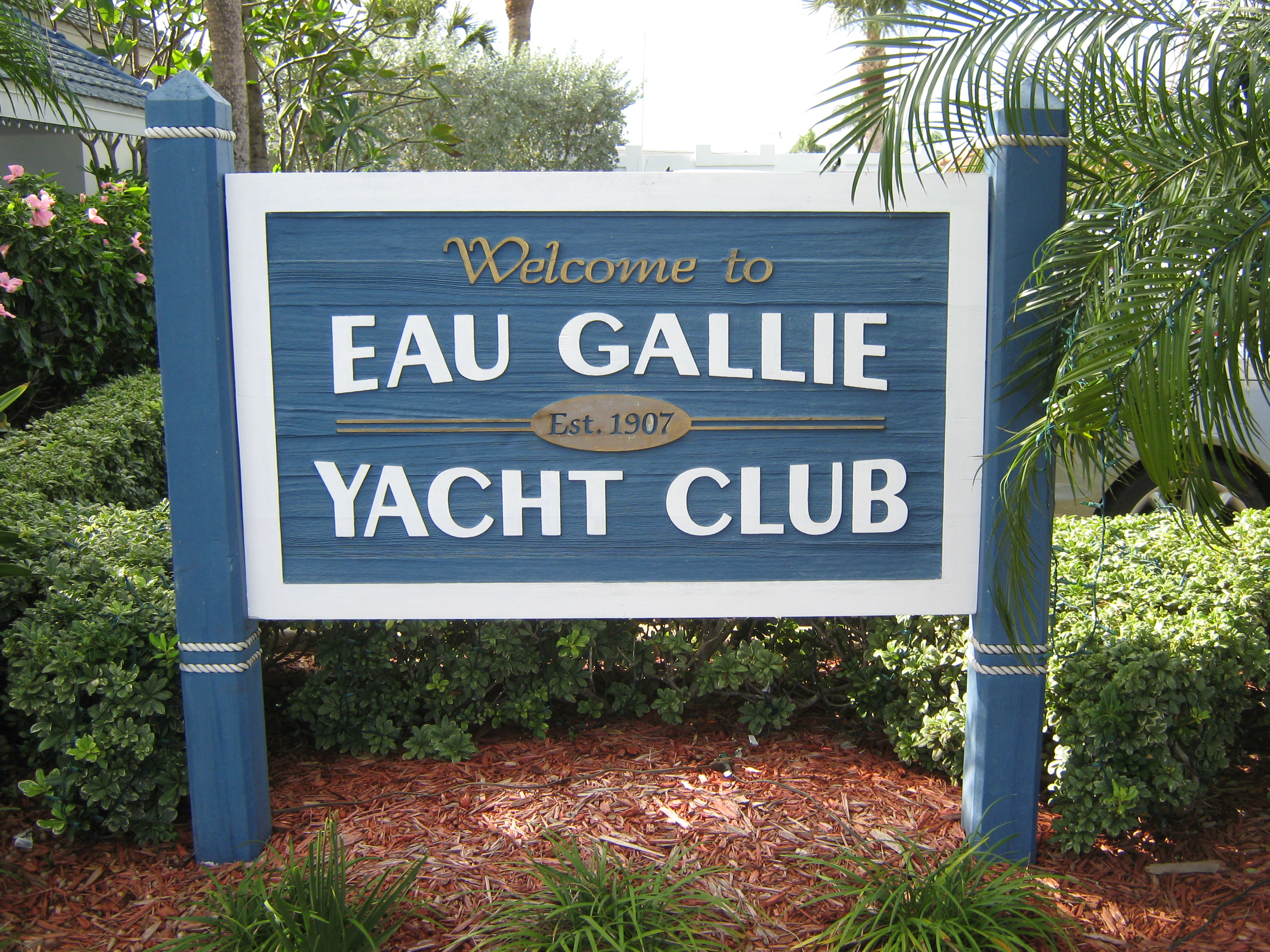
Entrance sign.

The Eau Gallie Yacht Club is a U.S. boating organization, located in Indian Harbour Beach, Florida with access to the Indian River. The original clubhouse is also a historic building. The club has 1,200 members.

== History ==
In 1907, a local group formed and launched the Eau Gallie Yacht Club with George F. Patterson as the first Commodore. Others in the group included General John B. Castleman, Alexander Hodgson, the Gleasons and the Rossetters. In 1910, the Eau Gallie Yacht Club built a clubhouse along the Eau Gallie River.

In 1936, the club was the venue for the International Moth Class Regatta.

On May 29, 1942, members of the club rescued eight sailors whose ship had been torpedoed by a German U-boat.

In 1960, the Eau Gallie Yacht Club moved to its current location in Indian Harbour Beach. The Brevard Historical Commission considered the original clubhouse historical due to the influence of the organization on boating in the region and the architectural significance of the building.

The 2001 US Sailing Team contained two club members. The 2002 team had one member.

== Youth sailing ==
The Yacht Club started its own sailing team in 2021 the Eau Gallie Yacht Club Youth Sailing team. The EGYCYS fleet is made up of ILCA, Optimist, J24 and Club 420 classes. EGYCYS is part of the FECS youth series but compete in Club and collegiate regattas throughout Florida. The Eau Gallie Yacht Club also has youth summer programs available for members.
