= Environmental issues in Brevard County =

Environmental issues in Brevard County in Florida United States are highlighted by the amount of waterline, the amount of wetlands, the quantity of residents and visitors to the area, as well as the usual threat to air quality from commuters. Assisting in this is the Florida Space Coast Clean Cities Coalition which is headquartered in Brevard.

Location of Brevard County within the state of Florida

== Land preservation and animal habitats ==
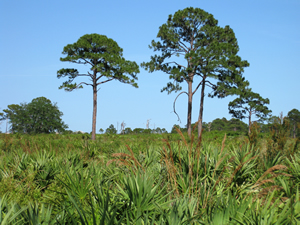
Pine flatwoods and sand pine scrub

There are a number of wildlife refuges in the county: the Merritt Island National Wildlife Refuge, the Canaveral National Seashore, the St. Johns National Wildlife Refuge, and the Archie Carr National Wildlife Refuge.

=== Environmentally Endangered Lands Program ===
Local taxes support an Environmentally Endangered Lands (EEL) Program to protect environmentally sensitive areas. The 395-acre Malabar Scrub Sanctuary located in Malabar, Florida. Malabar is also a Trail Town. The 470-acre (1.9 km^{2}) Enchanted Forest in Titusville was the first land set aside under this program. It preserves a significant sample of the natural communities that were originally found in this region, including xeric oak scrub, mature hardwood forests, wetlands and pine flatwoods. A recent controversy was solved when the County decided to rehire the Nature Conservancy to negotiate the purchase of EEL acquisitions.

The Management & Education Center at The Enchanted Forest Sanctuary in Titusville, is the EEL Program's first regional educational facility. The EEL Program was established in 1990 to protect the natural habitats of Brevard County by acquiring environmentally sensitive lands for conservation, passive recreation, and environmental education. This was made possible by citizens who voted to tax themselves up to $55 million for the acquisition and maintenance of Brevard's natural areas. Residents reaffirmed the EEL Program in 2004 under a second referendum to protect the natural habitats within Brevard County by the acquisition of environmentally sensitive lands through a willing seller program for the purpose of conservation, passive recreation, and environmental education. To maximize the funding, the EEL Program forms partnerships with federal, state and local agencies that are committed to the protection of natural resources and our long-term quality of life. EEL sanctuaries are managed to preserve native habitats and the plants and animals that live there.

As of 2010, there have been 37 square miles (96 km^{2}) purchased under the EEL program.

=== Barrier Island Center ===
In 2008, the county built a $3 million 5,700 square feet (530 m^{2}) building south of Melbourne Beach, Florida. Barrier Island Center is a sanctuary management and education center. The 5,700-square-foot (530 m^{2}) facility hosts environmental programs and features an interactive exhibit and presentation hall. Programs include educational projects, beach cleanups, and guided hikes on the Barrier Island Trail.

=== Merritt Island Wildlife Refuge ===
The 140,000-acre (570 km^{2}) Merritt Island National Wildlife Refuge provides and opportunity to observe animals in their natural habitat. It is home to many species of birds, wild boar, white-tailed deer, American alligators, bobcats, nine-banded armadillos and other creatures. There are nature trails, a US Ranger Nature Center and a 7-mile (11 km) scenic drive through a wild bird habitat.

=== Enchanted Forest Sanctuary ===
The Enchanted Forest Sanctuary preserves a diversity of the natural habitats found on the Space Coast. Several miles of hiking trails pass through the natural environment of the Sanctuary. Plant life in the Sanctuary includes both temperate (northern) and subtropical (southern) species which grow here together. There are five basic habitat types in the Enchanted Forest Sanctuary: oak, scrub, mesic and hydric hammock, wet prairie, and pine flatwood. Wildlife species found here include the eastern indigo snake, Florida scrub lizard, gopher tortoise, white-tailed deer, and bobcat.

Every April, the Friends of the Enchanted Forest present "Earth Day Family Fun Fest." About 800 attend.

=== Erna Nixon Park ===
The Erna Nixon Park is a 54 acres (22 ha) natural Florida hammock and nature preserve that features a 2,345-foot (715 m) long elevated boardwalk with 640 feet (200 m) of trail that winds through three different ecosystems. Signs on the nature trail identifies many different plant species. A nature center with exhibits is on the site.

=== Bird and turtle habitats ===
The brown pelican, wood stork, snowy egret, great blue heron and loggerhead sea turtles are endangered species present in Brevard.

The Space Coast contains most of the sites included in the Florida East Coast portion of the "Great Florida Birding Trail."

The Space Coast Birding and Wildlife Festival (Space Coast Flyways Festival) is held in January. It attracts about 5,000 attendees, the third largest in the US.

The Welcome Back Songbirds Festival is held at the Merritt Island National Wildlife Refuge in April.

In 1987, Brevard hosted the last dusky seaside sparrow, now extinct. There have been only two such avian failures since listing of endangered species began in 1973. This event has presented a challenge to ensure that other environmental concerns are addressed in a timely manner.

The Florida scrub jay has been thought to be threatened in the county for many years, because the species is territorial and cannot move to better grounds when its habitat is jeopardized. In 2009, the Brevard Zoo is moving the remaining 15 scrub jay families native to Palm Bay to Buck Lake Conservation Area in Mims.

In 2010, officials rescued 3,000 loggerhead turtles from hypothermia, brought about by unseasonably cold weather in early January.

=== Floral pests ===
Native flora is threatened by various invasive plants, including the Brazilian pepper (Schinus terebinthifolius). Possession and cultivation of this tree is illegal. Large numbers of volunteers periodically cut down these invaders, particularly along waterways. The Australian pine (Casuarina spp.) is being actively attacked.

Other foreign pests include the Asian ambrosia beetle (Xyleborus glabratus) threatens the local avocado industry and redbay trees (Persea borbonia). The fungus they carry destroyed 95% of redbays in the county by 2009.

== Water quality ==
Brevard County has 8,000 miles (13,000 km) of waterline, presenting a challenge to water environmental management.

In 2013, there were four major problems with water quality in the Indian River Lagoon. 1) Excess nitrogen and phosphorus from runoff from the application of fertilizer; 2) an estimated 8 to 11% septic tank failure. There are tens of thousands of septic tanks in the county. 3) Muck from construction, farming, erosion and dead plants, all find their way to the bottom of the lagoon, preventing growth and consuming vital oxygen essential to marine flora and fauna; 4) Invasive species, including the Asian green mussel, South American charru mussel, and the Australian spotted jellyfish, all eat clams and fish larvae.

In 2017, excessive rain from storms, forced the county to discharge 20,000,000 US gallons (76,000,000 L; 17,000,000 imp gal) of untreated sewage into the Indian River Lagoon near Indian Harbour Beach. The law permits the dumping of treated wastewater. Dumping untreated sewage is a health-hazard. It contributes .5% of the nutrients in the lagoon. The county signed a consent order in 2018, that required the county, among other things, to install 3.5 miles (5.6 km) of force mains on the South Beaches from Florida State Road 518 south, at a cost of $10 million.

In December 2005, four communities including Cocoa Beach, failed the salinity test in the adjacent Indian River Lagoon. The salinity was too low due to excessive fresh water runoff, a frequent problem in the area. Each community must address this problem. In 2010, the St. Johns River Water Management District was diverting the fresh water (and sediment and pollution) from the C-1 and C-54 canals into the Saint Johns instead of the lagoon.

Watershed Action Volunteers (WAV) provides workers, from among their 300 members, to help monitor water quality, conduct nature surveys, planting sea oats and other eco-friendly tasks. Brevard had 1 million US gallons (3,800 m^{3}) of escaped sewage in 2004. Aging sewer systems was blamed. Brevard stood tenth in the state, which is consistent with its population. In 1970, the county had 20,000 septic tanks. This number rose to an estimated 100,000 tanks in 2016.

Palm Bay has hosted Water Fest featuring many water games for children. The Fest teaches water conservation.

=== St. Johns Watershed ===
The St. Johns River Water Management District maintains and protects local waterways and estuaries such as the St. Johns River, the Indian River, and the Banana River. The district has directed that lawn sprinkling be done once a week during Standard time, twice a week during Daylight Saving Time. Violators are subject to a $50 fine for the first offense.

In 2013, the Florida Department of Environmental Protection required that benchmarks be met within 15 years: cut nitrogen runoff to the lagoon by 67% and 72% of phosphorus. Because of its marine origins, Florida soil is naturally high in phosphorus.

The St. John's Watershed Action Volunteers provides workers, from among their 300 members, to help monitor water quality, conduct nature surveys, planting sea oats and other eco-friendly tasks.

A 2012 resultor algae bloom resulted in a 50% dieback of sea grass, vital for marine creatures. The bloom is believed to have been triggered by extreme winter cold spells and drought.

Lagoon water samples tested as high as 5% salt, twice desirable. Ocean water is 2.5%.

=== Ocean ===
In 2005, divers and biologists want to restrict fishing and ocean dumping at Oculina Reef to protect the deep-sea coral that grows only here, about 30 miles (48 km) offshore from Cape Canaveral to Fort Pierce. They are seeking a federal designation of a "National Marine Sanctuary." They are opposed by area fishermen.

In 2008, Florida passed the Clean Oceans Act with support from local legislators. The intention was to force gambling ships out of Port Canaveral to dump sewage more than 14 miles (23 km) from shore. This took effect in 2009. During that year the gambling ships went bankrupt. This was believed due to the economy and other business reasons and not because of this statute. The water quality near shore, which was rarely below standard, did not change.

=== Marine life ===
Sea turtles nest on Brevard shores. They are sensitive to night lights which have affected their reproduction locally. The not-for-profit Sea Turtle Preservation Society (STPS) educates the public about marine turtles. The Florida Fish and Wildlife Conservation Commission and U.S. Fish and Wildlife Service permits STPS to work with these endangered and threatened sea turtles.

The 900-acre (3.6 km^{2}) Archie Carr National Wildlife Refuge contains a twenty-mile (32 km) section of coastline from Melbourne Beach south. This is the largest nesting area for loggerhead sea turtles in the western hemisphere and the second largest nesting beach in the world. Twenty-five percent of all loggerhead sea turtle and 35% of all green sea turtle nests in the United States occur in this twenty miles (32 km) zone.

The Marine Resources Council focuses on issues affecting the Indian River Lagoon through its programs on shoreline restoration, water quality monitoring and right whale watching. It is possible to watch right whales from December through March as they migrate to their summer home in the South Atlantic.

A recent inventory disclosed a growing incidence of diseases, including cancers, lesions and tumors in dolphins, turtles and fish. Most recently, some shrimp and blue crab populations have been infected with a flesh-eating parasite, and scientists warn health problems may one day arise in people who use the estuary as well. The increasing appearance of invasive species—such as an Asian green mussel recently found—which can beat out other species for space in the lagoon and erode native diversity. Shrinkage has been documented in the lagoon's rich biodiversity and degradation of its water quality from crystal clear to murky green, which threaten its fisheries and Brevard's tourism industries.

The Space Coast Chapter of the Coastal Conservation Association (SCCCCA) is to advise and educate the public on conservation of marine resources. It is primarily interested in conserving fisheries for sportsman.

There has been concern over the pace of manatee perinatal deaths in 2009. This pace may adversely affect attempts to preserve the species.

Bottlenose dolphins have become stranded in the Indian River Lagoon usually resulting in their deaths. The highest number of annual deaths in the lagoon which covers another country besides Brevard, was 62 in 2008. The percentage found in the Brevard portion is about 80%.

=== Beaches ===
The 400 feet (120 m) Port Canaveral entry along with two jetties, block the normal drift of sand from north to south, robbing the beaches south for 13 miles (21 km), of sand replenishment. Hundreds of millions of dollars will be spent replenishing these beaches from offshore sand, where allowed, and by dump trucks, when not allowed. 60% of this will be paid by the federal government, the remainder by county and local government.

Lawmakers have purchased access to the ocean and beaches. Developers and owners were anticipated and not allowed to "wall off" ocean beach access as they have done elsewhere.

The City of Satellite Beach has permanently preserved 37% of its oceanfront in its natural state (prevented it from being developed).

2005 - For the third year in a row, five of Brevard County's beaches were picked as some of the nation's cleanest, according to the (National) Clean Beaches Council. Brevard's beaches that made the list are Alan Shepard Park in Cocoa Beach, Cherie Down Park in Cape Canaveral, Ocean Avenue Beach Park, Spessard Holland Park in Melbourne Beach and The Boardwalk in Indialantic.

The mission of Keep Brevard Beautiful (KBB) is to motivate and educate business, school, group and individual partnerships to reduce litter, recycle, landscape, and beautify for the environmental and economic benefit of Brevard County. Among other tasks, KBB schedules and oversees volunteer cleanups four times a year along roads, parks and beaches.

Nearby is the Canaveral National Seashore park, a twenty-four mile stretch of undisturbed ocean beach near the Kennedy Space Center. Visitors take self-guided tours assisted by information from park rangers. Travelocity.com named this park among the top ten Florida beaches as well as among the top ten Family Attractions in Florida.

The Mid-Reach Shore Protection Project has been the subject of considerable controversy The ‘mid-reach’ is home to a natural reef which runs along the beach from Patrick Space Force Base down to Indialantic. In the past contractors have rebuilt the dunes after storms, however this larger Army Corps project proposes to bury the natural reef and replace it with a reef offshore. Studies have shown mitigation reefs do not adequately perform the ecological function of natural ones, and a group called 'Save The Mid-Reach' has organized locally to redesign the project and require better material standards for nourishment sand. The project will spend up to 500 million dollars on sand that is designed to wash away.

=== Marine pests ===
Authorities monitor water quality to try to free the waterways from floral pests such as the water hyacinth and hydrilla.

=== Threats to potable water ===
In 2010, there were 393 contaminated fuel tanks needing cleanup. 457 potable wells were within 0.25 miles (0.40 km) of these tanks, and therefore posing a potential health threat to those consuming water from them.

An oncologist raised in the South Beaches developed cancer. She requested that water samples be measured in the area. In 2018 potable water distributed by the city of Melbourne measured up to 12 parts per trillion of PFBA (perfluorobutanoic acid). The EPA has established no standards for allowable levels of PFBA for drinking water. Minnesota has established a guideline of 7,000 parts per trillion. The measurements were well below this level. Critics thought that Minnesota standards were too low. There was no explanation of why the substance was in the water. Potable water furnished by the Cocoa water department found none of the contaminants. A cancer cluster of 175 cases including 50 people under 40 were reported on social media in a Satellite Beach Facebook group called Satellite Beach Health and Hope for Tomorrow. Cancer clusters have been found before in the area.

Erin Brockovich agreed to visit the area in October to help cancer victims with their claim of water pollution. A spokesperson for Satellite Beach said the area under discussion was not in the city, but in an unincorporated area in the county. A similar complaint in 1992, was investigated by the Agency for Toxic Substances and Disease Registry. They found that there was no public health hazard and overall cancer rates were lower in Satellite Beach and the surrounding area than they were statewide. Breast and cervical cancer rates were higher.

=== Threats to groundwater ===
Two substances of concern, PFOS (Perfluorooctanesulfonic acid) and PFOA (perfluorooctanoic acid) were found in beachside groundwater. Human epidemiological studies found associations between PFOS exposure and high cholesterol and adverse reproductive and developmental effects. Up to 430.1 parts per trillion have been measured in well water (nonpotable) in Cocoa Beach. Commentators suggested that Patrick Space Force Base used to employ firefighting foams that included these substances. They have since been phased out.

== Insect pests ==
Mosquitoes can carry malaria, yellow fever, and equine encephalitis. The bites of yellow flies can sting people and domestic animals. The county conducts spraying for these pests, spraying at night to minimize the possibility of contaminating people or killing benign insects such as bees, which are active during the day. Each municipality must authorize the county to overfly its area to spray for mosquitoes.

An invasion of white fly originally from Belize attacked palms and other ornamental plants for the first time in 2012.

== Wild hogs ==
Wild hogs have become a nuisance in some suburbs.

== Alien species ==
Species, alien to the area, have been discovered. They disrupt the environment and sometime interbreed with local species creating an unknowable species with unknown requirements or potential damage to the environment.

- The african clawed frog was first discovered locally in 2011.
- The false map turtle was discovered locally in 2009.
- The red-footed tortoise was discovered in 2007.
- Coyotes first entered the county in 2011.

== Air quality ==
Despite its location by the ocean, air quality is not perfect. One website scores the county as lowest in the US for certain particulates

== Alternative solutions ==
=== Energy ===
The Florida Solar Energy Center conducts education and research into alternative energy sources including hydrogen, building construction, as well as solar thermal and photovoltaics.

== See also ==
- List of environmental issues
