= St. Lucie Inlet =

Ocean inlet in Florida, U.S.

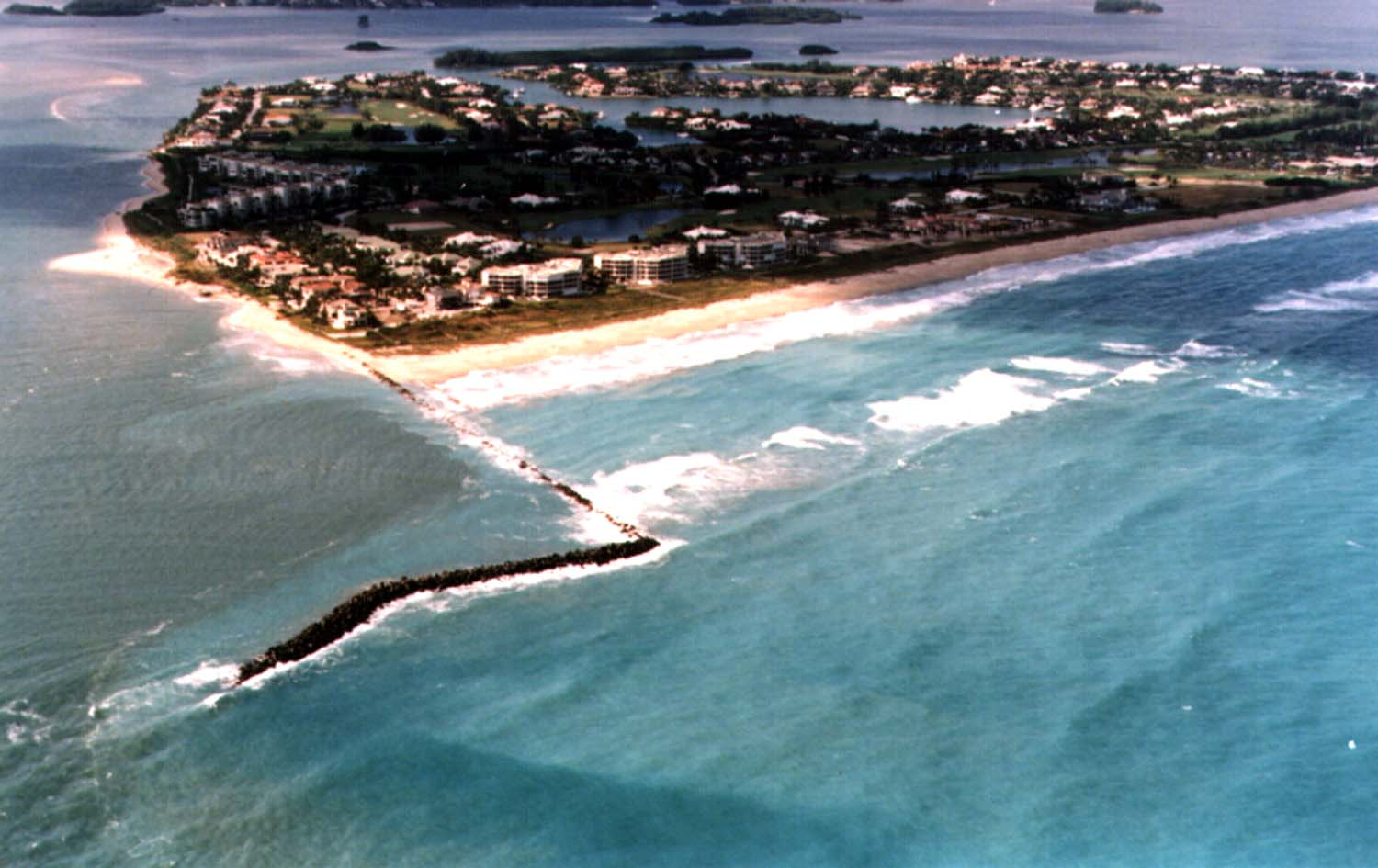
St. Lucie Inlet

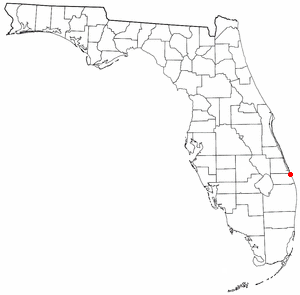
Locations of St. Lucie Inlet, Florida

The St. Lucie Inlet is located between Hutchinson Island and Jupiter Island in Martin County, Florida, at coordinates 27°09′58″N 80°09′24″W. The St. Lucie Inlet is one of six inlets into the Indian River Lagoon.

South of the inlet is the St. Lucie Inlet State Park with hard and soft coral reefs. Just to the north of the inlet is Bathtub Beach Reef, a sabellariid worm reef. The beaches along Hutchinson Island are the third highest nesting beaches in the Western Hemisphere for the loggerhead sea turtle.

== History ==
The "Santa Lucia" Inlet appeared on maps in 1500 and 1683, although the reliability of such early maps is generally discounted by scholars. The first accurate surveys of the Indian River Lagoon by Gerard de Brahm and Bernard Romans in the 1760s and 1770s do not record any open inlet in that area. Nor was any open inlet recorded there by Charles Vignoles during his survey of this area in the early 1820s. Soon thereafter, there was a natural inlet called Gilbert's Bar in that general area, used by the pirate Don Pedro Gilbert as an escape route from deep-draft pursuit vessels. The "Santa Lucia" Inlet crossed by Jonathan Dickinson in 1696 was located at the Old Indian River Inlet just north of the modern, artificial Fort Pierce Inlet. As is true for most inlets between barrier islands, the inlet closed and opened repeatedly in the past through natural process. The inlet has been kept open for the past century-and-a-half by frequent dredging.

== Dredging ==
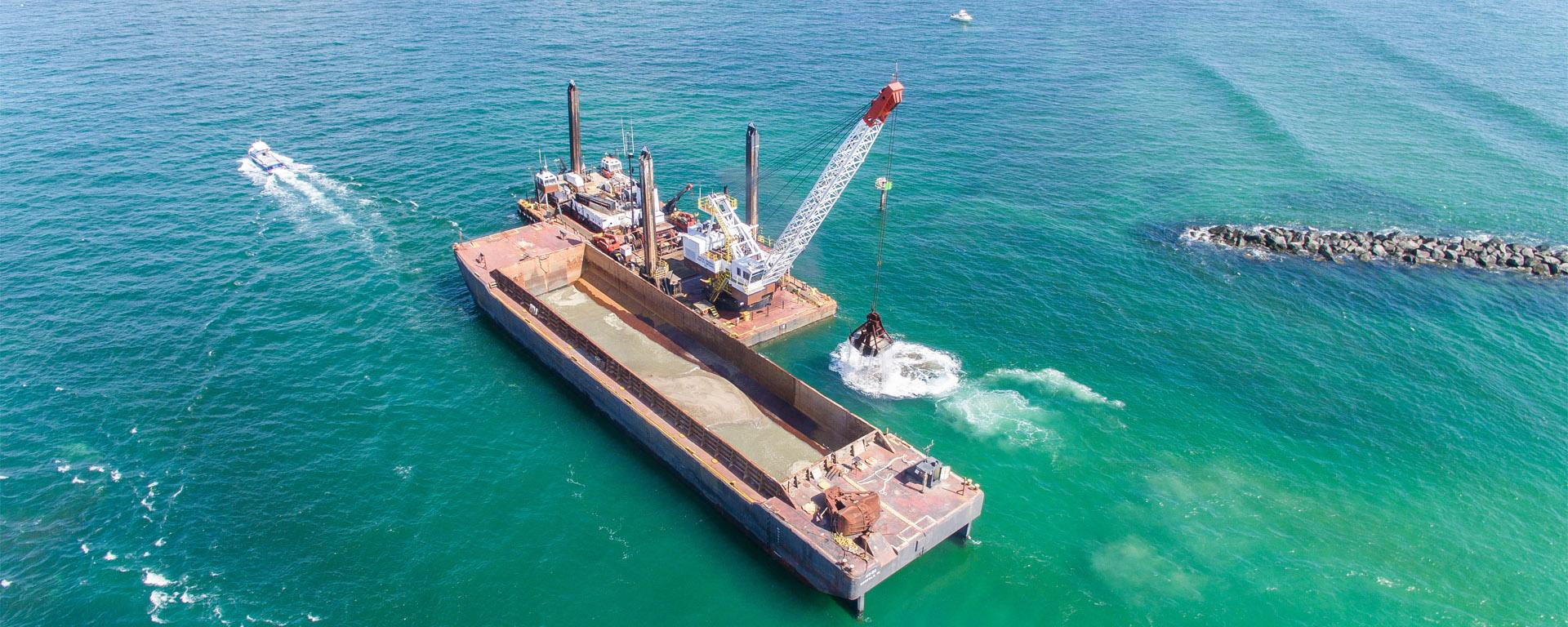
Dredging 2018 St. Lucie Inlet

In 1844, before the modern dredge, Samuel Peck and settlers of the Indian River Armed Occupation Colony took picks and shovels making the first recorded opening. In 1892, a dredge was used to deepen the inlet for a cost of $2,000. In 1981, the inlet was dredged at a cost of $8 million. To keep the inlet from shoaling closed as the barrier islands move requires regular dredging of the inlet.

According to the U.S. Army Corps of Engineers, Section 201 of the Flood Control Act of 1965 authorized the dredging project which includes a channel 16 ft deep and 300 ft wide, tapering to 10 ft deep and 150 ft wide through the inlet, and a channel 7 ft deep and 100 ft wide between the inlet and the Intracoastal Waterway.

In July 2013, the last maintenance dredging contract was conducted. No money was appropriated for dredging in fiscal year 2015 by the U.S. Congress, and no money was requested for dredging in the U.S. President's budget request to Congress for fiscal year 2016. Id.

In early February 2018, two simultaneous projects began dredging sand around the St. Lucie Inlet to help replenish beaches and clear the inlet for boaters. The projects are part of the Bathtub Beach-to-Sailfish Point renourishment project. It is a post-Hurricane Irma project by the Federal Emergency Management Agency costing $1.8 million, FEMA is picking up 87 percent of the cost. Crews will move about 100,000 cubic yards of sand. Besides restoring the beach and dunes, the sand will help protect infrastructure, such as MacArthur Boulevard, from storm surges. Kathy FitzPatrick, Martin County coastal engineer stated “Dredging will help open up the channel, enhancing navigability, and the sand pumped from there to the beach will enable us to open a nourished beach to residents and visitors once again". The work is meant to protect the inlet until a dredge arrives in about a month. The dredge will remove about remove 500,000 cubic yards of sand — enough to cover a football field 9 feet, 3 inches deep — from the inlet and put it in site called a "borrow area" off the coast of the Town of Jupiter Island. In 2019, that sand will be sucked up and spread on beaches from the inlet south to the Martin–Palm Beach county line.
