= Hobe Sound National Wildlife Refuge =

United States National Wildlife Refuge in Florida

- IUCN category V (protected landscape/seascape)
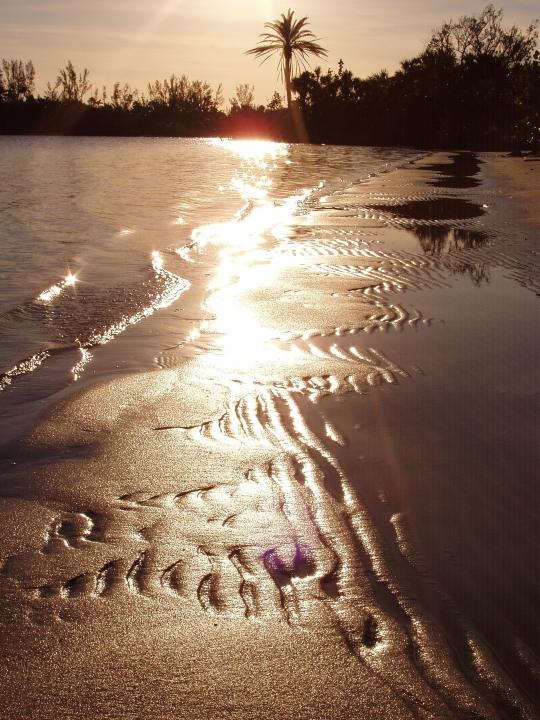
- the refuge at dawn

- Location within Florida Location within the United States
- Location: Martin County, Florida, United States
- Nearest city: Jupiter Island, Florida
- Coordinates: 27°2′26″N 80°6′49″W
- Area: 1,035 acres (419 ha)
- Established: 1969
- Governing body: US Fish & Wildlife Service
- Website: Hobe Sound National Wildlife Refuge

The Hobe Sound National Wildlife Refuge, a part of the United States National Wildlife Refuge System, is a refuge on Jupiter Island in Florida. Its official name as of 2019 is the Nathaniel P. Reed Hobe Sound National Wildlife Refuge. Part of the refuge is inside the town of Jupiter Island, while the rest is in the unincorporated areas of Martin County. The 1,035-acre (4.19 km^{2}) refuge was established in 1969, to protect the loggerhead and green sea turtles. It is administered as part of the Arthur R. Marshall Loxahatchee National Wildlife Refuge.

Within the refuge is the 173-acre (0.70 km^{2}) Reed Wilderness Seashore Sanctuary, designated a National Natural Landmark in November 1967. Additionally, there are nature trails that exhibit three distinct habitats including the sand pine scrub, coastal hammock and the protected beach, plus and indoor area which displays several of the native species.

== Scrub habitat protection ==
Hobe Sound National Wildlife Refuge is home to around 40 species which are listed as either endangered, threatened or others, giving the health of the scrub habitat a higher level of importance. They manage this habitat by trimming the trees, in order to prevent unwanted forrest fires, or by making use of controlled fires. These methods insure that the environment is as habitable as possible for native fauna and flora.

== Turtle nesting ==
The Hobe Sound National Wildlife refuge is a nesting ground for up to four different kinds of sea turtles including: Loggerhead turtles, Leatherback turtles, Green turtles, and Kemp's Ridley turtles. These turtles are listed as federally endangered being threatened by local predators. The Hobe Sound National Wildlife refuge aims to protect sea turtle nests by neutralizing their natural predators which include raccoons and armadillos.

== Beach erosion ==
According to the Florida Department of Environmental Protection, a significant amount of coastal erosion in Florida is directly attributable to the construction and maintenance of navigation inlets.

In July 2013, approximately 200,000 cubic yards (150,000 m^{3}) of beach-quality material was dredged from the St. Lucie Inlet Federal channel and impoundment basin and placed on the downdrift beaches of Jupiter Island in the vicinity of the Hobe Sound National Wildlife Refuge, with funding provided to the U.S. Army Corps of Engineers from the U.S. Congress.

== U.S. Fish and Wildlife ==
Hobe Sound National Wildlife Refuge was established September 30, 1969. It is a coastal refuge bisected by the Indian River Lagoon into two separate tracts of land totaling over 1000 acres. The 735-acre (297 ha) Jupiter Island tract provides some of the most productive sea turtle nesting habitat in the United States, and the 300-acre (120 ha) sand pine scrub mainland tract is valued because more than 90 percent of this community type has been lost to development in Florida. Sand pine scrub habitat is restricted only to Florida and an adjacent county in Alabama.

== Hobe Sound Nature Center ==
The Hobe Sound Nature Center is a private non-profit nature center that cooperates with the U.S. Fish and Wildlife Service to conduct environmental education and awareness programs about the Hobe Sound National Wildlife Refuge. The center was founded in 1973 by and continues to receive major support from the Jupiter Island Garden Club.
