= Jupiter Ridge Natural Area =

Protected land area in Jupiter, Florida, U.S.

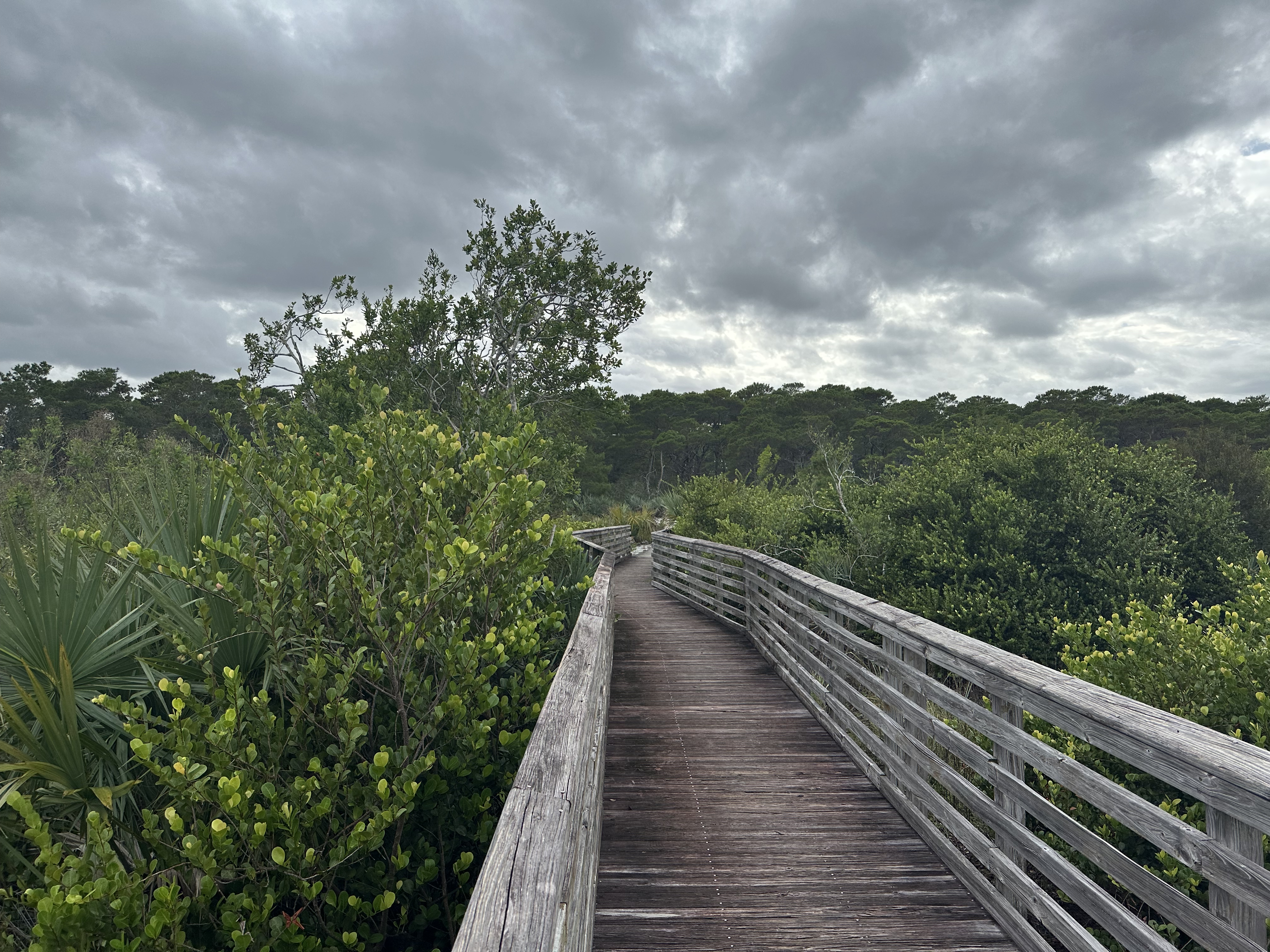
- Bridge at the Jupiter Ridge Natural Area

- Location within Florida
- Location: Palm Beach County, Florida, United States
- Nearest city: Jupiter
- Coordinates: 26°54′54″N 80°4′33.6″W
- Area: 269 acres (109 ha)
- Established: April 2001
- Governing body: Palm Beach County Department of Environmental Resources Management
- Website: https://discover.pbc.gov/erm/NaturalAreas/Jupiter-Ridge.aspx

Jupiter Ridge Natural Area is a 271-acre (110 ha) area of protected land in Jupiter, Florida, in Palm Beach County. It is located at 1800 South U.S. Highway 1. Habitats include Florida scrub, depression marsh, tidal swamp, and flatwoods.

The site has a 2.5 mile double loop trail system. One of the earliest natural areas established in densely populated Palm Beach County in 1993, it is bisected by the Atlantic Coastal Ridge, ancient dunes topped with scrub habitat.

The last known breeding pair of Scrub-Jays in Palm Beach County was sighted at Jupiter Ridge Natural Area in 2016. Only one Scrub-Jay was sighted there in 2017 and none were found in 2018 despite repeated searches.
