= Eau Gallie River =

River in Florida, United States

Coordinates: 28.1427846°N 80.68529°W

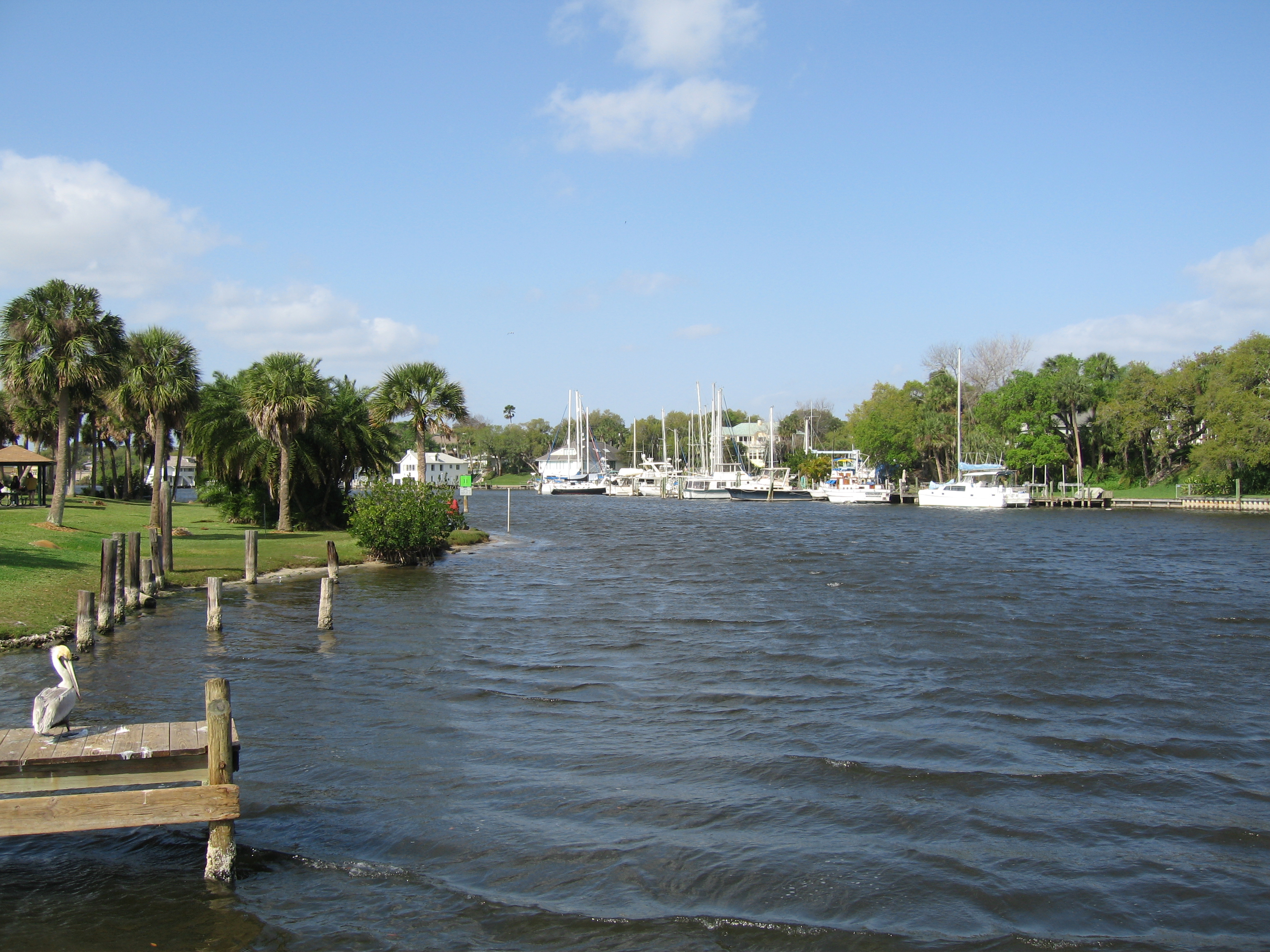
- Eau Gallie River facing west from Ballard Park

Location
- Country: United States

Physical characteristics
- Source
  - location: Eau Gallie, Florida
- Mouth
  - location: Indian River

Eau Gallie River is a 3.9-mile-long (6.3 km) river in Eau Gallie, Florida, United States. It is a tributary of the Indian River, with its mouth near Hawthorne Point.

== History ==
The Eau Gallie River was formerly named Elbow Creek. Currently, Elbow Creek is a branch and tributary of the Eau Gallie River. In 1895, a bridge was built across the Eau Gallie River. In 1907, the Eau Gallie Yacht Club was formed as yachting became highly popular in the area. In 1910, the Eau Gallie Yacht Club built a clubhouse along the Eau Gallie River and remained at that location until 1960.

In 2011, residents and people using the river complained that sediment was preventing navigation by small boats. The 625,000 cubic yards (478,000 m^{3}) of sediment was caused from nitrogen and phosphorus from fertilizers, as well as clay deposits. This sediment has killed life in the river. The Melbourne Orlando International Airport also drains into the river. A study estimates it would cost from $17.9 to $24.7 million to dredge the river. The priority for this was low.

In 2015, the ability to clean up estuaries was improved by the county taxpayers approving a half-cent sales tax. As a result, the county planned on removing 632,000 cubic yards (483,000 m^{3}) equivalent to 42,000 dump trucks worth of muck from the river, as well as from its tributary, Elbow Creek. Included in the removal is 1,200 short tons (1,100 t) of nitrogen and 260 short tons (240 t) of phosphorus.

== See also ==
- Ballard Park (Melbourne, Florida)
- Eau Gallie, Florida
- Indian River (Florida)
