= Jupiter Inlet Historic and Archeological Site =

- U.S. National Register of Historic Places
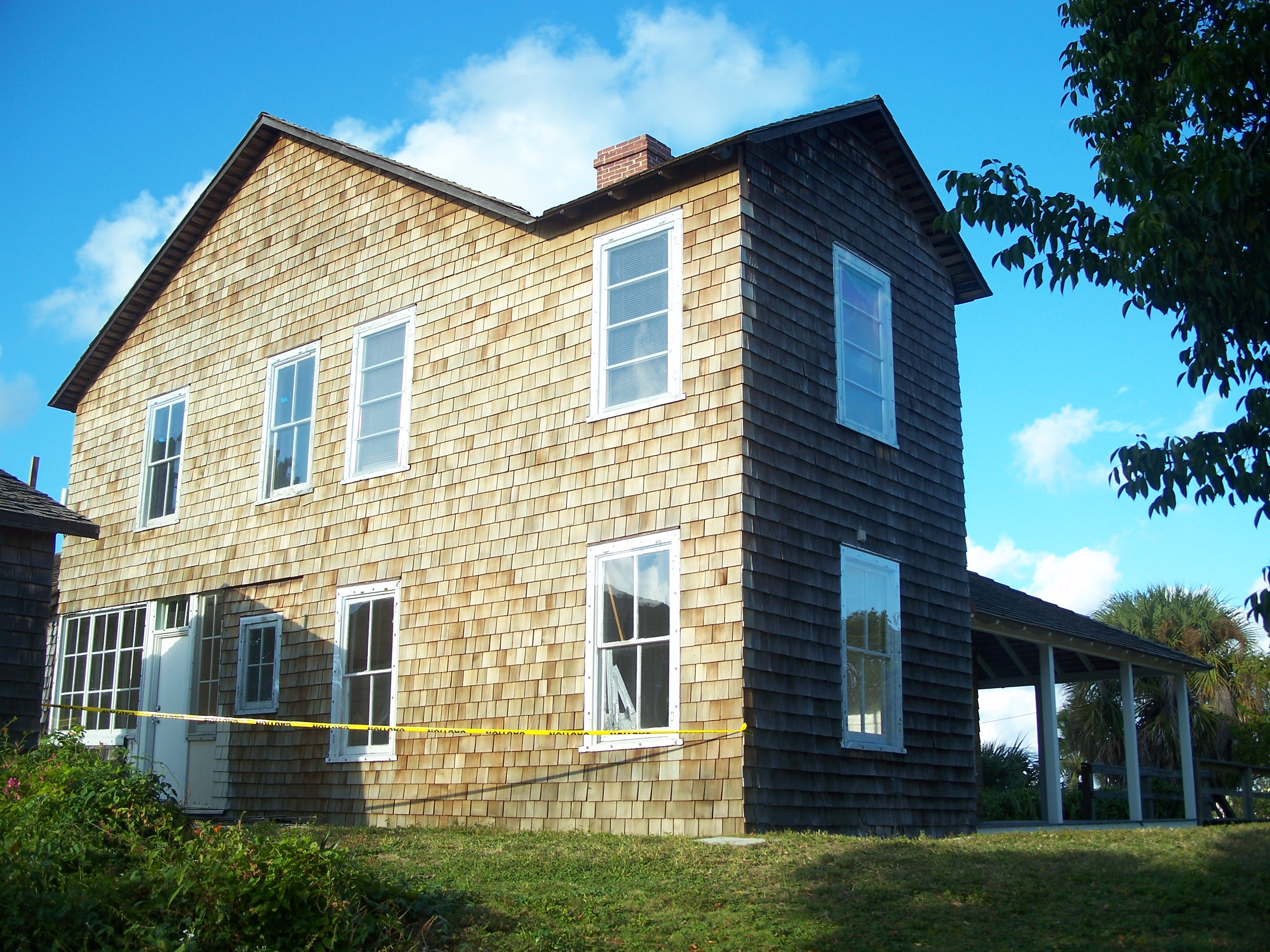
- Dubois House, on Jupiter Inlet Midden

- Location within Florida Location within the United States
- Location: Jupiter, Florida
- Coordinates: 26.94°N 80.07°W
- Area: 32 acres (0.13 km^{2})
- NRHP reference No.: 85003486
- Added to NRHP: November 5, 1985

The Jupiter Inlet Historic and Archeological Site is an archaeological site in Jupiter, Florida. It is located off A1A in the area of DuBois Park. An ancient shell midden built by the Jaega people, it was the site of the village of Hobe (or Jobe in Spanish orthography), which was later conflated with Jove and inspired the name of the town of Jupiter, Florida, where it is located. On November 5, 1985, it was added to the U.S. National Register of Historic Places.
