= Jupiter Island, Florida =

Town in Florida, United States

Town of Jupiter Island
- Town
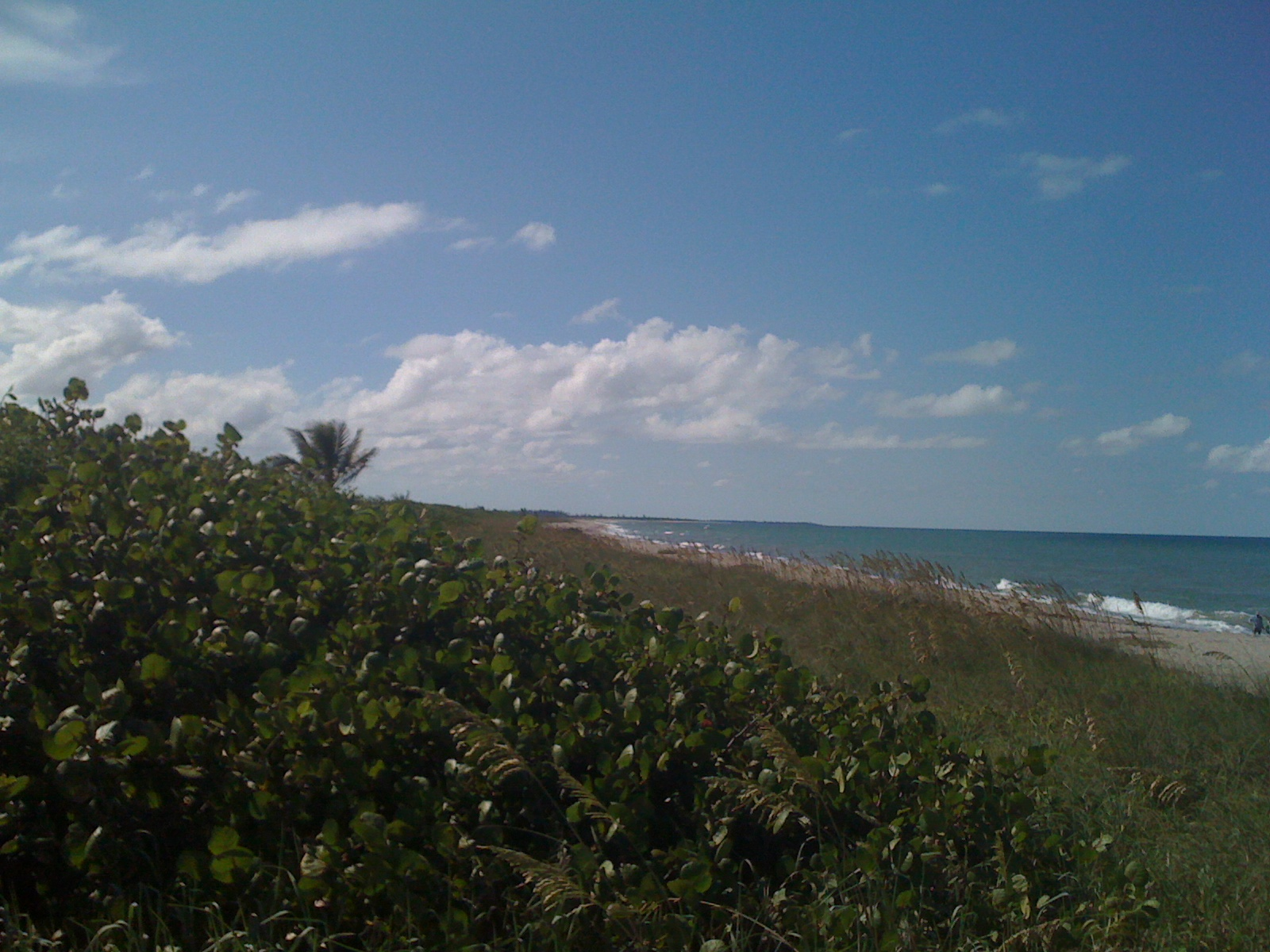
- View of the town's beachfront on Jupiter Island

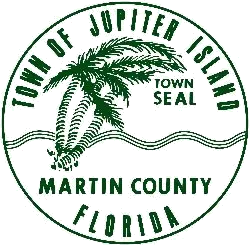
- Seal
- Interactive map of Town of Jupiter Island
- Coordinates: 27°02′40″N 80°06′35″W
- Country: United States
- State: Florida
- County: Martin
- Settled: c. 1815-1916
- Incorporated: 1953

Government
  - Type: Commission-Manager
  - Mayor: Penelope D. Townsend
  - Vice Mayor: Anne Scott
  - Commissioners: Joseph "Joe" Taddeo, Patricia "Patsy" Warner, and Marshall Field VI
  - Town Manager: Robert Garlo
  - Town Clerk: Kimberly Kogos

Area
  - Total: 3.58 sq mi (9.27 km^{2})
  - Land: 2.71 sq mi (7.02 km^{2})
  - Water: 0.87 sq mi (2.25 km^{2})
- Elevation: 0 ft (0 m)

Population (2020)
  - Total: 804
  - Density: 296.7/sq mi (114.54/km^{2})
- Time zone: UTC−5 (Eastern (EST))
  - Summer (DST): UTC−4 (EDT)
- ZIP code: 33455
- Area code: 772
- FIPS code: 12-35925
- GNIS feature ID: 2405929
- Website: townofjupiterisland.com

Jupiter Island is a town located on the barrier island also called Jupiter Island, in Martin County, Florida, United States; the town is part of Florida's Treasure Coast. It is part of the Port St. Lucie metropolitan area. The Town of Jupiter Island is located next to the unincorporated community of Hobe Sound. The population of Jupiter Island was 804 at the 2020 census.

Some of the wealthiest people in the United States live in Jupiter Island; the June 1999, issue of Worth magazine ranked it number one in the country for having the highest median home sale.

== Geography ==
It occupies the barrier island of the same name from the Palm Beach County line in the south to the Hobe Sound National Wildlife Refuge boundary in the north. It is bordered to the west by Hobe Sound and South Jupiter Narrows, and to the east by the Atlantic Ocean.

According to the United States Census Bureau, the town has a total area of 3.6 square miles (9.3 km^{2}), of which 2.7 square miles (7.0 km^{2}) are land and 0.9 square miles (2.3 km^{2}), or 24.30%, are water.

=== Climate ===
The Town of Jupiter Island has a tropical climate, similar to the climate found in much of the Caribbean. It is part of the only region in the 48 contiguous states that falls under that category. More specifically, it generally has a tropical savanna climate (Köppen climate classification: Aw), bordering a tropical monsoon climate (Köppen climate classification: Am).

== Demographics ==
Historical population
Census	Pop.	Note	%±
1960	114		—
1970	295		158.8%
1980	364		23.4%
1990	549		50.8%
2000	620		12.9%
2010	817		31.8%
2020	804		−1.6%
U.S. Decennial Census

=== 2010 and 2020 census ===
Jupiter Island racial composition (Hispanics excluded from racial categories) (NH = Non-Hispanic)
Race	Pop 2010	Pop 2020	% 2010	% 2020
White (NH)	723	719	88.49%	89.43%
Black or African American (NH)	16	9	1.96%	1.12%
Native American or Alaska Native (NH)	0	3	0.00%	0.37%
Asian (NH)	21	19	2.57%	2.36%
Pacific Islander or Native Hawaiian (NH)	0	3	0.00%	0.37%
Some other race (NH)	1	4	0.12%	0.50%
Two or more races/Multiracial (NH)	0	13	0.00%	1.62%
Hispanic or Latino (any race)	56	34	6.85%	4.23%
Total	817	804		

As of the 2020 United States census, there were 804 people, 332 households, and 194 families residing in the town.

As of the 2010 United States census, there were 817 people, 248 households, and 157 families residing in the town.

In 2010, the population density was 227.4 inhabitants per square mile (87.8/km^{2}) based on total area, and 303.4 people per square mile (117.1/km^{2}) based on land area. There were 762 housing units at an average density of 283.0 per square mile of land area (109.3/km^{2}).

In 2010, there were 248 households, of which 4.4% had children under the age of 18 living with them, 49.4% were married couples living together, 1.4% had a female householder with no husband present, one had a male householder with no wife present, and 49.0% were non-families. 42.9% of households were made up of individuals; 18.9% had someone living alone who was 65 years of age or older. The average household size was 1.74 and the average family size was 2.25.

In 2010, the age distribution was 4.0% under the age of 18, 4.3% from 18 to 24, 16.9% from 25 to 44, 27.2% from 45 to 64, and 47.6% who were 65 years of age or older. The median age was 63.7 years. For every 100 females, there were 106.3 males. For every 100 females age 18 and over, there were 103.6 males.

In 2010, the median income for a household in the town was $199,167, and the median income for a family was over $250,000 (the Census Bureau was not able to determine an exact amount). Full-time male workers had a median income of $191,000 versus $88,889 for females. The per capita income for the town was $254,260. 9.2% of the population and 2.5% of families were below the poverty line.

==== Ancestry ====
As of 2017, the largest self-reported ancestry groups in Jupiter Island are:

- English – 21.7%
- American – 12.3%
- Irish – 11.5%
- German – 9.7%
- Scottish – 6.2%
- Italian – 4.3%

=== 2000 census ===
As of the census of 2000, there are 620 people, 285 households, and 190 families residing in the town. The population density is 88.0/km^{2} (228.0/mi^{2}). There are 494 housing units at an average density of 70.1/km^{2} (181.7/mi^{2}). The racial makeup of the town is 94.35% White, 1.29% African American, 0.00% Native American, 0.16% Asian, 0.00% Pacific Islander, 2.42% from other races, and 1.77% from two or more races. 5.32% of the population are Hispanic or Latino of any race.

In 2000, there were 285 households out of which 8.1% had children under the age of 18 living with them, 66.0% were married couples living together, 0.7% had a female householder with no husband present, and 33.0% were non-families. 27.4% of all households were made up of individuals and 18.9% had someone living alone who is 65 years of age or older. The average household size was 2.03 and the average family size was 2.30.

The age distribution was 7.9% under the age of 18, 5.0% from 18 to 24, 12.6% from 25 to 44, 29.8% from 45 to 64, and 44.7% who were 65 years of age or older. The median age was 62 years. For every 100 females there were 84.5 males. For every 100 females age 18 and over, there were 86.0 males.

In 2000, the median income for a household in the town was $200,000, as was the median income for a family. Males had a median income of $156,250 versus $129,545 for females. The per capita income for the town was $200,087. 8.1% of the population and 3.1% of families were below the poverty line. Out of the total population, none were under the age of 18 and 2.7% of those 65 and older were living below the poverty line.

== Notable people ==
=== Government and business ===
- Steve Bisciotti, owner of the Baltimore Ravens and Aerotek
- Dorothy Walker Bush, wife of Prescott Bush and mother of George H. W. Bush
- George H. W. Bush, U.S. President, Director of the Central Intelligence Agency, and father of George W. Bush
- Prescott Bush, politician, founding member of the Union Banking Corporation, and father of George H. W. Bush
- Robert W. Daniel, Jr., former U.S. Congressman from Virginia
- C. Douglas Dillon, U.S. Secretary of the Treasury, and U.S. National Security Council executive
- Nelson Doubleday, publisher
- W. Averell Harriman, U.S. Ambassador to Britain and USSR, Governor of New York, and founder of Brown Brothers Harriman
- Richard Lerner, research chemist, entrepreneur, and former president of The Scripps Research Institute
- Robert A. Lovett, U.S. Secretary of Defense, partner in Brown Brothers Harriman, and member of "The Wise Men"
- Leslie Wexner, founder of Victoria's Secret, purchased Greg Norman's property in 2022
- Jock Whitney, publisher, U.S. Ambassador to Britain, and president of the Museum of Modern Art

=== Sports and entertainment ===
- Celine Dion, singer
- Alan Jackson, singer
- Greg Norman, professional golfer who sold his Jupiter Island property in April 2022 to the Leslie Wexner family
- Gary Player, professional golfer
- Nick Price, professional golfer
- Lee Trevino, professional golfer
- Tiger Woods, professional golfer
- Venus Williams, professional tennis player
- Nick Saban, former football coach for the Alabama Crimson Tide
