= DuBois Pioneer Home =

Historic residence in Jupiter, Florida, U.S.

The DuBois Pioneer Home is a historic residence, also known as the House on the Hill, in Jupiter, Florida. It was built in 1898 by Charlie Carlin for Harry and Susan DuBois. The house and the mound (midden) on which it stands are listed on the National Register of Historic Places as Jupiter Inlet Historic and Archeological Site.

The house entered Palm Beach County ownership in 1972 and was closed in 2008 following significant hurricane damage. It reopened to the public in 2016 and is believed to be the second oldest existing house in Palm Beach County.

== DuBois Park ==
DuBois Park, located on the Jupiter Inlet at 19075 DuBois Road in Jupiter, Florida is the site of a home built for a pineapple merchant. Restoration and redevelopment earned the park a 2012 award from the National Association of County Parks and Recreation Officials.

The Park is home to the Pineapple Packing House, as well as the DuBois Pioneer Home. The packing house, built in 1896, was moved to the park. It is on the western edge of the park and is older than the more well known house.

South of the park is a smaller home that Harry DuBois' son Henry had built for his mother. That cottage remained in the family until 2012.

== See also ==
- National Register of Historic Places listings in Palm Beach County, Florida
