= St. Lucie Inlet Preserve State Park =

State park in Florida, United States

- IUCN category IV (habitat/species management area)
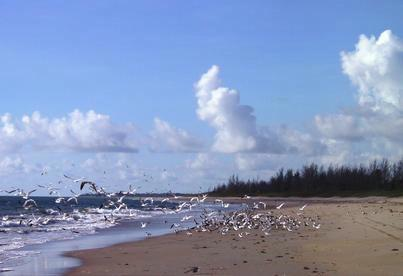
- Beach scenery

- Location within Florida Location within the United States
- Interactive map of St. Lucie Inlet Preserve State Park
- Location: Martin County, Florida, USA
- Nearest city: Port Salerno, Florida
- Coordinates: 27°08′42″N 80°09′18″W
- Area: 928 acres (3.76 km^{2})
- Governing body: Florida Department of Environmental Protection

St. Lucie Inlet Preserve State Park is a Florida State Park east of Port Salerno on the northern end of Jupiter Island and is accessible only by boat. Activities include snorkeling and scuba diving, swimming, sunbathing, fishing, and picnicking and wildlife viewing.

Among the wildlife of the park are migratory birds such as the Peregrine falcon, Broad-winged hawk and the American kestrel, as well as bobcats, otters, raccoons. Amenities include more than 2 miles (3.2 km) of sandy beach, a 3,000-foot (910 m) boardwalk, and 8 picnic tables.

== Hours ==
Florida state parks are open between 8 a.m. and sundown every day of the year (including holidays).

== Gallery ==
Dock at the preserve

View of the Intracoastal Waterway

Island vegetation
