= Ponce de León Island =

Barrier island in Florida, United States

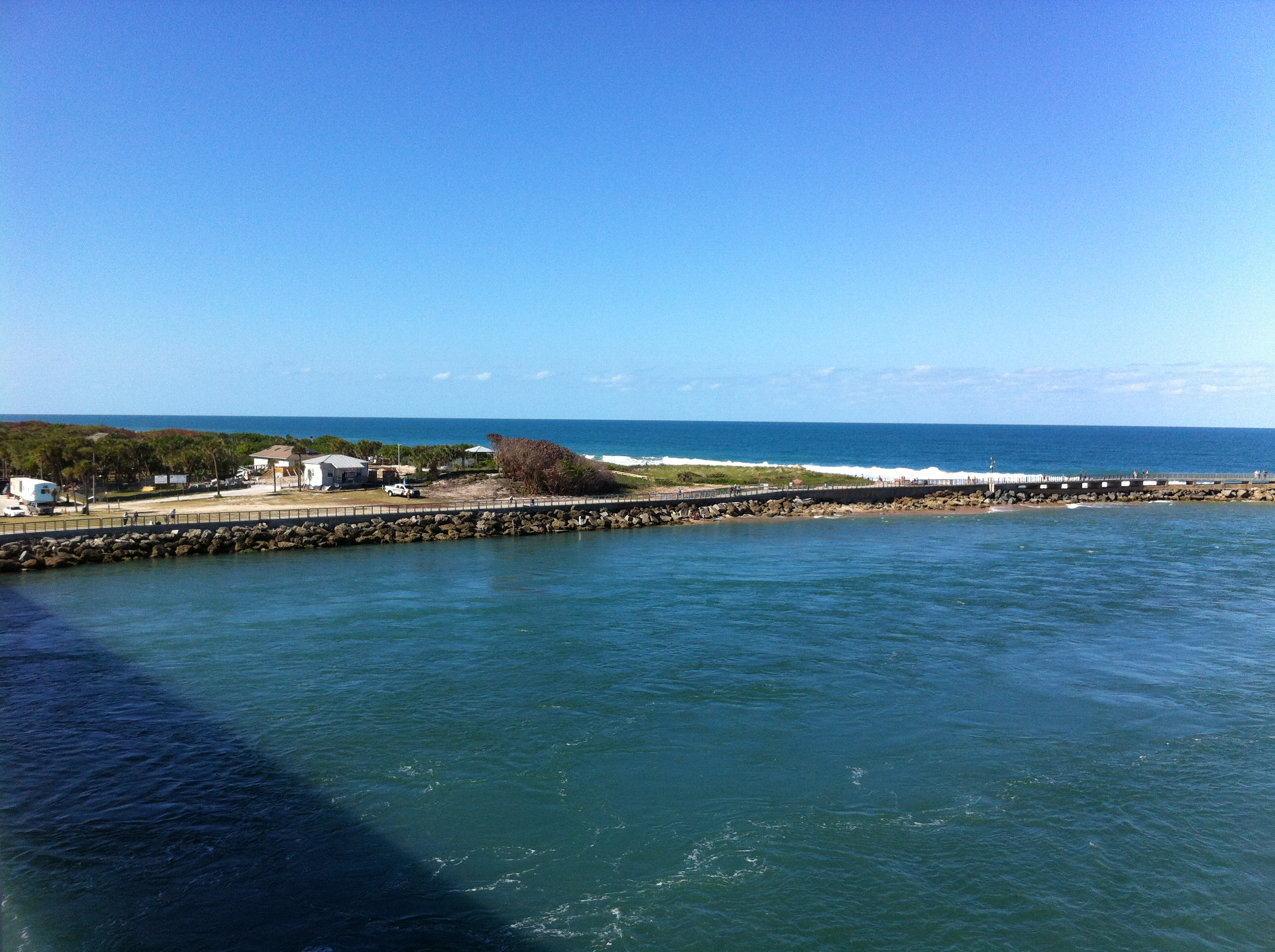
- The southern end of the island at Sebastian Inlet

- Ponce de León Island Ponce de León Island (North Atlantic)

Geography
- Location: North Atlantic
- Coordinates: 28°04′06″N 80°33′37″W
- Area: 55 km^{2} (21 sq mi)
- Length: 72.5 km (45.05 mi)

Administration
- United States
- County: Brevard County

Ponce de León Island was a proposed name for the 45 miles (72 km) long barrier island stretching from Cape Canaveral to Sebastian Inlet in Brevard County in central Florida, located on the Atlantic Ocean. The population was 67,933 at the 2010 United States census. The barrier island is 21.4 square miles (55 km^{2}). Another proposed name for this area was Ais Island after the native Ais people who originally inhabited the area. As of 2026, the island has not been designated with an official name.

== History ==
Beginning in 2000, historians from Brevard County worked to name this stretch of land to Ponce de León Island due to a theory originated by Douglas Peck that the Spanish explorer and soldier Juan Ponce de León first landed there in 1513 as the first European to set foot in Florida. This contests the once popular view that Ponce de León first landed in St. Augustine. The American Indian Association of Florida also proposed the name Ais Island for this area, sparking a controversy. Both proposals were considered by the U.S. Board on Geographic Names (BGN) in 2012, but no name was approved.

Many beach-side cities who were formally for the naming of Ponce de Leon have since rescinded their previous decisions based on the revelation of old evidence of Ponce's treatment of the Taino Indians in Puerto Rico and that Peck's theory is not universally accepted as fact.

== Pros and cons ==
Arguments against naming the barrier island include claims that Ponce de León was actively involved in the Higuey massacre in Hispaniola. and then in 1508 chosen by the Spanish Crown to lead the conquest and exploitation of Puerto Rico and the enslavement of the native Taino people there, for gold mining operations.

== Ais Island ==
There is a proposal with USGS to name the formentioned barrier islands, Ais Island. The reasoning is that this name is more historically accurate than the name Ponce de Leon. The Ais and their ancestors lived in this area for 3000 years. It was named The Province of Ais by the Spanish in the 17th century. In 1601 the Spanish king commissioned a map of Florida indicating his desires for a fort to be built in Miami. On the map he indicated the land we know as Brevard County as the 'Province of Ais', as it was typical in those days to designate a region of specific tribal domination and generally took its name from the ruling cacique.

== Coacoochee Island ==
A third naming application was submitted to the BGN by the Miccosukee Simanolee Nation (Note: The Council of the Original Miccosukee Simanolee Nation Aboriginal People is an organization of traditional Seminoles in Florida that has not been recognized by Florida or the United States.) in 2012 to name the island in honor of the Seminole chief Coacoochee.

== See also ==
- South Beaches
- North Hutchinson Island (sometimes called Orchid Island) -- the barrier island immediately to the south
