= Surruque =

Early historic ethnic group in Florida

Total population
- Extinct as tribe

Regions with significant populations
- Around the Mosquito Lagoon and along the Atlantic coast north from the Cape up to near Ponce de Leon Inlet, Florida

Languages
- Timucua language

Religion
- Native

Related ethnic groups
- Ais

The Surruque people lived along the middle Atlantic coast of Florida during the 16th and 17th centuries. They may have spoken a dialect of the Timucua language, but were allied with the Ais. The Surruque became clients of the Spanish government in St. Augustine, but were not successfully brought into the Spanish mission system.

== Demography ==
The Surruque lived around the Mosquito Lagoon (called Surruque Lagoon by the Spanish), near Cape Canaveral, and along the Atlantic coast north from the Cape up to near Ponce de Leon Inlet. The northern limit of Surruque territory was Turtle Mound, which was called "Surruque" in the early 17th century. To the north of Surruque territory was the territory of the Timucua-speaking town of Nocoroco, at the mouth of the Tomoka River. Its territory extended south of the Ponce de Leon Inlet to Caparaca, near present-day New Smyrna Beach. The northern boundary of Surruque territory was around Turtle Mound. The province of Ais was to the south of the Surruque, along the Indian River. The Mayaca and Jororo people lived to the west of the Surruque, in the St. Johns River valley.

The language of the Surruque is unknown. While some authorities state that the Surruque probably spoke a dialect of Timucua, Hann notes that there is some evidence that the Surruque language was related to the Ais language.

== History ==
The French, in their brief occupation of northeastern Florida around Fort Caroline, reported hearing of a place named Sorrochos or Serropé, said to be next to a large lake of the same name, which they placed in the interior of southern Florida. Swanton states that location is much too far to the south and east, and understood the "large lake" to be one of the lagoons near Cape Canaveral. The Spanish drove the French out of Florida in 1565, and established St. Augustine that year. The Spanish largely ignored the peoples of the coast south of St. Augustine, including the Surruque, for some 30 years after the city was established. In 1595 the Spanish took steps to secure control of that coast. The chief of Surruque, along with the chief of Ais, traveled to St. Augustine, and agreed to allow missionaries into their lands, to provide parties of laborers to St. Augustine, and to report any non-Spanish ships or men along the coast.

In 1597, during a revolt in the Guale province, the Ais refused to allow Spanish ships to land. In retaliation, Timucua Indians allied with the Spanish attacked the Surruque, killing 60 and taking 54 men, women, and children back to St. Augustine as slaves. A royal order in 1600 freed all Indian slaves. The freed Surruque were settled on an island near St. Augustine. In 1599, Juan Ramirez de Contreras, who spoke Ais, was sent to teach the Surruque and Ais, but he was killed by the Surruque before he reached Ais territory. Alvaro Mexia, a Spanish soldier from St. Augustine, stayed with the Surruque Indians for 8 days in 1605, waiting for permission to continue on a diplomatic mission to the Ais. Also in 1605, the Surruque and Ais sent men to help the Spanish repel French raiders in Guale. At least one mission may have been established close to Surruque, and Spanish cattle ranches were established along the coast as far south as Surruque.
