= Santa Lucia (Spanish Florida) =

Short-lived fort in Spanish Florida

Santa Lucía was a presidio (fort) established by Pedro Menéndez de Avilés, one of a series of presidios along the coast of Spanish Florida intended to prevent France and other European powers from planting colonies. Starting in late October 1565, Menéndez lead an expedition down the east coast of Florida from St. Augustine with goals of capturing French soldiers and sailors who were shipwrecked near Cape Canaveral and establishing presidios along the coast to enforce Spanish control of Florida. Having captured the French at Cape Canaveral and destroyed a fort they were building, Menéndez established a presidio near the chief town of the Ais in November 1565. That presidio was abandoned a month later and the "Presidio Santa Lucía" was established in December 1565 further south on the coast of Florida. The presidio was abandoned four months later in March 1566.

== Background ==
After the Spanish discovered in 1565 that France had established a colony at Fort Caroline in Florida, Philip II commissioned Menéndez to found a colony and expel the French from Florida. A French fleet under the command of Jean Ribault brought supplies and reinforcements to Fort Caroline in early September 1565. Menéndez reached Florida and founded St. Augustine just a few days later, on September 8, 1565, on a site 48 miles (77 km) from Fort Caroline. The French attempted to attack St. Augustine using Ribault's fleet, arriving off St. Augustine on September 11. A storm, which may have been a hurricane, struck the area on September 12, scattering the fleet. Realizing that the storm would prevent the French fleet from returning to Fort Caroline, Menéndez led 500 men overland to attack the French fort and captured it.

The French fleet had suffered grievously in the storm. Three large ships had foundered and broken up near the Ponce de Leon Inlet, with the loss of many men. The fleet's flagship, Trinité, remained intact, but grounded near Cape Canaveral. The survivors of the wrecks at Ponce de Leon Inlet and separately, those from the Trinité, began walking north along the coast in an attempt to reach Fort Caroline. On September 28, Menéndez learned that the survivors from the Ponce de Leon Inlet wrecks had gathered on the south side on an inlet 18 miles (29 km) south of St. Augustine. Taking the French as prisoners, the Spanish ferried them across the inlet in small numbers and then, with the exception of a few who professed to be Catholic, killed them. (Note: Most of the French on the fleet, as well as at Fort Caroline, were Huguenots, whom the Spanish regarded as heretics.) On October 11, Menéndez returned to the inlet after learning that the survivors of the Trinité had reached it. On learning what had happened to the survivors who had earlier reached the inlet, about half of the French turned back to the south. The remainder were again ferried across the inlet in small groups and, with a few exceptions, killed. These killings gave the name Matanzas ("killings") to the inlet.

== Cape Canaveral ==
Late in October 1565, word reached St. Augustine that many survivors from the French shipwrecks had gathered near Cape Canaveral, and that the French were building a fort. On October 26, Menéndez left St. Augustine with 300 men, most of whom proceeded by land, and three boats to find the shipwrecked French. (Note: Gonzalo Solís de Merás, brother-in-law and nephew-in-law of Menéndez (his sister Ana María was married to Menéndez, he was married to Menéndez's niece Francisca de Quirós) served with Menéndez in Florida, and left a manuscript describing Menéndez's live and activities in Florida.) Besides ending the French threat to Florida, Menéndez intended to find a location for establishing a presidio (Note: Menéndez established ten presidios in Spanish Florida between 1565 and 1569, placed at strategic locations ranging from Santa Elena (on Paris Island, South Carolina) to Tocobago (on Tampa Bay). Most of the presidios were destroyed or abandoned within three years. Only St. Augustine was permanent while Santa Elena lasted 20 years.) and to search for his son. (Note: Juan Menéndez's ship had been lost in a hurricane, reportedly near Cape Canaveral, in 1563 while sailing from Havana to Spain with the treasure fleet. Menéndez hoped that his son had reached Florida and was being held captive there.) The French had built a fort of earth reinforced with wood from the Trinité and had mounted six cannon salvaged from the ship on the walls. They were also building a boat with timbers from the Trinité. When the Menéndez expedition reached the fort on November 1 the French retreated into nearby woods. Menéndez sent a messenger after the Frenchmen offering them safety if they would surrender. About 75 (per Lyon) or 150 (per Solís) of the French surrendered, but 20 retreated from the fort and refused to come in. Menéndez burned the fort and the boat the French had been building, and buried the cannon that the French had salvaged from the Trinité shipwreck.

== Ais ==
After burning the fort, the Menéndez expedition then traveled south about 15 leagues along the Banana River and Indian River to the chief town of the Ais people. The Spanish were welcomed by the Ais chief, and Menéndez induced the chief to swear loyalty to Philip II. While at Ais, Menéndez traveled 15 leagues south to inspect a harbor that the Ais chief said was a good place for a settlement, but Menendez did not like it and returned to Ais.

The Spanish had brought rations for 40 days with them. As the French prisoners had been given equal rations, the rations were running out sooner than expected. Menéndez decided to sail to Havana to procure supplies for the expedition, taking two boats, 50 Spanish soldiers, and 20 French prisoners. He left the bulk of his company, 200 soldiers plus the French prisoners, with the Ais. Before leaving, Menéndez moved his men three leagues south of either the Ais town or the River of Ais inlet, to a place called Puerto de Socorro ("Port of Succor"), to prevent conflict between the Spanish and the Ais, and left Captain Juan Vélez de Medrano in charge. Authorities differ on whether the fort was on the mainland or the barrier island. This fort is also known as the Presidio of Ais.

The Ais had only fish, cocoplums and cabbage palm hearts for food, and had little to spare for the Spanish. The soldiers and prisoners left behind at the presidio supplemented their ration of a 1/2 pound (0.23 kg) of biscuit a day with cocoplums and palm hearts. One soldier is said to have eaten so many palmetto berries that he died. While Menéndez was away procuring supplies for the colony, the Spanish soldiers and French prisoners left at Ais ran short of food. They attempted to forage for food in the countryside and to seize food from the Ais, which led to attacks on the fort by the Ais.

== First mutiny ==
In early 1566, about 100 soldiers mutinied, and marched south along the coast, but were stopped when they could not cross the St. Lucie River. Captain Juan Vélez de Medrano, commander of the presidio, using a boat that had been left at the presidio, found the mutineers, and set out for Havana to obtain supplies for them. Soon after leaving the mutineers, he encountered Diego de Amaya, who had been sent by Menéndez with supplies for the Florida posts. Unfortunately, Amaya's ship had been lost at the mouth of the St. Johns River, with much of the supplies still on board, and Amaya was returning to Havana. Amaya and Vélez sailed south along the coast until they reached an inlet somewhere in the area between Salerno and Jupiter in the territory of the Jaega, where they decided to re-establish the presidio, doing so on St. Lucy's Day, December 13, 1565. Vélez moved the surviving mutineers (many had died by then) to the new location, while Amaya went to Havana. The Spanish built a blockhouse armed with cannons, the Presidio Santa Lucía.

== Presidio Santa Lucía ==
At first the Jaega people, in whose territory the new presidio was located, were willing to trade with the Spanish, but then attacked the fort, killing 16 (Lyon 1971) or 23 (Gannon) soldiers using bows and arrows against the Spanish arquebuses. Rations ran short at Santa Lucía, with just a bowlful of corn a day for each man for the last two weeks before running out completely. The garrison was reduced to chewing shoes and leather belts and eating snakes, rats, and dwarf palmettos. By this time, only 75 of the original 250 Spanish soldiers and French prisoners were still alive. One rumor said that the Spanish killed and ate French prisoners. In any case, all of the French may have died before the garrison was rescued.

Four days after the last of the corn was eaten at Santa Lucía, the Ascención arrived at Santa Lucía loaded with corn from the Yucatán. The remaining soldiers mutinied and seized the ship. Captain Velez and his ensign, Pedro de Ayala, tried to stop the mutiny, but Ayala was wounded and both were seized by the mutineers. On March 19, 1566, Menéndez was sailing towards St. Augustine when his fleet encountered the Ascension. Discovering that the ship had been seized by mutineers, and was carrying all of the survivors of the garrison at Santa Lucía, he made it return to St. Augustine with his fleet.

== Locations ==
The town of Ais was two nautical leagues (10 to 12 kilometres (6.2 to 7.5 mi)) north of the inlet called the River or Bar of Ais, which most sources assume to be the Old Indian River Inlet (which closed early in the 20th century), 4 miles (6.4 km) north of the Fort Pierce Inlet. The Beachland archaeological site (8IR16), 13 kilometres (8.1 mi) north of the Old Indian River Inlet has long been accepted as the winter (barrier island) site of Ais. (Ais towns had summer [mainland] and winter [barrier island] pairs of sites.) Most sources also place Santa Lucía at or just north of the Jupiter Inlet.

Citing evidence from the accounts of Álvaro Mexía (1605) and Jonathan Dickinson (1696), Brech & Lanham have proposed that the River of Ais was located at the Indian River Narrows opposite Winter Beach, and that the inlet closed sometime between 1715 and 1770. They note that the Indian River Narrows has geomorphological features typical of a recently closed inlet. They have also proposed that the Barker's Bluff/Kroegel Homestead archaeological site (8IR84) on the barrier island was the site of the town of Ais in the 16th and 17th centuries. Brech and Lanham state that the Presidio of Santa Lucía and the people called Santa Lucía were located much closer to Ais than to the St. Lucie River, St. Lucie Inlet, or Jupiter Inlet, likely at the Old Indian River Inlet.

== Later mentions ==
Jonathan Dickinson was on a ship that ran aground in 1696 on the coast about 5 miles (8.0 km) from the town of Jobe at the Jupiter Inlet. He expected to find a Spanish settlement called "Santa Lucea" about one degree north of there. He related that the chief of Jobe told the shipwrecked company that it was two or three days journey to the town, which was on an inlet, and that Dickinson and his companions would be killed and eaten if they went there.

Spanish missionaries reported in 1743 that remnants of a people called "Santaluces" lived two days travel north of the Miami River.

== Sources ==
- Arbesú, David (2017). "Introduction". In Arbesú, David (ed.). Pedro Menéndez de Avilés and the Conquest of Florida. Gainesville: University Press of Florida. pp. Florida. ISBN 978-0-8130-6124-5.
- Brech, Alan; Lanham, J. F. (September–December 2010). "The Location of the Paramount Town of the Ais Indians and the General Location of the Indians of Santa Lucia". The Florida Anthropologist. 63 (3–4): 115–47 – via University of Florida Digital Collections.
- Childers, Ronald Wayne (2004). "The Presidio System in Spanish Florida 1565–1763". Historical Archaeology. 38 (3): 24. doi:10.1007/BF03376651. JSTOR 25617178. S2CID 160809833.
- Dickinson, Jonathan (1700). God's protecting providence, man's surest help and defence, in times of the greatest difficulty, and most eminent danger. Evidenced in the remarkable deliverance of Robert Barrow, with divers other persons, from the devouring waves of the sea; amongst which they suffered shipwrack: and also, from the cruel, devouring jaws of the inhumane canibals of Florida (2nd ed.). Philadelphia.
- Gannon, Michael V. (1983) [1965]. The Cross in the Sand. Gainesville, Florida: University Presses of Florida. p. 44. ISBN 0-8130-0776-3.
- Lyon, Eugene (July 1971). "Captives of Florida". Florida Historical Quarterly. 50 (1): 1–14 – via State University Libraries of Florida.
- Lyon, Eugene (July 1988). "Pedro Menéndez's Strategic Plan for the Florida Peninsula". Florida Historical Quarterly. 67 (1): 1–14 – via State University Libraries of Florida.
- Lyon, Eugene (1990) [1976]. The Enterprise of Florida (2nd paperback ed.). Gainesville, Florida: University Presses of Florida. ISBN 0-8130-0777-1.
- Milanich, Jerald T. (1995). Florida Indians and the Invasion from Europe (Paperback ed.). Gainesville, Florida: University Press of Florida. ISBN 978-0-8130-1636-8.
- Solís de Merás, Gonzalo (2017). Arbesú, David (ed.). Pedro Menéndez de Avilés and the Conquest of Florida. Gainesville: University Press of Florida. pp. Florida. ISBN 978-0-8130-6124-5.
