= South Beaches =

Coordinates: 28.1374°N 80.5902°W

South Beaches is an unofficial area in Brevard County, Florida, United States. It includes cities, towns and unincorporated area on the barrier island south of Patrick Space Force Base. The cities and towns include: South Patrick Shores, Satellite Beach, Indian Harbour Beach, Indialantic and Melbourne Beach, and the city of Melbourne.

The government has historically labeled the actual beach areas differently. These names appear to be at variance with those in popular use. The "Mid Reach" includes the 7.6 miles (12.2 km) in Satellite Beach. The "South Reach" includes the 3.8 miles (6.1 km) in Indialantic and Melbourne Beach. The "South Beaches" only includes 14.5 miles (23.3 km) south of Melbourne Beach to Sebastian.

== History ==
In 1605, Alvaro Mexia reported that the winter site of the former Ais Indian town of Pentoaya was right across the lagoon on the barrier island from what is now Ballard Park. However, Vero Beach makes the same claim.

Beach replenishment is required to encourage tourism. Replenishment is planned every six years.

In 2002, $15.5 million was spent to widen the beach in Indialantic and Melbourne Beach.

There was a beach restoration project in 2005 in Indialantic to just north of Spessard Holland North Beach park, Melbourne Beach. This largely eroded a year ahead of expectation in 2009. The government is funding a $12.4 million project to replenish the 3.8 miles (6.1 km) of beachfront in 2010 for completion before May 1, the start of nesting season for the sea turtles. The federal government is contributing $7 million, the state $2.6 million, and the county $2.8 million. The project is expected to move 650,000 cubic yards (500,000 m^{3}) of sand.

The 7.8 miles (12.6 km) area south of Patrick Space Force Base to Indialantic, was skipped for fear of harming the threatened reef developing worm, sabellariids. $30 million is planned to replenish this beach from 2010 through 2013.

In 2011, alcoholic beverages were allowed on the beaches themselves in most municipalities, except Satellite Beach and Indialantic. Some parks are restricted in Indian Harbour Beach.

This stretch of barrier island is also home to Ponce de Leon Park, the site where many believe he first touched land on the North American continent.
