= Timeline of Florida history =

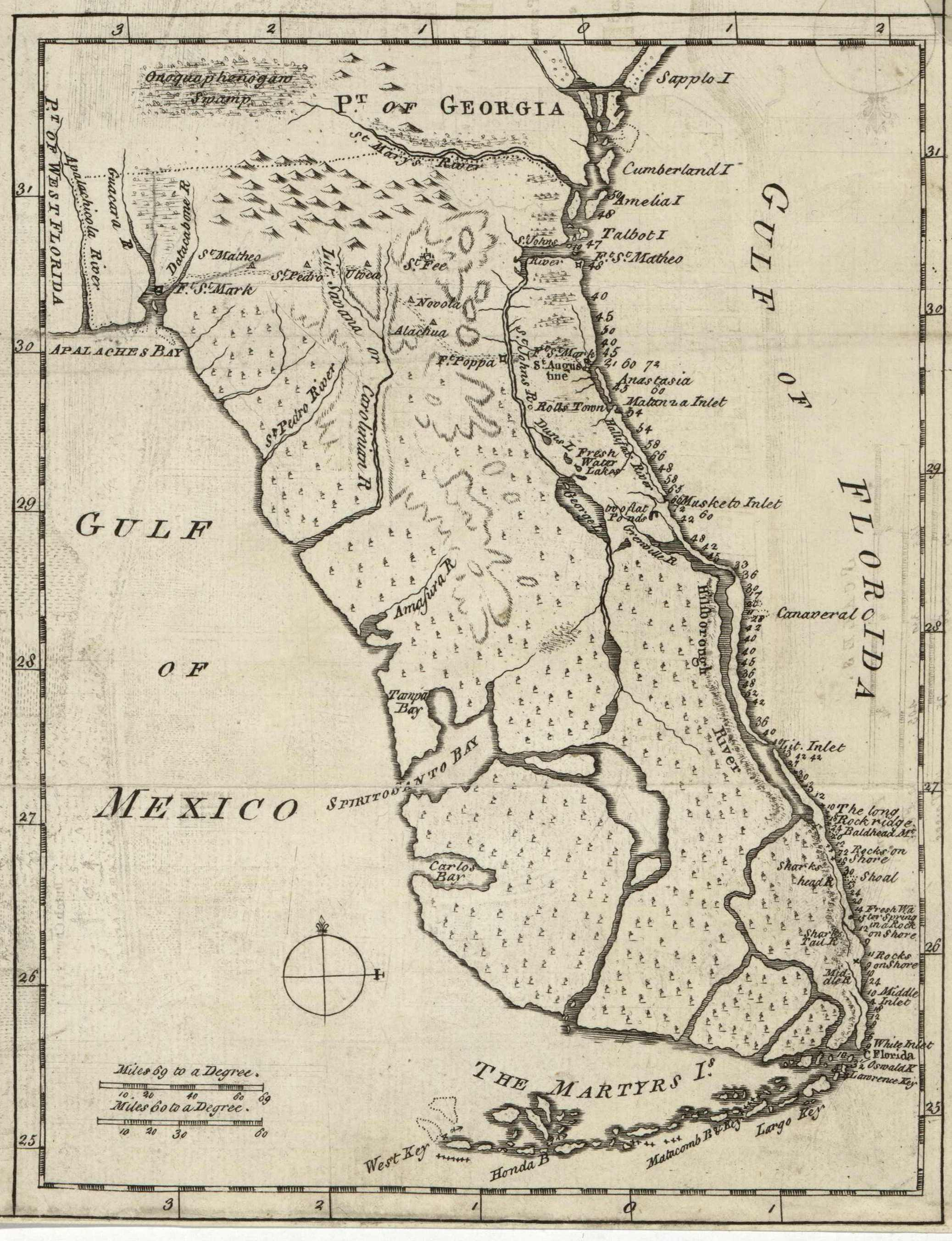
An 18th-century map of Florida

This is a timeline of the U.S. state of Florida.

== Pre-European ==
- 15,405–14,146 BC: Page-Ladson site.
- 9320 BC: Cutler Fossil Site.
- 8000 BC: Warm Mineral Springs.
- 7500 BC: Devil's Den Cave.
- 5370–5260 BC: Windover Archaeological Site.
- 3400 BC: Horr's Island burial mounds.
- Various: Populated by indigenous tribes, such as the Apalachee, Timucua, Ais, Calusa, Jaega, Mayaimi, Tequesta and Tocobaga.

== 1500s ==
- 1513 April 2: Ponce de Leon discovered Florida.
- 1515–1519: Spanish explorers visit Pinellas barrier islands while trading with Tocobaga.
- 1528: Panfilo de Narvaez expedition explores the Pinellas Peninsula.
- 1538: The horse introduced into Florida
- 1539: Hernando de Soto expedition names present Tampa Bay "La Bahia de Espiritu Santo".
- 1549: A fleet led by Tristán de Luna y Arellano anchors in Pensacola Bay and sets up the encampment of Puerto de Santa Maria.
- 1560: Menéndez commanded the galleons of the great Armada de la Carrera Española Treasure Fleet.
- 1564: Fort Caroline north of Jacksonville is established by the French.
- 1565: Pedro Menéndez de Avilés establishes the city of St. Augustine.
- 1565 September 20: Spanish attack Fort Caroline and kill most of the French, some escape.
- 1571 December: Pedro Menéndez wrecks at Cape Canaveral and meets hostile natives thought to be of the Ais Indian Nation.
- 1586 June: Sir Francis Drake attacks and sacks St. Augustine.
- 1596 March 22: Gonzalo Méndez de Canço appointed Governor and Captain General of Florida.

== 1600s ==
- 1601: King Philip III of Spain commissioned a map of Florida which includes a fort he wants built in Miami.
- 1603: Pedro Ibarra appointed Governor of Florida.
- 1605: "Period of Friendship" between Spanish and Native Tribes started because of the diplomatic trip of Alvaro Mexia.

== 1700s ==
- 1700: Settlers in the Province of Carolina and their Native American allies raid the Ais people.
- 1702–1713: Queen Anne's War. Tocobaga virtually annihilated. Raids by English colonists reach Tampa Bay. Pinellas largely deserted.
- 1715, July 30: Hurricane causes the sinking of the 1715 Treasure Fleet.
- 1743: Spanish established a short-lived mission on Biscayne Bay.
- 1739–1748: War of Jenkins' Ear. British mapping expeditions visit Pinellas Peninsula.
- 1757: Spanish expedition renames Tampa Bay "La Bahia de San Fernando", after the Spanish king; names entrance to Tampa Bay "La Punta de Pinal de Jimenez" (Point of Pines).
- 1763:
  - February 10: The French and Indian War ends with the Treaty of Paris being signed. Florida is split into West and East Florida, both territories of Britain
  - July 20: John Hedges is appointed as the first governor of East Florida.
  - August 6: Augustine Prevost is appointed as the first governor of West Florida.
- 1768: The colony of New Smyrna is established by Dr. Andrew Turnbull.
- 1783
  - March 10: Final naval battle of the American Revolution fought off Cape Canaveral with Captain John Barry.
  - October 3: Treaty of Paris ends American Revolutionary War. Britain cedes Florida to Spain.
- 1795:
  - October 27: With the Treaty of San Lorenzo, U.S. and Spain recognized the 31st parallel as the northern boundary of Florida.

== 1800–1842 ==
=== 1810s ===
- 1812: Republic of East Florida.
- 1817–1818: First Seminole War.
- 1819
  - February 22: Adams–Onís Treaty is signed between Spain and the United States.

=== 1820s ===
- 1821
  - February 22: Spain officially cedes Florida to United States as part of the Adams–Onís Treaty.
  - March 10: Andrew Jackson is appointed military governor of Florida by James Monroe.
  - July 10: José María Coppinger leaves office as the last governor of East Florida.
  - July 17: José María Callava the final Spanish and colonial governor of West Florida and Florida as a whole leaves office.
  - July 21: Escambia County and St. John's County, Florida's first two counties, are established.
  - December 31: Andrew Jackson leaves office as the governor of Florida.
- 1822
  - March 30: Florida Territory is organized combining East Florida and West Florida.
  - April 17: Florida's first civilian governor, William Pope Duval, takes office.
  - August 12: Jackson County and Duval County are established.
- 1823:
  - July 3: Monroe County is established.
  - September 18: Treaty of Moultrie Creek establishing reservation for Seminoles is signed.
- 1824:
  - St. Augustine Light, first lighthouse in Florida, is lit.
  - U.S. Army establishes Fort Brooke (later to become Tampa, Florida).
  - Tallahassee chosen as location of capital (half-way between previous capitals of East and West Florida).
  - December 29: Alachua County, Leon County, Nassau County, and Walton County are established.
- 1827
  - January 20: Jefferson County is established.
  - December 26: Hamilton County and Madison County are established.

=== 1830s ===
- 1832
  - May 9: U.S. government signs the Treaty of Payne's Landing with some of the Seminole chiefs, promising them lands west of the Mississippi River if they agreed to leave Florida voluntarily
- 1834:
  - January 25: Territorial Legislature establishes Hillsborough County, Florida.
  - April 24: John Eaton is appointed Territorial Governor of Florida by Andrew Jackson.
- 1835–1842: Second Seminole War.
- 1836
  - March 16: Richard K. Call is appointed Territorial Governor of Florida by Andrew Jackson.
- 1837: Fort Ann was established on the eastern shore of the Indian River in what is now Brevard County.
- 1838
  - January 26: Calhoun County is established.
- 1839
  - December 2: Robert R. Reid is appointed territorial governor of Florida by Martin Van Buren.

=== 1840-45 ===
- 1841
  - March 19: Richard K. Call is appointed Territorial Governor of Florida.
- 1842: Armed Occupation Act provides for land grants in unsettled parts of Florida.
- 1843
  - January 27: Hernando County is established.
  - March 11: Wakulla County is established.
- 1844
  - March 14: Marion and Brevard County are established.
  - August 11: John Branch is appointed as Governor of Florida being the last territorial governor of the state.

== Statehood era (1845–present) ==
=== 1840s ===
- 1845
  - March 3: Florida was admitted to the Union as the 27th U.S. state.
  - May 26: Florida Legislature is formed succeeding the Florida Territorial Legislative Council.
  - June 25: Florida's first elected governor, William Dunn Moseley takes office.
- 1848 January 8: Holmes County is established.
- 1849
  - January 18: Putnam County is established.
  - January 18: Tampa is first incorporated being a village.

=== 1850s ===
- 1853
  - January 8: Sumter County is established.
  - September 10: Tampa incorporates as a town.
- 1854
  - December 29: Volusia County is established.
- 1855–1858: Third Seminole War
- 1855
  - January 9: Manatee County is established.
  - December 15: Liberty County is established. Tampa incorporates as a city.
- 1856: Florida Historical Society is incorporated.
- 1858
  - December 21: Suwannee County is established.
  - December 31: Bradford and Clay County is established.

=== 1860s ===
- 1861
  - January 8 – November 23: Battle of Pensacola occurs, some historians believe this to be the first battle of the American Civil War.
  - January 10: Florida secedes from the United States.
  - February 8: Baker and Polk County are established.
  - April 22: Florida joined the Confederate States of America at the beginning of the Civil War.
  - October 8: Battle of Santa Rosa Island.
- 1862
  - March 24: Skirmish of the Brick Church.
  - June 30 – July 1: Battle of Tampa.
  - October 1–3: Battle of St. John's Bluff.
- 1863
  - October 16–18: Battle of Fort Brooke.
- 1864
  - February 24: Battle of Olustee.
  - March 1: Skirmish at Cedar Creek.
  - March 6: Battle of Natural Bridge.
  - August 17: Battle of Gainesville.
  - September 7: Battle of Marianna.
- 1865
  - February 20: Battle of Fort Myers.
- 1868
  - June 28: Florida rejoins the United States.
- 1869
  - April 14: Gainesville is incorporated.

=== 1870s ===
- 1870: Barber–Mizell feud
- 1873:
  - August 11: Tampa reincorporates a town.
- 1875:
  - July 31: Orlando is first incorporated being a town.
- 1877: Compromise of 1877 completed the withdrawal of U.S. troops from Florida (aftermath of Civil War)

=== 1880s ===
- 1883
  - May 24: Southern Bell Telephone and Telegraph Company begins operating Florida's first telephone switchboard in Jacksonville.
  - December 10: The South Florida Railroad, controlled by Henry B. Plant, becomes the first railroad to arrive in Tampa.
- 1885
  - January 1: Lakeland is incorporated.
  - February 4: Orlando is reincorporated being a city.
  - March 24: Fort Myers is incorporated.
- 1886
  - March 30: Great Fire of Key West occurs.
- 1887
  - May 12: Osceola County is established.
  - May 13: Lee County is established.
  - May 19: DeSoto County is established.
  - May 27: Lake County is established.
  - June 2: Pasco County is established.
  - July 15: Tampa reincorporates for a 5th and final time as a city.
  - August 15: Eatonville, Florida, incorporated; the first all-black town to be formed after the Emancipation Proclamation.
- 1888
  - February 22: President Cleveland's first Florida visit stop.
  - February 23: President Cleveland visits Winter Park.
- 1889
  - Legislature created a poll tax; lasts until 1937

=== 1890s ===
- 1892
  - February 29: St. Petersburg is first incorporated being a town.
- 1894 December: Great Freeze destroys much of Florida's crops (especially citrus).
- 1896
  - April 15: The Florida East Coast Railway, controlled by Henry Flagler, becomes the first railroad to arrive in Miami.
  - July 28: Miami is incorporated.

=== 1900s ===
- 1902
  - October 14: Sarasota is incorporated as a town.
- 1903:
  - May 19: Bradenton is incorporated.
  - June 6: St. Petersburg reincorporates as a city.
- 1905
  - May 24: St. Lucie County is established.
  - June 6: Clearwater is incorporated.
- 1908
  - April 5 – May 13: Pensacola streetcar strike of 1908.
  - November 8: Ocala National Forest established.
  - November 27: Choctawhatchee National Forest established.
- 1909
  - April 30: Palm Beach County is established.

=== 1910s ===
- 1911
  - March 27: Fort Lauderdale is incorporated.
- 1912
  - January 1: Pinellas County is established.
- 1913
  - April 24: Bay County is established.
  - April 25: Seminole County is established.
  - May 13: Sarasota reincorporates as a city.
- 1914
  - April 2: Saint Augustine Fire of 1914
- 1915
  - April 30: Broward County is established.
  - September 7: Okaloosa County is established.
- 1917
  - April 28: Flagler County is established.
  - May 8: Okeechobee County is established.

=== 1920s ===
- 1920s: Florida land boom.
- 1921
  - April 23: Glades, Hardee, Highland and Charlotte County are established.
  - April 25: Dixie County is established.
  - May 14: Sarasota County is established.
  - May 20: Union County is established.
- 1922
  - December 14–15: Perry massacre.
- 1923
  - January 1–7: Rosewood massacre.
  - May 8: Collier County is established.
  - May 11: Hendry County is established.
- 1925
  - May 26: Boca Raton, Florida is incorporated.
  - May 30: Martin and Indian River County is established.
  - June 6: Gulf County is established.
  - September 10: Hialeah is incorporated.
  - November 28: Hollywood, Florida is incorporated.
  - December 4: Gilchrist County is established.
- 1928
  - January 25: Overseas Highway opens for cars, connecting Key West to mainland Florida.
  - April 26: Tamiami Trail between Tampa and Miami opens to traffic.

=== 1930s ===
- 1931:
  - gambling legalized, allowing a Parimutuel betting establishment.
  - July 10: Osceola National Forest established.
  - November – December: Tampa cigar makers' strike of 1931
- 1936
  - May 13: Apalachicola National Forest established.
- 1937
  - November 15: Ku Klux Klan raid of La Paloma nightclub
  - repeal of poll tax

=== 1940s ===
- 1943 September 26: Florida's first oil well is drilled in Collier County by Humble Oil Company.
- 1947: Everglades National Park dedicated.
- 1949 March 21: The first television station in Florida begins broadcasting, WTVJ. It is the 16th TV station to start broadcasting in the United States and is the oldest station still broadcasting in the state.

=== 1950s ===
- 1950
  - January 1: Sebring International Raceway opens and holds its first race.
- 1951
  - December 25: Murder of Harry and Hariette Moore
- 1956
  - May 28 – December 22: Tallahassee bus boycott.
- 1959
  - February 22: Daytona International Speedway opens.
  - March 31: Busch Gardens Tampa Bay opens.

=== 1960s ===
- 1960
  - August 27: Ax Handle Saturday
- 1961
  - April 27: Port St. Lucie is incorporated.
- 1962 February 20: Launched from Cape Canaveral, John Glenn orbits the Earth three times with Friendship 7.
- 1963–1964: St. Augustine movement
- 1963
  - December 29: Hotel Roosevelt fire
- 1964
  - June 18: 1964 Monson Motor Lodge protests
- 1966
  - August 6: Miami Dolphins football team plays its first game.
- 1967
  - October 1: Jacksonville becomes a consolidated city-county with Duval County.
- 1968
  - Super Bowl II is held at the Miami Orange Bowl between the Green Bay Packers and the Oakland Raiders. It is the first Super Bowl championship to be played in Florida. This is also one of only two Super Bowl championships to be played 2 consecutive years at the same stadium.
  - May 6 – August 30: Sanitation workers go on strike in St. Petersburg. What begins as a strike later evolves into protests and then rioting.
  - August 5–8: 1968 Republican National Convention is held in Miami Beach.
  - August 7–8: 1968 Miami riot.
  - November 5: Florida ratifies a new constitution.
- 1969 July 16: Apollo 11 is launched from Kennedy Space Center, landing the first humans on the Moon 4 days later.

=== 1970s ===
- 1971 October 1: Walt Disney World opens, with Magic Kingdom as its first park.
- 1972
  - July 10–13: 1972 Democratic National Convention is held in Miami Beach.
  - August 21–23: 1972 Republican National Convention is held in Miami Beach.
- 1973 December 15: SeaWorld Orlando opens.
- 1974: Big Cypress National Preserve became the first national preserve in the United States National Park System.
- 1975 January 3: Canaveral National Seashore established.
- 1976 September 12: Tampa Bay Buccaneers football team plays its first game.

=== 1980s ===
- 1980:
  - April 15 - October 31: Emigration crisis caused by the Mariel Boatlift from Cuba.
  - May 17–20: 1980 Miami riots.
  - June 7: Adventure Island opens.
  - June 28: Biscayne National Park established.
- 1982 October 1: The Walt Disney Company opens its second park in Florida, Epcot.
- 1984 May 20: Metrorail begins operating in Miami and is the first and only rapid transit/metro system in Florida.
- 1985: wreck of the Nuestra Señora de Atocha discovered off Key West, listed in the Guinness Book of World Records as being the most valuable shipwreck to be recovered.
- 1988 November 5: Miami Heat plays its first basketball game.
- 1989
  - January 16–21: 1989 Miami riot.
  - May 1: Walt Disney World opens its third park, Disney's Hollywood Studios (originally Disney-MGM Studios).
  - June 1: Walt Disney World opens its second water park, Disney's Typhoon Lagoon.
  - October 13: Orlando Magic plays its first basketball game.

=== 1990s ===
- 1990
  - June 7: Universal Studios Florida opens in Orlando.
  - October 16: Lime Street fire
  - December 3: 1990 Wynwood riot.
- 1992
  - August: Hurricane Andrew devastated areas of South Florida
  - October 7: Tampa Bay Lightning hockey team plays its first game.
  - October 26: Dry Tortugas National Park established.
- 1993: 3 professional sports teams are introduced in Florida.
  - Florida Marlins (later Miami Marlins) baseball team
  - Jacksonville Jaguars football team
  - Florida Panthers hockey team.
- 1996
  - October/November: St. Petersburg, Florida riots of 1996
- 1998
  - March 31: Tampa Bay Rays baseball team plays its first game as the Tampa Bay Devil Rays.
  - April 22: Walt Disney World opens its fourth park, Disney's Animal Kingdom.
- 1999 May 28: Universal Studios opens its adjacent park, Islands of Adventure

=== 2000s ===
- 2000 November 7–December 12: Disputed Florida ballots in the United States presidential election delay the results of the overall national result.

=== 2010s ===
- 2011 October 15: Legoland Florida opens in Winter Haven, Florida.
- 2012 July 18–21: 2012 Republican National Convention is held in Tampa.
- 2014: Florida becomes the United States' third-most populous state.
- 2016
  - May 26–30: 2016 Libertarian National Convention is held in Orlando.
  - June 12: Pulse nightclub shooting occurs in Orlando, one of the deadliest mass shootings in American history.
- 2018
  - February 14: Majory Stoneman Douglas High School shooting occurs, the deadliest high school shooting in United States history.

=== 2020s ===
- 2020
  - August 24–27: Planned date of the 2020 Republican National Convention in Jacksonville; replaced with a virtual online convention due to the COVID-19 pandemic.
- 2021
  - Super Bowl LV is hosted at Raymond James Stadium in Tampa.

== See also ==
- Timelines of cities in Florida
- List of Florida state legislatures
