= Ais people =

Extinct Native American Tribe of Eastern Florida

Ais
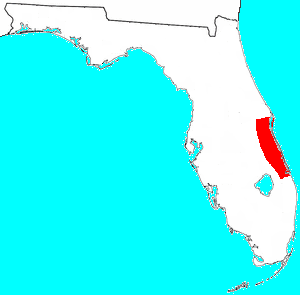
- Approximate territory of the Ais tribe in the late 17th century.

Total population
- Extinct as tribe

Regions with significant populations
- Cape Canaveral to the Indian River

Languages
- Ais

Related ethnic groups
- Surruque, Mayaca, Guacata, Jaega

The Ais or Ays were a Native American people of eastern Florida. Their territory included coastal areas and islands from approximately Cape Canaveral to the Indian River. The Ais chiefdom consisted of a number of towns, each led by a chief who was subordinate to the paramount chief of Ais; the Indian River was known as the "River of Ais" to the Spanish. The Ais were hunter-gatherers and food was plentiful. They ate fish, turtle, shellfish, cocoplums, sabal palm berries and other gathered fruits. The best single source for information on the Ais at the end of the 17th century is Jonathan Dickinson's Journal, in which he makes observations on their appearance, diet, and customs. Dickinson and his party were shipwrecked, and spent several weeks among the Ais in 1696. By Dickinson's account, the chief of the town of Jece, near present-day Sebastian, was paramount to all of the coastal towns from the Jaega town of Jobe (at Jupiter Inlet) in the south to approximately Cape Canaveral in the north (that is, the length of the River of Ais).

== Name and language ==
The Spanish recorded the name of the people, province, chief town, and lagoon as "Ais" or "Ays". Jonathan Dickinson, who, along with his fellow shipwreck survivors, was held at the chief town for a month in 1697, recorded the name as "Jece". Bernard Romans derived "Ais" from the Mvskokē isi ("deer"), but Swanton says there is no basis for that. The Ais language has been linked to the Chitimacha language by linguist Julian Granberry, who points out that "Ais" means "the people" in the Chitimacha language. Although nothing is known about the language of the Ais, Spanish reports suggest that the Ais, the Surruque, who lived along the coast to the north from near Cape Canaveral to near the Ponce de Leon Inlet, the Mayaca (possibly including the otherwise obscure Macoya and Mayajueca), who lived along the upper St. Johns River south of Lake George, the Jaega, who lived south of the Ais in present day Martin County and northern Palm Beach County, and the Guacata, who lived east of Lake Okeechobee, all spoke the same language. Hernando de Escalante Fontaneda, who was held captive for 17 years by the Calusa, suggested that, other than the Surruque, all of those people were part of the Ais polity. The similarity of place names and other evidence further suggests that the Ais spoke the same unknown language as the Calusa and other peoples in southernmost Florida, although Fontaneda stated that he did not know the language of Ais and Jaega.

== Malabar culture ==
The Malabar culture or Indian River culture was an archaeological culture practiced by the ancestors of the Ais people. Archaeologists have defined an Indian River culture region that extends along the Atlantic Coast from the northern end of the Indian River to the St. Lucie Inlet, a distance of about 190 miles (310 km), and inland to include the upper St. Johns River basin, with an average width of about 50 miles (80 km). Archaeologists have further defined the post-Archaic Malabar culture that was practiced in much of the Indian River culture region. Archaeologists differ on whether the Malabar culture or Indian River culture was a distinct culture or was transitional between the St. Johns culture of northern Florida and the Glades culture of southern Florida. One definition of the St. Johns culture includes all of the Florida Atlantic coast north of the St. Lucie Inlet, all of the St. Johns River watershed, and the lakes district of Lake, Orange, and Seminole counties. The Malabar culture has been divided into the Malabar I and Malabar II periods on the basis of the relative abundance of pottery types, with Malabar II dated from 1000 to 1763, although there is a lack of radiocarbon dating of archaeological finds in the region to support assigned dates. The ceramic tradition in the Indian River region has deep roots, with a continuity of development from the late Archaic Orange period through Malabar II, from approximately 2000 BCE to after 1700 CE. (Rouse divided the history of the Indian River culture region into Preceramic, Orange, Malabar I, Malabar I', Malabar II, St. Augustine, and Seminole periods.)

The number of archaeological sites in the St. Johns River valley gradually decreased from the late Archaic through to the historic period, while the number of such sites on the barrier islands (including Merritt Island) increased over the same period. Pender attributes this shift to a rising sea level, which would have raised the water level in the Indian River Lagoon, increasing the fish population in the lagoon, while increased rainfall would have caused flooding in the upper St. Johns River. Penders argues that the coastal and St. Johns River populations were separate, although there may have been seasonal movement between barrier islands and the river south of the southern end of Merritt Island. Very few non-local artefacts have been found at pre-Columbian sites in the Indian River region, compared to those found at St. Johns culture sites to the north, indicating that the region was isolated from the trade networks that connected other peoples in Florida to regions as far north as the Great Lakes. Early in the 16th century, however, the Ais gained access to large quantities of European goods, including gold and silver, as Spanish ships returning to Spain wrecked along the coast adjacent to the Indian River Lagoon.

=== Mounds ===
Low mounds of sand or a sand and shell mixture were common in the Malabar culture area, generally located close to settlements. Mounds typically were used for burials, as were some middens. Burials in Malabar mounds were not accompanied by grave goods, and there is no indication of status differences in the burials. A few mounds held circular or "wheel-spoke" burials, with up to 50 skeletons all with their heads pointing towards the center of the mound. A few other mounds with radial or "wheel-spoke" burial have been found elsewhere in Florida, including in Alachua, Miami-Dade, Pasco, Sarasota, and Volusia counties. Artifacts found scattered in the mounds date from 900 to the historic period.

There are reports of terraced ridges and platforms at some sites, including some ramps. The reported structures are not mentioned in historic sources, and the sites have not been excavated by archaeologists, and have mostly been modified by development, so that when they were created, or even if they are artificial, has not been determined.

A burial mound, used by the Ais tribe for 500 to 1,000 years rises about twenty feet in Old Fort Park on Indian River Drive in Fort Pierce. This location later became an Army fort used during the Second Seminole War (1838–1842) and it may be the location of a Spanish settlement, mission and military outpost dating back to 1567. The burial mound is several hundred feet around. The Indian River (called the "Rio de Ais" by the Spanish colonizers) flows by within sight.

== Political and social organization ==
The settlement pattern of the people of the Malabar culture, and of the Ais, included a few central villages that were the seats of chief, scattered households, and temporary camps for gathering resources in season. In the late 16th century, the Spanish were aware of four settlements in the Indian River region that were the seats of Ais chiefs: Perucho in the headwaters of the St. Johns River, Ais near the Ais Inlet in the Central portion of the Indian River, Ulumay on the Banana River, and Guacata, on the St. Lucie River.

== Spanish contacts ==
=== Oathchaqua ===
Two Spaniards, possible survivors of a 1549 shipwreck in the Florida Keys, were ransomed in 1564 by the French at Fort Caroline from chiefs named Oneatheaqua and Mathiaca. They had been sent to the chiefs by Calos of the Calusa. One of the Spaniards had served as a messenger between Calos and Oathchaqua (or Oathkaqua), chief of the Ais, who lived in a town north of Cape Canaveral, near the northern end of the Ais province. He reported that Oathchaqua was allied with Calos, and had sent his daughter to marry Calos, possibly in 1556, but she and her companions had been captured by the people living on an island in a lake called Serrope.

=== Menéndez visit ===
In 1565 Pedro Menéndez de Avilés, founder of St. Augustine, Florida, led an expedition down the east coast of Florida, visiting the chief town of the Ais people in November. The Spanish were welcomed by the Ais chief, and Menéndez induced the chief to swear loyalty to Philip II. While at Ais, Menéndez traveled 15 leagues south to inspect a harbor that the Ais chief said was a good place for a settlement, but Menendez did not like it and returned to Ais.

Menéndez decided to sail to Havana to procure supplies for the expedition. He left the bulk of his company, 200 soldiers plus a number of French prisoners, with the Ais. Before leaving, Menéndez moved his men three leagues south of Ais to a place called Puerto de Socorro ("Port of Succor") to prevent conflict between the Spanish and the Ais. This fort is also known as the Presidio of Ais. While Menéndez was away procuring supplies for the colony, the Spanish soldiers and French prisoners left at Ais ran short of food. They attempted to forage for food in the countryside and to seize food from the Ais, which led to attacks on the fort by the Ais.

In December, about 100 soldiers mutinied, and marched south along the coast. Captain Juan Vélez de Medrano, commander of the presidio, found the mutineers, and moved them to the territory of the Jaega, where the Presidio Santa Lucia was established on St. Lucy's Day, December 13, 1565.

=== Later Spanish contact ===
Oathaqua was a major chief of the Ais. Governor Mendez de Canco reported in 1597 that this chief led more people than any other tribe.

Spain eventually established some control over the coast; at first, the Ais considered them friends (comerradoes) and non-Spanish Europeans as enemies. A number of Ais men learned some Spanish, and a patrol of Spanish soldiers from St. Augustine arrived in Jece while the Dickinson party was there. One Ais man in Jece had been taken away by the English to work as a diver on a wreck east of Cuba. He got away when the ship put in for water in Cuba, and made his way back to his home via Havana and St. Augustine.

=== Pedro's bluff ===
In December of 1571, Pedro Menéndez de Avilés was sailing from Florida to Havana with two frigates when, as he tells it,

I was wrecked at Cape Canaveral because of a storm which came upon me, and the other boat was lost fifteen leagues further on in the Bahama Channel, in a river they call the Ais, because the cacique is so called. I, by a miracle reached the fort of St. Augustine with seventeen persons I was taking with me. Three times the Indians gave the order to attack me, and the way I escaped them was by ingenuity and arousing fear in them, telling them that behind me many Spaniards were coming who would slay them if they found them.

=== Enslavement, war, and disease ===
In 1605, Governor Pedro de Ibarra sent a soldier, Álvaro Mexía, on a diplomatic mission to the Ais nation. The mission was a success; the Ais agreed to care for shipwrecked sailors for a ransom, and Mexía completed a map of the Indian River area with their help. Numerous European artifacts from shipwrecks have been found in Ais settlements. When the Dickinson party reached the town, there was already in Jece another group of English from a shipwreck. European and African survivors of shipwrecks were fairly common along the coast. The Ais also traded with St. Augustine. Dickinson reports that one man of Jece had approximately five pounds of ambergris; he "boasted that when he went for Augustine with that, he would purchase of the Spaniards a looking-glass, an axe, a knife or two, and three or four mannocoes (which is about five or six pounds) of tobacco.

Shortly after 1700, settlers in the Province of Carolina and their Indian allies started raiding the Ais, killing some and carrying captives to Charles Town to be sold as slaves. In 1743, the Spanish established a short-lived mission on Biscayne Bay (in the area of present-day Miami). The priests assigned to that mission reported the presence of people they called "Santa Luces", perhaps a name for the Ais derived from "Santa Lucia", somewhere to the north of Biscayne Bay.

After 1703 the Ais were absorbed into the Costas tribe. Their numbers had diminished to 137 individuals by 1711. Diseases brought by the Europeans eradicated the remaining Ais/Costas by the mid-1740s. The Ais disappear from area records after 1760.

== Diet ==
The Ais did not practice agriculture, depending on fishing, collecting shellfish, and gathering wild plants for food. Jonathan Dickinson stated that the Ais "neither sow nor plant any manner of thing whatsoever," but fished and gathered palmetto, cocoplum and seagrape berries. The Ais dried some of the berries they gathered for future use:

This week we observed that great baskets of dried berries were brought in from divers towns and delivered to the king or Young Caseekey [of Jece.]

Charred acorns and palmetto seeds have been found at archaeological sites.

Evidence from archaeological sites in the Indian River region indicates that the people of the Malabar culture relied on fishing and shellfish collection in the Indian River Lagoon for most of their animal diet. Bony fish made up about 80% of the vertebrate animals consumed, including Atlantic croaker, black drum, mullet, porcupine fish, redfish, sea catfish, and sea trout. Sharks and ray were also taken in quantity, while birds, mammals, and reptiles were no more than 10% of the vertebrate animals consumed. A Spaniard shipwrecked on the Florida coast in 1595 reported that the people caught mullet by jabbing a thin stick "like a little harpoon" through the dorsal fin, never missing a fish they struck at. Dickinson, while at the Jaega town of Jobe at the southern end of the Indian River Lagoon, described a Jaega man's fishing technique:

[T]he Casseekey [of Jobe] ... sent his son with his striking staff to the inlet to strike fish for us; which was performed with great dexterity; for some of us walked down with him, and though we looked very earnestly when he threw his staff from him could not see a fish at which time he saw it, and brought it onshore on the end of his staff. Sometimes he would run swiftly pursuing a fish, and seldom missed when he darted at him. In two hours time he got as many fish as would serve twenty men[.]

The Ais boiled their fish, and ate them from 'platters' of palmetto leaf:

About noon was some fish brought us on small palmetto leaves, being boiled with scales, head and gills, and nothing taken from then [sic] but the gut[.]

The people of the Malabar culture also consumed shellfish, primarily coquina and quahog clams and oysters, but also cross-barred Venus clams, crown conchs, moon snails, and whelks. Some small shell middens are dominated by a single type of shell, while others have a mixture of types. Dickinson recorded a gift of clams to his wife:

This day the Cassekey [of Jece] ... made presents to some of us, especially to my wife; he gave her a parcel of shellfish, which are known by the name of clams; one or two he roasted and gave her, showing that she must serve the rest so, and eat them.

Dickinson does not say anything about the Ais hunting, but they used deer skins. The neighboring Jaega people of Jobe gave the Dickinson party a hog they had killed.

== Clothing ==
The Ais men wore a "loincloth" of woven palm leaves. Dickinson describes this as:

being a piece of platwork of straws wrought of divers colors and of a triangular figure, with a belt of four fingers broad of the same wrought together, which goeth about the waist and the angle of the other having a thing to it, coming between the legs, and strings to the end of the belt; all three meeting together are fastened behind by a horsetail, or a bunch of silkgrass exactly resembling it, of a flaxen color, this being all of the apparel or covering that the men wear.

He has little to say on how the women dressed, recording only that his wife and female slaves were given "raw deer skins" with which to cover themselves after their European clothing had been taken away. Women of the Tequesta tribe, to the south of the Ais, were reported to wear "shawls" made of woven palm leaves, and "skirts” made from draped fibers from the Spanish dagger (yucca), similar to the "grass" skirts of Hawai'i.

== Housing ==
Dickinson states that the town of Jece "stood about half a mile from the seashore within the land on the sound, being surrounded with a swamp, in which grew white mangrove trees, which hid the town from the sea."

Dickinson describes the cacique's house in Santa Lucea as "about forty foot long and twenty-five foot wide, covered with palmetto leaves both top and sides. There was a range of cabins, or a barbecue on one side and two ends. At the entering on one side of the house a passage was made of benches on each side leading to the cabins.

== Settlements ==
Settlements of the Ais in the Malabar II and historic periods were primarily along the shores of the Indian River Lagoon. Álvaro Mexía, who mapped the Indian River Lagoon in 1605, reported that the Ais towns had dual locations, with a mainland site occupied during the summer and a site on the barrier island occupied in the winter. Penders notes that Mexía did not stop at those settlements, and little work has been done to validate the pattern. Many sites may have been used seasonally or more rarely to exploit particular resources. Some barrier Island sites may have been occupied year-round. At the northern end of the Indian River region, settlement sites are known from the eastern (barrier island) and western (mainland) shores of the Mosquito Lagoon and on the eastern (barrier island) shore of the Banana River. On the western (Merritt Island shore of the Banana River, settlement sites are known primarily from the southern end of the island. In the northern part (north of the southern end of Merritt Island) of the Indian River proper, settlement sites are found on the eastern (Merritt Island) shore, but are rare on the western (mainland) shore. In the rest of the Indian River (south of Merritt Island), settlement sites are known on both the eastern (barrier island) and western (mainland) shores, particularly on the barrier island along the middle part of the lagoon.

== Subject and related tribes ==
People closely related to the Ais, speaking the same language, probably included the Surruque, who lived along the coast to the north from near Cape Canaveral to near the Ponce de Leon Inlet, the Mayaca (possibly including the otherwise obscure Macoya and Mayajueca), who lived along the upper St. Johns River south of Lake George, the Guacata, who lived east of Lake Okeechobee, and the Jaega, who lived south of the Ais in present day Martin County and northern Palm Beach County. The political influence of the Ais extended down the east coast of Florida to the Tequesta and into the Florida Keys during the Spanish period.

== Ais Island name proposal ==
A proposal to name the barrier island separating the Indian River Lagoon from the Atlantic Ocean "Ponce de León Island" resulted in a counter-proposal to name it "Ais Island". As of December 2012, the United States Board on Geographic Names has rejected both names for the island.

== See also ==
- List of Native American peoples in the United States
