= Mike Gruntman =

American physicist

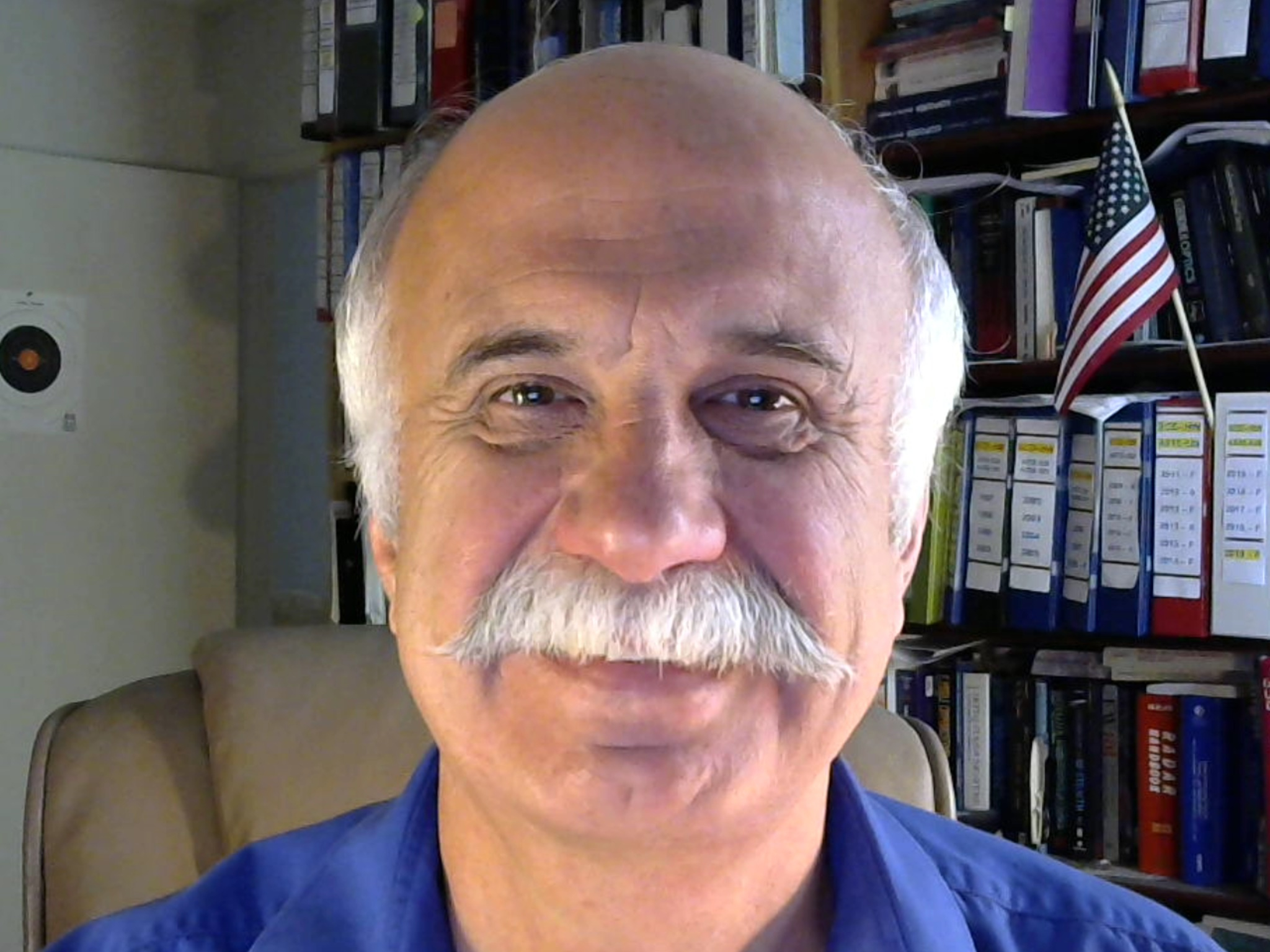
- Gruntman in 2019
- Born: 1954 (age 71–72); Soviet Union
- Education: Moscow Institute of Physics and Technology; Russian Space Research Institute
- Website: Astronauticsnow

Mike Gruntman is a Russian-American physicist, space engineer, and author. He is professor of astronautics and aerospace engineering at the Viterbi School of Engineering, University of Southern California (USC).

== Biography ==
Born in the USSR, Gruntman grew up as a child at the Soviet Tyuratam Missile Test Range, also known as Baikonur Cosmodrome, in the late 1950s and early 1960s. After graduating from Moscow Institute of Physics and Technology with a master's degree in physics, he went on to receive his Ph.D. (1984) in physics from the Space Research Institute (IKI ИКИ) of the USSR Academy of Sciences. Gruntman came to IKI as a student in 1973 and then worked there from 1977 on as a research fellow. From 1987 to 1990 he worked as a research fellow in the Institute for Problems in Mechanics (IPM) of the USSR Academy of Sciences. In March 1990 he joined USC in Los Angeles, California as research scientist and became professor in 1993.

In IKI and IPM, Gruntman worked on position-sensitive detectors on the basis of the microchannel plates and techniques for the detection of energetic neutral atoms (ENA imaging) in space. Later he participated in ENA experiments on the NASA IMAGE, TWINS and IBEX missions.

Gruntman's scholarly publications span across astronautics, space mission and spacecraft design, rocketry and spacecraft propulsion, space instrumentation and sensors, solar system galactic frontier, heliospheric and magnetospheric physics, space plasmas and environment, orbital debris, particle and photon analyzers and detector systems, space education, and space and rocket history.

=== Education and outreach ===
Gruntman has been advocating creation of pure space engineering academic units as an alternative to space degree programs in aerospace departments combining aeronautics and astronautics. He served as the founding chairman, 2004–2007, of such an independent academic unit at USC, currently the Department of Astronautical Engineering. He chairs the department again from 2016 to 2019.

Gruntman also produces educational short videos on satellite orbits and related topics which has attracted more than a million viewers on YouTube. He is a frequent guest speaker on The Space Show.

=== History ===
Gruntman has authored two books on history of rocketry and space technology, published by the American Institute of Aeronautics and Astronautics (AIAA). Blazing the Trail. The Early History of Spacecraft and Rocketry, published in 2004, received the 2006 Luigi G. Napolitano Award from the International Academy of Astronautics. Intercept 1961: The Birth of Soviet Missile Defense (2015) covers the history of the Soviet air defense and missile defense. He also published a book about pioneers of space Robert Esnault-Pelterie and Ary Sternfeld and the words astronautics and cosmonautics which they had respectively introduced in the language of science and engineering.

Gruntman is also the author of "Enemy Amongst Trojans: A Soviet Spy at USC" detailing a Soviet espionage operation in the United States when GRU officer Ignacy Witczak (Litvin) operated under a cover of a student and then instructor at the University of Southern California (USC) in the 1940s.

== List of books published ==
- Gruntman, Mike (2004). Blazing the trail : the early history of spacecraft and rocketry. Reston, Va.: American Institute of Aeronautics and Astronautics. ISBN 978-1-60086-872-6. OCLC 774285730.
- —— (2015). Intercept 1961 : the birth of Soviet missile defense. Reston, VA: American Institute of Aeronautics and Astronautics, Inc. ISBN 978-1-62410-350-6. OCLC 911134979.
- —— (2010). Enemy amongst Trojans : a Soviet spy at USC. Los Angeles: Figueroa Press. ISBN 978-1-932800-74-6. OCLC 690920515.
- —— (2007). From astronautics to cosmonautics. North Charleston, S.C.: Booksurge. ISBN 978-1-4196-7085-5. OCLC 156950339.
- —— (2022). My fifteen years at IKI, the Space Research Institute : position-sensitive detectors and energetic neutral atoms behind the Iron Curtain. Interstellar Trail Press. ISBN 979-8-9856687-0-4. OCLC 1310323554.
- —— (2022). Fundamentals of space missions : problems with solutions. Interstellar Trail Press. ISBN 979-8-9856687-4-2. OCLC 1341211101.
- —— (2025). Neil Armstrong at USC and on the Moon: Apollo 11 Lunar Landing. Interstellar Trail Press. ISBN 979-8985668780. OCLC 1536323218.

== Honors and awards ==
- 2000, 2001, 2011 NASA Group Achievement Award
- 2006 Luigi G. Napolitano Award from the International Academy of Astronautics
- 2001 – 2003, Editorial board member, Review of Scientific Instruments, American Institute of Physics (AIP)
- Member (Academician) of the International Academy of Astronautics
- Associate Fellow of the American Institute of Aeronautics and Astronautics (AIAA)
