= Jaega =

Native American chiefdom in Florida, US

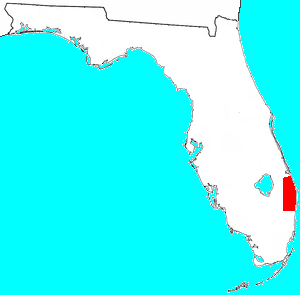
Approximate territory of the Jaega chiefdom in the late 17th Century

The Jaega (also Jega, Xega, Geiga) were Native Americans living in a chiefdom of the same name, which included the coastal parts of present-day Martin County and northern Palm Beach County, Florida, at the time of initial European contact, and until the 18th century. The name Jobé, or Jové [ˈxoβe], has been identified as a synonym of Jaega, a sub-group of the Jaega, or a town of the Jaega.

== East Okeechobee culture region ==
The area occupied by the Jaega corresponds to the East Okeechobee culture region, an archaeological culture that is part of, or closely related to, the Belle Glade culture or the Glades culture. The East Okeechobee region was approximately coterminous with the eastern half of present-day Palm Beach and Martin counties, extending along the coast from the St. Lucie Inlet to the Boca Raton Inlet, and inland to some point between the coast and Lake Okeechobee. Included in the Glades culture in early assessments, archaeological sites and settlement patterns in Palm Beach County differed from those of the Glades culture found in the tree islands of the Everglades. It was a transitional culture area, with ceramics, shell tools, and large mounds typical of the St. Johns culture to the north and the Belle Glade culture to west, compared to the Glades culture to the south. On the other hand, bone tools and ornaments of the East Okeechobee region most closely resembled those of the Glades culture. The influences of neighboring cultures appears to have changed over time. After AD 1000, the East Okeechobee culture area was primarily influenced by the St. Johns and Indian River cultures to the north, with little influence from the Belle Glade culture to the west, or the Glades culture of the Tequesta to the south.

== History ==
Partial map showing Jaega (Xega) presence in South Florida (c. 1600) (Note: The image shows part of a map which is endorsed Planta de la costa de la Florida y en que paraje La Guna de Maymiy adonde i se ha de hacer el fuerte. The original is in the Archives of the Indies in Sevilla, Spain, and a copy is held by the Library of Congress. Lowery identifies the names along the coast from North to South as S mateo, S augustin (St. Augustine), matancas (Matanzas Inlet), moysquitos (Mosquito Inlet), cabo de cañaberal (Cape Canaveral), ays (Ais people), S iozia (Santa Lucia), and Xega, with laguna meiymi (Lake Okeechobee) shown in the interior of the peninsula. The map is not dated, but Lowery argues that it may have been produced as early as 1595. Seckinger argues that the map was produced in conjunction with a 1604 expibition searching for a navigable connection between the St. Johns River and the Gulf of Mexico via Lake Okeechobee)

The East Okeechobee Area has received relatively little attention from archaeologists, and little is known of the origins of the Jaega, who were also called "Gega", "Jeaga", "Jega", or "Xega". The earliest mention of the Jaega came from Hernando de Escalante Fontaneda, who was held captive by indigenous peoples in Florida for 17 years until 1565 or 1566. He relates that the Jaega, along with the Ais and the obscure Guacata, salvaged precious metals and other goods from ships that wrecked along the Florida coast. Gabriel Díaz Vara Calderón, bishop of Santiago de Cuba in the 1670s, placed the Jaega between the Santa Lucies people and the Hobe people, i.e., between the St. Lucie Inlet and the Jupiter Inlet. Initially hostile to the Spanish, the Jaega entered into friendly relations with the Spanish by the 1620s.

Escalante Fontaneda also implied that the Jaega spoke the same language as the Ais, who lived along the Indian River Lagoon to the north of the Jaega. The Jaega may have been related to the Ais people, who occupied the coast to their north. (The Ais language has been linked to the Chitimacha language by linguist Julian Granberry.) The Jaega were linked to the Ais by marriage between chiefs and their relatives.

In 1565, the Spanish built the Presidio of Santa Lucia at what is probably the present-day St. Lucie River in the territory of the Ais people.The Spanish were soon driven out of Ais territory and the captain Don Juan Velez de Medrano built a new fort called Santa Lucia at the Jupiter Inlet, in Jaega territory. (Note: In a footnote in The Enterprise of Florida, Eugene Lyon states: "... I believe that the beginning point of the mutineers’ southward journey was not far south of the Sebastian River in Indian River County. Their course, estimated at twelve to fifteen leagues in length, would have brought them to the north side of the wide St. Lucie River; from there, it is about eighteen miles, or six leagues to Jupiter Inlet," where, he states, Velez de Medrano established Santa Lucia.) The Jaega were initially friendly towards the Spanish, but later attacked the presidio and forced the Spanish to withdraw less than a year later. Jonathan Dickinson placed the Ais town he called Santa Lucea two days' travel north of the Jupiter Inlet. The names Jaega and Jobé (or variants thereof) appear on 17th-century Spanish maps of Florida, and in Spanish reports.

Jonathan Dickinson, who was part of a shipwrecked party detained in the town of Jobé for several days in 1696, wrote a Journal that contains descriptions of the people of Jobé (near present-day Jupiter Inlet). He wrote that Jobé was subject to the Ais chief who resided in Jece (near present-day Vero Beach).

Manuel de Montiano, governor of Spanish Florida, in a 1738 letter to the King of Spain, mentioned Jaega in connection with a battle in central Florida involving the Amacapira, Bomto, Mayaca, and Pohoy peoples. The governor had sent a scout to investigate the battle, who reported meeting with Bomto, chief of the Bomto people, at the town of Jaega.

== Culture ==
There is little written history about the Jaega. They were likely similar in culture and custom to the surrounding Calusa, Tequesta and Ais tribes. The indigenous peoples of South Florida were all hunter-gatherers. Food was abundant enough to make agriculture unnecessary. Middens (Refuse mounds), consisting mostly of oyster and conch shells, also contain clues to the Jaega culture. Their diet consisted mainly of fish, shellfish, sea turtles, deer and raccoon, as well as wild plants including cocoplums, sea grapes, palmetto berries and tubers. Bits of broken pots and scraps of grass skirts demonstrate that crafts including pottery and weaving were known and practiced. One of the largest and best preserved Jaega middens is within what is now DuBois Park at the Jupiter Inlet Historic and Archeological Site, across from the Jupiter Inlet Lighthouse.

Although there are no deposits of flint in South Florida, flint dart points have been found at Jaega sites, indicating trade with northern tribes. The people used wood, bone and shell to craft tools and weapons.

Spanish reports describe elaborate ceremonies involving an elite class of priests, hundreds of singers and dancers, and complex ritual practice.

== Later names ==
The geographic name "Hobe Sound" is derived from the name of the Jaega village of Jobé. The Spanish pronounced the name "Ho-bay," which has evolved into the current anglicized "Hobe" (which is pronounced like "robe"). The name of the Jupiter Inlet may have been derived from the alternate Spanish spelling Jové, anglicized as "Jove".

== Sources ==
- Austin, Daniel W. (Summer–Fall 1997). "The Glades Indians and the Plants they Used. Ethnobotany of an Extinct Culture" (PDF). The Palmetto. 17 (2): 7–11.
- Brech, Alan (2004). Neither Ocean nor Continent: Correlating the Archeology and Geomorphology of the Barrier Islands of East Central Florida (PDF) (MA thesis). University of Florida. Archived from the original (PDF) on October 29, 2022.
- Carr, Robert S. (2012). "Mississippian Influence in the Glades, Belle Glade and East Okeechobee Area of South Florida". In Ashley, Keith; White, Nancy Marie (eds.). Late Prehistoric Florida: Archaeology at the Edge of the Mississippian World. Gainesville, Florida: University Press of Florida. pp. 62–80. ISBN 978-0-8130-4014-1.
- Dickinson, Jonathan (1700). God's protecting providence, man's surest help and defence, in times of the greatest difficulty, and most eminent danger. Evidenced in the remarkable deliverance of Robert Barrow, with divers other persons, from the devouring waves of the sea; amongst which they suffered shipwrack: and also, from the cruel, devouring jaws of the inhumane canibals of Florida (2nd ed.). London.
- Hann, John H. (1995). "Demise of the Pojoy and Bomto". The Florida Historical Quarterly. 74 (2): 184–200. ISSN 0015-4113. JSTOR 30148820.
- Hann, John H. (2003). Indians of Central and South Florida: 1513-1763. Gainesville, Florida: University Press of Florida. ISBN 0-8130-2645-8.
- Wheeler, Ryan J.; Kennedy, William Jerald; Pepe, James P. (September–December 2002). "The Archaeology of Coastal Palm Beach County". The Florida Anthropologist. 55 (3–4): 119–156 – via University of Florida Digital Collections.
- Wheeler, Ryan J.; Pepe, James P. (September–December 2002). "The Jobé and Jaega of the Palm Beach County Area". The Florida Anthropologist. 55 (3–4): 221–241 – via University of Florida Digital Collections.
