= Álvaro Mexía =

Spanish cartographer and explorer

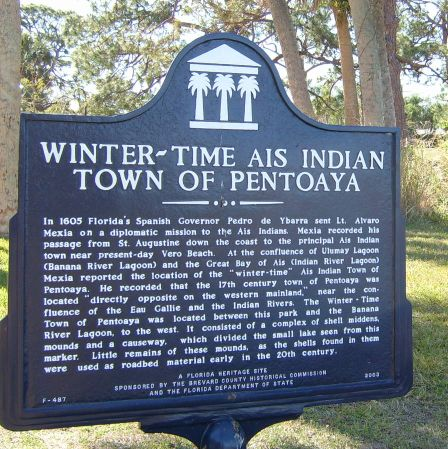
Mexia visits Ais Town of Pentoaya

Alvaro Mexia was a 17th-century Spanish explorer and cartographer of the east coast of Florida. Mexia was stationed in St Augustine and was given a diplomatic mission to the native populations living south of St. Augustine and in the Cape Canaveral area. This mission resulted in a "Period of Friendship" between the Spanish and the Ais native population.

When Pedro de Ibarra became the Spanish Governor of Florida, he knew the Spanish needed to improve relations with the natives, so he sent Mexia on a diplomatic mission in 1605 to gain knowledge of the lands and populations south of St. Augustine, as well as to assist that year's treasure fleet on its way back to Spain.

Mexia wrote about his experiences among the native Ais in a document known as a Derrotero, a self-proclaimed "truthful account" and description of his journey in the land of the Ais. Mexia also created a map in color. His journey completed in 1605, his Derrotero and map were sent to the King of Spain in a letter from Pedro de Ibarra.

His letters and map show native towns and place names south of St. Augustine. These include:

- Surruque In New Smyrna Beach. Mexia and his party arrived at Surruque on June 6, 1605, and remained in the area for eight days while he waited for orders to proceed to the Ais Indian Nation.
- Nocoroco town – mouth of Tomoka River, in Volusia County
- After leaving Nocoroco Mexia writes about passing by a buhio, a West Indian (Arawak) word for a native hut. It came to be applied to anything from the family dwelling to the large communal lodge which according to Bishop Calderon, would accommodate 2000 to 3000 people.
- Caparca site – New Smyrna (Volusia County)
- Potopotoya – Haulover Canal, place where Native Americans crossed land with their canoes
- Savo
- Lagoon of Sababoche – southern extent of the present-day Banana River
- Town of Savochequeya – present-day Newfound Harbor on Merritt Island, Florida
- Lagoon of Ulumay – the Banana River Lagoon north of the Lagoon of Sababoche
- Through "Callejon" to Pentoaya (Indian Harbor Beach on the barrier island and Eau Gallie on the mainland), a Distance of .5 leagues (1.5 mi)
- Traverse of the Grand Bay of Ais 5 leagues (15 mi)
- Two small islands in the Indian River Lagoon (one of which was Grant Farm Island)
- Then to a small fresh water river, now called the Sebastian River 1 league (3.0 mi)
- Then to the great Indian town of the Ais 1.5 leagues away (or about 4.5 to 5 miles), now called the Kroegel Homestead, but also called Barker's Bluff (8IR84) prior to the mound being sold for road-fill in the early 1900s

Alvaro returned to St. Augustine and made his report to Ibarra on July 11, 1605, more than a month after his departure. The mission was considered a success as on September 2, 1605, the elusive Capitan Grande (an Ais Chief) finally arrived in St. Augustine accompanied by his mandador (a sort of deputy chief), the chiefs of Surruque and Urbia, and twenty Indians. Agreements were made that the Ais Indians would return shipwrecked sailors to the Spanish for a ransom.
