= Mosquito Lagoon =

Lagoon in the state of Florida, United States

Coordinates: 28°45′03″N 80°45′01″W

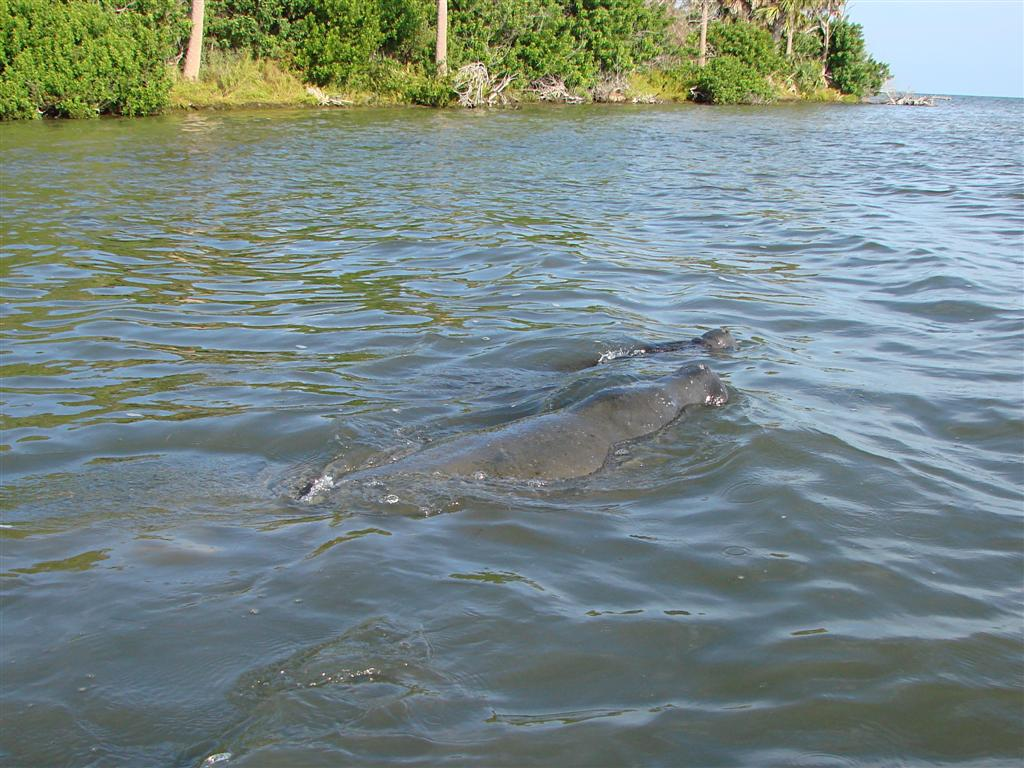
Two manatees swimming in Mosquito Lagoon, Florida, near the Haulover Canal. September 9, 2006

Mosquito Lagoon is a body of water located on the east coast of Florida in Brevard and Volusia counties. It is part of the Indian River Lagoon system and the Atlantic Intracoastal Waterway. It extends from the Ponce de Leon Inlet to a point north of Cape Canaveral, and connects to the Indian River via the Haulover Canal. The Mosquito Lagoon Aquatic Preserve includes 4,740 acres (1,920 ha) in the northern end of the lagoon. The preserve originally extended to the southern end of the lagoon, but close to two-thirds of the preserve in the central and southern lagoon were transferred to the Federal government, and is now part of the Canaveral National Seashore. The cities of New Smyrna Beach and Edgewater, the Merritt Island National Wildlife Refuge and the Kennedy Space Center adjoin the lagoon.

The Nature Conservancy is coordinating an oyster restoration project, developed by the University of Central Florida. The goal is to restore about 40 acres (160,000 m^{2}) of oyster reef habitat within the Canaveral National Seashore.

Winter, the bottlenose dolphin notable for her prosthetic tail (whose story was featured in the film Dolphin Tale and the sequel Dolphin Tale 2) was rescued from Mosquito Lagoon in December 2005.

In recent years the Mosquito lagoon has experienced several algal blooms, called "brown tides", that have resulted in extensive fish kills. The species of alga thought to be primarily responsible for the blooms, Aureoumbra lagunensis, was first detected in the lagoon in 2005. Blooms causing fish kills have occurred in the lagoon in 2012, 2016, 2018 and 2020.
