= Mayaca people =

Native American tribe in central Florida (16th-18th c.)

Mayaca
Total population
- Extinct as tribe

Regions with significant populations
- South of Lake George

Languages
- Mayaca

Related ethnic groups
- Jororo

Mayaca was the name used by the Spanish to refer to a Native American tribe in central Florida, to the principal village of that tribe and to the chief of that village in the 1560s. The Mayacas occupied an area in the upper St. Johns River valley just to the south of Lake George. According to Hernando de Escalante Fontaneda, the Mayaca language was related to that of the Ais, a tribe living along the Atlantic coast of Florida to the southeast of the Mayacas. The Mayacas were hunter-fisher-gatherers, and were not known to practice agriculture to any significant extent, unlike their neighbors to the north, the Utina, or Agua Dulce (Freshwater) Timucua. (In general, agriculture had not been adopted by tribes living south of the Timucua at the time of first contact with European people.) The Mayaca shared a ceramics tradition (the St. Johns culture) with the Freshwater Timucua, rather than the Ais (the Indian River culture).

== History ==
The Spanish first encountered the Mayaca in 1566 while attempting to ransom some Frenchmen held by the Indians. Several villages near the Atlantic coast were reported to owe allegiance to Mayaca. At that time Mayaca appears to have been allied with the Mocama, or Agua Salada Timucua chief Saturiwa against the Agua Dulce (Freshwater) Timucua. In 1567 the Mayaca joined with the Saturiwa and the Potano, another Timucua people, against the Agua Dulce, which was defeated with Spanish aid.

Spanish Franciscan friars first visited the Mayaca late in the 16th century. The chief of the Mayaca had been converted to Christianity by 1597, but a mission, San Salvador de Mayaca, was not established until later. That mission is not mentioned in Spanish records for most of the 17th century. Missionary activity resumed again by 1680, at Anacape (San Antonio de Anacape) and Mayaca. By this time, Chachises (or Salchiches), Malaos (or Malicas) had become part of the population in Mayaca province, while refugee Yamassees had become the majority of the population. By the 1690s missions had been established at Concepción de Atoyquime, San Joseph de Jororo and in Atisimmi, in what had become the Mayaca-Jororo Province, and some Spanish ranches operated in the area. Disturbances in 1696 and 1697 led to the murders of a friar and some Indian converts. Peace was restored, but in 1708 raids by Indians allied with English colonists in the Province of Carolina drove part of the Mayaca to seek refuge around St. Augustine. Others of the Mayacas moved south to the eastern side of Lake Okeechobee, which was named "Lake Mayaca" on maps in the 1820s (Port Mayaca, on the eastern shore of Lake Okeechobee, is a remnant of that name). In 1738 and 1739 a series of battles between the Mayaca living at Lake Okeechobee and their allies the Jororo and Bomto (or Bonita) on one side and the Calusa, Pojoy and Amacapiras on the other side, together with a raid by the Uchise on the Pojoy, resulted in some 300 deaths. Some Mayaca were still living near Lake Okeechobee in 1743.

== Related tribes ==
=== Jororo ===
The Jororo or Hororo lived just to the south of the Mayaca, probably in what is now Polk and Osceola counties in south-central Florida. They first appear in the Spanish records in the 1680s, and spoke the Mayaca language. Like the Mayaca, the Jororo were hunter-fisher-gatherers. Their land was very wet, full of lakes and "brambles", and subject to frequent flooding. Hann suggests that the name of the mission at Jizime or Atissime or Atisme indicates that Jororo territory extended in the valley of the Kissimmee River.

=== Others ===
Mayajuaca, Macoya and Mayrra are mentioned by early Spanish and French sources, and were probably located in the St. Johns River valley and associated with Mayaca. Macoya may in fact be a variant form of Mayaca.
