= Juno Beach, Florida =

Town in the state of Florida, United States

- Town
- Town of Juno Beach
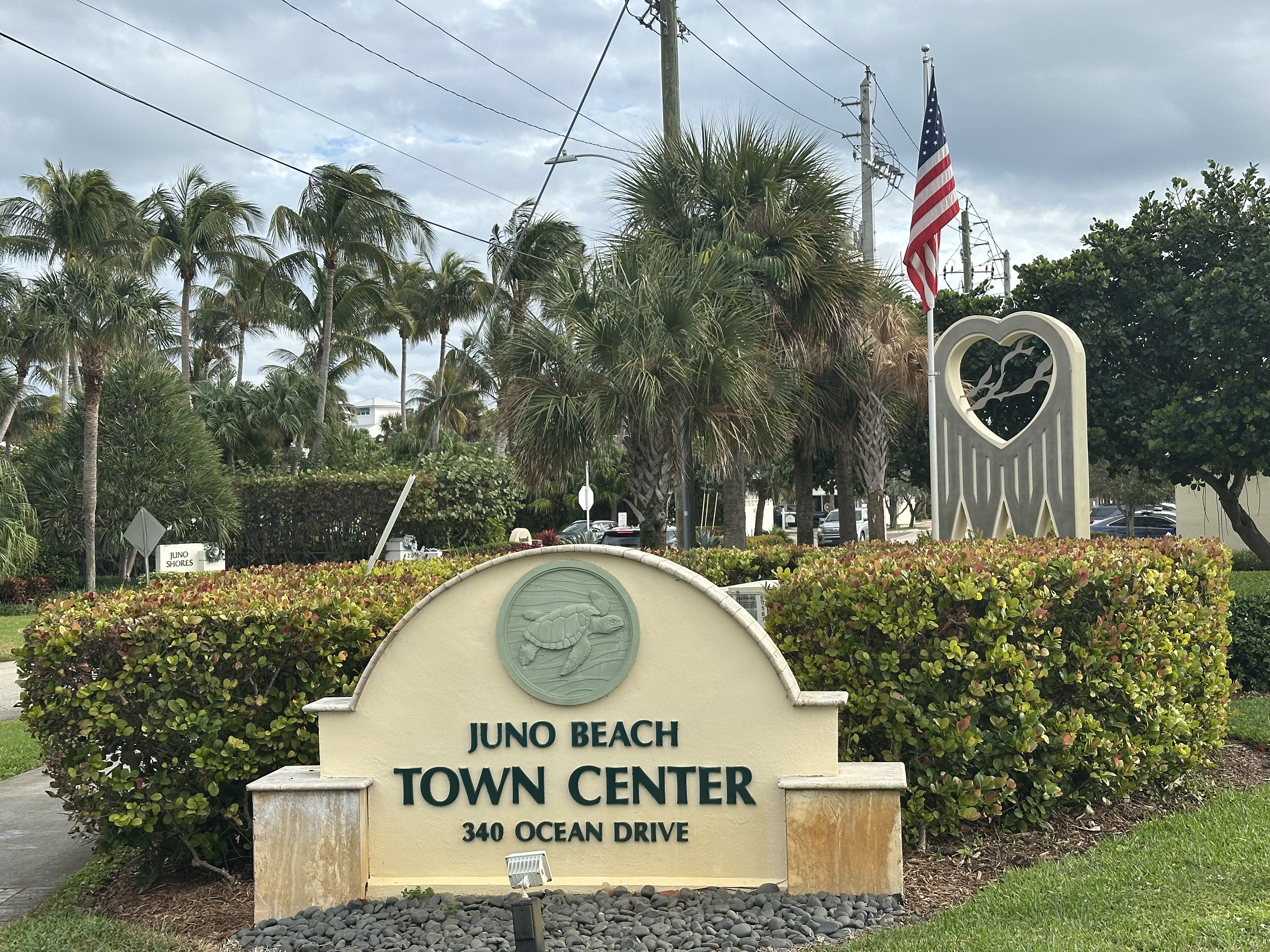
- Juno Beach Town Center

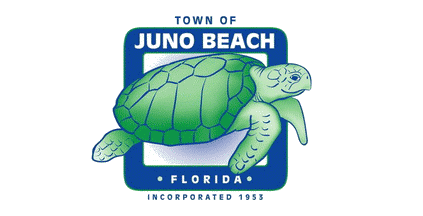
- Flag

- Location of Juno Beach in Palm Beach County, Florida
- Coordinates: 26°52′14″N 80°03′20″W
- Country: United States
- State: Florida
- County: Palm Beach
- Settled: 1890
- Platted: 1948
- Incorporated: 1953

Government
  - Type: Council-Manager
  - Mayor: Dave Santilli
  - Vice Mayor: Diana Davis
  - Council Members: Max Fraser, Scott Shaw, and Vice Mayor Pro Tem; D.D. Halpern
  - Town Manager: Kathleen Gunn
  - Town Clerk: Caitlin E. Copeland-Rodriguez

Area
  - Total: 2.72 sq mi (7.05 km^{2})
  - Land: 2.04 sq mi (5.28 km^{2})
  - Water: 0.68 sq mi (1.77 km^{2})
- Elevation: 3 ft (0.91 m)

Population (2020)
  - Total: 3,858
  - Density: 1,891.7/sq mi (730.39/km^{2})
- Time zone: UTC-5 (Eastern (EST))
  - Summer (DST): UTC-4 (EDT)
- ZIP code: 33408
- Area codes: 561, 728
- FIPS code: 12-35850
- GNIS feature ID: 2405926
- Website: www.juno-beach.fl.us

Juno Beach is a town in Palm Beach County, Florida, United States. Juno Beach is home to the headquarters of Florida Power & Light, the Loggerhead Marinelife Center and the Seminole Golf Club. It is home to one of the most dense sea turtle nesting areas in the world. It was also the original county seat for the area that was then part of Dade County. Juno Beach is in the Miami metropolitan area. The political climate in Juno Beach is leaning liberal. The property crime rate is around the US national average, with the violent crime rate well below average. The town was officially incorporated in 1953. As of the 2020 census, Juno Beach had a population of 3,858.

== History ==
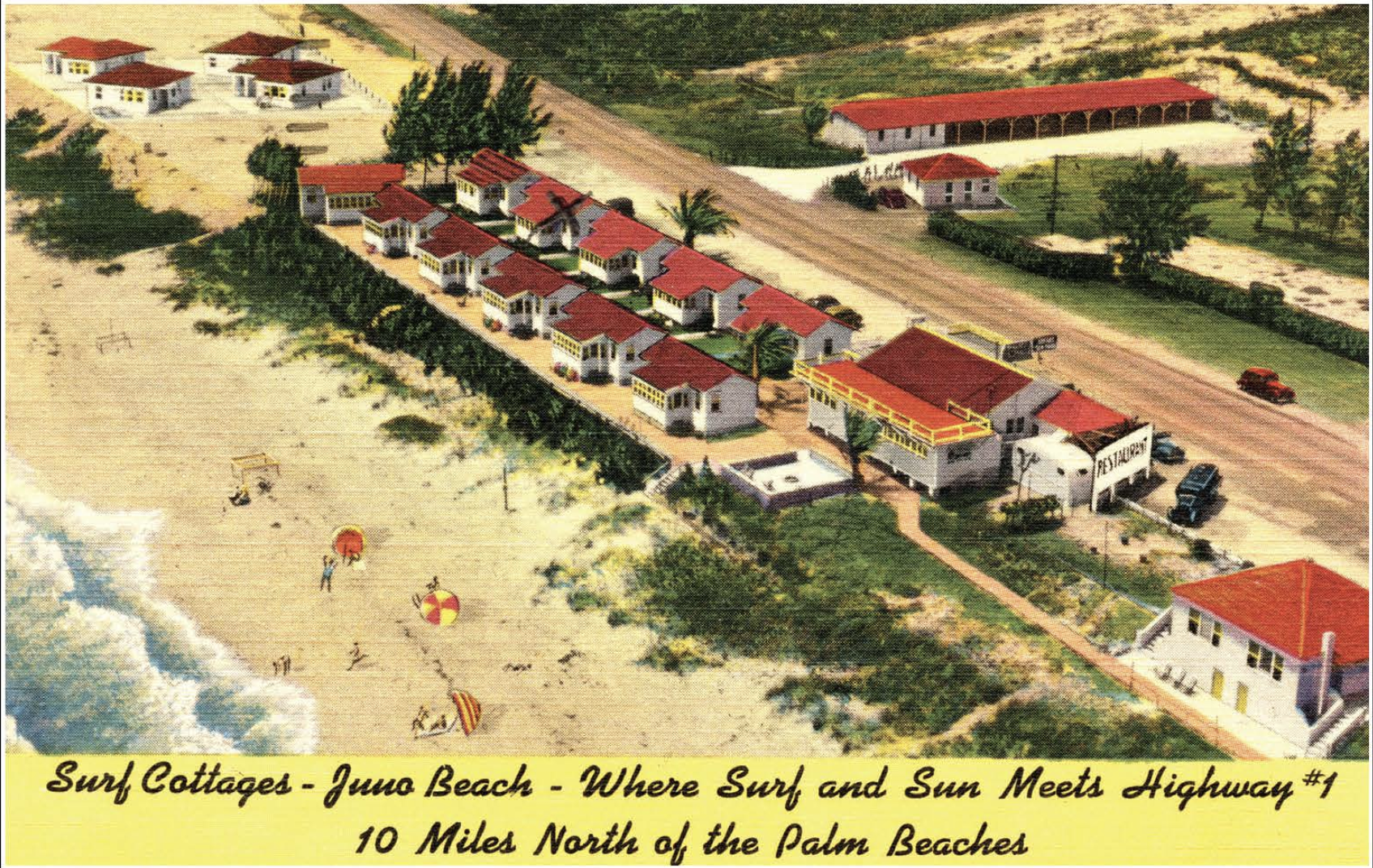
Surf Cottages (Motel) Juno Beach Florida

As a sister settlement to the town of Jupiter to the north, the development was named in 1890, after Jupiter's wife, the ancient Roman goddess Juno. The designation in 1944 of a namesake D-Day landing beach in Normandy, named for Juno Dawnay, a Canadian officer's wife, was purely coincidental.

The community was platted in 1948, and its pier was built in 1950. The Town of Juno Beach was officially incorporated as a municipality in 1953. The original pier was destroyed during a November storm in 1984, and a new 993-foot Juno Beach Pier built in 1999.

The area has evidence of human settlement dating back to around 500 B.C., with early indigenous civilizations, and saw European contact beginning in the 1500s through Spanish exploration. In the late 19th century, the nearby town of Juno served as Dade County's county seat and a transportation hub for the Jupiter and Lake Worth Railway, often referred to as the "Celestial Railroad." This prominence faded after Henry Flagler's development of Palm Beach in 1893, which shifted regional economic activity further south.

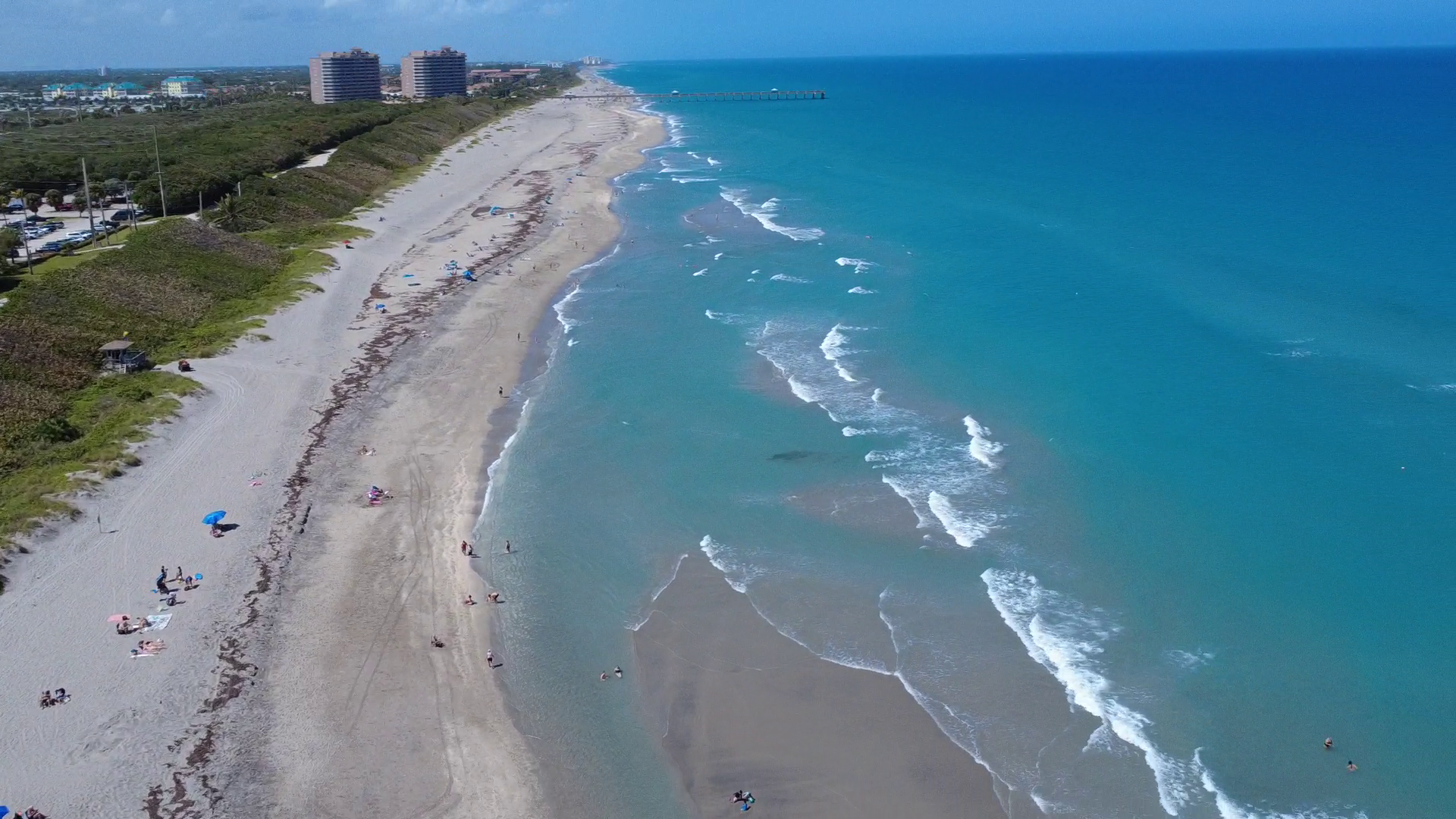
Juno Beach Pier and beach seen from an aerial drone

Modern development of Juno Beach began in 1948, when Bessemer Properties platted a subdivision near the Seminole Golf Club and initiated early infrastructure improvements. Following incorporation in 1953, the town expanded steadily, with street naming by the Juno Beach Garden Club in 1958, and condominium growth in the 1960s. The 1980s saw increased commercial and residential development, including the addition of The Waterford life care community and Florida Power & Light's administrative offices, contributing to a diversified tax base. In 1983, the Loggerhead Marinelife Center was founded in Loggerhead Park, as the town has one of the densest sea turtle nesting areas in the world. By 1991, the completion of Town Center marked a new chapter in civic identity, supporting a growing population and fostering a seaside residential character. In 2023, the Loggerhead Marinelife Center recorded a record-breaking 25,025 sea turtle nests on their 9.5-mile stretch of beach. This included 15,672 loggerhead nests, 9,137 green turtle nests, and 216 leatherback nests, producing more than one million hatchlings.

== During the Second World War ==
During World War II, German U-boats patrolled this coastline. Tankers were a favorite target as they transported oil via the swift, northbound Gulf Stream which runs close to the South Florida coast.

A submarine attacked a tanker south of Juno Beach, off Singer Island.

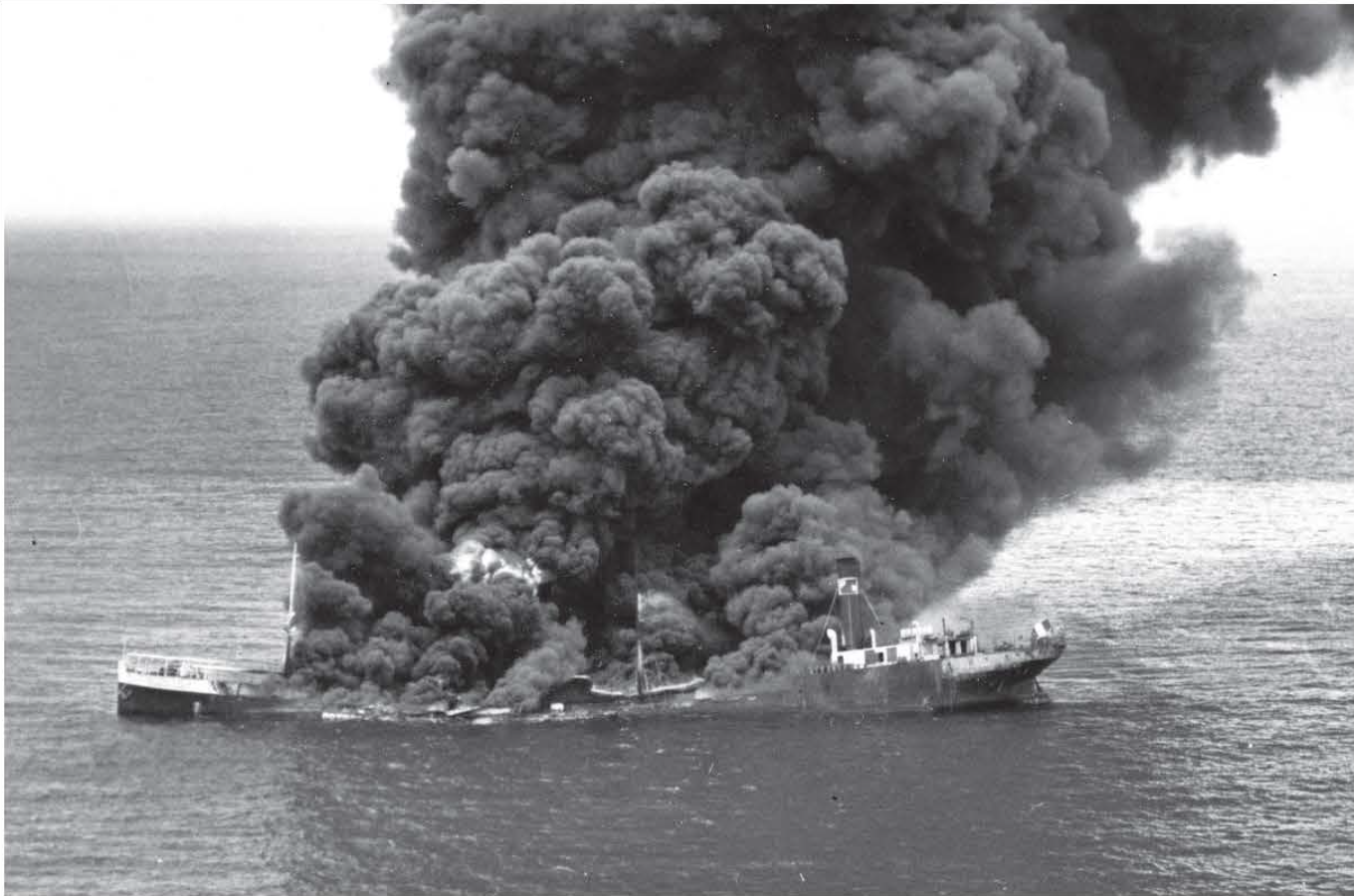
A Panamanian tanker that sunk after being torpedoed by U-564.

With these submarines offshore, people feared that our sparsely inhabited coastline would be ideal for landing parties of German spies or saboteurs. To watch for them: "A beach patrol was formed, and men on horseback rode along the beach to warn of enemy activity. . . Wounded American sailors, whose ships had been sunk by the submarines, occasionally were found on the beach and rushed to the hospital . . . by the townspeople." - Nora Fitzgerald, a local resident.

The U.S. Coast Guard leased the Surf Cottages motel during the war. Horseback beach patrols, which included civilian volunteers, used the motel car sheds across the street as stables.

== Geography ==
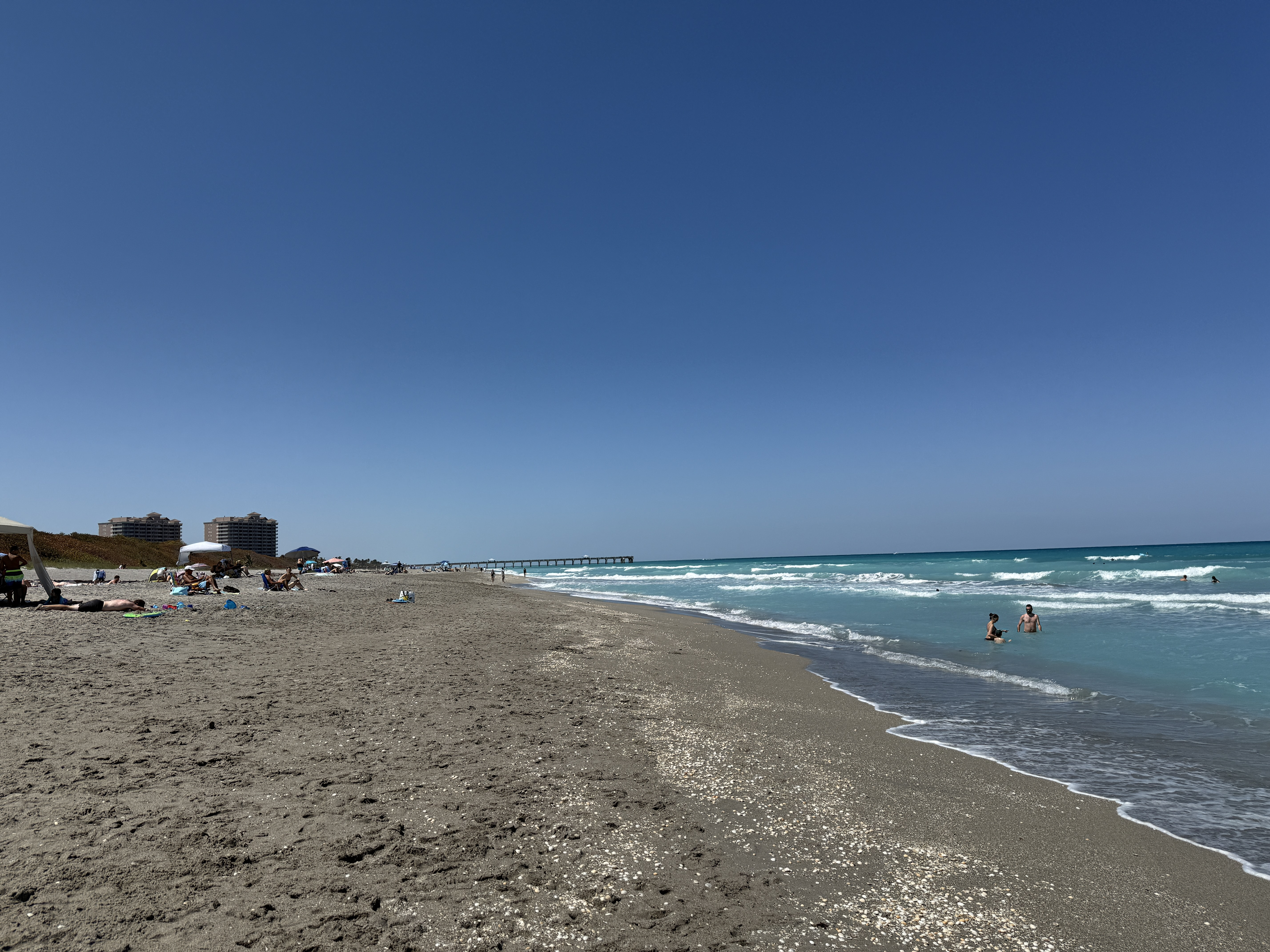
Juno Beach at Loggerhead Park

According to the United States Census Bureau, the town has a total area of 1.9 square miles (4.9 km^{2}), of which 0.5 square miles (1.3 km^{2}) (25.13%) is covered by water.

== Geology ==
Juno Beach sits on a narrow barrier island along the Atlantic Coastal Ridge. Its present separation from the mainland resulted from the dredging of the Intracoastal Waterway in the late 19th century. Construction of the waterway involved connecting existing waterways and cutting through marshes.

The Atlantic Coastal Ridge in Palm Beach County is underlain by the Anastasia Formation, a geological formation which consists of interbedded sands and shell-rich limestones containing fossil mollusk shells.

Juno Dunes Natural Area as seen aerially from the East

The beaches and coastal dunes in the region consist of a loose quartz sand mixed with carbonate/shell fragments. The coastline in this region experiences an active net southward sediment transport.

Inland from the beach, ancient coastal sand dunes form ridges which support native scrub vegetation. These sand ridges include remnants of coastal dunes dating to the Pleistocene epoch. They are remnants of an older coastal landscape, where wind accumulated beach sand into dunes along former shorelines. This landscape has been preserved in the Juno Dunes Natural area.

== Climate ==
Juno Beach has a tropical rainforest climate with hot summers and warm winters, and no dry season.

Climate data for Juno Beach, Florida, 1991–2020 normals, extremes 2002–present
| Month | Jan | Feb | Mar | Apr | May | Jun | Jul | Aug | Sep | Oct | Nov | Dec | Year |
|---|---|---|---|---|---|---|---|---|---|---|---|---|---|
| Record high °F (°C) | 86 (30) | 89 (32) | 92 (33) | 97 (36) | 94 (34) | 98 (37) | 99 (37) | 97 (36) | 96 (36) | 94 (34) | 91 (33) | 90 (32) | 99 (37) |
| Mean maximum °F (°C) | 83.7 (28.7) | 85.4 (29.7) | 88.2 (31.2) | 89.6 (32.0) | 90.5 (32.5) | 93.8 (34.3) | 94.2 (34.6) | 94.1 (34.5) | 93.1 (33.9) | 90.5 (32.5) | 87.1 (30.6) | 85.0 (29.4) | 95.5 (35.3) |
| Mean daily maximum °F (°C) | 74.6 (23.7) | 76.3 (24.6) | 78.6 (25.9) | 82.7 (28.2) | 85.3 (29.6) | 89.0 (31.7) | 90.9 (32.7) | 90.9 (32.7) | 89.2 (31.8) | 85.7 (29.8) | 80.7 (27.1) | 76.9 (24.9) | 83.4 (28.6) |
| Daily mean °F (°C) | 66.1 (18.9) | 67.8 (19.9) | 70.5 (21.4) | 75.0 (23.9) | 78.5 (25.8) | 82.1 (27.8) | 83.7 (28.7) | 83.8 (28.8) | 82.5 (28.1) | 79.2 (26.2) | 73.7 (23.2) | 69.3 (20.7) | 76.0 (24.4) |
| Mean daily minimum °F (°C) | 57.7 (14.3) | 59.3 (15.2) | 62.4 (16.9) | 67.3 (19.6) | 71.8 (22.1) | 75.2 (24.0) | 76.5 (24.7) | 76.7 (24.8) | 75.8 (24.3) | 72.7 (22.6) | 66.6 (19.2) | 61.7 (16.5) | 68.6 (20.3) |
| Mean minimum °F (°C) | 39.9 (4.4) | 43.8 (6.6) | 48.1 (8.9) | 56.1 (13.4) | 64.2 (17.9) | 71.1 (21.7) | 71.9 (22.2) | 72.9 (22.7) | 71.9 (22.2) | 60.7 (15.9) | 51.3 (10.7) | 46.7 (8.2) | 37.5 (3.1) |
| Record low °F (°C) | 30 (−1) | 32 (0) | 39 (4) | 48 (9) | 55 (13) | 69 (21) | 65 (18) | 70 (21) | 66 (19) | 49 (9) | 42 (6) | 31 (−1) | 30 (−1) |
| Average precipitation inches (mm) | 3.85 (98) | 3.85 (98) | 4.94 (125) | 4.15 (105) | 6.13 (156) | 10.06 (256) | 6.39 (162) | 8.69 (221) | 8.10 (206) | 6.68 (170) | 4.75 (121) | 4.60 (117) | 72.19 (1,834) |
| Average precipitation days (≥ 0.01 in) | 7.3 | 6.7 | 6.9 | 7.4 | 9.9 | 13.6 | 13.1 | 15.0 | 14.7 | 9.9 | 8.9 | 9.2 | 122.6 |
Source: NOAA (mean maxima/minima 2006–2020)

== Demographics ==
Historical population
| Census | Pop. | Note | %± |
|---|---|---|---|
| 1960 | 249 | | — |
| 1970 | 747 | | 200.0% |
| 1980 | 1,142 | | 52.9% |
| 1990 | 2,121 | | 85.7% |
| 2000 | 3,262 | | 53.8% |
| 2010 | 3,176 | | −2.6% |
| 2020 | 3,858 | | 21.5% |
U.S. Decennial Census

=== 2020 census ===
Juno Beach racial composition (Hispanics excluded from racial categories) (NH = Non-Hispanic)
| Race | Number | Percentage |
|---|---|---|
| White (NH) | 3,492 | 90.51% |
| Black or African American (NH) | 21 | 0.54% |
| Native American or Alaska Native (NH) | 3 | 0.08% |
| Asian (NH) | 69 | 1.79% |
| Pacific Islander or Native Hawaiian (NH) | 0 | 0.00% |
| Some other race (NH) | 4 | 0.10% |
| Two or more races/Multiracial (NH) | 87 | 2.26% |
| Hispanic or Latino (any race) | 182 | 4.72% |
| Total | 3,858 | 100.00% |

As of the 2020 census, Juno Beach had a population of 3,858. The median age was 66.5 years. 5.2% of residents were under the age of 18 and 54.0% of residents were 65 years of age or older. For every 100 females there were 79.5 males, and for every 100 females age 18 and over there were 79.8 males age 18 and over.

As of 2020, 100.0% of residents lived in urban areas, while 0.0% lived in rural areas.

In 2020, there were 2,016 households in Juno Beach, of which 7.4% had children under the age of 18 living in them. Of all households, 45.0% were married-couple households, 18.7% were households with a male householder and no spouse or partner present, and 31.2% were households with a female householder and no spouse or partner present. About 40.1% of all households were made up of individuals and 25.4% had someone living alone who was 65 years of age or older.

In 2020, there were 3,222 housing units, of which 37.4% were vacant. The homeowner vacancy rate was 2.7% and the rental vacancy rate was 20.9%.

In the U.S. Census Bureau's 2020 American Community Survey 5-year estimates, there were 943 families residing in the town.

=== 2010 census ===
Juno Beach Demographics
| 2010 Census | Juno Beach | Palm Beach County | Florida |
| Total population | 3,176 | 1,320,134 | 18,801,310 |
| Population, percent change, 2000 to 2010 | −2.6% | +16.7% | +17.6% |
| Population density | 1,564.5/sq mi | 670.2/sq mi | 350.6/sq mi |
| White or Caucasian (including White Hispanic) | 96.4% | 73.5% | 75.0% |
| (Non-Hispanic White or Caucasian) | 93.1% | 60.1% | 57.9% |
| Black or African-American | 0.6% | 17.3% | 16.0% |
| Hispanic or Latino (of any race) | 3.8% | 19.0% | 22.5% |
| Asian | 1.6% | 2.4% | 2.4% |
| Native American or Native Alaskan | 0.1% | 0.5% | 0.4% |
| Pacific Islander or Native Hawaiian | 0.0% | 0.1% | 0.1% |
| Two or more races (Multiracial) | 0.7% | 2.3% | 2.5% |
| Some Other Race | 0.1% | 3.9% | 3.6% |

As of the 2010 United States census, there were 3,176 people, 1,989 households, and 909 families were residing in the town.

=== 2000 census ===
At the 2000 census, there were 3,176 people, 1,791 households, and 929 families resided in the town. The population density was 2,339.2 inhabitants per square mile (903.2/km^{2}). The 2,603 housing units hd an average density of 1,866.6/sq mi (720.7/km^{2}). The racial makeup of the town was 97.82% White (of which 95% were Non-Hispanic white), 0.43% African American, 0.12% Native American, 0.61% Asian, 0.06% Pacific Islander, 0.34% from other races, and 0.61% from two or more races. Hispanics or Latinos of any race were 3.37%.

As of 2000, there were 1,791 households, 9.1% had children under 18 living with them, 47.8% were married couples living together, 3.0% had a female householder with no husband present, and 48.1% were not families. About 42.9% of households were one person and 25.5% were one person 65 or older. The average household size was 1.80, and the average family size was 2.42.

In 2000, the age distribution was 10.1% under 18, 2.3% from 18 to 24, 16.2% from 25 to 44, 28.8% from 45 to 64, and 42.6% 65 or older. The median age was 60 years. For every 100 females, there were 84.9 males. For every 100 females 18 and over, there were 79.7 males.

In 2000, the median household income was $55,263 and the median family income was $68,382. Males had a median income of $50,545 versus $36,842 for females. The per capita income for the town was $50,344. About 3.9% of families and 4.5% of the population were below the poverty line, including 5.7% of those under 18 and 2.7% of those 65 or over.

As of 2000, speakers of English as a first language accounted for 96.34% of all residents, while French made up 2.01%, Greek was at 1.00%, and Spanish accounted for 0.63% of the population.

== Places of interest ==
- Juno Dunes Natural Area
- Loggerhead Park and Loggerhead Marinelife Center
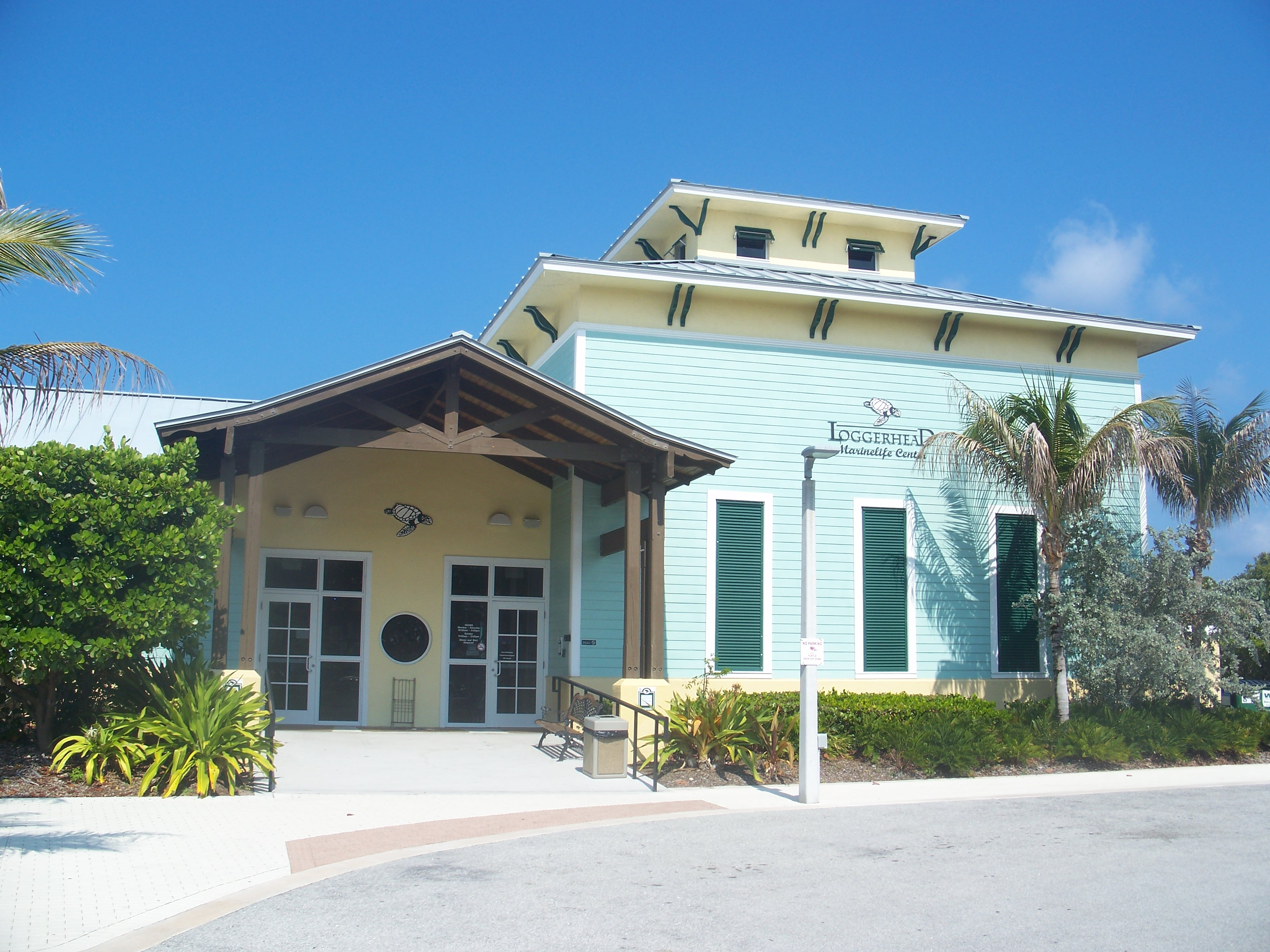
The Loggerhead Marinelife Center in Loggerhead Park.

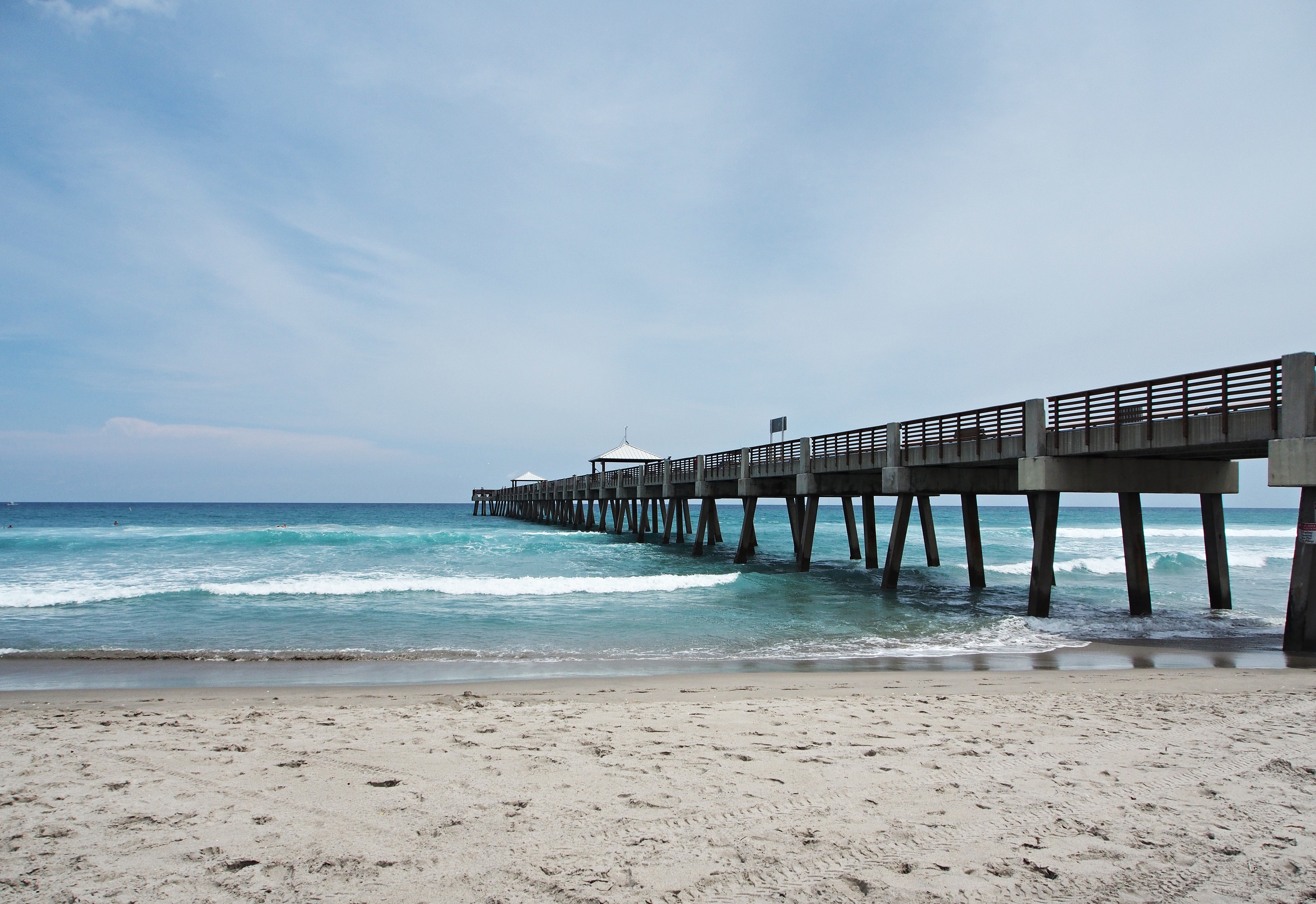
Juno Beach fishing pier, next to Loggerhead Park

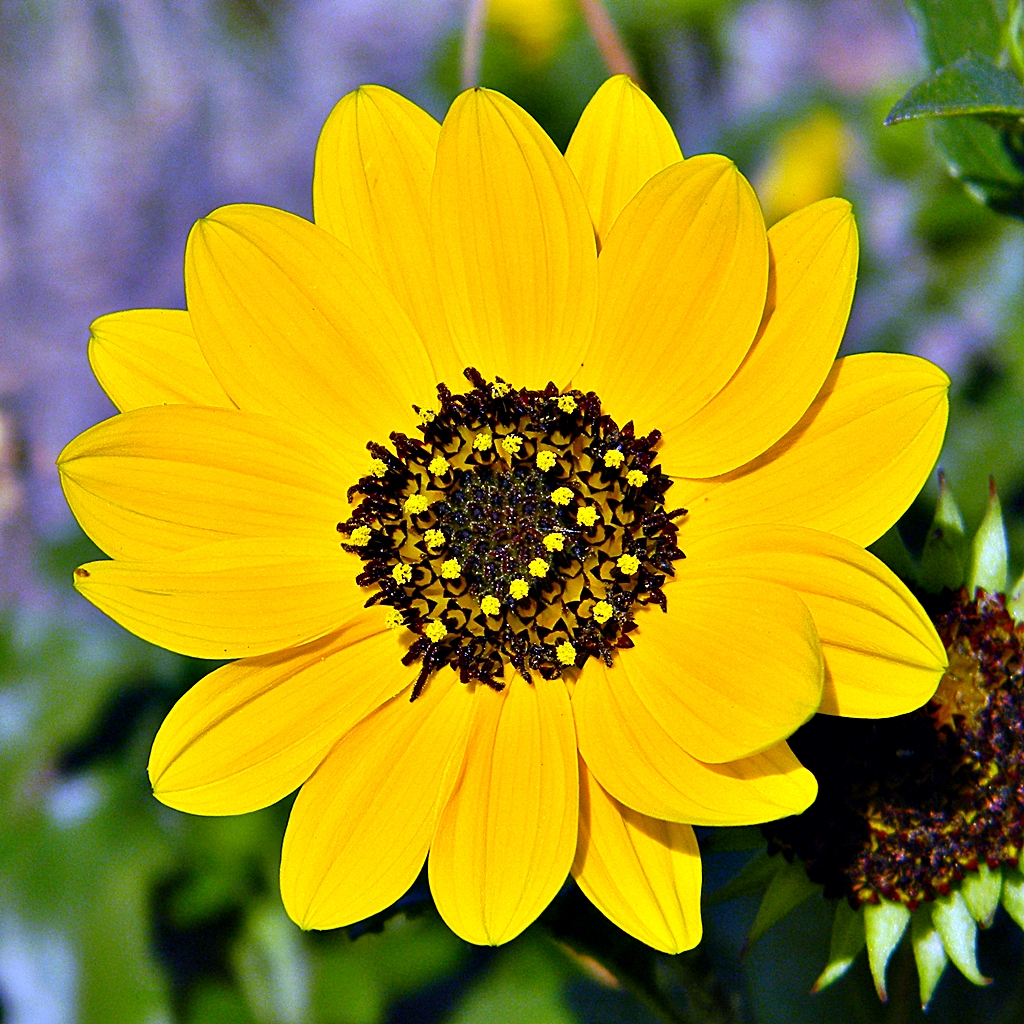
Flower from the Juno Dunes Natural Area
