= Anastasia Formation =

Geologic formation in Florida from the Late Pleistocene

- Stratigraphic range: Late Pleistocene
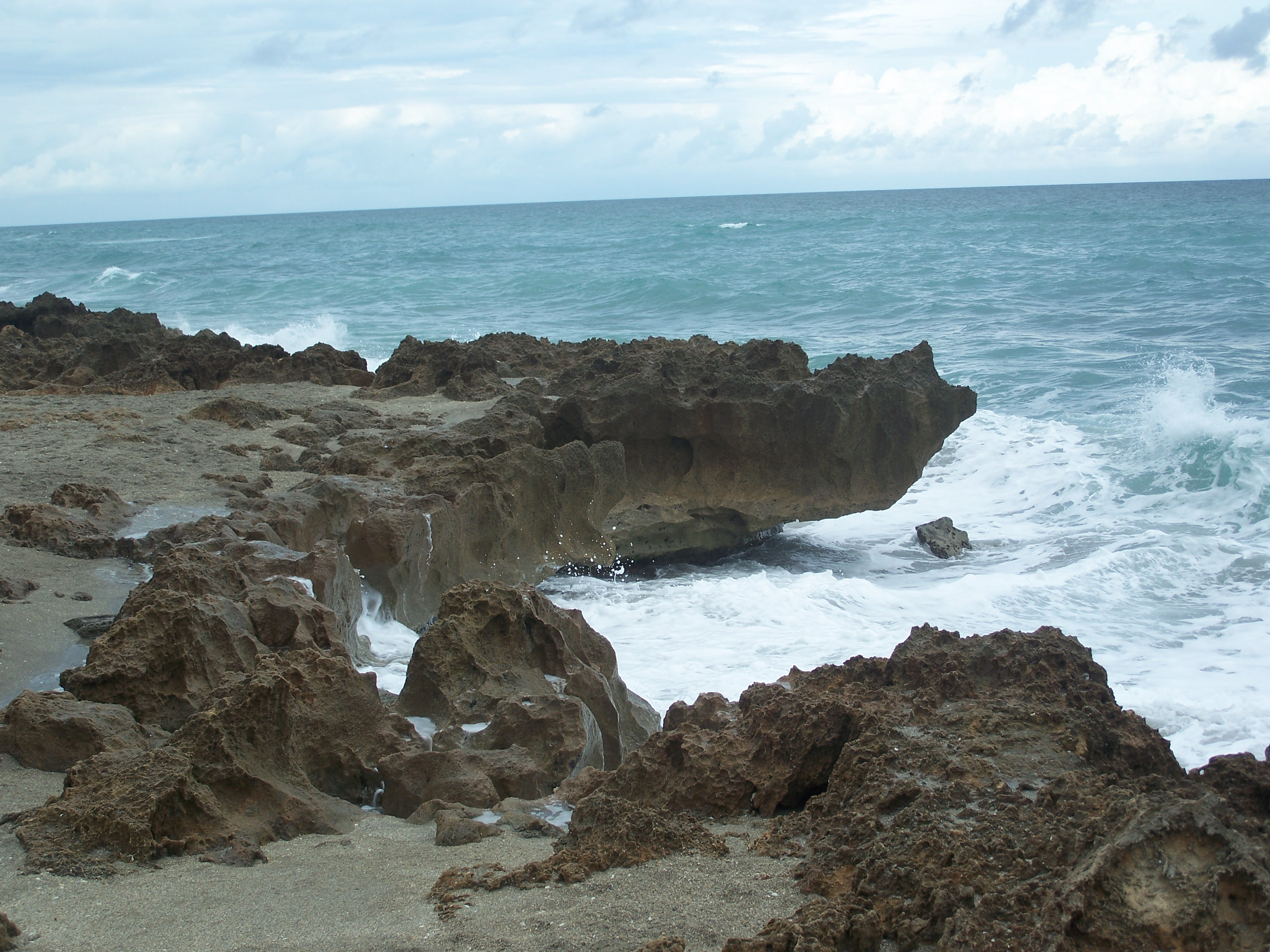
- Part of the formation on Hutchinson Island
- Type: Geological formation
- Underlies: Holocene deposits
- Overlies: Fort Thompson Formation

Lithology
- Primary: Coquina, sand, sandy limestone
- Other: Sandy marl

Location
- Region: East Florida
- Country: United States
- Extent: St. Johns—Palm Beach County

Type section
- Named for: Anastasia Island
- Named by: E. H. Sellards
- Year defined: 1912
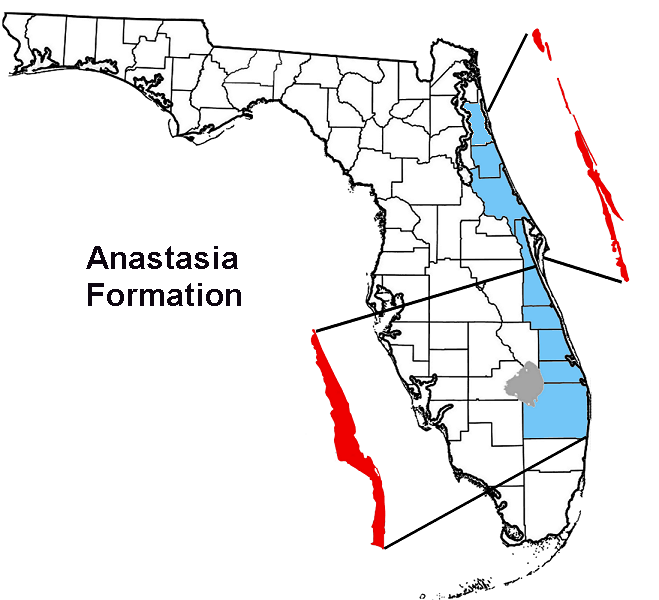
- Location of the Anastasia Formation (red) along the east coast of Florida

The Anastasia Formation is a geologic formation deposited in Florida during the Late Pleistocene epoch.

== Age ==
Period : Quaternary
Epoch: Pleistocene ~2.558 to 0.012 mya, calculates to a period of 2.576 million years
Faunal stage: Blancan through early Rancholabrean

== Location ==
Anastasia Formation underlies the Atlantic Coastal Ridge along the coast from St. John's County southward to Palm Beach County and extends inland as far as 20 miles (32 kilometers) in St. Lucie and Martin County. Blowing Rocks Preserve in southern Martin County is an exposed outcropping along the beach. The formation underlies the surface in eastern Palm Beach County, extending up to 17 kilometres (11 mi) inland from the coast. A second outcropping is seen at Washington Oaks Gardens State Park in northern Flagler County, south of St. Augustine.

== History ==
The Anastasia Formation was named by E. H. Sellards in 1912.

Coquina obtained from this formation on Anastasia Island was used to construct Castillo de San Marcos during the late 17th century; a local material, it was relatively easy to quarry and proved to be effective for absorbing cannon damage. This formation is an integral part of the surficial aquifer system.

Formed through multicyclic deposition the formation contains at least two disconformities, and two detectable ages. The formation registers in the late Pleistocene with oldest samples aging at 110,000 YBP based on radiometric dating (U^{234}/Th^{230}).

== Composition ==
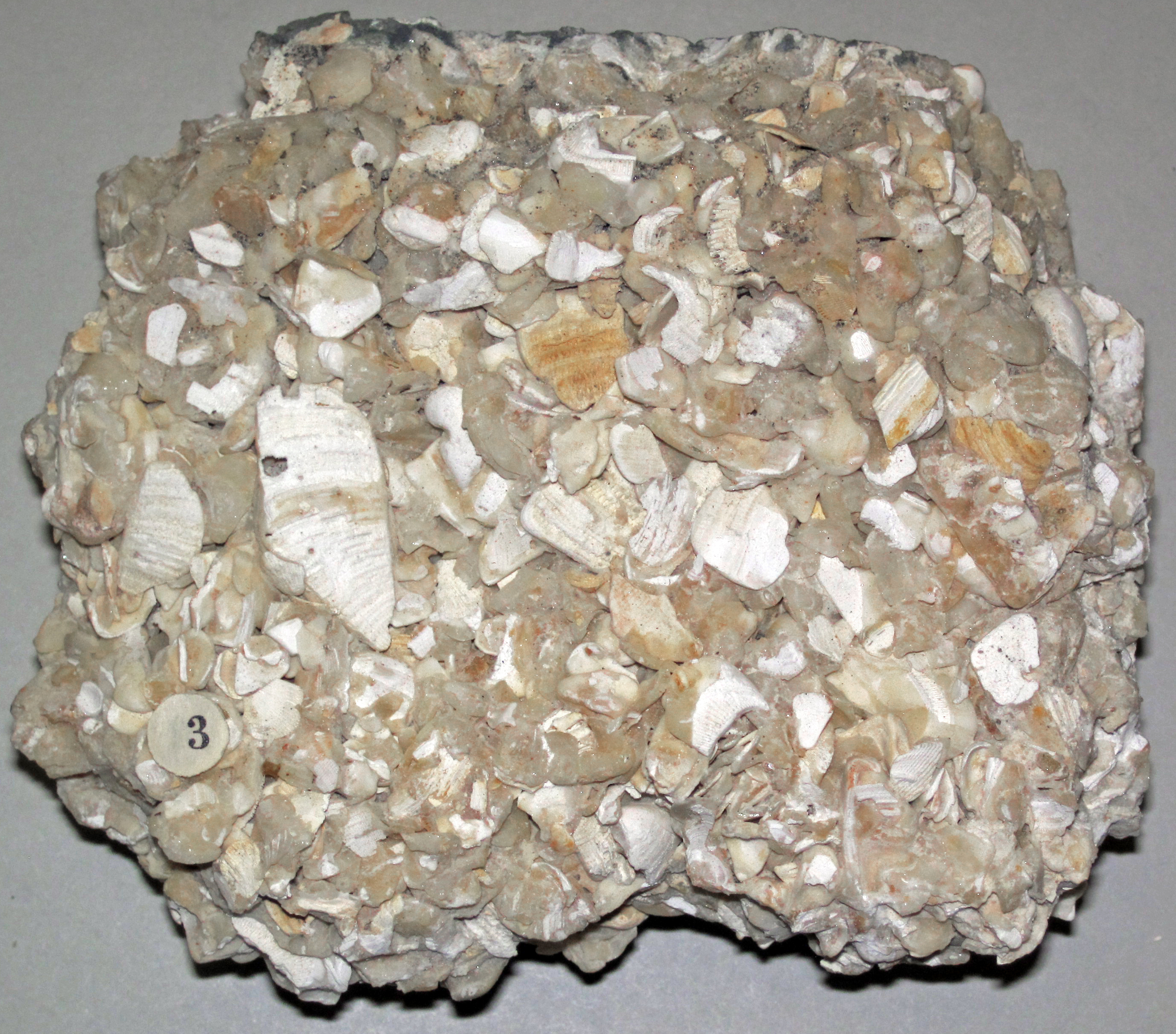
Coquina from the Anastasia Formation (Quaternary; St. Augustine, Florida)

The Anastasia Formation is composed of quartz sands and calcite coquina, with sporadic instances of fossil debris. Coloration of the formation varies from a light grey tone to a soft orange-brown. The formation is soft to moderately hard coquina composed of whole and fragmented mollusk shells within sand often cemented by sparry calcite. Sands occur as fossil-bearing light gray to tan as well as orange-brown, unconsolidated to moderately indurated.

Fossils consist of both vertebral and invertebral species most of which are still present in the current epoch. Poriferans, bryozoans, mollusks, arthropods, and echinoderms have all been seen and recorded within the formation. Vertebrate taxa include cetacean, testudines, perissodactyla, and selachimorpha. Most fossils are highly fragmented with greatest preservation seen in the Blowing Rocks Preserve in Martin County, and regions north of Palm Beach. Bioturbation is also seen in Palm Beach, Martin and Flagler counties. Large and small fossilized burrows formed by invertebrate species are seen in Palm Beach and Martin Counties whereas Flagler County sees large borings formed and fossilized around trees previously present in the area.

The Formation is seen as a relevant portion of the Biscayne Aquifer. It is also an integral part of the surficial aquifer system in northern portions of Florida.
