= Highland Beach, Florida =

Town in the state of Florida, United States

- Town
- Town of Highland Beach
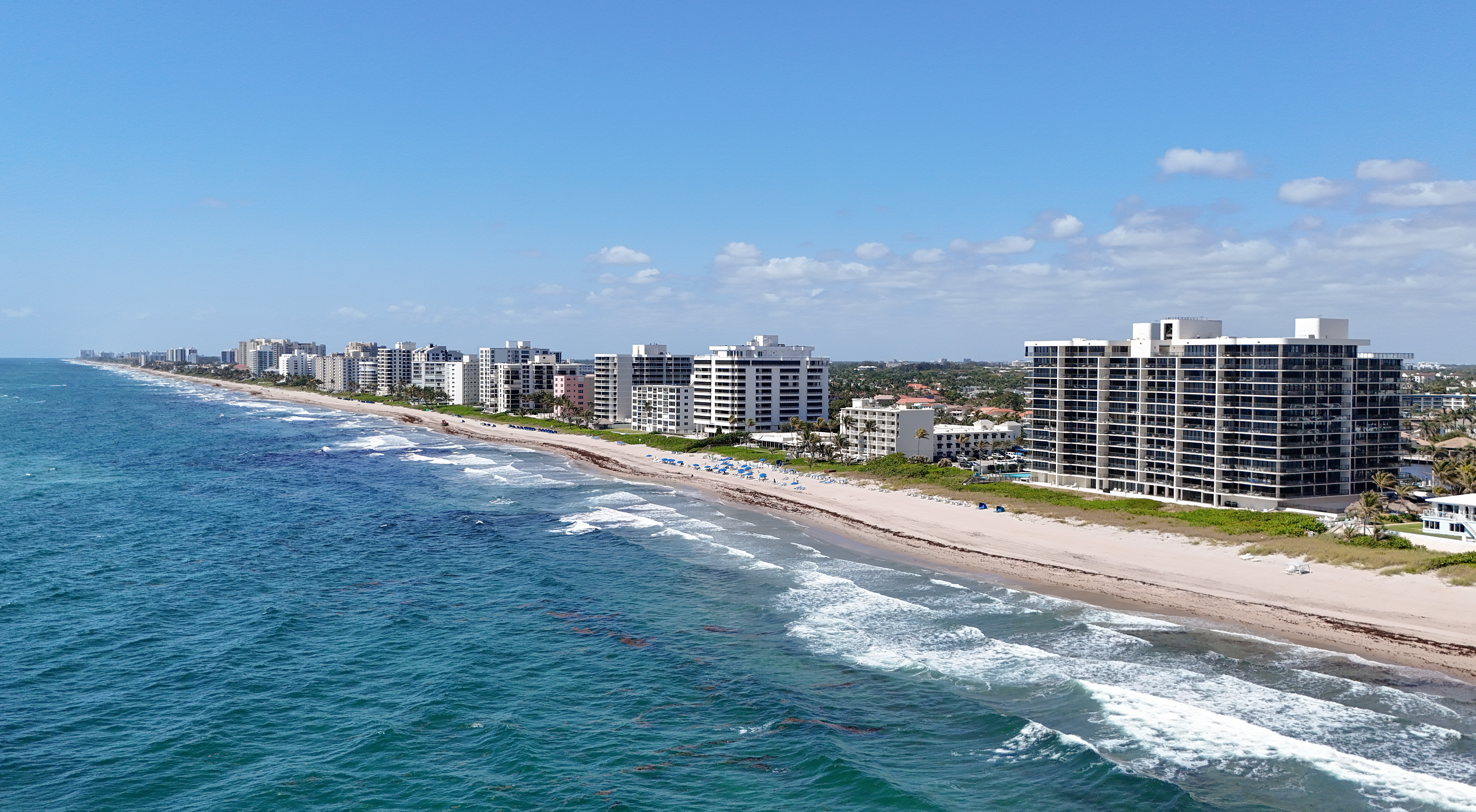
- Highland Beach skyline

- Seal

- Location of Highland Beach, Florida
- Coordinates: 26°24′32″N 80°03′51″W
- Country: United States
- State: Florida
- County: Palm Beach
- Settled: c. Early 1900s
- Incorporated: December 1949

Government
  - Type: Commission-Manager
  - Mayor: Natasha Moore
  - Vice Mayor: David Stern
  - Commissioners: Evalyn David, Judith Goldberg, and Don Peters
  - Town Manager: Marshall Labadie
  - Town Clerk: Lanelda Gaskins

Area
  - Total: 1.29 sq mi (3.34 km^{2})
  - Land: 0.54 sq mi (1.39 km^{2})
  - Water: 0.75 sq mi (1.95 km^{2})
- Elevation: 7 ft (2.1 m)

Population (2020)
  - Total: 4,295
  - Density: 8,003/sq mi (3,089.8/km^{2})
- Time zone: UTC-5 (Eastern (EST))
  - Summer (DST): UTC-4 (EDT)
- ZIP code: 33487
- Area codes: 561, 728
- FIPS code: 12-30200
- GNIS feature ID: 2405831
- Website: http://www.highlandbeach.us/

Highland Beach is a town in Palm Beach County, Florida, United States. It is part of the Miami metropolitan area of South Florida, and situated 50 miles north of Miami and 28 miles south of Palm Beach. As of the 2020 US census, the population was 4,295.

== History ==
Native Americans were the original settlers dating back to at least 850 A.D., as 170 Tequesta skeletons were discovered in an ancient burial ground during the 1980s, and in 2003, 22 bones of a woman and a two year old were found in the town by a worker who was digging a trench for an underground pipe. It was also a location where pirates and buccaneers would visit.

The first non-indigenous settlers in the Town of Highland Beach were a few Japanese Americans from the Yamato Colony in the early 1900s, and it was officially incorporated as a municipality on December 1949. The southern part of the town's beach was a popular fishing spot for the settlers and their fellow Japanese American pineapple farmers who lived in the Yamato Colony. Their fishing spot was around the beach's limestone and coral rock outcrop, being similar to the ocean side rock formations in the Blowing Rocks Preserve. It was called "Jap Rock" until 2006, when it was renamed "Yamato Rock" because the former name was an ethnic slur for people of Japanese ancestry.

It was named by town leaders for its relatively elevated town site being 20 to 25 feet (6.10 to 7.62 meters) above the high tide line and being higher than the dunes in other beach communities nearby. Highland Beach only has two businesses, which keeps the town almost entirely residential. The two businesses are The Delray Sands Resort and O'Grady Realty. The Delray Sands Resort was formerly a Holiday Inn. Both businesses operate out of the same building.

== Geography ==
According to the United States Census Bureau, the town has a total area of 1.29 square miles (3.3 km^{2}), of which 0.537 square miles (1.39 km^{2}) is land and 0.753 square miles (1.95 km^{2}) is water.

== Demographics ==
=== 2020 census ===
Highland Beach racial composition (Hispanics excluded from racial categories) (NH = Non-Hispanic)
Race	Number	Percentage
White (NH)	3,873	90.17%
Black or African American (NH)	20	0.47%
Native American or Alaska Native (NH)	2	0.05%
Asian (NH)	81	1.89%
Pacific Islander or Native Hawaiian (NH)	4	0.09%
Some other race (NH)	20	0.47%
Two or more races/Multiracial (NH)	65	1.51%
Hispanic or Latino (any race)	230	5.36%
Total	4,295	

As of the 2020 census, Highland Beach had a population of 4,295. The median age was 69.8 years, with 3.8% of residents under age 18 and 61.6% aged 65 or older. For every 100 females, there were 89.5 males, and for every 100 females age 18 and over, there were 89.7 males.

As of 2020, 100.0% of residents lived in urban areas, while 0.0% lived in rural areas.

In 2020, there were 2,441 households and 1,285 families in Highland Beach. Of all households, 5.5% had children under the age of 18, 51.9% were married-couple households, 16.8% were households with a male householder and no spouse or partner present, and 26.6% were households with a female householder and no spouse or partner present. About 36.7% of households were made up of individuals, and 26.0% had someone living alone who was 65 years of age or older.

In 2020, there were 4,338 housing units, of which 43.7% were vacant. The homeowner vacancy rate was 2.0% and the rental vacancy rate was 10.2%.

=== 2010 census ===
Highland Beach Demographics
2010 Census	Highland Beach	Palm Beach County	Florida
Total population	3,539	1,320,134	18,801,310
Population, percent change, 2000 to 2010	-6.3%	+16.7%	+17.6%
Population density	7,222.4/sq mi	670.2/sq mi	350.6/sq mi
White or Caucasian (including White Hispanic)	97.7%	73.5%	75.0%
(Non-Hispanic White or Caucasian)	94.6%	60.1%	57.9%
Black or African-American	0.3%	17.3%	16.0%
Hispanic or Latino (of any race)	3.6%	19.0%	22.5%
Asian	0.7%	2.4%	2.4%
Native American or Native Alaskan	0.0%	0.5%	0.4%
Pacific Islander or Native Hawaiian	0.0%	0.1%	0.1%
Two or more races (Multiracial)	0.6%	2.3%	2.5%
Some Other Race	0.2%	3.9%	3.6%

As of the 2010 United States census, there were 3,539 people, 1,962 households, and 1,161 families residing in the town.

=== 2000 census ===
Historical population
Census	Pop.	Note	%±
1950	52		—
1960	65		25.0%
1970	624		860.0%
1980	2,030		225.3%
1990	3,209		58.1%
2000	3,775		17.6%
2010	3,539		−6.3%
2020	4,295		21.4%
U.S. Decennial Census

Highland Beach, Florida

At the 2000 census there were 3,775 people, 2,192 households, and 1,227 families in the town. The population density was 7,705.7 inhabitants per square mile (2,975.2/km^{2}). There were 3,677 housing units at an average density of 7,505.6 per square mile (2,897.9/km^{2}). The racial makeup of the town was 98.33% White (95.6% were Non-Hispanic White), 0.37% African American, 0.05% Native American, 0.37% Asian, 0.11% from other races, and 0.77% from two or more races. Hispanic or Latino of any race were 2.97%.

In 2000, of the 2,192 households, 4.6% had children under the age of 18 living with them, 53.2% were married couples living together, 1.5% had a female householder with no husband present, and 44.0% were non-families. 38.1% of households were one person and 23.4% were one person aged 65 or older. The average household size was 1.72 and the average family size was 2.15.

In 2000, the age distribution was 3.9% under the age of 18, 1.4% from 18 to 24, 12.7% from 25 to 44, 28.8% from 45 to 64, and 53.3% 65 or older. The median age was 66 years. For every 100 females, there were 88.4 males. For every 100 females age 18 and over, there were 87.8 males.

In 2000, the median household income was $72,989 and the median family income was $95,217. Males had a median income of $87,160 versus $40,357 for females. The per capita income for the town was $67,288. None of the families and 2.1% of the population were living below the poverty line, including no under eighteens and 2.0% of those over 64.

As of 2000, speakers of English as a first language accounted for 90.63% of all residents, while German accounted for 3.26%, Spanish consisted of 2.22%, French was at 2.08%, and Yiddish made up 1.78% of the population.

As of 2000, Highland Beach had the tenth highest percentage of Austrian residents in the US, with 4.0% of the populace (tied with Mondovi, Wisconsin). Although the language percentages of Highland Beach didn't necessarily reflect the residents' ancestry, it had the thirty-sixth highest percentage of Russian residents in the US, at 10.90% of the town's population (tied with Atlantic Beach, New York), and the seventh highest percentage of Turkish residents in the US, at 1.20% of its population (tied with five other US areas, including Bay Harbor Islands).
