= Loggerhead Park =

Park in Juno Beach, Florida, United States

Coordinates: 26.88488°N 80.05577°W

Loggerhead Park is a 17-acre recreational area in Juno Beach, Florida with a beach. It includes the Loggerhead Marinelife Center, an ocean conservation organization and sea turtle hospital. Loggerhead Marinelife Center manages the Juno Beach fishing pier, across the street from the park. The park is adjacent to Juno Dunes Natural Area off U.S. Highway 1.

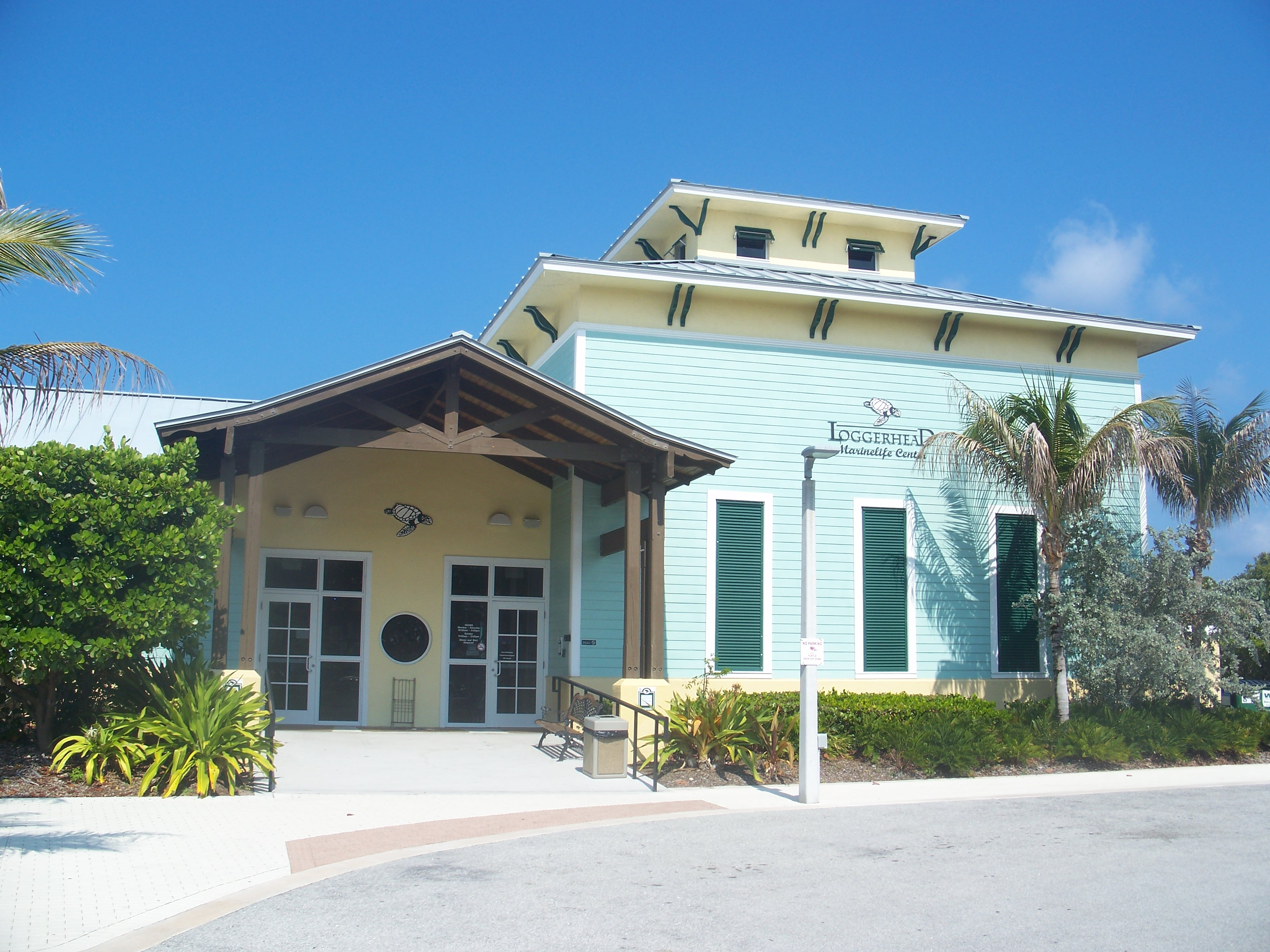
Loggerhead Marinelife center

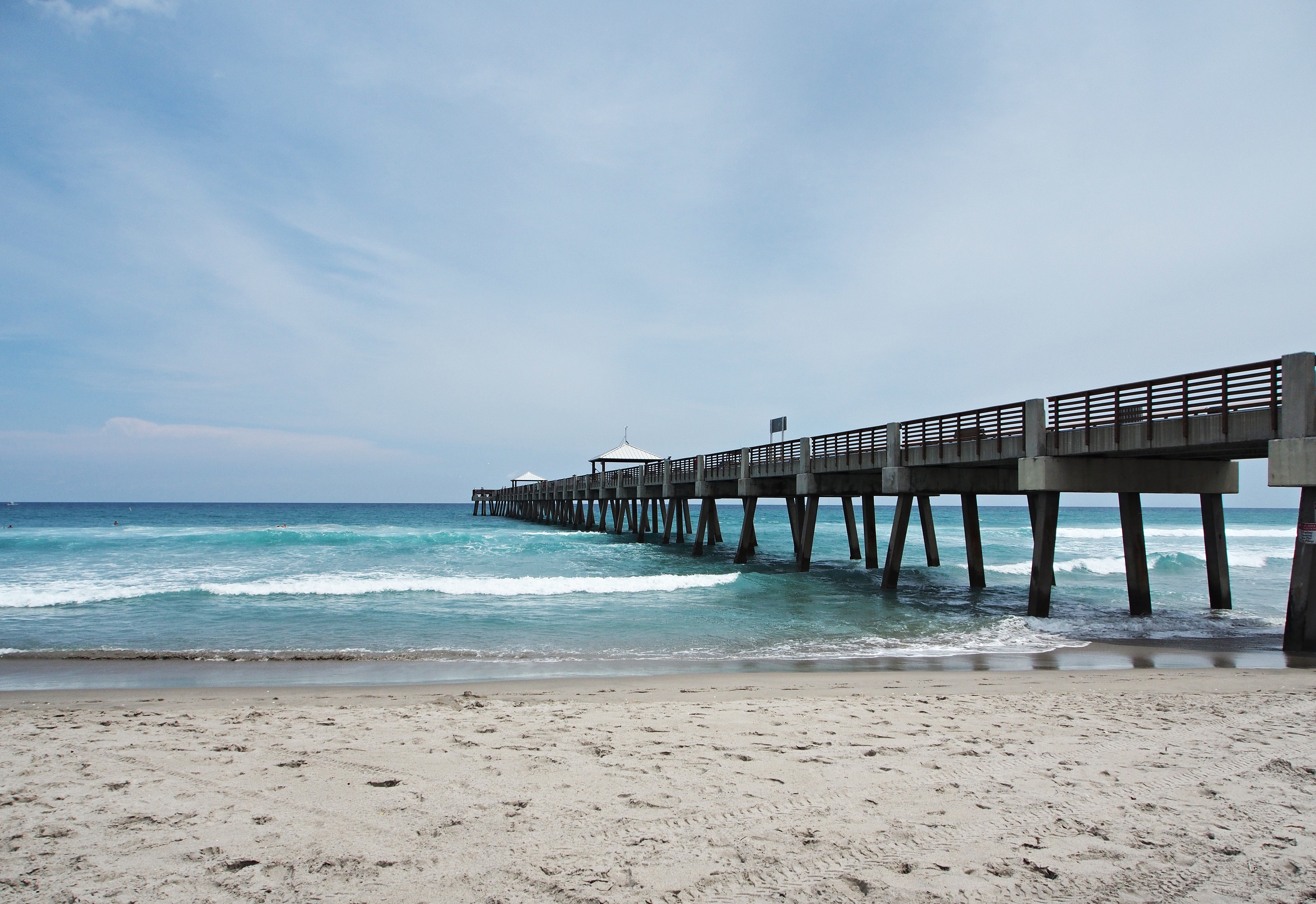
Juno Beach Pier
