= Loggerhead Marinelife Center =

Sea turtle center in Juno Beach, Florida, US

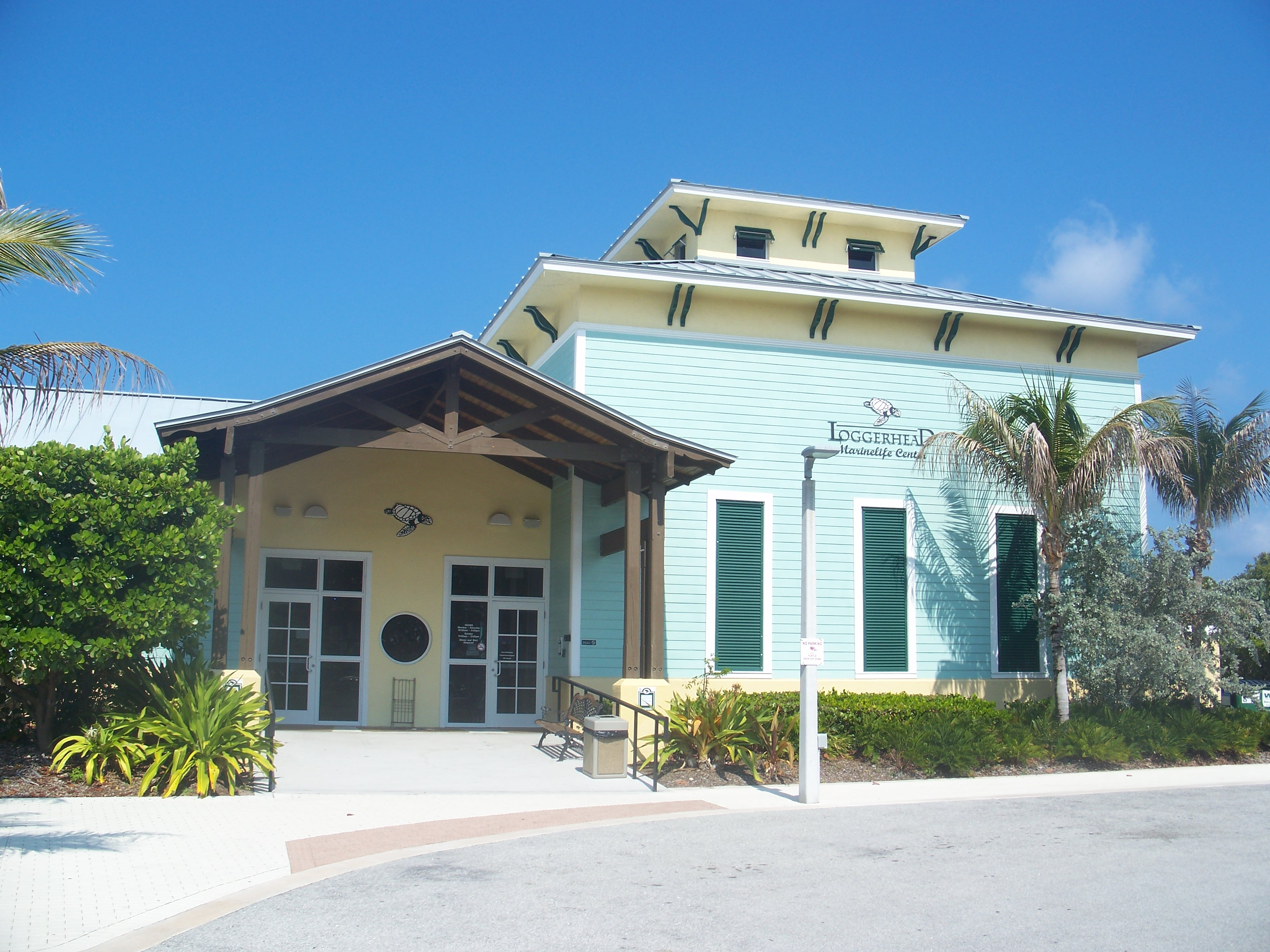
- Established: 1983
- Location: 14200 U.S Highway 1 Juno Beach, Florida
- Coordinates: 26.8847°N 80.0562°W
- Type: Wildlife rehabilitation center
- Website: marinelife.org

Loggerhead Marinelife Center, located in Loggerhead Park, Juno Beach, Florida, is a sea turtle research, rehabilitation, education and conservation center. The center also manages the Juno Beach fishing pier, across the street from the park. Established in 1983, the Loggerhead Marinelife Center seeks to promote conservation of ocean ecosystems with a special focus on threatened and endangered sea turtles. Its facilities include a sea turtle hospital, a research laboratory, and exhibit areas including live sea turtles and other coastal creatures.

== Conservation initiatives ==
In 2014, Loggerhead Marinelife Center staff began partnering with other sea turtle organizations to rescue turtles accidentally hooked on fishing piers. After spending time in critical sea turtle habitat around the world, staff realized that many of the issues faced by partners are greater than incidental capture alone.

Project SHIELD is a multi-faceted program that provides conservation solutions to fishing piers, recreational boaters, beach-side hotels, snorkel and SCUBA operators, fishing charter operators, and beach access points, as well as pollution prevention projects. Conservation Initiatives under Project SHIELD include promoting environmental sustainability, working to ban balloons on beaches, monofilament recycling, the Responsible Pier Initiative and working to eliminate trash in oceans.

LMC's conservation initiatives have reached Florida, Hawaii, North Carolina, Virginia, Texas, Greece, Turkey and Puerto Rico.

== Programs and activities ==
The center hosts astronomy nights, guided beach walks, Boy Scout and Girl Scout programs, Eco Tours (SWIM), evening turtle walks, hatchling releases, a marine summer camp program, sea turtle releases, water quality monitoring, beach cleanups and many other education programs, activities and events.

== Juno Beach Pier ==
Loggerhead Marinelife Center manages the Juno Beach Pier, a 900-foot fishing pier located in Juno Beach, Florida. The pier participates in the Responsible Pier Initiative which promotes responsible fishing and conservation. In 1999, the town of Juno Beach opened the Juno Beach Pier as a pedestrian pier. Activities on the pier conducted through Loggerhead Marinelife Center include a kid's fishing program, field trips, and private fishing lessons.

== In popular culture ==
- Boston Globe – Shell-shocked Florida Refugees
- National Geographic – Florida by Water: See Sea Turtles in the Wild
- The Washington Post – At a South Florida hospital, heroes for the half-shell
