= Juno Dunes Natural Area =

Nature preserve and park in Palm Beach County, Florida

Coordinates: 26.880°N 80.062°W

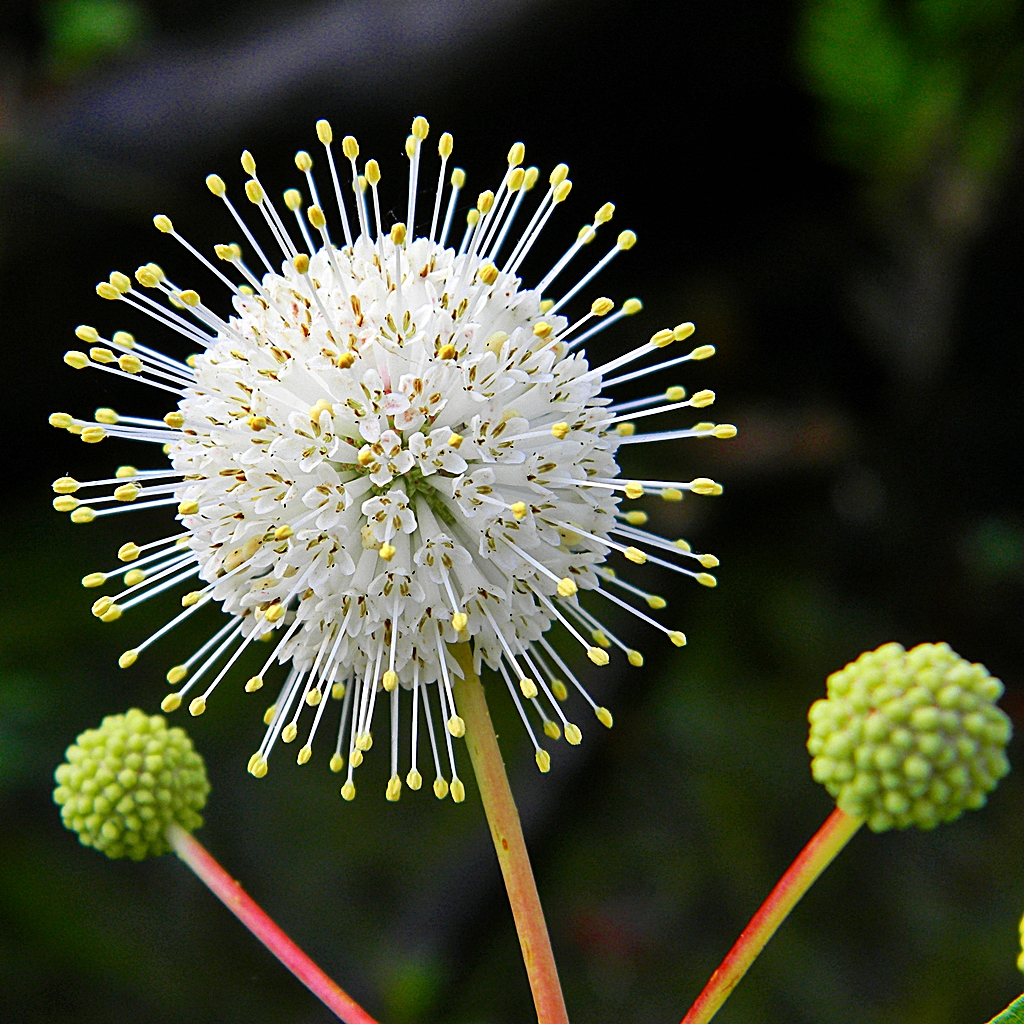
Buttonbush (Cephalanthus occidentalis).

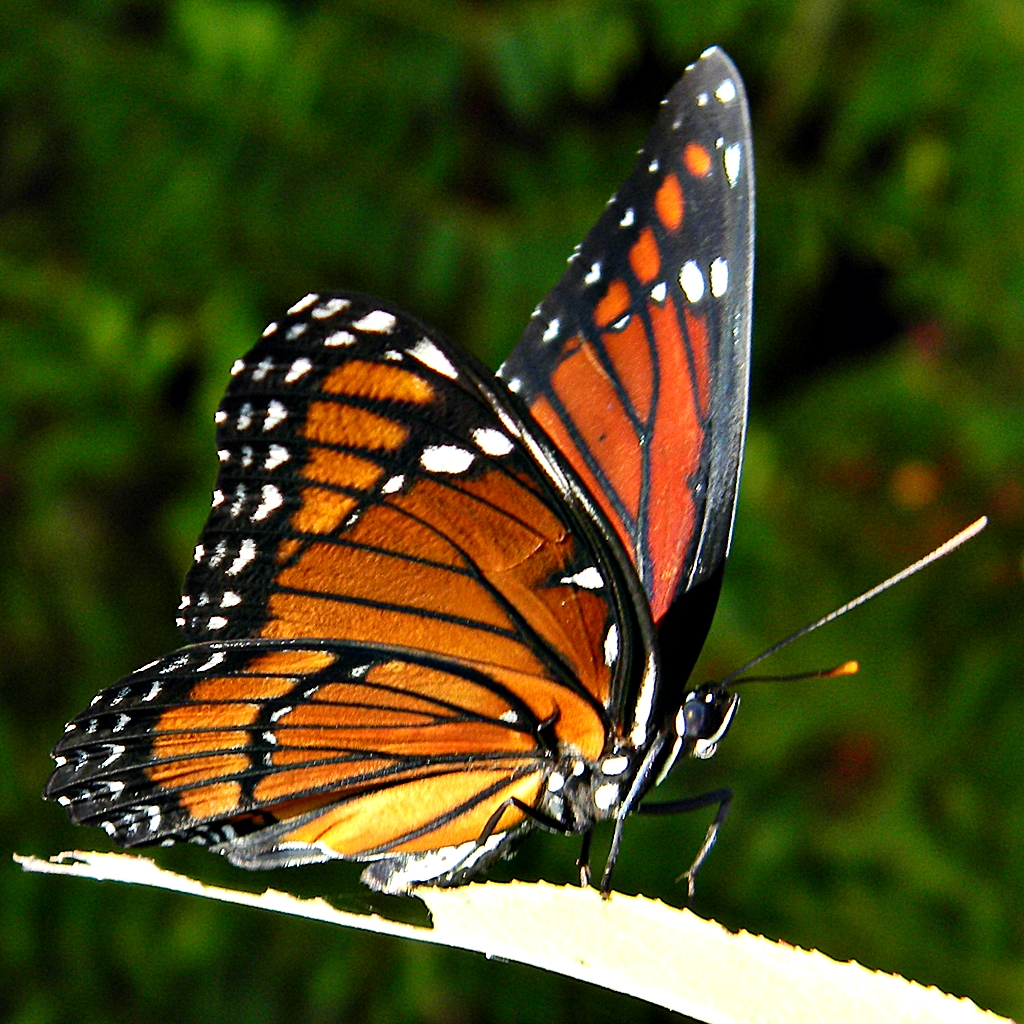
Florida Viceroy butterfly.

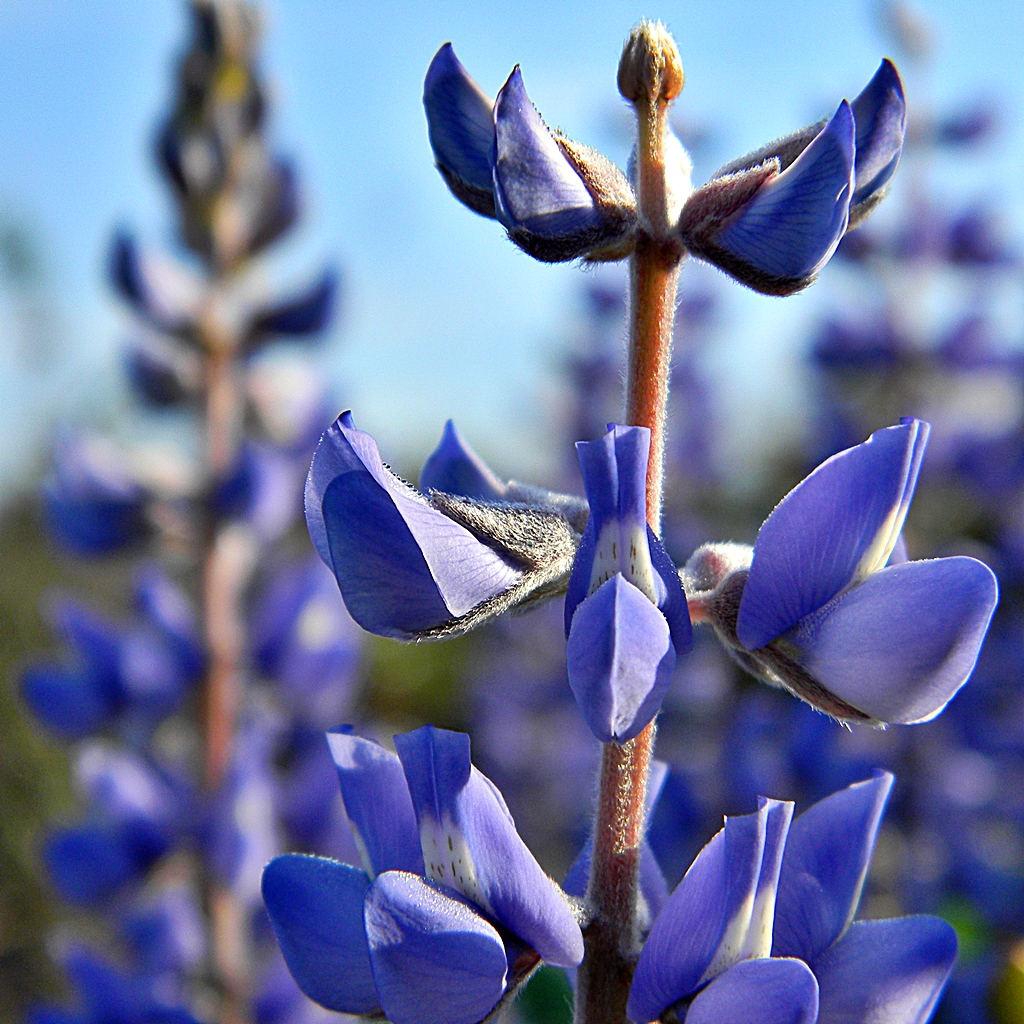
Sky Blue Lupine (Lupinus diffusus) in the dunes.

Juno Dunes Natural Area is a 576-acre (233 ha) nature preserve and park in Palm Beach County, Florida.

== Geography ==
The 569 acre preserve in Juno Beach ranges from the Atlantic to the Intracoastal Waterway. It is the largest tract of the Atlantic Coastal Ridge in Palm Beach County. It is divided into two tracts by U.S. Highway 1. Kiosks at the entrances provide detailed information about the flora and fauna within the natural areas. Printed brochures with maps are available there as well.

The entrance to the Oceanfront Tract is located on the eastern end of Erikson Way in Loggerhead Park. A wheelchair accessible trail leads through a dense and shady hammock before emerging into a coastal scrub. It ends in an observation platform which, at an elevation of 44 feet, is one of the highest natural points in Palm Beach County. It also has sandy trails that lead down to the ocean.

The main entrance to the West Tract is located on the west side of U.S. Highway 1, at 14501 U.S. Highway 1, 1/2 mile north of Donald Ross Road. The wheelchair accessible Sawgrass Nature Trail becomes a boardwalk running through a seasonal wetland and ends in a shaded observation platform. Other non-paved trails lead through the scrub, forest and hammock zones, which are habitats for threatened gopher tortoises. This is part of the Great Florida Birding Trail. The tract is also accessible to boaters from docks on the Intracoastal Waterway. The West Tract has an additional section south of Donald Ross and its Scrub Hickory Nature Trail can be entered from Ellison Wilson Road across the street from Bert Winters Park.

Juno Dunes includes an area of coastal ridge and extends from the Atlantic Ocean to the Intracoastal Waterway and is adjacent to Loggerhead Park.

== Ecology ==
Natural habitats at Juno Dunes include:

- Florida scrub
- beach and dunes
- coastal strand
- maritime hammock
- freshwater wetland
