= Biscayne Aquifer =

Geologic formation in Florida, United States

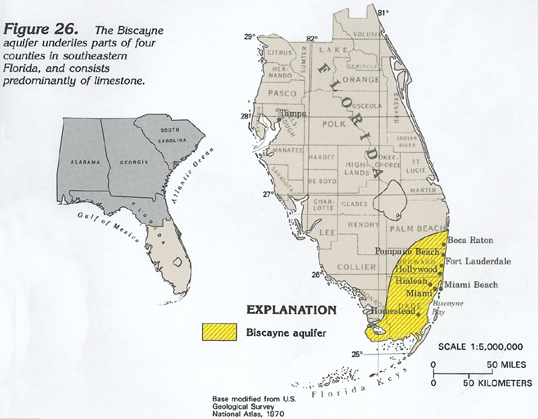
A map of the aquifer.

The Biscayne Aquifer, named after Biscayne Bay, is a surficial aquifer. It is a shallow layer of highly permeable limestone under a portion of South Florida. The area it underlies includes Broward County, Miami-Dade County, Monroe County, and Palm Beach County, a total of about 4,000 square miles (10,000 km^{2}).

== Description ==
Most of the Biscayne Aquifer sits in the Miami Limestone formation and that part of the Fort Thompson Formation that underlies the Miami Limestone. The Biscayne Aquifer extends from southeastern Palm Beach County through most of Broward County, all of Miami-Dade County, and southern mainland Monroe County.

The Biscayne Aquifer is recharged by rain and by the seepage of surface water in the Everglades into the western part of the aquifer. The aquifer is highly permeable, and the groundwater flows rapidly eastward and southward, discharging into the Atlantic Ocean (north of Miami-Dade County), Biscayne Bay, and Florida Bay. Drainage canals and well fields affect the direction and rate of the flow. Freshwater springs were historically common along the western shore of and under Biscayne Bay, but the drainage of the Everglades during the 20th century reduced the flow of groundwater, and what springs can still be found in and around the bay are now brackish.

Because the top part of the Biscayne aquifer is the water table, this aquifer is known as an unconfined aquifer. Since it merges with the floor of Biscayne Bay and with the Atlantic Ocean, it is also a coastal aquifer.

Both of these factors contribute to its potential contamination. Lowered water tables, primarily from over-pumping, could allow salt water intrusion without man-made interventions such as dam-like structures that control fresh and salt water levels in canals. Because the aquifer is so close to the surface, it is extremely vulnerable to surface contaminants. A massive saltwater plume is radiating from the Turkey Point Nuclear Generating Station toward wellfields in the aquifer. The water-absorbing layers of rock underlying south Florida divide into three layers. The Biscayne Aquifer is closest to the surface and because of this it directly interacts with natural and man-made bodies of surface water, such as streams, lakes, canals and reservoirs. The ground water and the aquifer currently are managed as an integrated water system.

== Structure ==
Both the Fort Thompson Formation and the Miami Limestone were laid down on the southeastern margin of the Florida Platform. The formations consist of limestone facies of marine, brackish, and freshwater origin produced as changes in sea level alternately covered and exposed the platform. Storage and permeability in the formations is mediated largely by vugs (small cavities). Interparticle and separate vugs provide capacity for storing water, while vugs that touch facilitate flow. Many of the touching-vugs are biogenic, created by fossil molds, burrows, and roots. Permeability varies between facies in the formations, depending on the conditions present at their formation. Deeper layers tend to be more permeable than more shallow layers, possibly because they have been subject more often to dissolution and erosion while above sea level. Passages in bedding-planes, solution pipes, and caves are also elements in the storage and flow of water.

== Management ==
The South Florida Water Management District controls an extensive system of canals and other control systems and pumping stations along with the Biscayne Aquifer, Lake Okeechobee and three other large water conservation areas as it monitors and controls the storage and release of the water in the district. It must take into account the danger of salt water intrusion and monitor water demand while it manages surplus flood water and maintains water table levels and adequate water supplies.

The Biscayne Aquifer is the primary source of fresh water for the South Florida metropolitan area, including cities stretching from Homestead in southern Miami-Dade County to Delray Beach in southern Palm Beach County. The only reliable supply of fresh water for the Florida Keys is pumped from the Biscayne Aquifer at a well field in southern Miami-Dade County and transported to communities along the keys to Key West via the Florida Keys Aqueduct.

== Sources ==
- Cunningham, Kevin J.; Florea, Lee J. (2009). "The Biscayne Aquifer of Southeastern Florida". Caves and Karst of America. pp. 196–199 – via Western Kentucky University Digital Commons.
