= Blowing Rocks Preserve =

Nature preserve in Florida, USA

- IUCN category V (protected landscape/seascape)
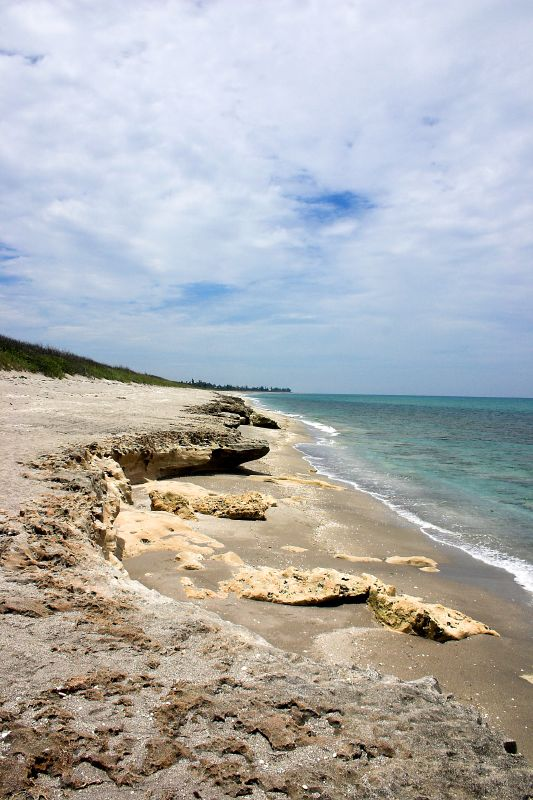
- View north along the beach, showing Anastasia Formation outcropping

- Location within Florida
- Interactive map of Blowing Rocks Preserve
- Location: Hobe Sound, Martin County, Florida, United States
- Nearest city: Tequesta
- Coordinates: 26°58′28″N 80°04′52″W
- Area: 30 ha (74 acres)
- Established: 1969
- Governing body: The Nature Conservancy
- Website: Blowing Rocks Preserve

Blowing Rocks Preserve is a 73-acre (30 ha) environmental preserve on Jupiter Island in Hobe Sound, Martin County, Florida, USA, extending longitudinally between the southernmost Indian River and the Atlantic Ocean. Local residents gifted The Nature Conservancy with the site in 1969, which it has established and owned as a preserve since. It contains the largest limestone outcropping on the state's east coast, part of the Anastasia Formation. Breaking waves spray plumes of water up to 50 feet (15 m) in height through erosional holes, hence the moniker blowing rocks; this distinctive spectacle thus earned the limestone outcrop's name. The limestone outcropping also encompasses coquina, crustaceans, and sand, protruding visibly from the beach.

The preserve also features several natural communities, including oak and tropical hardwood hammock; mangrove swamp, salt marsh, mudflats, and an estuary; and coastal strand and oceanside dunes. Common native plants include sea grapes, gumbo limbo, coral bean, and Sabal palms. Migratory birds such as warblers, seabirds, and raptors (mainly falcons and hawks) frequent the preserve; three sea turtle species—loggerhead, green, and leatherback—nest on the beach as well. The preserve includes an educational center, native plant nursery, boardwalk, oceanside path, and butterfly garden. Named for philanthropist Rosita Hawley Wright, the Hawley Education Center features rotating natural history and art exhibits, and offers environmental education classes and workshops. A boardwalk along the Indian River Lagoon contains interpretive signs about the plants, wildlife, and environs.

Following its creation, the preserve removed an old roadbed atop the oceanfront dune to reduce vehicular traffic. In the 1980s the preserve undertook large-scale ecological restoration efforts, in part by removing dredge spoil, a byproduct of the Intracoastal Waterway. From 1985–2000 over 3,000 people volunteered 78,000 hours removing thousands of Brazilian peppers, Australian pines, and other invasive exotic plants; planted 15,000 native seedlings; and installed and mended a dozen tidal culverts, forming four ponds and 3/4 mi (1.2 km) of tidal creeks. In the 1990s staff added interpretive displays to accommodate more visitors, highlighting native species and habitats. To this day invasive plants are continuously removed in order to preserve indigenous flora.

== Gallery ==
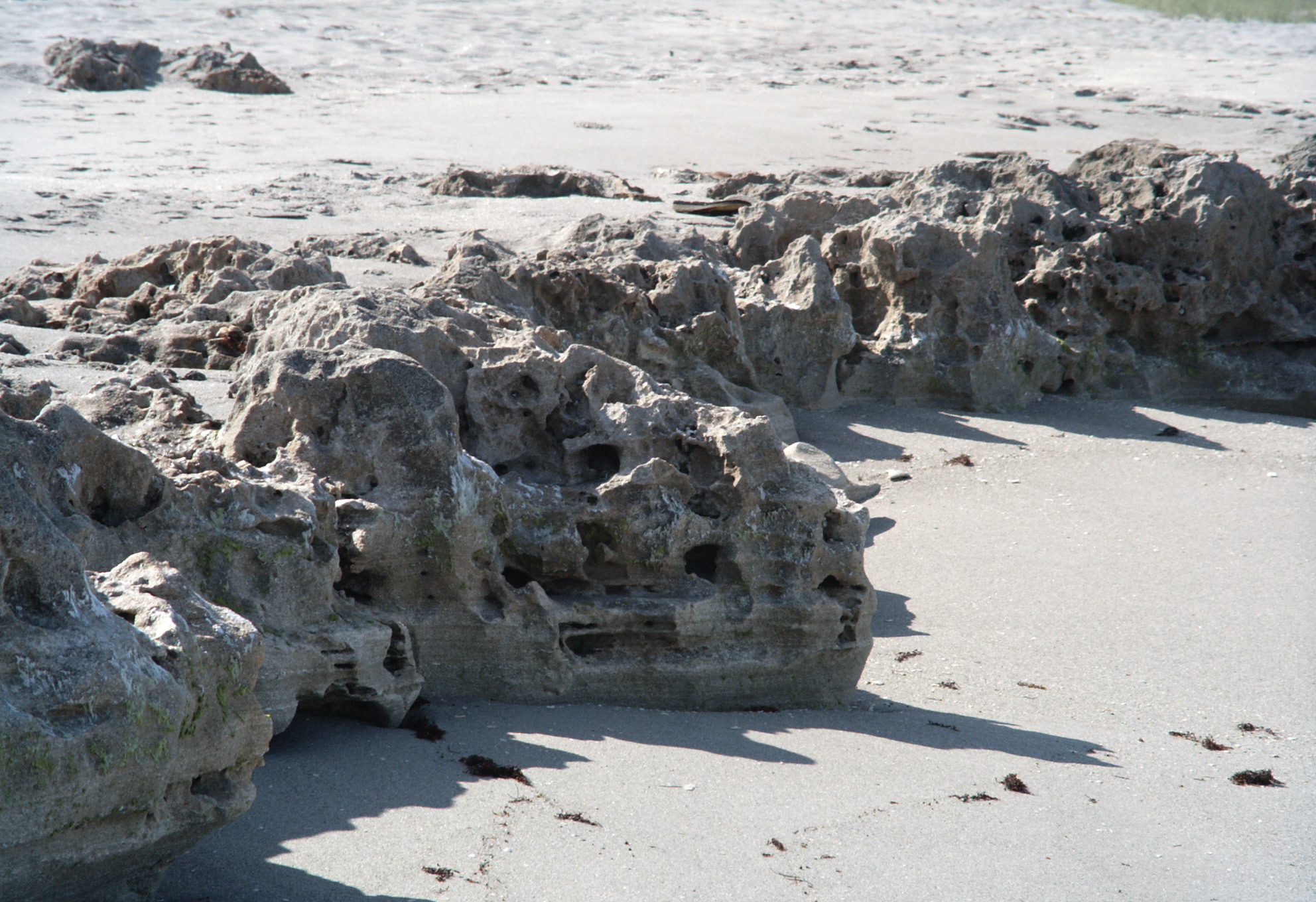
Limestone seen along the shoreline at low tide

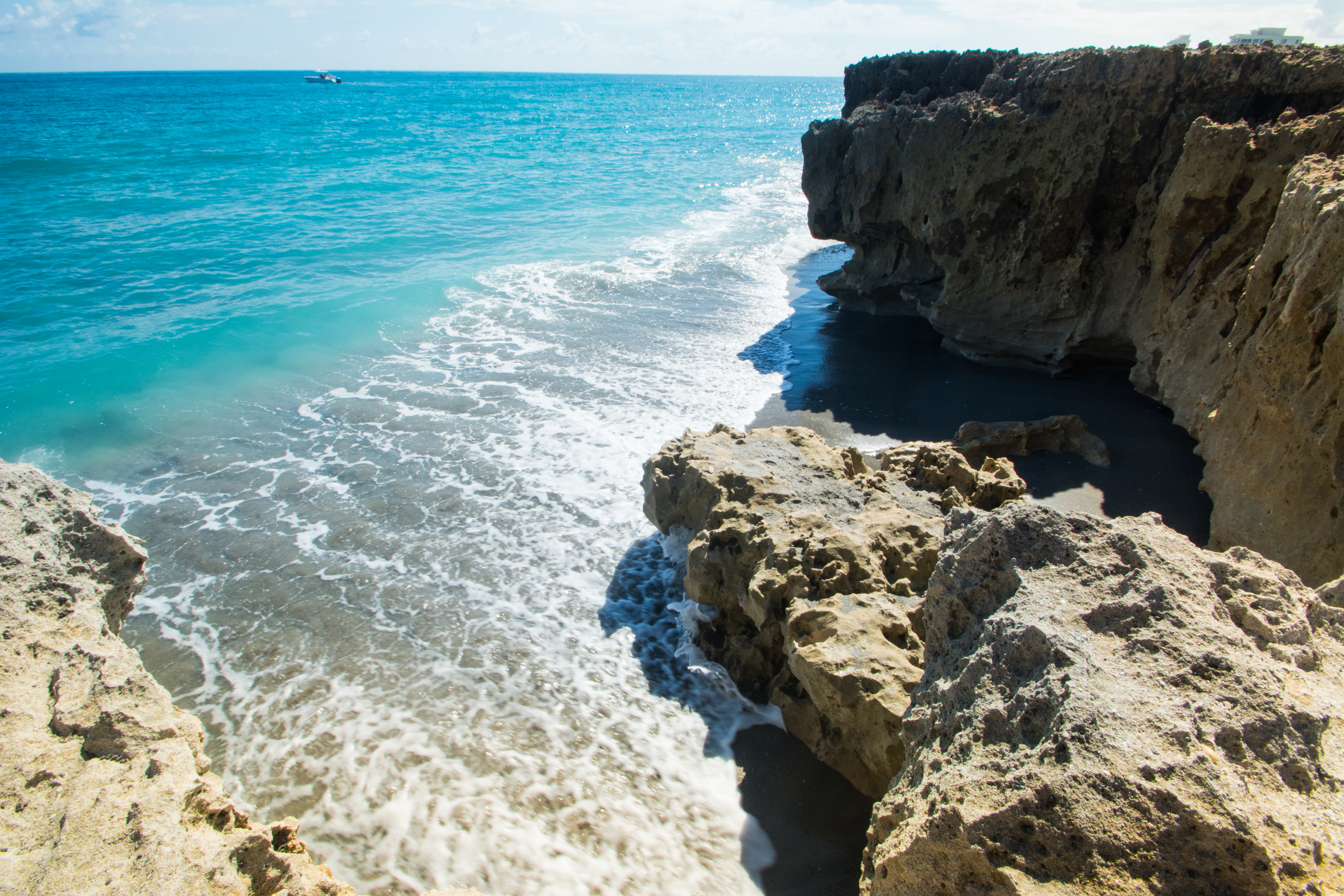
Another view of the feature

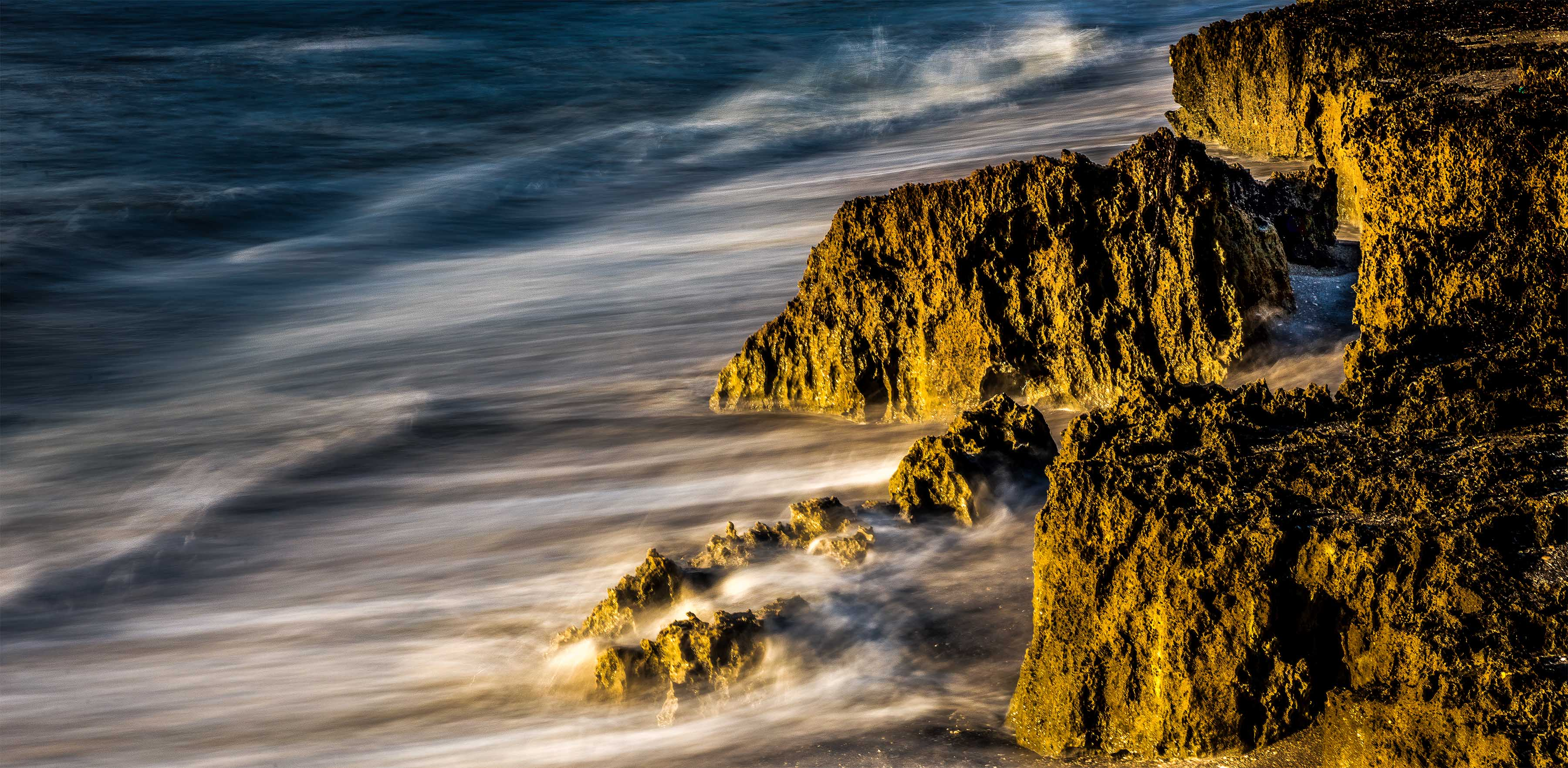
Tide among rocks

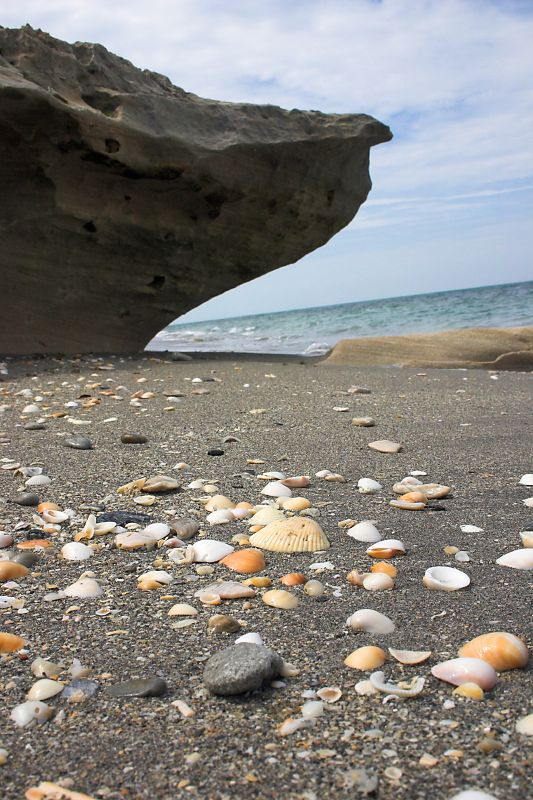
Shells beside rocks

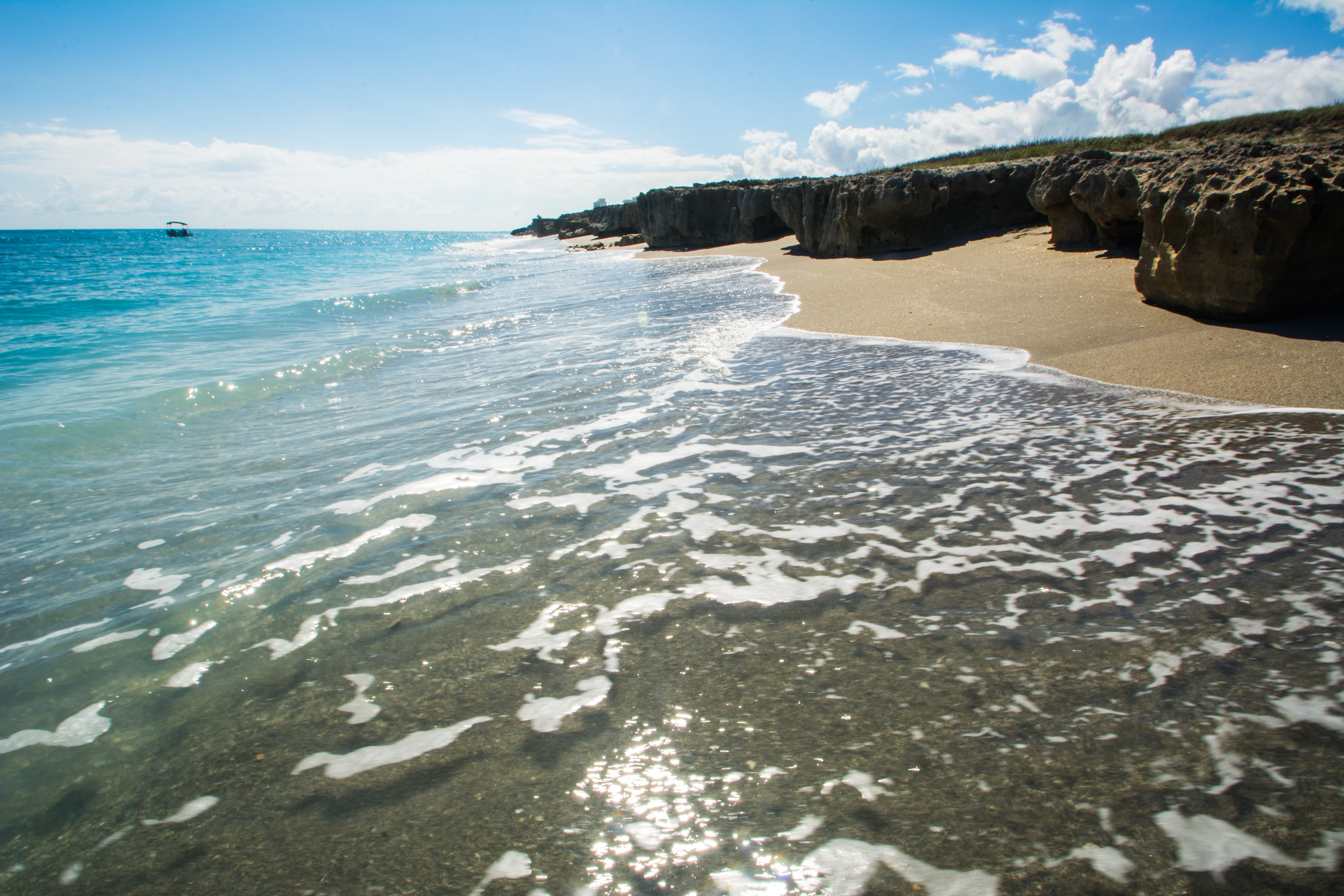
View south along coast

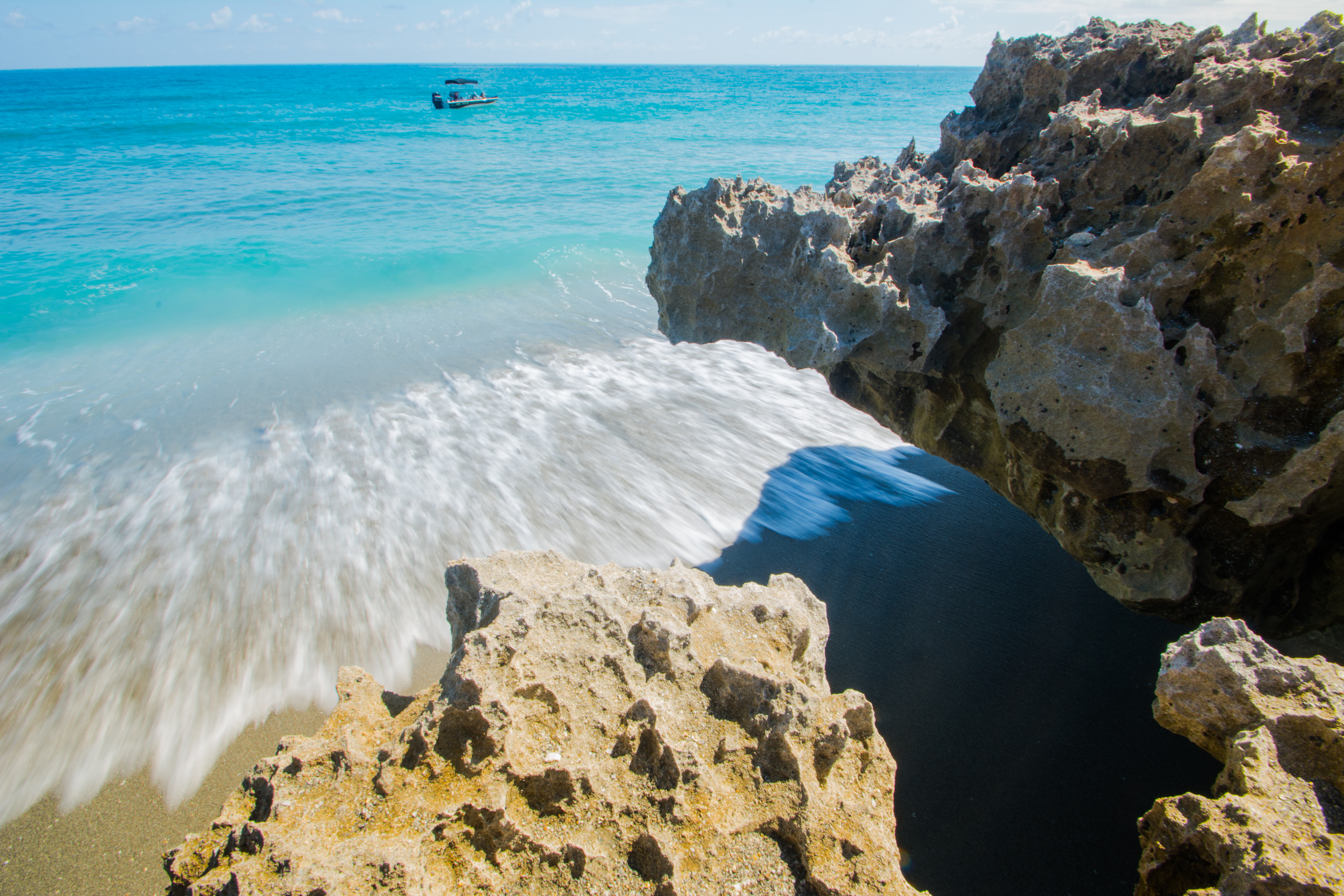
Rock overhang

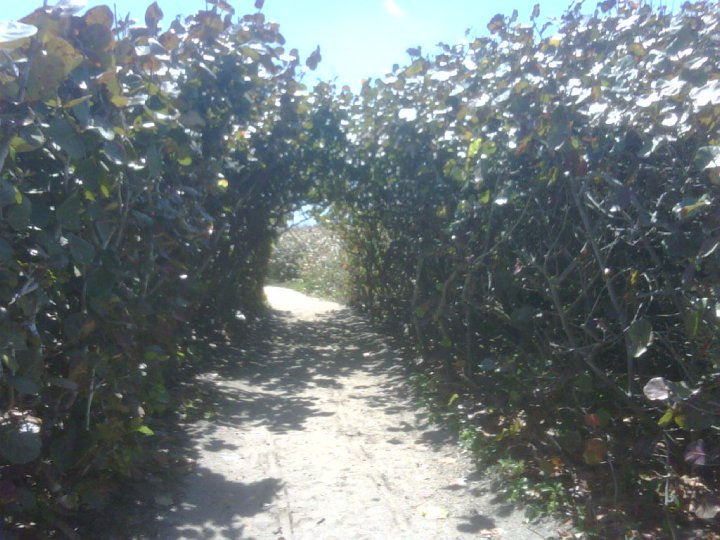
Seaside path beneath sea grapes

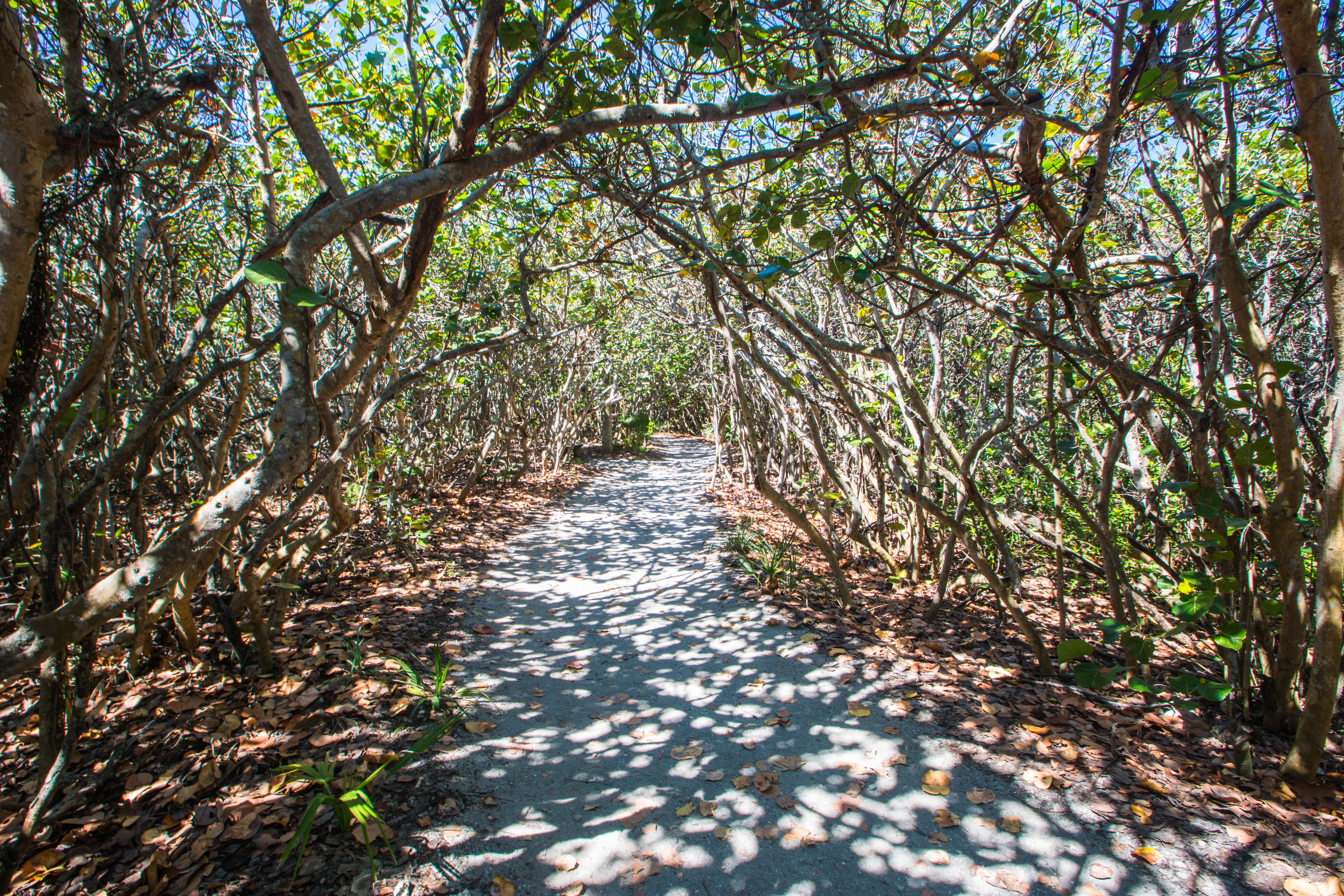
Nature trail

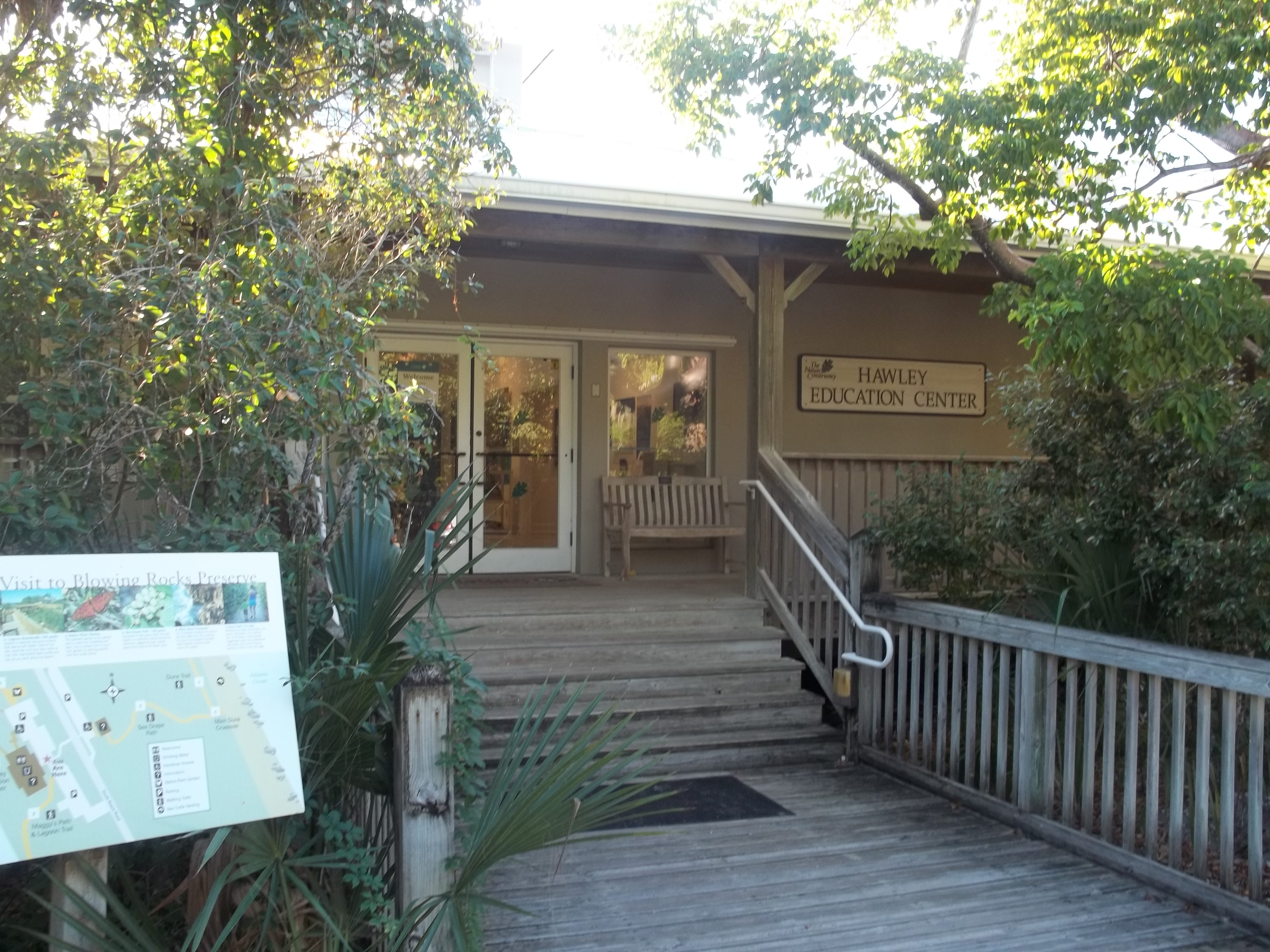
Hawley Education Center

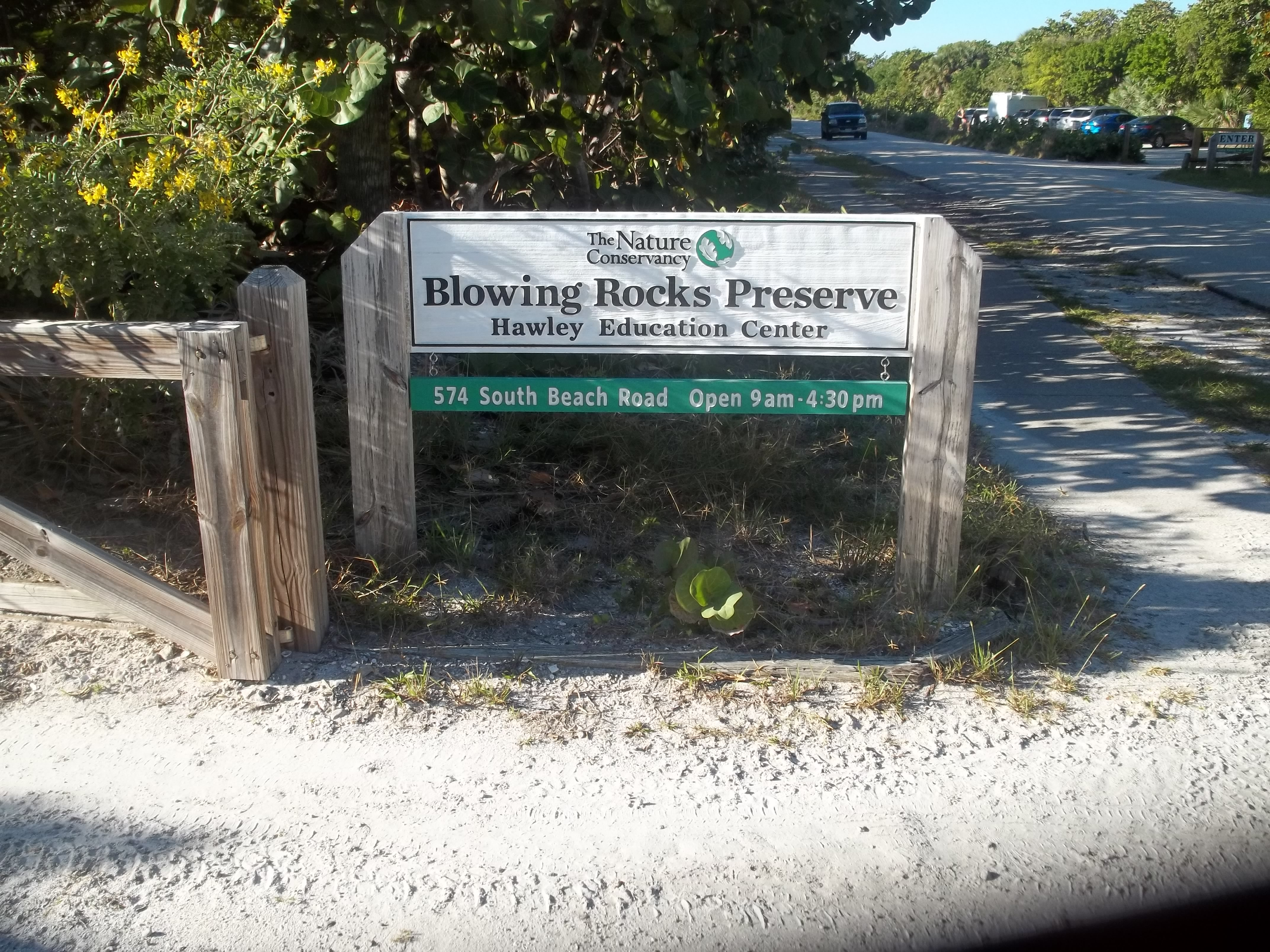
Entrance sign
