= Surficial aquifer =

Shallow, thin aquifer

Surficial aquifers are shallow aquifers typically less than 50 feet (15 m) thick, but larger surficial aquifers of about 60 feet (18 m) have been mapped. They mostly consist of unconsolidated sand enclosed by layers of limestone, sandstone or clay and the water is commonly extracted for urban use. The aquifers are replenished by streams and from precipitation and can vary in volume considerably as the water table fluctuates. Being shallow, they are susceptible to contamination by fuel spills, industrial discharge, landfills, and saltwater. Parts of southeastern United States are dependent on surficial aquifers for their water supplies.

== Composition ==
Surficial aquifers system consists mostly of beds of unconsolidated sand, cavity-riddled limestone and shells, sandstone, sand, and clay sand with minor clay or silt from the Pliocene to Holocene periods.

In most cases the flow system is undivided, though in places, clay beds are sufficiently thick and continuous to divide the system into two or three aquifers. Complex interbedding of fine and coarse-textured rocks is typical of the system. These rocks range from late Miocene to Holocene periods.

In Georgia and South Carolina, unnamed, sandy, marine terrace deposits of Pleistocene age and sand of Holocene age comprise the system. These sandy beds commonly contain clay and silt.

In Florida, these aquifers are shallow beds of sea shells and sand that lie less than 100 feet (30 m) underground. They are separated from the Floridan Aquifer by a confining bed of soil. Some have been contaminated by saltwater, yet they provide most of the public freshwater supply southwest of Lake Okeechobee and along the Atlantic coast north of Palm Beach.

In surficial aquifers, the groundwater continuously moves along the hydraulic gradient from areas of recharge to streams and other places of discharge. Surficial aquifers are recharged locally as the water table fluctuates in response to drought or rainfall. Therefore, the temperature and flow from water-table springs varies.

== Important surficial aquifers ==
The Biscayne Aquifer is a surficial aquifer located in southeast Florida. It covers over 3,000 square miles (7,800 km^{2}), and is the most intensely used water source in Florida, supplying water to Dade County, Broward County, Palm Beach County and Monroe County. The aquifer lies close to the surface and is extremely vulnerable to pollutants that leach through the shallow limestone bedrock. In some areas, it has been contaminated by fuel spills, industrial discharge, landfills, and saltwater.

The Sand and Gravel Aquifer stretches 2,400 square miles (6,200 km^{2}) across the panhandle of Florida and is replenished with rainfall. Over the years water levels have dropped due to water-well use by pumping, and it has been contaminated by industrial waste and saltwater intrusion.

The Chokoloskee Aquifer is surficial aquifer that covers 3,000 square miles (7,800 km^{2}) in southwest Florida. It is recharged by rainfall. It is believed that artificial drainage canals have lowered water levels and increased saltwater intrusion.

== Sources ==
- University of Florida
