= Atlantic Coastal Ridge =

Geomorphological feature in Florida, US

The Atlantic Coastal Ridge is a geomorphological feature paralleling the Atlantic coast of Florida from the border with Georgia to Miami-Dade County, where it transitions into the Miami Rock Ridge. For most of its length it consists of one or more relict beach ridges created when the sea level was about 30 feet (9.1 m) higher than at present. The southernmost part of the Atlantic Coastal Ridge (the Miami Rock Ridge) was created as a carbonate platform during the same period. Before human modification for agriculture and urban development, much of the ridge hosted scrub vegetation.

== Extent ==
The Atlantic Coastal Ridge extends from the St. Marys River, which is the boundary between Florida and Georgia, to west of Homestead in southern Miami-Dade County. The Atlantic Coastal Ridge is a relict beach ridge created during what is called the "Pamlico time". (Note: "Pamlico" refers to a set of features of ancient shorelines, including scarps and terraces, that are observed in the present landscape. The features were created during the Interglacial period between the Early and Late Wisconsin glaciations, when the sea level was 25 to 35 feet (7.6 to 10.7 m) higher than at present.) Except in the southernmost part of the Atlantic Coastal Ridge (in Broward and Miami-Dade counties), the ridge was likely the mainland shore of Florida in the Pamlico period. The profile of the ridge on the sea-ward side closely resembles the current profile of the nearshore underwater slope along the Atlantic coast of Florida, suggesting that the ridge was formed by the same processes that are currently operating along the Florida coast. The preservation of that profile was likely due to a rapid fall of sea level at end of the Pamlico period due to a rapid onset of glaciation at the beginning of the Late Wisconsin. Old dune fields along the ridge were originally covered mainly by the sand pine scrub and scrubby flatwoods varieties of the Florida scrub ecosystem.

== Formation ==
The Anastasia Formation shallowly underlies the Atlantic Coastal Ridge along most of the east coast of Florida. In southernmost Florida, the Anastasia Formation is deeper, 100 feet (30 m) or more under the surface in Miami-Dade County, where it is overlain by Miami Limestone. The Atlantic Coastal Ridge may have two or more parallel ridges which originated as beach ridges and swales produced by longshore drift. Seven parallel ridges have been described in Palm Beach County. The eastern side of the easternmost ridge (on the barrier islands) probably dates from 6,000 to 16,000 years BP. Moving inland the other ridges are progressively lower, and probably date to the Pamlico time. Before urban development eliminated them, there were large areas of scrub on all but the westernmost (and lowest) ridge, which had smaller areas of scrub. In northern Palm Beach County the ridges were 20 to 50 feet (6.1 to 15.2 m) above sea level. In southernmost Palm Beach County the ridges curved towards the west and were irregular. This pattern has been attributed to changes in the channel of the Hillsboro River.

== Miami Rock Ridge ==
The Miami Rock Ridge is a continuation of the Atlantic Coastal Ridge south of Palm Beach County. North of Palm Beach County the Atlantic Coastal Ridge is composed of quartz sand, but south of Palm Beach County it is increasingly composed of calcareous oolite, becoming a relict oolite shoal, a few miles wide and 10 to 15 feet (3.0 to 4.6 m) high. The relict beach ridges that make up the Atlantic Coastal Ridge north of Palm Beach County decrease towards the south, and disappear north of Miami. The Miami Rock Ridge formed as a shoal of calcareous oolite, comparable to the ongoing process on the Bahama Banks. The area in which the Miami Rock Ridge formed is on the edge of the Florida platform. Southward movement of quartz sand along the Florida coast did not reach the area, and the lack of sand and shallow submergence (less than 6 feet (1.8 m)) of the area during the Pamlico time created conditions for oolite to form.

The position of the Miami Rock Ridge largely corresponds with that of Pliocene reef tracts which extended from Palm Beach County to southern Miami-Dade County. The oölitic (upper) facies of the Miami limestone caps the Miami Rock Ridge. It is up to 35 feet (11 m) thick along the ridge summit, but extends only part-way under the Everglades. Valleys that cross the oölitic layer of the ridge probably originated as tidal channels when the sea level was high enough to partially inundate the ridge.

The Atlantic Coastal Ridge, or Miami Rock Ridge, has a maximum elevation of 7.3 m in Miami-Dade County. It has been interpreted as a fossil barrier bar on the sea-ward side with fossil shoals and channels inland to the northwest. The fossil channels underlie depressed features known as transverse glades. The ridge in Miami-Dade County is 2 to 10 miles (3.2 to 16.1 km) wide. North of Homestead the ridge is 8 to 15 feet (2.4 to 4.6 m) above sea level, with some places 20 feet (6.1 m) or more above sea level. West of Homestead, it is 5 to 8 feet (1.5 to 2.4 m) above sea level. The ridge is covered by sand, sometimes very thinly. The ridge has historically been a barrier to water flow from the Everglades, except at a few spots.

== Sources ==
- Austin, Daniel F.; Posin, Freda R.; Burch, James N. (Autumn 1987). "Scrub Species Patterns on the Atlantic Coastal Ridge, Florida". Journal of Coastal Research. 3 (4): 491–498. JSTOR 4297339.
- Deyhup, Mark (December 1990). "Arthropod Footprints in the Sands of Time". The Florida Entomologist. 73 (4): 529–538. doi:10.2307/3495269. JSTOR 3495269.
- Fish, Johnnie E.; Stewart, Mark (1991). Hydrogeology of the Surficial Aquifer System, Dade County, Florida (Water Resources Investigations Report 90-4108) (Report). U.S. Geological Survey.
- Hoffmeister, J. E.; Stockman, K. W.; Multer, H. G. (February 1, 1967). "Miami Limestone of Florida and Its Recent Bahamian Counterpart". GSA Bulletin. 78 (2): 175–190. doi:10.1130/0016-7606(1967)68[175:MLOFAI]2.0.CO;2 (inactive 11 July 2025).
- MacNeil, F. Stearns (1950). Pleistocene Shore Lines in Florida and Georgia (Geological Survey Professional Paper 221-F) (PDF) (Report). U.S. Geological Survey.
- Petuch, Edward J. (Autumn 1986). "The Pliocene Reefs of Miami: Their Geomorphological Significance in the Evolution of the Atlantic Coastal Ridge, Southeastern Florida, U.S.A.". Journal of Coastal Research. 2 (4): 391–408. JSTOR 4297215.
- White, William A. (1970). The Geomorphology of the Florida Peninsula (Geological Bulletin 51) (Report). Florida Bureau of Geology.
