= Turkey Creek =

Turkey Creek may refer to:

== Communities ==
- Turkey Creek, Australia, known as Warmun Community, Western Australia
- Turkey Creek, Arizona
- Turkey Creek, Florida, a rural, unincorporated community in Hillsborough County, Florida
- Turkey Creek, Indiana, an unincorporated community in Steuben County
- Turkey Creek, Kentucky
- Turkey Creek, Louisiana
- Turkey Creek Community Historic District, a historic district in Harrison County, Mississippi

== Creeks ==
=== Canada ===
- Turkey Creek (Windsor, Ontario), a creek crossed by the E. C. Row Expressway

=== United States ===
==== Colorado ====
- Turkey Creek (Colorado), a creek bridged by the Canton Bridge Company, NRHP-listed

==== Florida ====
- Turkey Creek (Econlockhatchee River), Orlando, Florida, United States
- Turkey Creek (Indian River), Malabar and Palm Bay, Florida, United States
  - Turkey Creek Sanctuary, a nature reserve in Palm Bay, Florida
- Turkey Creek Preserve, a nature preserve in Alachua County, Florida

==== Georgia ====
- Turkey Creek (Indian Creek tributary), a stream in Georgia
- Turkey Creek (Oconee River tributary), a stream in Georgia

==== Iowa ====
- Turkey Creek (Johnson County, Iowa)

==== Kansas ====
- Turkey Creek (Kansas), a tributary of the Kansas River

==== Mississippi ====
- Turkey Creek (Mississippi), a stream in Mississippi

==== Missouri ====
- Turkey Creek (Bonne Femme Creek), a stream in Missouri
- Turkey Creek (Castor River), a stream in Missouri
- Turkey Creek (Cuivre River), a stream in Missouri
- Turkey Creek (Ditch Creek), a stream in Missouri
- Turkey Creek (Elk Fork Salt River), a stream in Missouri
- Turkey Creek (Lake Taneycomo), a stream in Missouri
- Turkey Creek (Little Sac River), a stream in Missouri
- Turkey Creek (Osage River), a stream in Missouri
- Turkey Creek (Spring River), a stream in Kansas and Missouri

==== Nebraska ====
- Turkey Creek (Niobrara River tributary), a stream in Holt County, Nebraska

==== New York ====
- Turkey Creek (New York), a stream in New York

==== North Carolina ====
- Turkey Creek (Roberson Creek tributary), a stream in Chatham County, North Carolina
- Turkey Creek (Crabtree Creek tributary), a stream in Wake County, North Carolina

==== Ohio ====
- Turkey Creek (Ohio River), a stream in Ohio

==== South Dakota ====
- Turkey Creek (South Dakota), a stream in South Dakota

==== Tennessee ====
- Turkey Creek (Hardin County, Tennessee)

==== Texas ====
- Turkey Creek (Nueces River), a tributary of the Nueces River, in Texas
- Turkey Creek (Village Creek Tributary), a stream in Tyler and Hardin Counties, Texas

==== Virginia ====
- Turkey Creek (Stewarts Creek tributary), a stream in Carroll County, Virginia

== Other uses ==
- Turkey Creek, a nature preserve in Pinson, Alabama
- Turkey Creek School, a school in Stone County, Arkansas
- Historic Turkey Creek High School, a high school in Plant City, Florida
- Turkey Creek (Tennessee), a shopping complex in Knox County, Tennessee

== See also ==
- Turkey Creek Township (disambiguation)
