= Emory L. Bennett =

US Army soldier (1929-1951)

Emory Lawrence Bennett
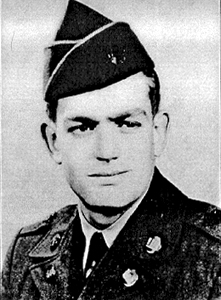
- Medal of Honor recipient
- Born: December 20, 1929; New Smyrna Beach, Florida
- Died: June 24, 1951 (aged 21) near Sobangsan, Korea
- Burial place: Pinecrest Cemetery, Cocoa, Florida
- Military career
- Allegiance: United States of America
- Branch: United States Army
- Service years: 1950–1951
- Rank: Private First Class
- Units: 15th Infantry Regiment, 3rd Infantry Division
- Conflicts: Korean War: UN May–June 1951 counteroffensive (DOW)
- Awards: Medal of Honor; Purple Heart

Emory Lawrence Bennett (December 20, 1929 – June 24, 1951) was a United States Army soldier in the Korean War who posthumously received the U.S. military's highest decoration, the Medal of Honor.

== Biography ==
Bennett was born in New Smyrna Beach, Florida on December 20, 1929. His family moved to Indianola on Merritt Island when he was six and to Cocoa in 1937. His parents ran "Bennett Fish Market", and he helped catch fish in the nearby Indian River to sell. The family supplemented their diet by duck hunting, and Emory proved a crack shot. He had three older brothers: Gary, Marvin and John. Bennett graduated from Cocoa High School in 1948 and enlisted in the Army on July 25, 1950.

Bennett served in Korea as a private first class with Company B of the 1st Battalion, 15th Infantry Regiment, 3rd Infantry Division. In the early morning hours of June 24, 1951, two enemy battalions launched a human wave attack against his company's defensive position near Sobangsan. Bennett left his foxhole and stood exposed to hostile fire in order to attack with his automatic rifle. Although wounded, he maintained this position long enough to momentarily halt the enemy advance and allow Company B to regroup. The assault resumed, however, and the company was forced to pull back. Bennett voluntarily stayed behind to provide covering fire while the rest of the unit withdrew, during which time he was mortally wounded. For these actions, he was posthumously awarded the Medal of Honor six months later, on February 1, 1952.

His body arrived home on November 23, 1951. He is interred at Pinecrest Cemetery in Cocoa, Florida.

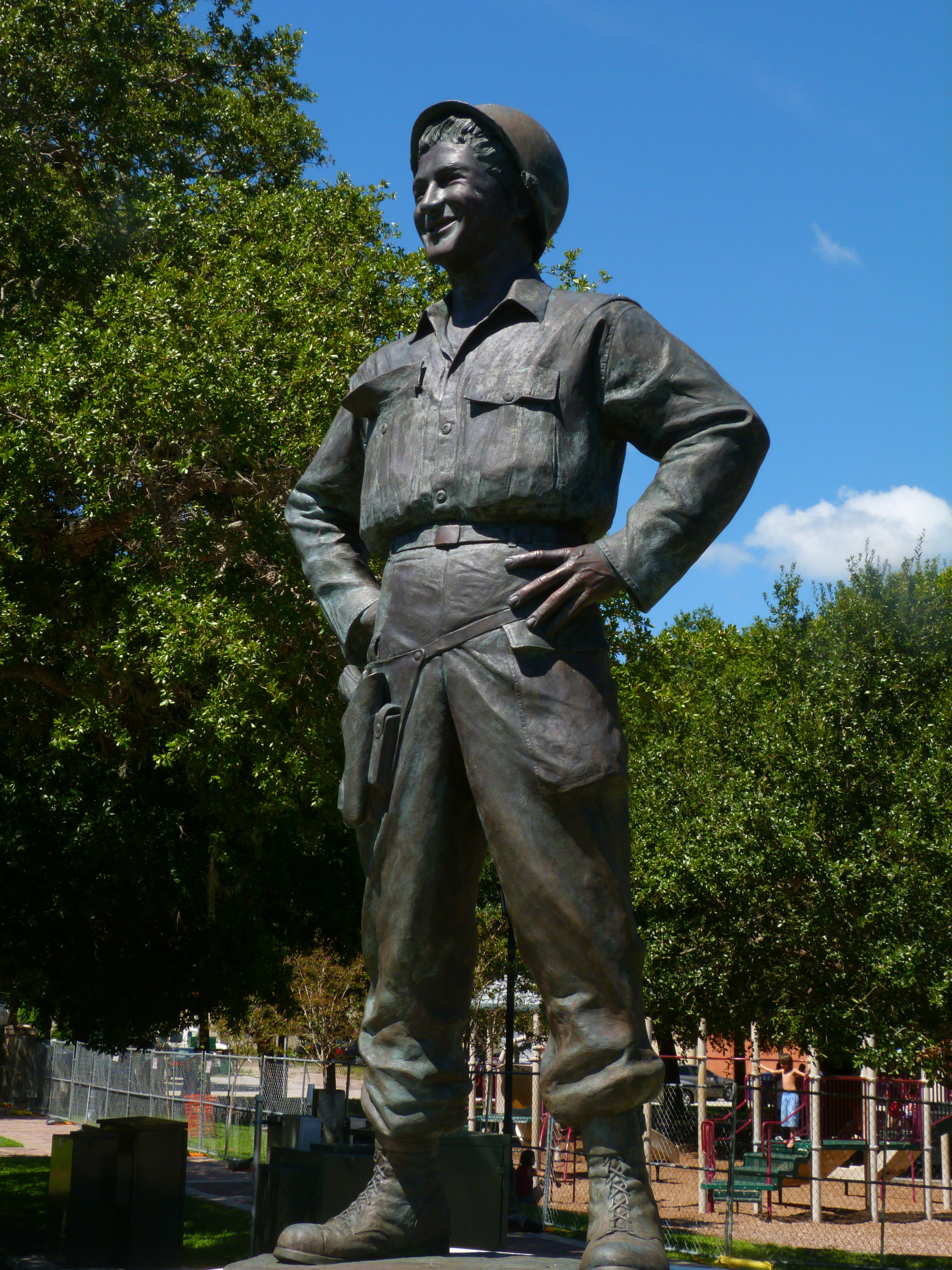
Monument to Bennett in Riverside Park, Cocoa, Florida.

== Medal of Honor citation ==
Bennett's official Medal of Honor citation reads:

PFC Bennett a member of Company B, distinguished himself by conspicuous gallantry and intrepidity at the risk of his life above and beyond the call of duty in action against an armed enemy of the United Nations. At approximately 0200 hours, 2 enemy battalions swarmed up the ridge line in a ferocious banzai charge in an attempt to dislodge PFC Bennett's company from its defensive positions. Meeting the challenge, the gallant defenders delivered destructive retaliation, but the enemy pressed the assault with fanatical determination and the integrity of the perimeter was imperiled. Fully aware of the odds against him, PFC Bennett unhesitatingly left his foxhole, moved through withering fire, stood within full view of the enemy, and, employing his automatic rifle, poured crippling fire into the ranks of the onrushing assailants, inflicting numerous casualties. Although wounded, PFC Bennett gallantly maintained his 1-man defense and the attack was momentarily halted. During this lull in battle, the company regrouped for counterattack, but the numerically superior foe soon infiltrated into the position. Upon orders to move back, PFC Bennett voluntarily remained to provide covering fire for the withdrawing elements, and, defying the enemy, continued to sweep the charging foe with devastating fire until mortally wounded. His willing self-sacrifice and intrepid actions saved the position from being overrun and enabled the company to effect an orderly withdrawal. PFC Bennett's unflinching courage and consummate devotion to duty reflect lasting glory on himself and the military service.

== Awards and decorations ==

Badge	Combat Infantryman Badge		
1st row	Medal of Honor	Purple Heart	National Defense Service Medal
2nd row	Korean Service Medal with 1 Campaign star	United Nations Korea Medal	Korean War Service Medal Retroactively Awarded, 2003
Unit awards	Republic of Korea Presidential Unit Citation		

== See also ==
- Emory L. Bennett Causeway
- List of Korean War Medal of Honor recipients
