= Indianola, Florida =

Unincorporated community in Florida, U.S.

Indianola is a historic unincorporated community on Merritt Island in Brevard County, Florida, United States. It is centered on Indianola Drive, which is about half a mile south of where State Road 528, the Bennett Causeway across the Indian River, enters Merritt Island. It extends north of 528 a short distance to include the Indianola Cemetery near the Barge Canal, and east to State Road 3

== History ==
In 1868, Martha Ann Justice the wife of J.R. Field, named the spot they picked to settle on the east shore of the Indian River, "Indianola." Indianola dates from the latter part of the 19th century and is the home of the Dr. George E. Hill House and the J. R. Field Homestead, both of which are listed on the National Register of Historic Places.

== Cemetery ==
On November 4, 1898, Thomas H. Sanders and his wife Mary donated land to the community of Indianola for a cemetery as long as a group of Trustees was formed to care and manage the property for that purpose. Indianola Pioneer Cemetery (a.k.a. Williams Cemetery and formerly referred to as Evergreen Cemetery) is located next to a marina and bordered on the north by the Barge Canal and the south by State Road 528 in Brevard County, Florida. The cemetery is 4.36 acres and is owned and maintained by PIONEER CEMETERY CORP TRUSTEES. Cemetery address is Marine Harbor Dr., Merritt Island, Brevard County, Florida, 32953 USA; GPS Latitude 28.4059360. Longitude -80.7110010. There are 329 grave sites, the oldest being John Moss Field (1 Sep 1809 – 1 Dec 1891.) A masonry wall with gate was constructed and a bronze plaque mounted to dedicate the wall to David and Sallie Williams and the name "Williams" began to be attached to the cemetery. Coordinates are 28.406105, +30.710401.

== Post Office ==
A U.S. post office was established on January 22, 1889, at Indianola. It closed on May 15, 1926, and the area was transferred to the Cocoa post office.

== Notable residents ==
Emory L. Bennett - medal of honor winner. Lived here briefly as a child
