= Roberson Creek =

Roberson Creek may refer to:

== Streams ==
- Roberson Creek (Chatham County, North Carolina), a tributary to the Haw River
- Roberson Creek (Rutherford County, North Carolina), a tributary to the Second Broad River
- Roberson Creek (Gibson County, Tennessee), a tributary to Rutherford Fork of the Obion River
- Roberson Creek (Lincoln County, Wyoming), a tributary to Dry Muddy Creek

== Churches ==
- Roberson Creek Church (Rutherford County, North Carolina)
