= J. R. Field Homestead =

- Field Manor
- U.S. National Register of Historic Places
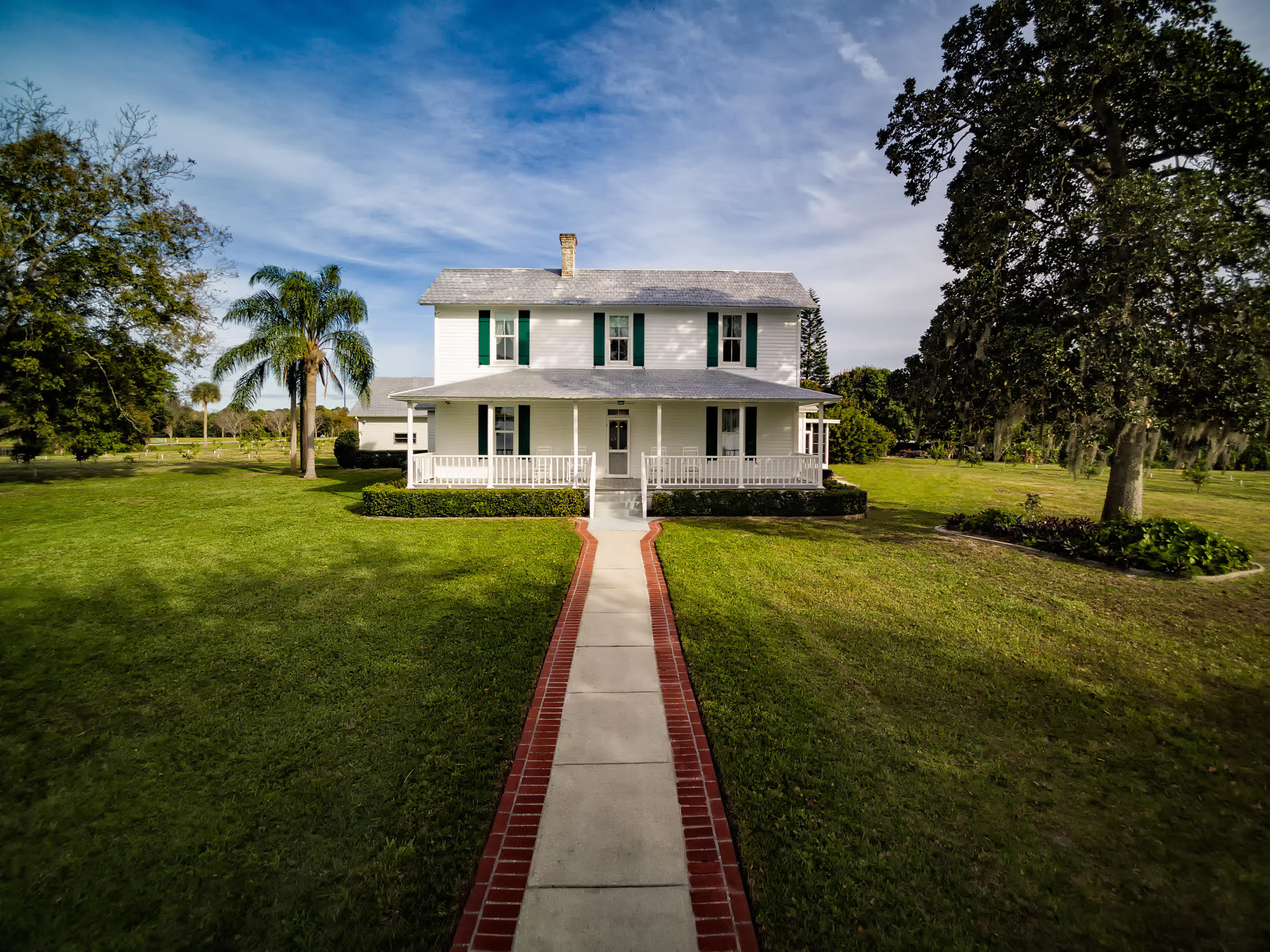
- Field Manor Homestead

- Location within Florida Location within the United States
- Location: Merritt Island, Florida
- Coordinates: 28°23′53″N 80°43′0″W
- Area: 45 acres (18 ha)
- NRHP reference No.: 97001121
- Added to NRHP: September 11, 1997

Field Manor, located at 750 Field Manor Drive in Indianola on Merritt Island, Florida was added to the U.S. National Register of Historic Places on September 11, 1997, as the J.R. Field Homestead. The historic 19th century homestead now serves as a museum and venue. It is one of the oldest standing structures on Merritt Island, dating to the 1880s.

== History ==
John Moss Field first went to Florida in the 1830s during the Second Seminole War. Later, he moved with his wife Eliza and their family to Merritt island from Macon, Georgia in 1868. Within a year, the family returned to Macon, except for John Robert Field and Samuel Joseph Field, two sons of John and Eliza.

In 2013, after the last of the descendants left the home, the property and structure have served as a historic house museum.

The house is roughly 3,500 square feet (330 m^{2}) and is two stories. It is located on a 45-acre property with 300 feet (91 m) of riverfront on the indian River.

== Events ==
Since about 2015, the museum hosted an annual oyster and fish fry every Fall, an event based on a Field family tradition.

== Field Manor Foundation ==
Today, Field Manor is owned by Field Manor Foundation, a private 501(c)3 foundation created by Alma Clyde Field in 1998, the last Field family member to reside in the house. The homestead is open to the public as a historic house museum, having undergone two years of preservation and restoration. Everything in the house is original, from the furniture collection to the beadboard walls. The site also serves as an event venue.
