= Palm Bay =

Palm Bay may refer to:

- Palm Bay, Florida, a city in Florida, United States
- Palm Bay (Florida), a bay in Florida, United States
- Palm Bay, Kent, a bay in Cliftonville, England
