= Haulover Canal =

Historic canal in Florida, US

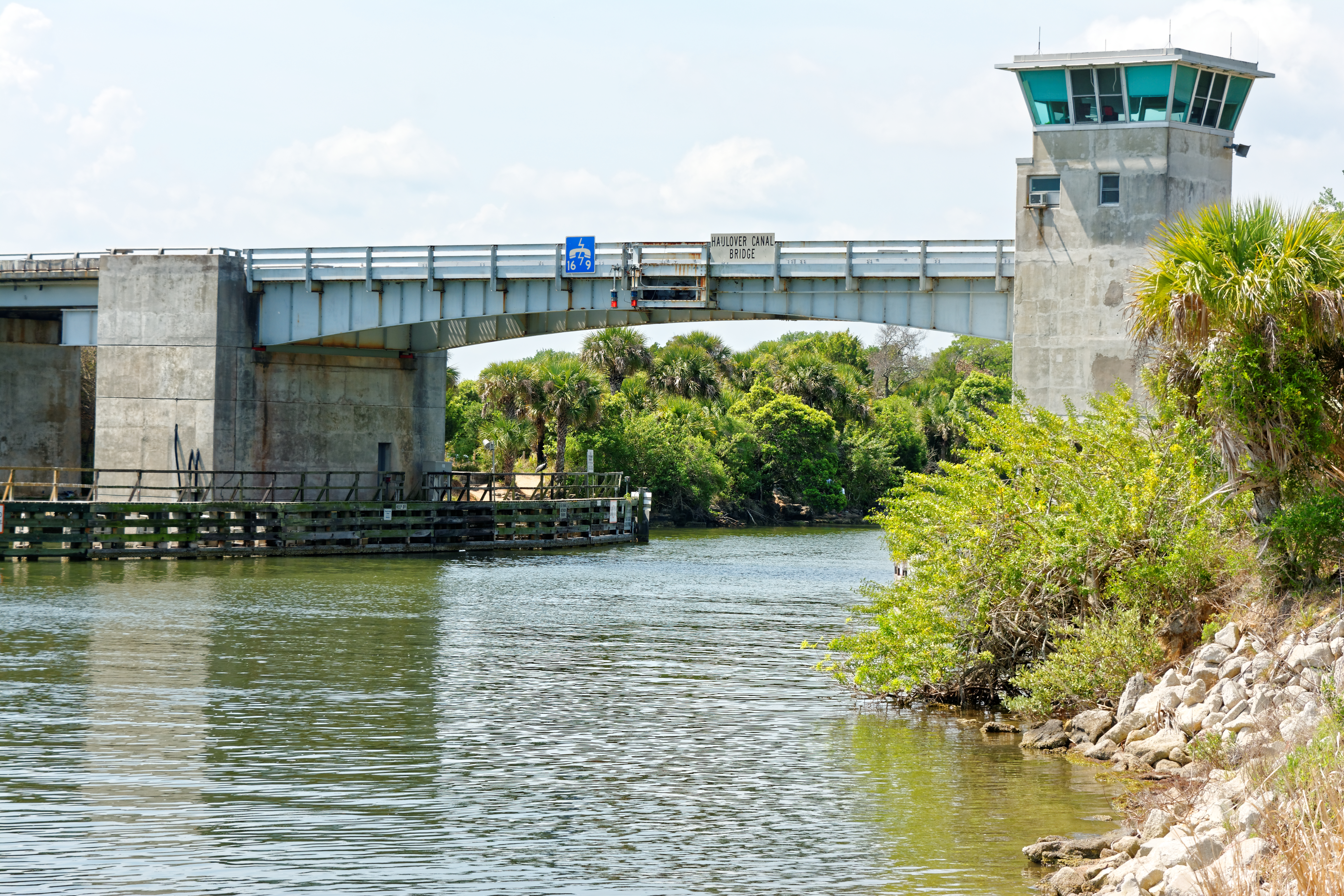
- Haulover Canal Bridge

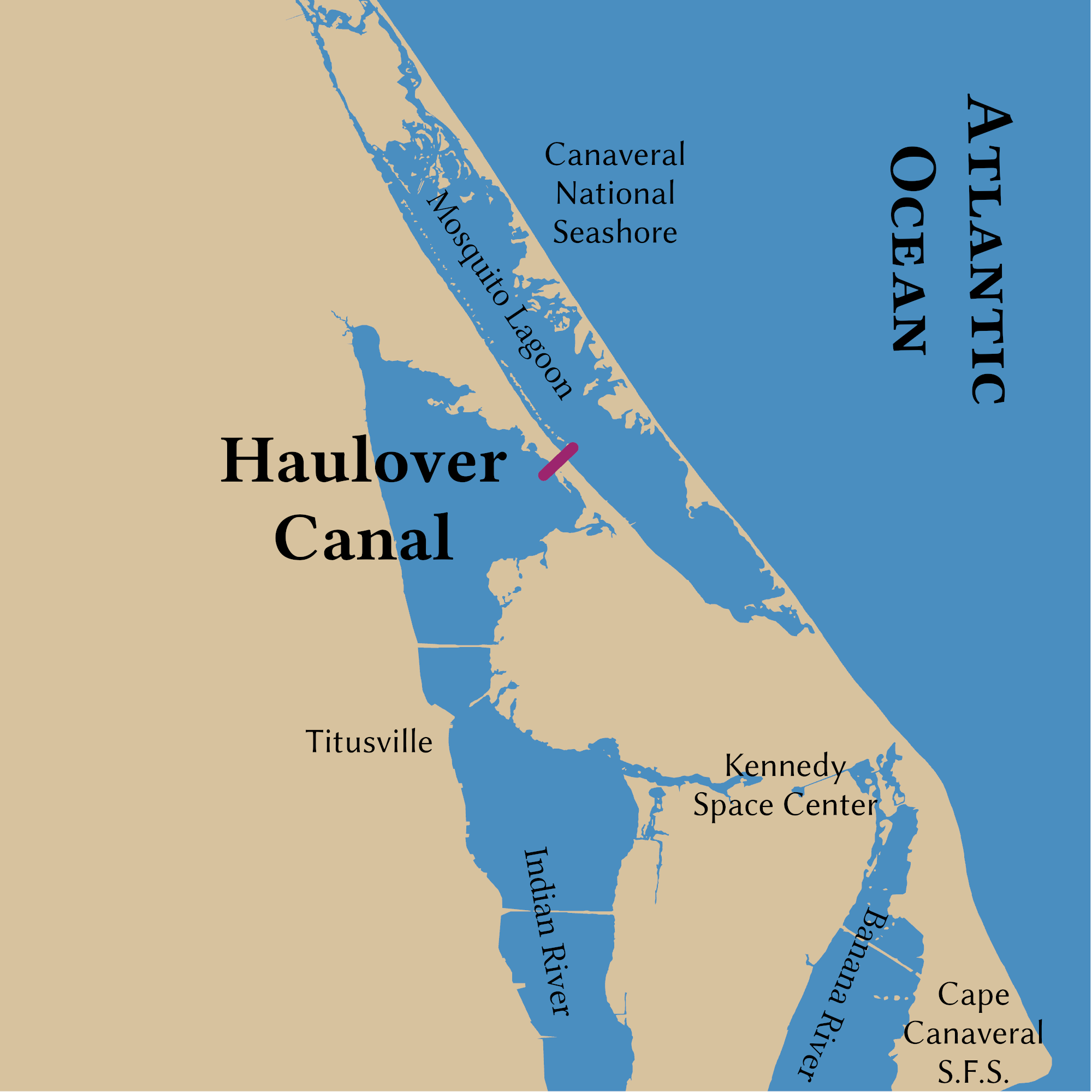
- Location: Brevard County, Florida
- Country: United States

Specifications
- Locks: None
- Status: Open
- Navigation authority: U.S. Army Corps of Engineers

History
- Date completed: 1887

Geography
- Start point: Mosquito Lagoon
- End point: Indian River

The Haulover Canal is a waterway north of Merritt Island, Florida, near the former site of Allenhurst, that connects Mosquito Lagoon with the Indian River, and is part of the Intracoastal Waterway.

In the early 1960s there were plans to relocate the canal further north, near the junction of US 1 and Courtenay Parkway, but by 1964 when the new Haulover Canal Bridge was constructed these plans had been shelved.

== Crossings ==
Crossing	Carries	Image	Location	Coordinates
Haulover Canal Bridge (drawbridge)	SR 3 Courtenay Parkway		Allenhurst	28°44′11″N 80°45′17″W

== Old Haulover Canal ==
- Old Haulover Canal
- U.S. National Register of Historic Places
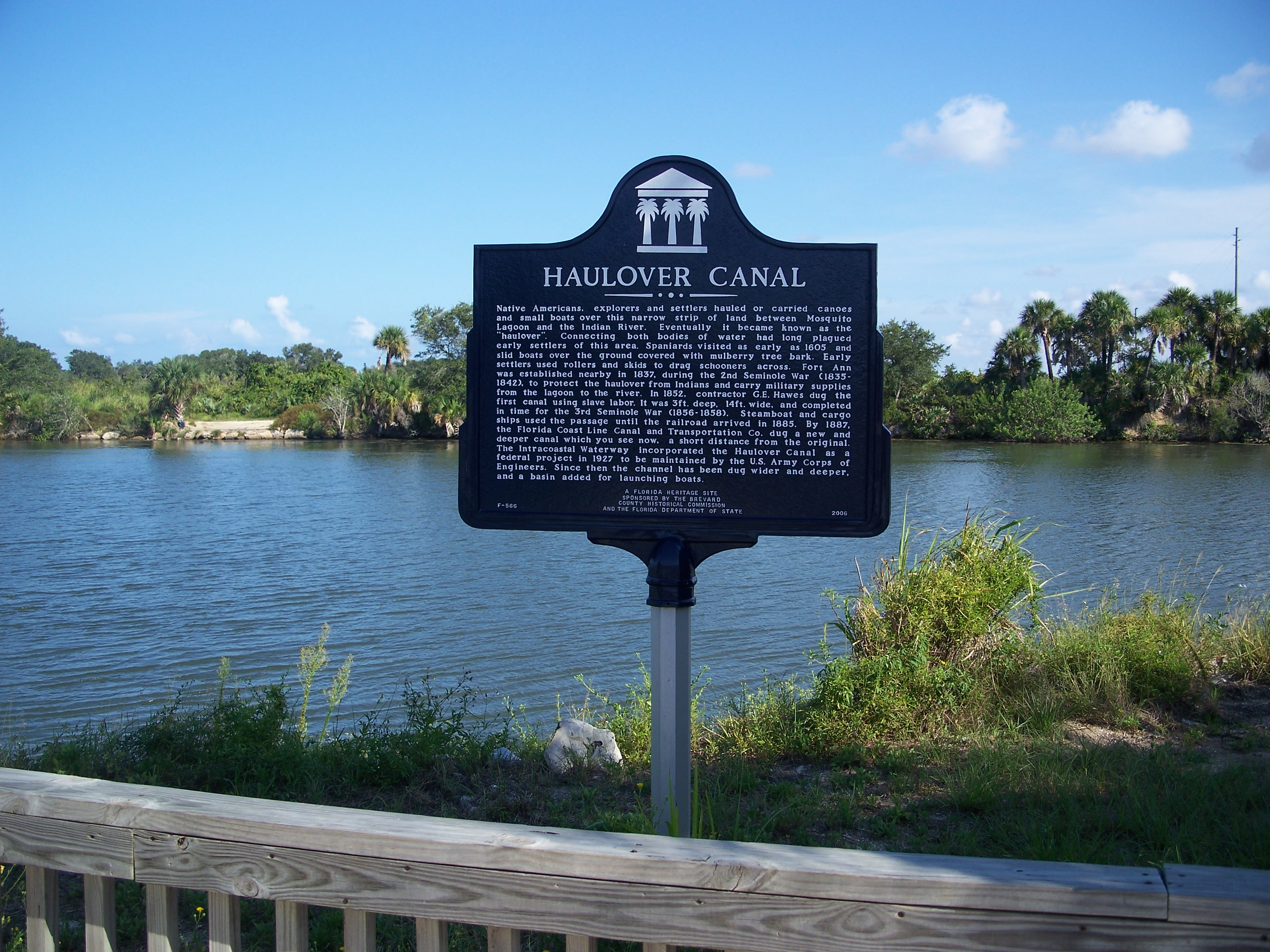
- Historic marker, with canal in background

- Location within Florida Location within the United States
- Location: Brevard County, Florida
- Nearest city: Merritt Island
- Coordinates: 28°44′11″N 80°45′17″W
- NRHP reference No.: 78000262
- Added to NRHP: December 19, 1978

The Old Haulover Canal is a historic location north of Merritt Island, Florida. On December 19, 1978, it was added to the United States National Register of Historic Places.

According to the state historical marker near the site:

Native Americans, explorers and settlers hauled or carried canoes and small boats over this narrow strip of land between Mosquito Lagoon and the Indian River. Eventually it became known as the "haulover." Connecting both bodies of water had long challenged early settlers of this area. Spaniards visited as early as 1605 and slid boats over the ground covered with mulberry tree bark. Early settlers used rollers and skids to drag schooners across. Fort Ann was established nearby in 1837, during the 2nd Seminole War (1835–1842), to protect the haulover from Indians and carry military supplies from the lagoon to the river. In 1852, contractor G.E. Hawes dug the first canal using slave labor. It was 3 feet (0.91 m) deep, 14 feet (4.3 m) wide, and completed in time for the 3rd Seminole War (1856–1858). Steamboat and cargo ships used the passage until the railroad arrived in 1885. By 1887, the Florida Coast Line Canal and Transportation Company dug a new and deeper canal which you see now, a short distance from the original. The Intracoastal Waterway incorporated the Haulover Canal as a federal project in 1927 to be maintained by the U.S. Army Corps of Engineers. Since then the channel has been dug wider and deeper, and a basin added for launching boats.
