= Merritt Island Dragon =

Dragon-shaped green concrete structure

Coordinates: 28°08′31.97″N 80°36′13.60″W

- Artist: Lewis VanDercar
- Year: 1971
- Type: Concrete sculpture
- Location: Merritt Island, Florida

The Merritt Island Dragon or Merrit Island River Dragon was a dragon-shaped green concrete structure that stood at the southern tip of Merritt Island, Florida, known as Dragon Point, where the Indian River Lagoon splits to form the Banana River Lagoon. The dragon was built in 1971 by Florida artist Lewis VanDercar and property owner Aynn Christal. In 1981, the statue was expanded for new property owner Warren McFadden, with the addition of a tail, an extended neck, two cavepeople - a caveman named Fred and a cavewoman named Wilma, and four hatchling dragons named Joy, Sunshine, Charity, and Freedom. The statues were located between the cities of Melbourne and Indian Harbour Beach, Florida, north of the Eau Gallie Causeway.

The dragon was created from 20 short tons (18 t) of concrete and steel, and stood 35 feet (11 m) high and 65 feet (20 m) long. Known as "Annie", the dragon served as a landmark for both locals and boaters, and also as a playhouse for children. On special occasions, the dragon would breathe fire. The idea for the sculpture was inspired by the American Indian legend which held that seeing a dragon rising from the mist where the Banana and Indian Rivers met was a sign of good fortune.

In August 2002, the sculpture was badly damaged, and partially collapsed into the water during a storm; vandalism was blamed for contributing to the destruction of the statue.

== Restoration ==
The owner and the Brevard County Commissioners were unable to agree on a rehabilitation effort; there was a plan in 2004 to reconstruct the sculpture, while in 2008, a developer planned a luxury hotel and spa on the Dragon Point site with a reconstructed dragon statue as its centerpiece, but both plans fell through.

Save Dragon Point, an organization dedicated to rebuilding the dragon statue, was founded in May 2012. In August, the mansion on the property where the dragon had stood was scheduled to be demolished and the property sold. Save Dragon Point changed its name to Annie and Kids Arts and Education Foundation.

In January 2015, Don Facciobene, local builder and developer, bought the property; he announced that a new dragon named "Rojak" would be built. According to the story of Dragon Point, Rojak was Annie's fifth hatchling who was kept hidden. An inaugural Dragon Boat Festival was planned for June 13, 2015, with proceeds intended to benefit Save Dragon Point.

In April 2015, a plan was announced to build Rojak by 2018. Demolition work began at Dragon Point in March of 2017, clearing room for a future multi-million dollar riverfront mansion and Rojak; however neither the mansion nor Rojak was built, and the site remained vacant. On December 27, 2025, the 0.86-acre property at 11680 Point Drive was relisted for sale at $4.5 million; build-to-suit options of $7 million (mansion only) and $8 million (mansion plus a new dragon sculpture of the buyer's choosing) were also offered. The southern tip of Merritt Island continues to be labeled "Dragon Point" on National Oceanic and Atmospheric Administration navigational charts.

== In popular culture ==
A children's book about the dragon, River Dragon: A Real Florida Fairy Tale, was published in 2003.
