= Dr. George E. Hill House =

- U.S. National Register of Historic Places
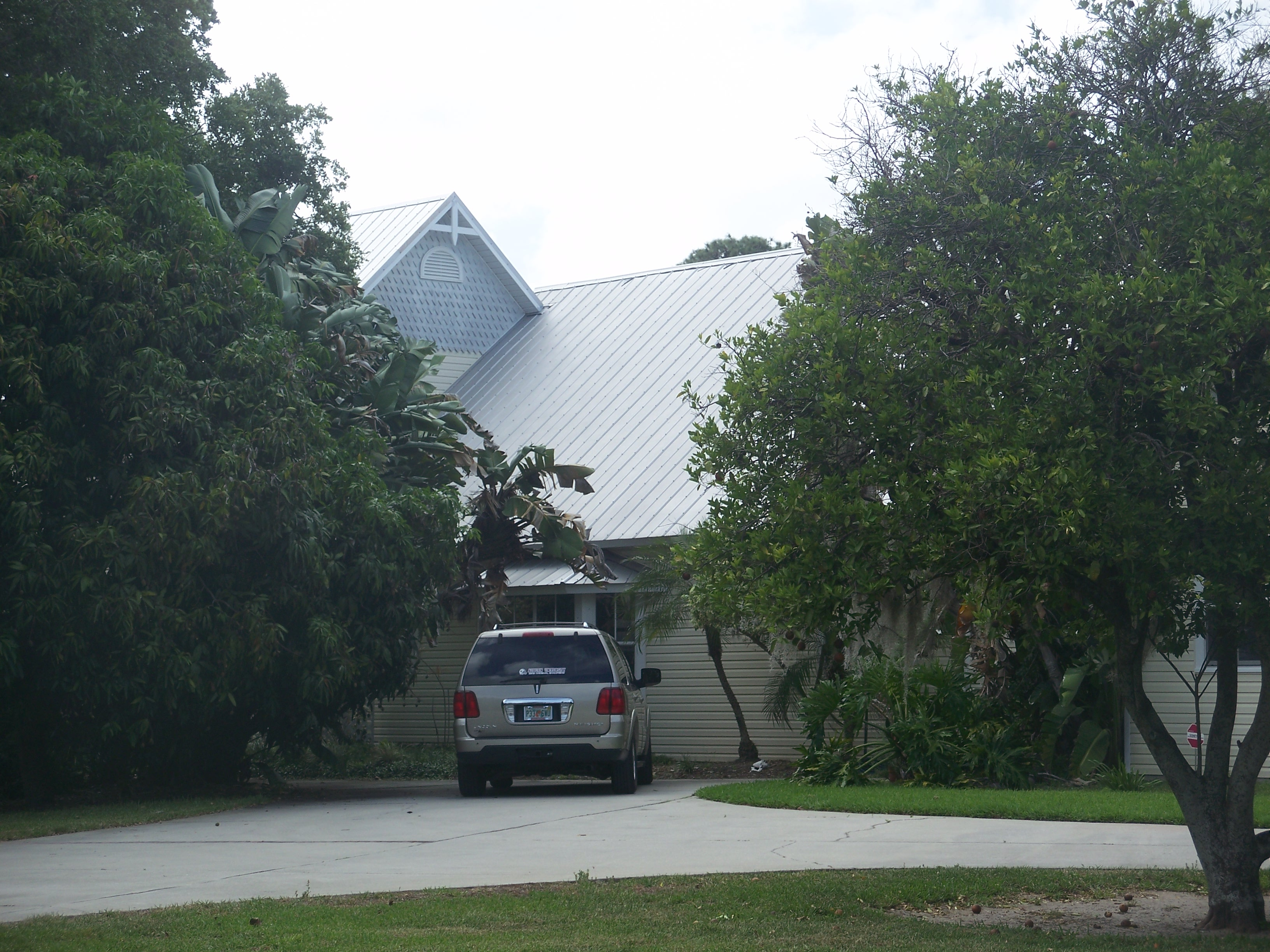

- Location within Florida Location within the United States
- Location: Merritt Island, Florida
- Coordinates: 28°23′45″N 80°43′9″W
- NRHP reference No.: 93000819
- Added to NRHP: March 3, 1994

The Dr. George E. Hill House is an historic house located at 870 Indianola Drive in Indianola on Merritt Island, Florida. On March 3, 1994, it was added to the U.S. National Register of Historic Places.
