= Merritt Island Airport =

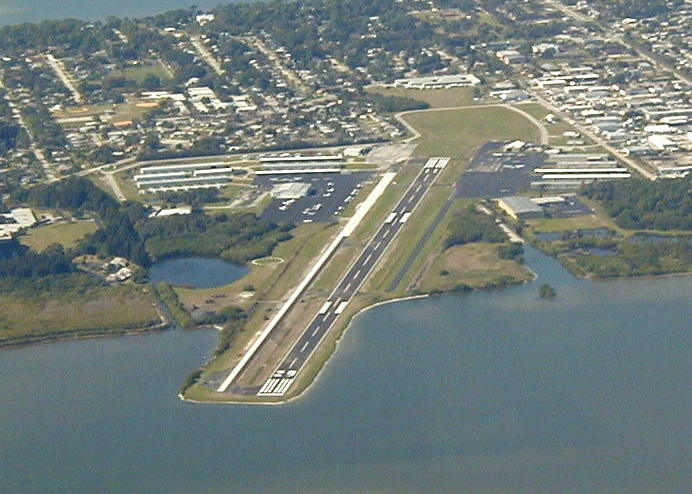
- IATA: COI; ICAO: KCOI; FAA LID: COI

Summary
- Airport type: Public
- Owner: Titusville-Cocoa Airport Authority
- Location: 900 Airport Road; Merritt Island, Florida
- Elevation AMSL: 5.9 ft / 1.8 m
- Coordinates: 28°20′30″N 080°41′08″W
- Interactive map of Merritt Island Airport

Runways
| Direction | Length | | Surface |
| Direction | ft | m | Surface |
|---|---|---|---|
| 11/29 | 3,601 | 1,098 | Asphalt |

Merritt Island Airport (IATA: COI, ICAO: KCOI, FAA LID: COI) is a general aviation public airport under the administration of the Titusville-Cocoa Airport Authority. It located in Merritt Island, Brevard County, Florida, United States, northwest of Patrick Space Force Base.

== History ==
In the early 1940s, the Brevard County Mosquito Control District constructed the Central Brevard Airport. The airfield included two sod landing strips: a north–south strip measuring approximately 1,800 feet (550 m) in length, and a northwest–southeast strip measuring approximately 3,000 feet (910 m) in length.

An operations building and maintenance hangar were located on the south side of the airfield and the Mosquito Control District had a maintenance hangar on the north side of the airfield. The north–south landing strip was eventually abandoned, replaced by various facilities such as T-hangars that currently occupy this area.

In 1966, the Brevard County Mosquito Control District deeded the Central Brevard Airport property over to the Titusville-Cocoa Airport Authority in exchange for ten acres of land located within Space Coast Regional Airport. Central Brevard Airport was renamed Merritt Island Airport and became a public general aviation facility some time after initial construction took place in 1970 and facilities were completed in 1974.

== Facilities ==
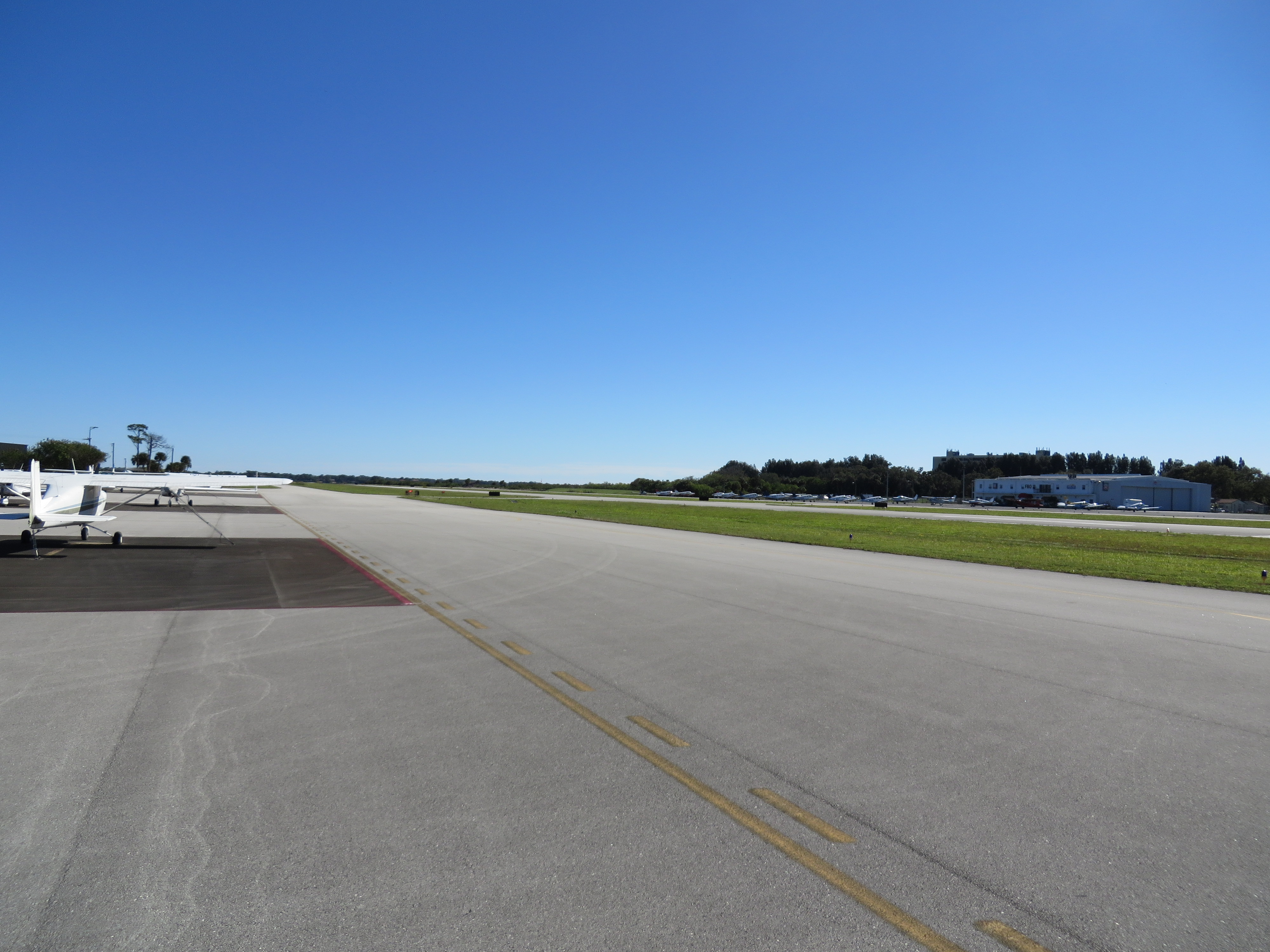
Merritt Island Airport taxiway on the left with runway 11 on the right

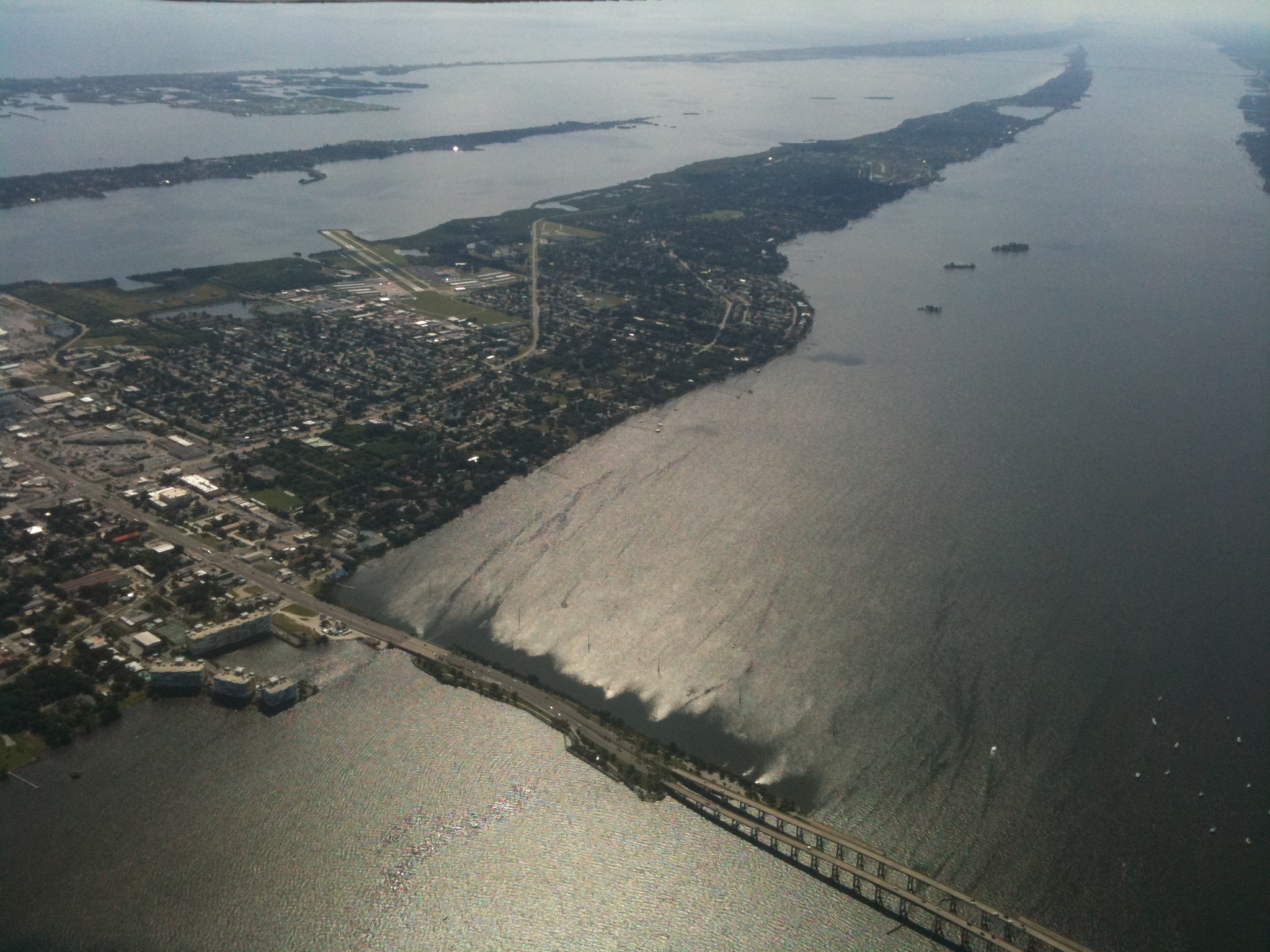
Merritt Island Airport in relation to the rest of Merritt Island

Merritt Island Airport covers 129 acres (52 ha) and has one runway:

- Runway 11/29: 3,601 ft × 75 ft (1,098 m × 23 m), surface: asphalt

=== Government activities ===
- Brevard County Sheriff's Office Aviation Unit

=== Businesses ===
- Space Coast Aviation - Merritt Island's FBO
- 2FLY Airborne - international pilot training
- Buzz Airlines - aircraft charters; has a base at the airport
- Voyager Aviation International - flight training
- Sebastian Communication Inc. - avionics sales, installation and repairs

== Accidents and incidents ==
On January 24, 2021, 24-year-old Abhishek Patter, a pilot from India who was training for his commercial airline pilot's license, crashed a Piper PA-28 airplane on nearby waters while flying from Palm Beach County Park Airport to Merritt Island Airport. The 24-year-old was a student at 2Fly Airborne flight school in Merritt Island according to officials in Brevard County. His body was found later by rescuers. He was the sole occupant of the aircraft when it crashed.

== See also ==
- List of airports in Florida
