= Merritt Island, Florida =

Census-designated place in Florida, United States

- Census-designated place
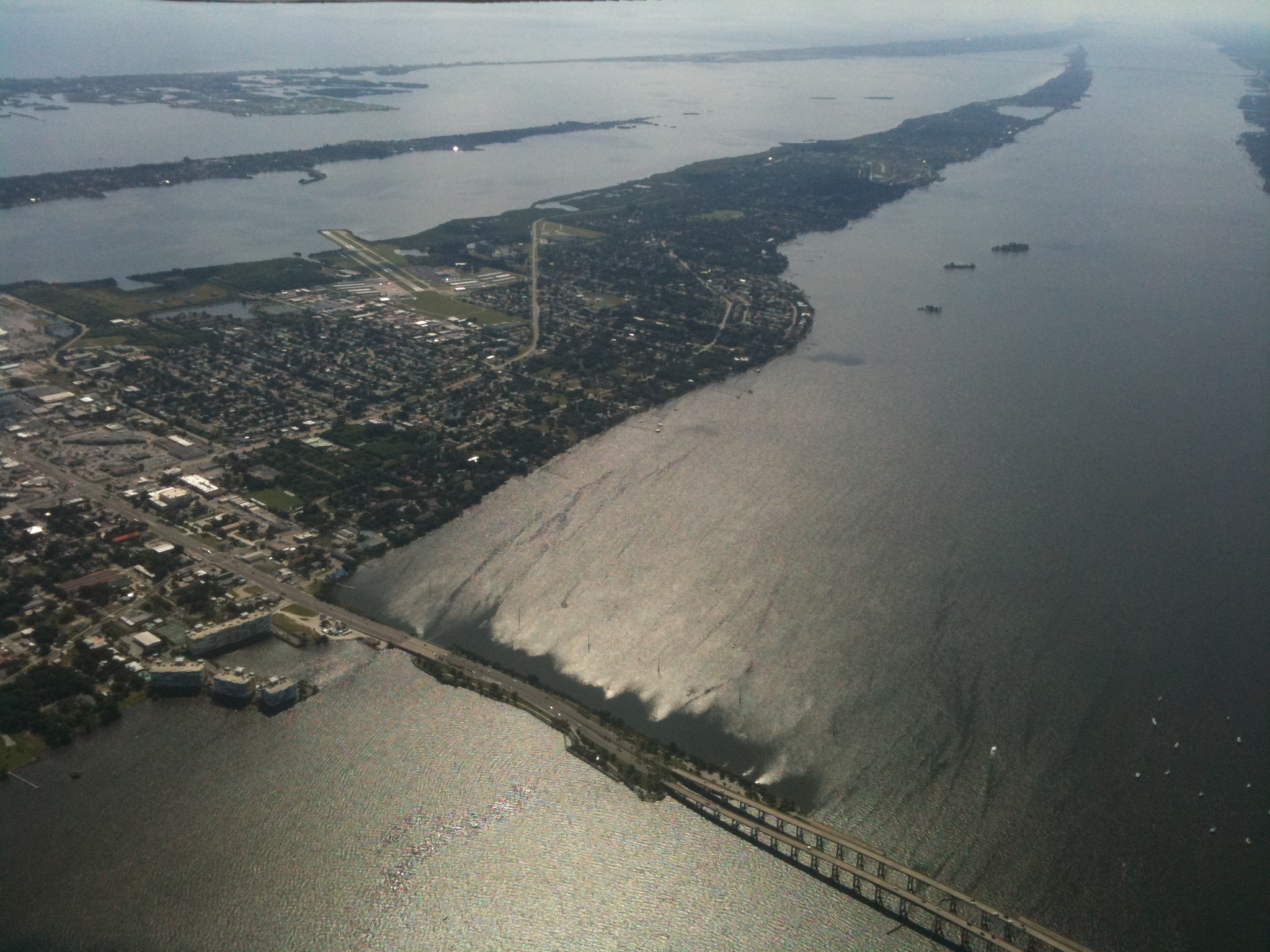

- Location in Brevard County and the state of Florida
- Coordinates: 28°18′45″N 80°38′50″W
- Country: United States
- State: Florida
- County: Brevard

Area
  - Total: 46.15 sq mi (119.54 km^{2})
  - Land: 16.97 sq mi (43.96 km^{2})
  - Water: 29.19 sq mi (75.59 km^{2})
- Elevation: 0 ft (0 m)

Population (2020)
  - Total: 34,518
  - Density: 2,034/sq mi (785.3/km^{2})
- Time zone: UTC-5 (Eastern (EST))
  - Summer (DST): UTC-4 (EDT)
- ZIP Codes: 32952–32954
- Area code: 321
- FIPS code: 12-44275
- GNIS feature ID: 2403280

Merritt Island is a peninsula in Brevard County, Florida, United States, located on the eastern Florida coast, along the Atlantic Ocean. It is also the name of an unincorporated town in the central and southern parts of the island and a census-designated place (CDP).

The population was 34,518 at the 2020 census, down from 34,743 at the 2010 census. It is part of the Palm Bay–Melbourne–Titusville, Florida Metropolitan Statistical Area.

NASA's John F. Kennedy Space Center is located on Merritt Island to the north of the town, and Merritt Island National Wildlife Refuge is located north of the space center.

The central part of Merritt Island, previously known as Merritt City, is home to the majority of the population and includes the local high school, library, and shopping district. The southern area is heavily residential, with centralized light commercial and light industrial areas.

== History ==
=== Etymology ===
Merritt Island owes its name to the King of Spain. The entire island was part of a land grant given by the King to a nobleman named Merritt.

=== Prehistory ===
Paleontological excavations in the area have unearthed the remains of numerous megafauna and other extinct species, including many herbivorous ungulates, artiodactyls (camelids, peccaries), perissodactyls (equids, tapirs), proboscideans (mammoths, mastodons), rodents (beaver, capybara, porcupine), tortoises and xenarthrans (armadillos, glyptodonts). These species, and many more, thrived in the region up to approx. 11,000 years ago, when a larger North-American extinction event caused the majority of native megafauna to die out; this was possibly due to climate change caused by the advancing and/or retreating of the glacial maximum, thus affecting natural resources and weather conditions. Later, more pressures on wildlife would have come from the arrival of the Clovis culture, who became prolific hunters with their distinct, fluted stone weaponry—including some of the earliest spears and arrowheads. Biochemical analyses have shown, for example, that Clovis tools were used in the hunting of camelids. The Pleistocene, or Quaternary, megafaunal extinction also coincided, roughly, with the appearance of the Clovis culture.

By between 800–900 BC, permanent Native American structures were erected in the area. Their mounds populated the lagoon margin.

=== Post-Columbian ===
In 1605, Spanish explorer Álvaro Mexía visited the local tribes living in the Indian River area. He interacted with the local tribe of Ais people, part of the native province of Ulumay. Merritt Island is the prominent island on a color map he drew of the area, a copy of which is in the archives at the Library of Congress and the archives in Seville, Spain. Within a few years, all but a handful of these natives were dead from an epidemic that plagued the area after a British merchant ship ran aground.

In the 1760s, the Elliott Plantation grew and processed sugar cane. Remains of the plantation can be found in the Wildlife Refuge. In April 1788, French botanist André Michaux traveled to Merritt Island, near Cape Canaveral, and spent five days looking at the local plants. He wrote a letter on April 24, 1788, from St Augustine. He reported discovering the flag or bigflower paw-paw, Asimina obovata (Annona grandiflora Bartr.).

In 1837, Fort Ann was constructed on the east coast of Merritt Island, near present-day Haulover Canal, to protect the area against the local Seminoles. Merritt Island's recent history dates back to the mid-19th century, and centers on the growth of citrus, with an emphasis on the cultivation of oranges as well as pineapples. The Indian River oranges and grapefruit come from this sandy area. Freezes temporarily destroyed the local pineapple industry in the late 1890s. Freed slaves constructed small towns in the area after the Civil War, including Haulover, Clifton, and Shiloh.

The island's population grew in the 1950s and 1960s as the Space Race began and nearby NASA expanded. Construction of a barge canal to the Intracoastal Waterway from the Atlantic Ocean (for power plant oil shipments) cut off the northern half of the island for many years. To this day, the northern portion of the island remains slightly less developed, with a few areas remaining as cattle pasture or citrus land. The small towns on the island vanished with the coming of the Space Age, and now only live on in the names of streets and historic churches. In 1988, citizens defeated a proposed incorporation into a city, 77% opposed to 23% in favor.

Sea Ray Boats operated a factory on Merritt Island from 1978 to 2012. At one time it employed 1200 people. It closed the plant in 2013.

== Geography ==
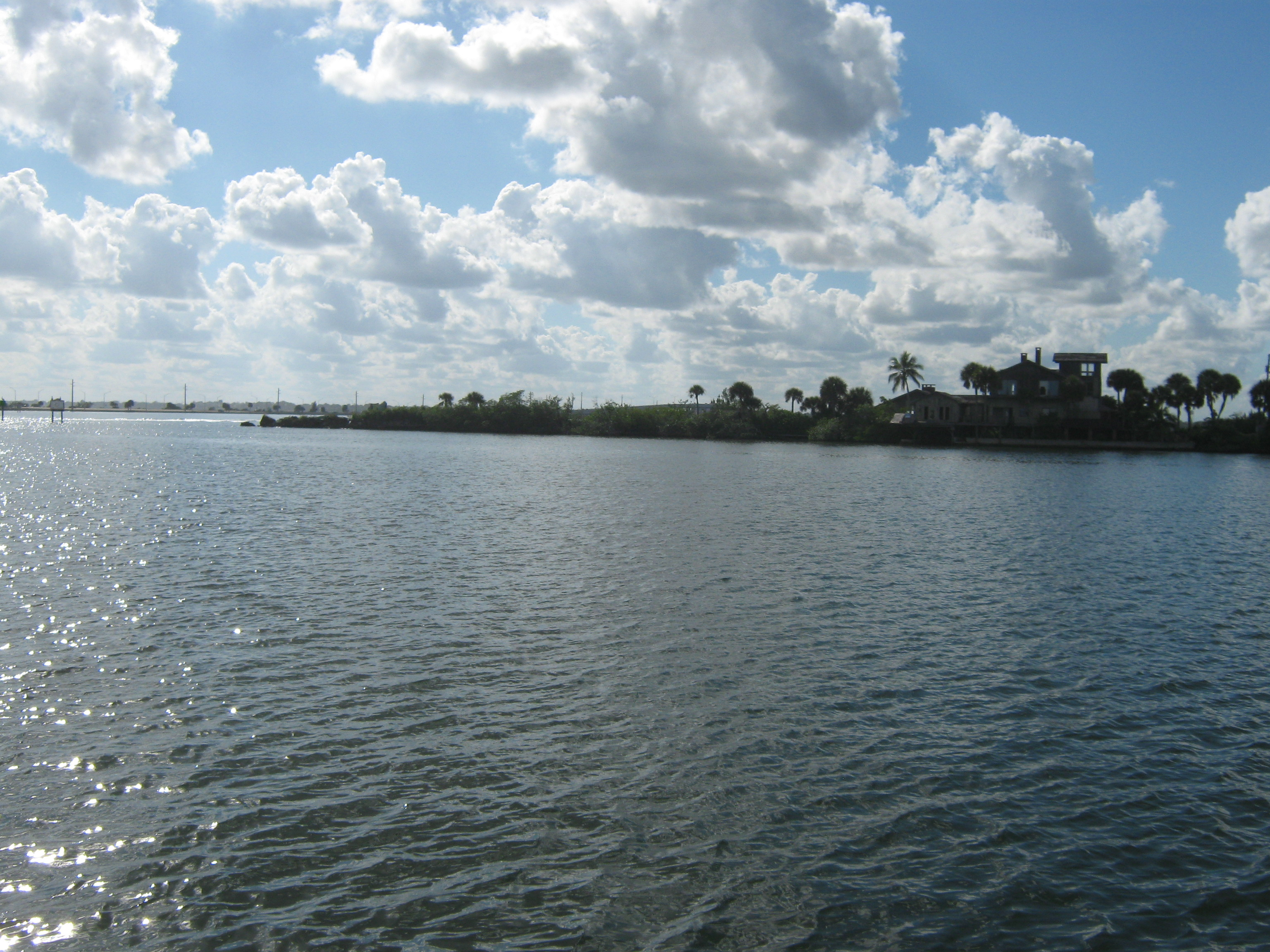
South end of Merritt Island

Merritt Island extends some 46 mi (74 km) from the Volusia County line to Dragon Point near Melbourne. It connects to the Florida mainland where SR 3 now intersects US 1 in Volusia County. To the west it is separated from the mainland by the Indian River and the Atlantic Intracoastal Waterway. To the east it is separated by the Mosquito Lagoon and the Banana River from the barrier island on which Cape Canaveral and Cocoa Beach stand. The east side of Merritt Island splits and is divided by Sykes Creek and Newfound Harbor.

In the north, the Haulover Canal, first dug in the 19th century, separates the island from the mainland. To the west, the island is connected by causeways to mainland Brevard County near Titusville and Cocoa on its northern end, and in Melbourne on its southern end. To the east the island is connected to Cape Canaveral by the Crawlerway, and by causeways to Cocoa Beach and Satellite Beach.

According to the United States Census Bureau, the CDP has a total area of 122.2 km^{2} (47.2 sq mi), of which 45.4 km^{2} (17.5 sq mi) is land and 76.8 km^{2} (29.7 sq mi), or 62.88%, is water.

=== Fauna ===
To the north, Merritt Island National Wildlife Refuge, along with a narrow barrier island that make up Canaveral National Seashore, offer an unpopulated protected buffer area for rocket launches at Kennedy Space Center. There are about 356 species of birds on the peninsula, one of the most diverse in the country. Migratory birds join the more resident wildlife, including alligators, manatees, dolphins, sea turtles, bald eagles, ospreys, bobcats, and the elusive Florida panther. A number of bald eagle nests are monitored atop power line poles along SR 3 within Kennedy Space Center.

There are about 12,000 feral pigs in North Merritt Island. Licensed trappers catch about 2,000 annually, which maintains a stable population. The United States Fish and Wildlife Service would like to reduce the population.

=== Places on Merritt Island ===
Merritt Island has or had 23 named communities, all unincorporated, including:

- Allenhurst
- Angel City
- Audubon
- Banyan
- Courtenay
- Fairyland
- Georgiana
- Heath
- Indianola
- Lotus, Florida
- Orsino
- Shiloh
- Tropic
- Wilson

== Demographics ==
Historical population
| Census | Pop. | Note | %± |
|---|---|---|---|
| 1990 | 32,886 | | — |
| 2000 | 36,090 | | 9.7% |
| 2010 | 34,743 | | −3.7% |
| 2020 | 34,518 | | −0.6% |
U.S. Decennial Census

=== Racial and ethnic composition ===
Merritt Island racial composition (Hispanics excluded from racial categories) (NH = Non-Hispanic)
| Race | Pop 2010 | Pop 2020 | % 2010 | % 2020 |
|---|---|---|---|---|
| White (NH) | 29,241 | 27,770 | 84.16% | 80.45% |
| Black or African American (NH) | 1625 | 846 | 4.68% | 2.45% |
| Native American or Alaska Native (NH) | 137 | 115 | 0.39% | 0.33% |
| Asian (NH) | 772 | 1,029 | 2.22% | 2.98% |
| Pacific Islander or Native Hawaiian (NH) | 37 | 72 | 0.11% | 0.21% |
| Some other race (NH) | 63 | 126 | 0.18% | 0.37% |
| Two or more races/Multiracial (NH) | 739 | 1,772 | 2.13% | 5.13% |
| Hispanic or Latino (any race) | 2,129 | 2,788 | 6.13% | 8.08% |
| Total | 34,743 | 34,518 | 100.00% | 100.00% |

=== 2020 census ===
As of the 2020 census, Merritt Island had a population of 34,518. The median age was 52.2 years. 16.3% of residents were under the age of 18 and 26.1% of residents were 65 years of age or older. For every 100 females there were 97.2 males, and for every 100 females age 18 and over there were 95.5 males age 18 and over.

99.9% of residents lived in urban areas, while 0.1% lived in rural areas.

There were 15,030 households in Merritt Island, of which 21.0% had children under the age of 18 living in them. Of all households, 48.3% were married-couple households, 19.0% were households with a male householder and no spouse or partner present, and 26.0% were households with a female householder and no spouse or partner present. About 29.5% of all households were made up of individuals and 15.2% had someone living alone who was 65 years of age or older.

There were 16,439 housing units, of which 8.6% were vacant. The homeowner vacancy rate was 2.2% and the rental vacancy rate was 6.9%.

Racial composition as of the 2020 census
| Race | Number | Percent |
|---|---|---|
| White | 28,570 | 82.8% |
| Black or African American | 877 | 2.5% |
| American Indian and Alaska Native | 133 | 0.4% |
| Asian | 1,045 | 3.0% |
| Native Hawaiian and Other Pacific Islander | 76 | 0.2% |
| Some other race | 555 | 1.6% |
| Two or more races | 3,262 | 9.5% |
| Hispanic or Latino (of any race) | 2,788 | 8.1% |

=== 2010 census ===
As of the 2010 United States census, there were 34,743 people, 14,247 households, and 9,385 families residing in the CDP.

=== 2000 census ===
As of the census of 2000, there were 36,090 people, 14,955 households, and 10,049 families residing in the CDP. The population density was 2,044.6 inhabitants per square mile (789.4/km^{2}). There were 15,813 housing units at an average density of 895.9 per square mile (345.9/km^{2}). The racial makeup of the CDP was 90.22% White, 5.31% African American, 0.41% Native American, 1.65% Asian, 0.06% Pacific Islander, 0.68% from other races, and 1.66% from two or more races. Hispanic or Latino of any race were 3.83% of the population.

In 2000, there were 14,955 households, out of which 27.1% had children under the age of 18, 52.9% were married couples living together, 10.7% had a female householder with no husband, and 32.8% were non-families. Of households, 26.8% were solely individuals and 11.4% had a lone resident of 65 or older. The average household size was 2.36 and the average family size was 2.86.

In 2000, in the CDP, the population was spread out, with 21.8% under the age of 18, 6.1% from 18 to 24, 26.1% from 25 to 44, 26.2% from 45 to 64, and 19.8% of 65 or older. The median age was 43 years. For every 100 females, there were 95.3 males. For every 100 females age 18 and over, there were 92.3 males.

== Government ==
Merritt Island is under the administrative care of the local county government, with water being handled by the neighboring city of Cocoa. The county maintains operations for the sheriff's office, fire department, emergency medical services, and sewage systems.

== Economy ==
=== Personal income ===
According to the 2000 Census:

- Median household income = $43,532
- Median family income = $52,388
- Median income for males = $41,393
- Median income for females = $25,787
- Per capita income = $23,961
- Below the poverty line:
  - Families = 7.2%
  - Population = 9.4%
  - Those under age 18 = 13.8%
  - Those over age 64 = 7.0%

=== Industry ===
There are light industrial fabrication centers on the Merritt Island Airport, and NASA-related industrial activities to support the Space Shuttle, which was retired in summer of 2011, and other rocket launches on Cape Canaveral Space Force Station.

Air Liquide operates a plant there. Arnott Air Suspension Products, develops and sells aftermarket automotive air suspension products, is also headquartered in Merritt Island.

=== Redevelopment ===
Merritt Island has a redevelopment agency funded by the county.

== Education ==
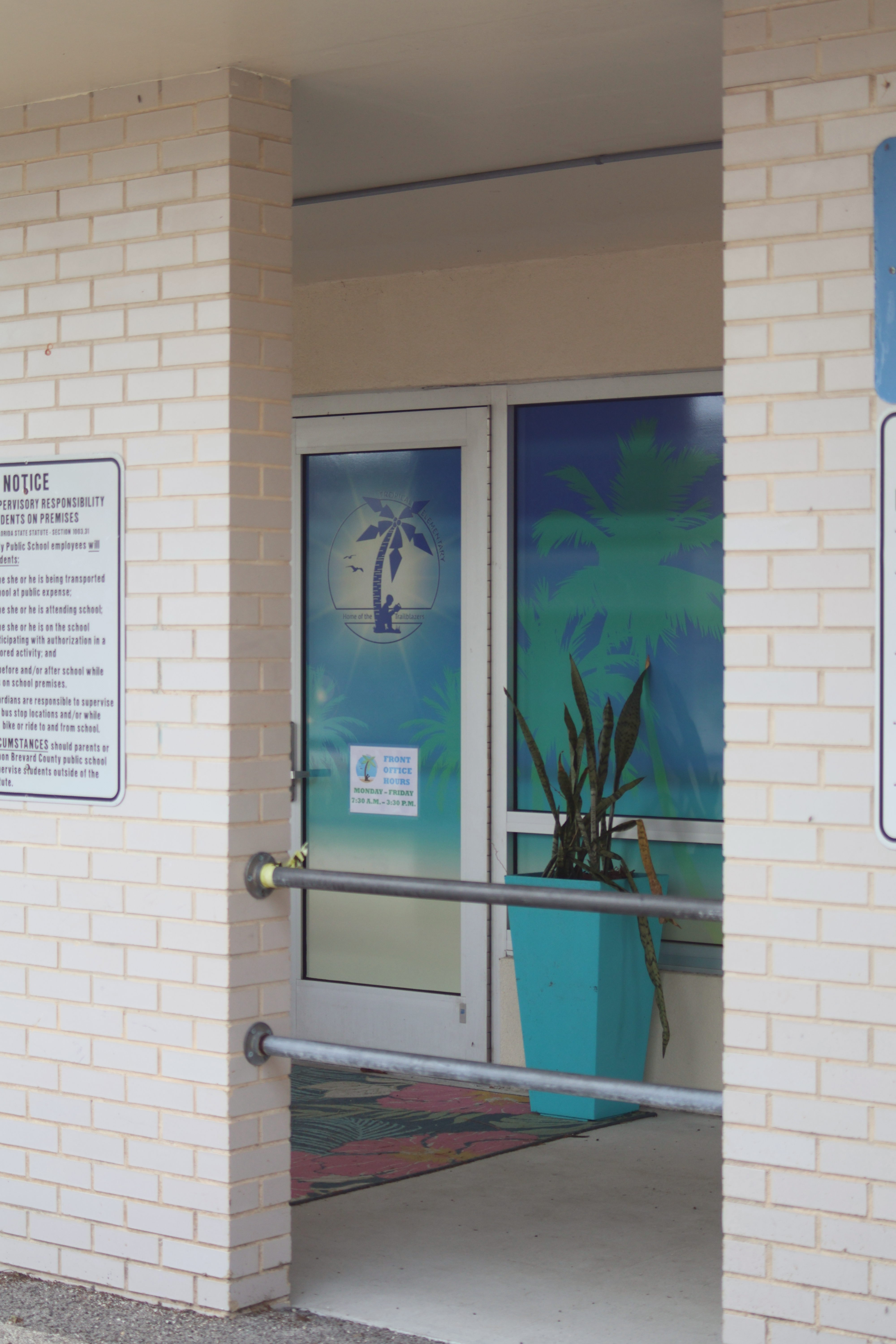
An entrance to Tropical Elementary

Merritt Island has several schools.

Public schools are operated by Brevard Public Schools:

- MILA Elementary
- Tropical Elementary
- Audubon Elementary
- Robert Louis Stevenson School of the Arts
- Lewis Carroll Elementary
- Gardendale Elementary (Closed since 2014)
- Thomas Jefferson Middle School
- Edgewood Junior/Senior High School
- Merritt Island High School

Private schools:

- Merritt Island Christian
- Calvary Chapel Christian School
- Brevard Private Academy

== Library district ==
The Merritt Island Public Library, though a part of the Brevard County Library System, is a state-designated special library district. Since Merritt Island is an unincorporated area of Brevard County, in 1965 the area applied for, and was designated, a special library district under Chapter 65-1289 by the Florida Legislature. In 2005, the Florida House of Representatives codified all special acts and amendments, in regards to the Merritt Island Public Library District, under HB 1079.

== Infrastructure ==
=== Roads ===
The residential areas of Merritt Island, East and West Merritt Island, are only accessible by causeway or drawbridge at all points. The island is linked by causeways, SR 520 (Merritt Island Causeway), State Road 404 (Pineda Causeway), State Road 405, State Road 406, and SR 528, to the barrier island to its east and the mainland to the west. Mathers Bridge connects the southernmost area to the barrier island.

SR 3, a four-lane highway, connects the Kennedy Space Center for workers from the more densely populated central and southern sections of the island.

=== Sewage ===
The lift station near the Pineda Causeway was built to handle 9,000,000 US gal (34,000,000 L) per day. It became overloaded after Hurricane Irma in 2017. Trucks were used to dispose of the excess which rose to 12,000,000 US gal (45,000,000 L) daily.

=== Airports ===
Merritt Island Airport is a public general aviation airport located on South Merritt Island and run by the Titusville-Cocoa (TICO) Airport Authority.

== Landmarks ==
- J. R. Field Homestead
- Hacienda del Sol, large historic agricultural estate on South Merritt Island (home still exists, property is now a private estate)
- Haulover Canal
- Dr. George E. Hill House
- Kennedy Space Center
- Merritt Island Airport
- Merritt Island (Canaveral) Barge Canal
- Merritt Island Dragon
- Merritt Island National Wildlife Refuge
- Kiwanis Island Park
- Merritt Island Rotary Park Nature Trail and Center
- Pine Island Conservation Area, 950 acres (380 ha) preserve. Pine Island contains Sams House, built in 1875. It is Brevard's oldest standing structure.
- Old St. Luke's Episcopal Church and Cemetery
- Ulumay Wildlife Sanctuary
- Futch Cove on Banana Creek (location of Apollo/Saturn Visitors Center)
- Merritt Square Mall

== Notable people ==
- Tim DeMorat, football player
- Arias Deukmedjian, racing driver
- Taylor Jordan, baseball player
- Travis Kittleson, racing driver
- Will Perdue, professional basketball player, member of four NBA championship-winning teams
- Clint Hurdle, professional baseball player and manager

== See also ==
- List of Cape Canaveral and Merritt Island launch sites

Town Merritt Island Town Merritt Island Newspaper
