= Arnott Air Suspension Products =

Automobile parts company in Merritt Island, Florida

- Company type: Private Company
- Industry: Automotive Aftermarket
- Founded: 1989
- Headquarters: Merritt Island, Florida, USA
- Key people: Adam Arnott (Co-Founder)
- Products: Air Suspension Products
- Number of employees: More than 100
- Website: www.arnottindustries.com

Arnott Air Suspension Products is an American privately held corporation headquartered in Merritt Island, Florida. Arnott develops and sells aftermarket automotive air suspension products for luxury cars, trucks, and SUVs.

== History ==
Arnott Air Suspension Products was founded in 1989 in Punta Gorda, Florida by Donald Arnott after his son, Adam, remanufactured an air spring for his father's car in the family garage. The part not only worked well but the father and son team soon found, it also filled a growing need for affordable replacement air suspension products. Before long, Adam and his father Don were traveling across Florida, providing air suspension repairs for others. Adam Arnott manages the company today.

== Products ==
Arnott Air Suspension Products sells automotive aftermarket air suspension products and accessories for American and foreign luxury cars, trucks, and SUVs. These products include:

- Air springs
- Arnott designed new air suspension struts
- Remanufactured OE air suspension strut and shock assemblies,
- Coil spring conversion kits,
- Compressors and dryers.
- Valve blocks
- Adjustable air suspension products for motorcycles

== Sales and distribution ==
Until 2017 Arnott Air Suspension Products sold automotive air suspension products online from its website. Currently Arnott products are available through a network of automotive aftermarket resellers including warehouse distributors, installers, jobbers, parts stores, and online retailers.

In addition to its Merritt Island, FL location, Arnott has Northeast, Central, and Western U.S. regional distribution centers, a Canadian distribution facility, and in early 2014 Arnott opened a Sales, Manufacturing and Distribution operation in the Netherlands to provide local support for the European Union, Middle East and Africa.
