= Turkey Creek Township =

Turkey Creek Township may refer to:

- Turkey Creek Township, Stone County, Arkansas
- Turkey Creek Township, Kosciusko County, Indiana
- Turkey Creek Township, Barber County, Kansas
- Turkey Creek Township, Franklin County, Nebraska, in Franklin County, Nebraska
- Turkey Creek Township, Harlan County, Nebraska

== See also ==
- Turkey Creek (disambiguation)
