= Turkey Creek (Cuivre River tributary) =

Stream in the US state of Missouri

Coordinates: 39.009489°N 91.113202°W

Turkey Creek is a stream in Lincoln County in the U.S. state of Missouri. It is a tributary of Cuivre River.

Turkey Creek was so named on account of wild turkeys in the area.

== See also ==
- List of rivers of Missouri
