= Roberson Creek (Haw River tributary) =

Stream in North Carolina, USA

Roberson Creek Tributary to Haw River
- Location of Roberson Creek mouth Roberson Creek (Haw River tributary) (the United States)

Location
- Country: United States
- State: North Carolina
- County: Chatham
- City: Pittsboro

Physical characteristics
- Source: divide between Roberson Creek and Rocky River
  - location: about 0.5 miles northeast of Round Top Mountain
  - coordinates: 35°42′04″N 079°13′34″W
  - elevation: 460 ft (140 m)
- Mouth: Haw River
  - location: B. Everett Jordan Lake
  - coordinates: 35°42′09″N 079°05′02″W
  - elevation: 217 ft (66 m)
- Length: 11.81 mi (19.01 km)
- Basin size: 28.61 square miles (74.1 km^{2})
- Discharge
  - location: Haw River
  - average: 33.00 cu ft/s (0.934 m^{3}/s) at mouth with Haw River

Basin features
- Progression: Haw River → Cape Fear River → Atlantic Ocean
- River system: Haw River
- Tributaries
  - left: unnamed tributaries
  - right: Turkey Creek
- Bridges: Alston Chapel Road, NC 902, US 15, Hanks Chapel Road

Roberson Creek is a 11.81 mi (19.01 km) long 3rd order tributary to the Haw River in Chatham County, North Carolina.

== Variant names ==
According to the Geographic Names Information System, it has also been known historically as:

- Robeson Creek

== Course ==
Roberson Creek rises about 0.5 miles northeast of Round Top Mountain in Chatham County and then flows east to the Haw River at B. Everett Jordan Lake. Roberson Creek makes up one of the arms of the lake.

== Watershed ==
Roberson Creek drains 28.61 square miles (74.1 km^{2}) of area, receives about 47.4 in/year of precipitation, and has a wetness index of 413.14 and is about 70% forested.

== See also ==
- List of rivers of North Carolina

== Additional images ==
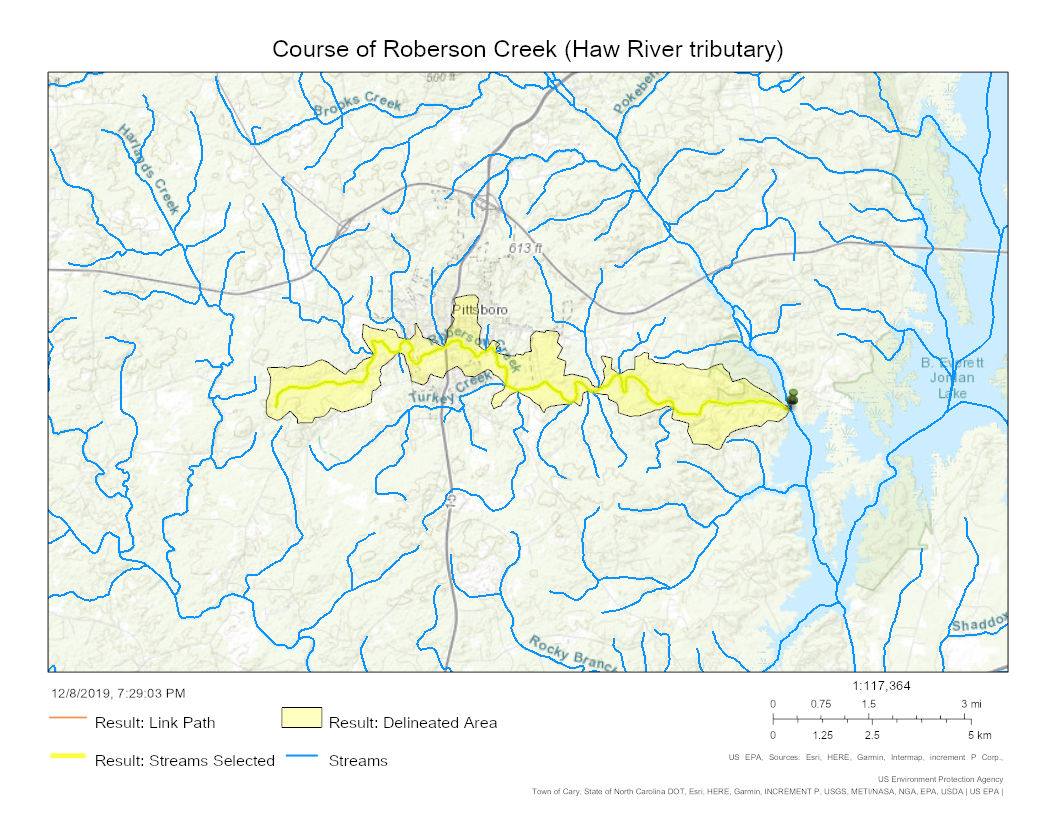
Course of Roberson Creek (Haw River tributary) in Chatham County, North Carolina

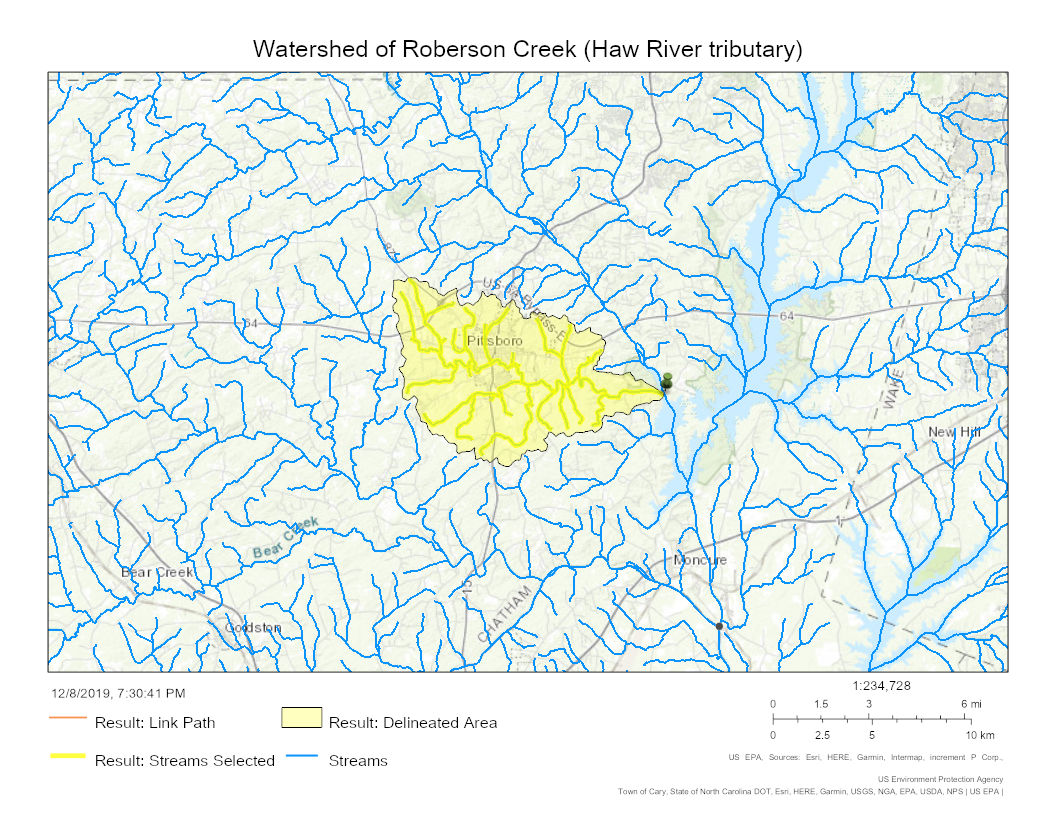
Watershed of Roberson Creek (Haw River tributary) in Chatham County, North Carolina
