= Turkey Creek (Ditch Creek tributary) =

Stream in the American state of Missouri

Location
- Country: United States
- State: Missouri
- County: Washington

Physical characteristics
- Source
  - coordinates: 38°11′16″N 90°46′10″W

Turkey Creek is a stream in Washington County in the U.S. state of Missouri. It is a tributary of Ditch Creek.

Turkey Creek, historically called "Turkey Branch", was so named on account of wild turkeys in the area.

== See also ==
- List of rivers of Missouri
