= Turkey Creek (Indian Creek tributary) =

Stream in Georgia, U.S.

Coordinates: 33°33′58″N 85°15′13″W

Turkey Creek is a stream in the U.S. state of Georgia. It is a tributary to Indian Creek.

Turkey Creek was so named for the wild turkeys near its course. A variant name is "Big Turkey Creek".
