= Turkey Creek (Roberson Creek tributary) =

Stream in North Carolina, USA

Turkey Creek Tributary to Roberson Creek
- Location of Turkey Creek mouth Turkey Creek (Roberson Creek tributary) (the United States)

Location
- Country: United States
- State: North Carolina
- County: Chatham

Physical characteristics
- Source: Rocky River divide
  - location: about 3 miles southwest of Pittsboro, North Carolina
  - coordinates: 35°41′47″N 079°12′51″W
  - elevation: 455 ft (139 m)
- Mouth: Roberson Creek
  - location: about 1 southeast of Pittsboro, North Carolina
  - coordinates: 35°42′25″N 079°09′40″W
  - elevation: 318 ft (97 m)
- Length: 3.99 mi (6.42 km)
- Basin size: 4.55 square miles (11.8 km^{2})
- Discharge
  - location: Roberson Creek
  - average: 5.64 cu ft/s (0.160 m^{3}/s) at mouth with Roberson Creek

Basin features
- Progression: northeast
- River system: Haw River
- Tributaries
  - left: unnamed tributaries
  - right: unnamed tributaries
- Bridges: Sanford Road, Moncure-Pittsboro Road

Turkey Creek is a 3.99 mi (6.42 km) long 2nd order tributary to Roberson Creek in Chatham County, North Carolina, United States

== Course ==
Turkey Creek rises about 3 miles southwest of Pittsboro, North Carolina in Chatham County and then flows northeast to Roberson Creek joining about 1 mile southeast of Pittsboro.

== Watershed ==
Turkey Creek drains an area of 4.55 square miles (11.8 km^{2}), which receives about 47.4 inches per year (120 cm/year) of precipitation, has a wetness index of 429.51 and is about 67% forested.
