= Turkey Creek Sanctuary =

Nature reserve in Palm Bay, Brevard County, Florida, United States

Coordinates: 28°0′59.8″N 80°36′14.6″W

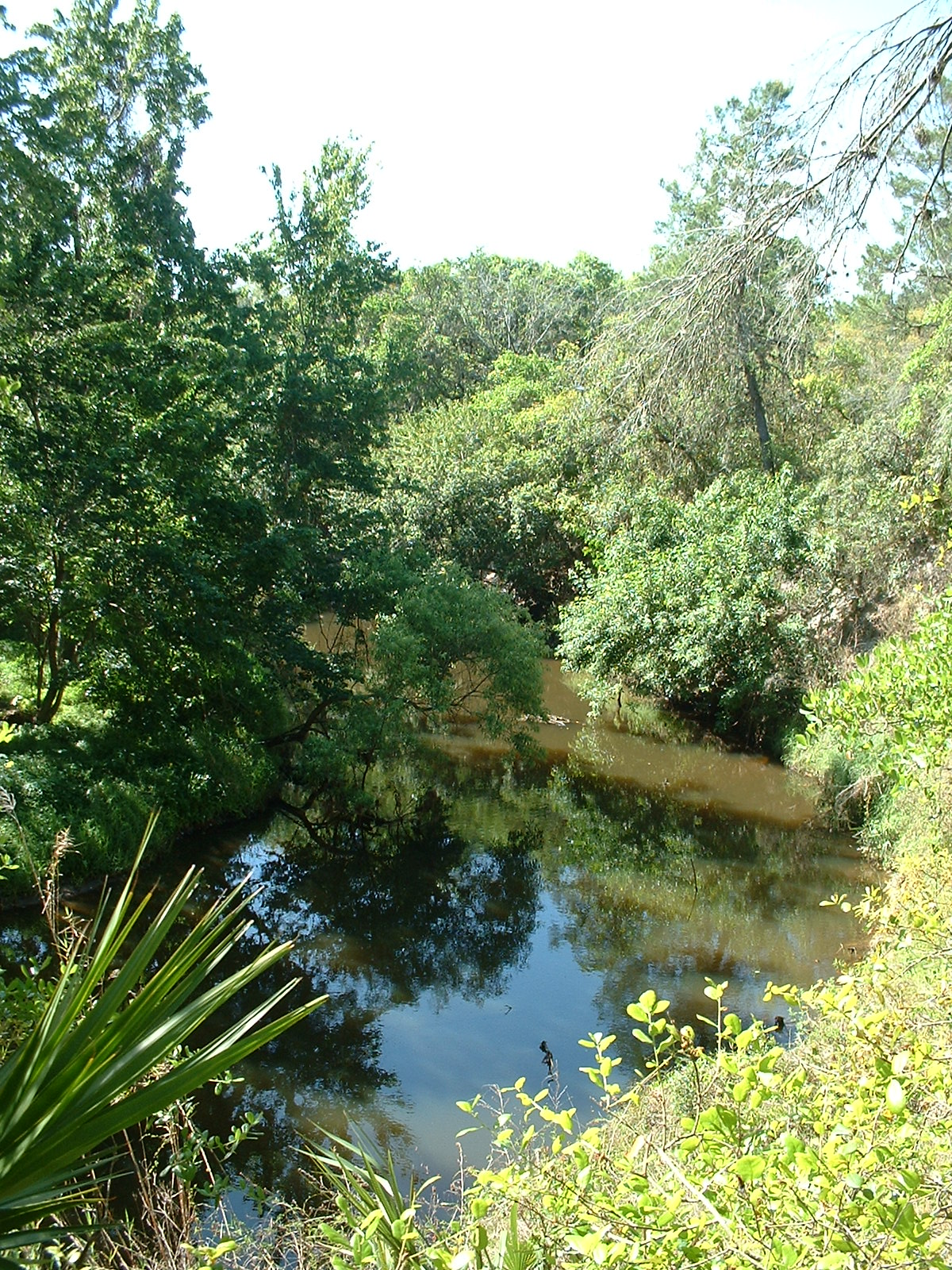
Turkey Creek from within the Sanctuary

The Turkey Creek Sanctuary is a small nature reserve in Palm Bay in Brevard County, Florida, and incorporates salty hammock and sand pine ridge habitats. It has 1.85 miles (3 km) of boardwalk paths and 1.5 miles (2.4 km) of jogging trails through native forest to Turkey Creek, an excellent site for seeing birds, turtles, manatees, alligators as well as other local wildlife. The creek is an important breeding ground for both salt and fresh water fish and is accessible via a canoe deck. The Sanctuary is part of the East Florida section of the Great Florida Birding Trail.

The property was donated to the Florida Audubon Society and the city of Palm Bay in 1978, and fundraising to conserve the area began in 1981. By 1994 113 acres (46 ha) were protected by the voluntary management committee. The park is open daily, from 7am to sunset.

It occasionally is threatened by environmental concerns. Heavy rains in September 2014 caused partially treated wastewater to spill into Turkey Creek.

The Margaret Hames Nature Center was opened in 1992 and offers environmental education programs, including nature day camps.
