= Turkey Creek (Hardin County, Tennessee) =

- Location within Tennessee Location within the United States

Physical characteristics
- Source
  - coordinates: 35.1956358°N 88.0153079°W
- Mouth
  - coordinates: 35.2486915°N 88.2036462°W

Turkey Creek is a stream in the U.S. state of Tennessee. It is a tributary to Horse Creek.

Turkey Creek was named for the wild turkeys near its course.
