= Turkey Creek (South Dakota) =

Stream in South Dakota, U.S.

Coordinates: 42°56′19″N 97°10′42″W

Turkey Creek is a stream in the U.S. state of South Dakota.

Turkey Creek was named after the wild turkeys in the area.

== See also ==
- List of rivers of South Dakota
