= Turkey Creek (Elk Fork Salt River tributary) =

Stream in Missouri, USA

Coordinates: 39.427817°N 91.989615°W

Turkey Creek (also called Turkey Branch) is a stream in Monroe County in the U.S. state of Missouri. It is a tributary of Elk Fork Salt River.

Turkey Creek was so named on account of wild turkeys near its course.

== See also ==
- List of rivers of Missouri
