= Turkey Creek (Indian River tributary) =

Stream in Florida, United States of America

Coordinates: 28°2′1″N 80°34′46″W

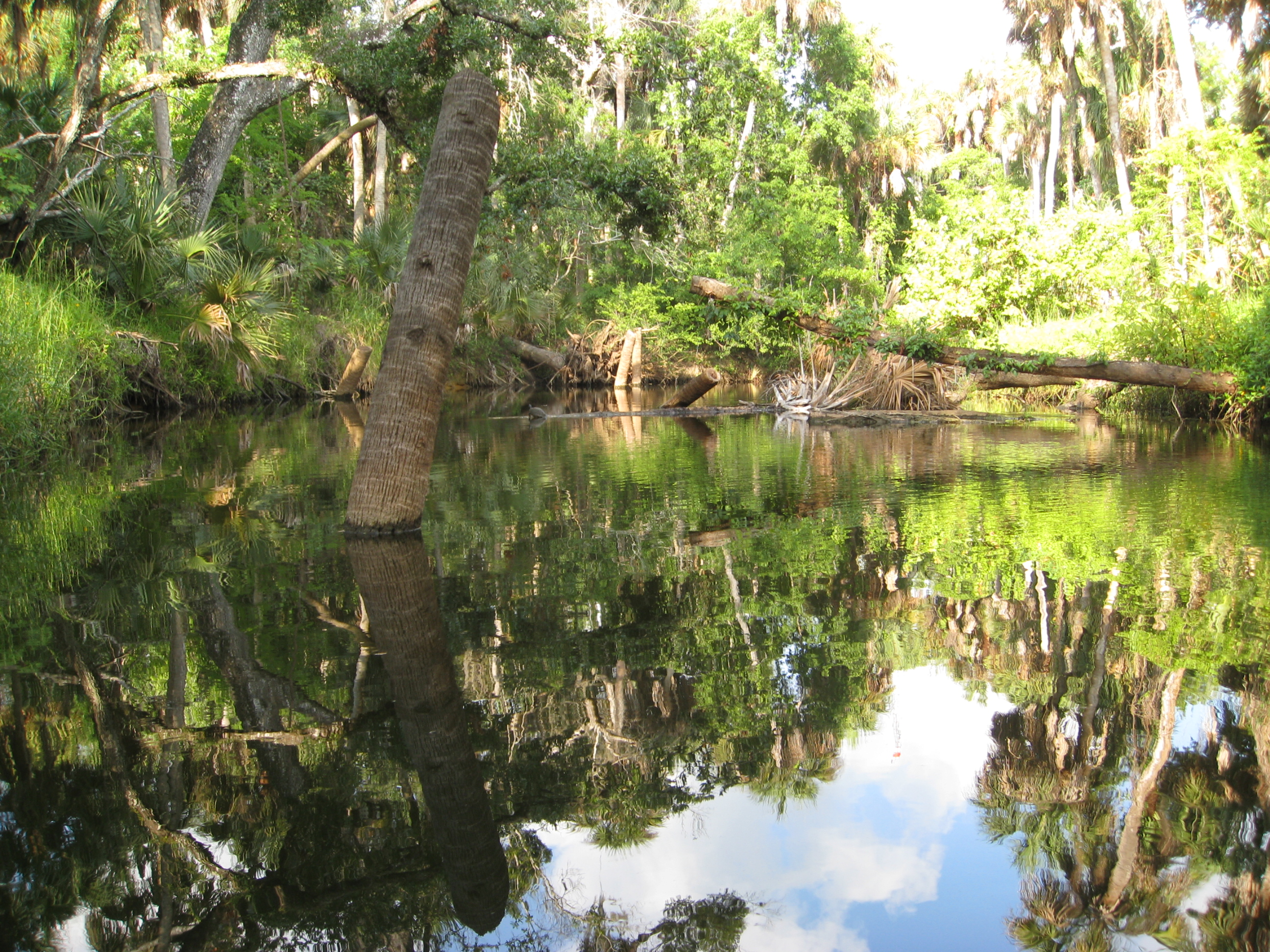
- Turkey Creek from within the Sanctuary

Location
- Country: United States

Physical characteristics
- Source
  - location: Malabar & Palm Bay, Florida
- Mouth
  - location: Indian River

Turkey Creek is a 4.1-mile-long (6.6 km) stream in Malabar and Palm Bay, Florida, United States. It is a tributary of the Indian River, with its mouth in the bay of Palm Bay near Palm Bay Pointe.

== See also ==
- Indian River (Florida)
- Palm Bay, Florida
- Turkey Creek Sanctuary
