= Palm Bay (Florida) =

Bay in Palm Bay, Florida, United States

Coordinates: 28°02′15″N 80°34′47″W

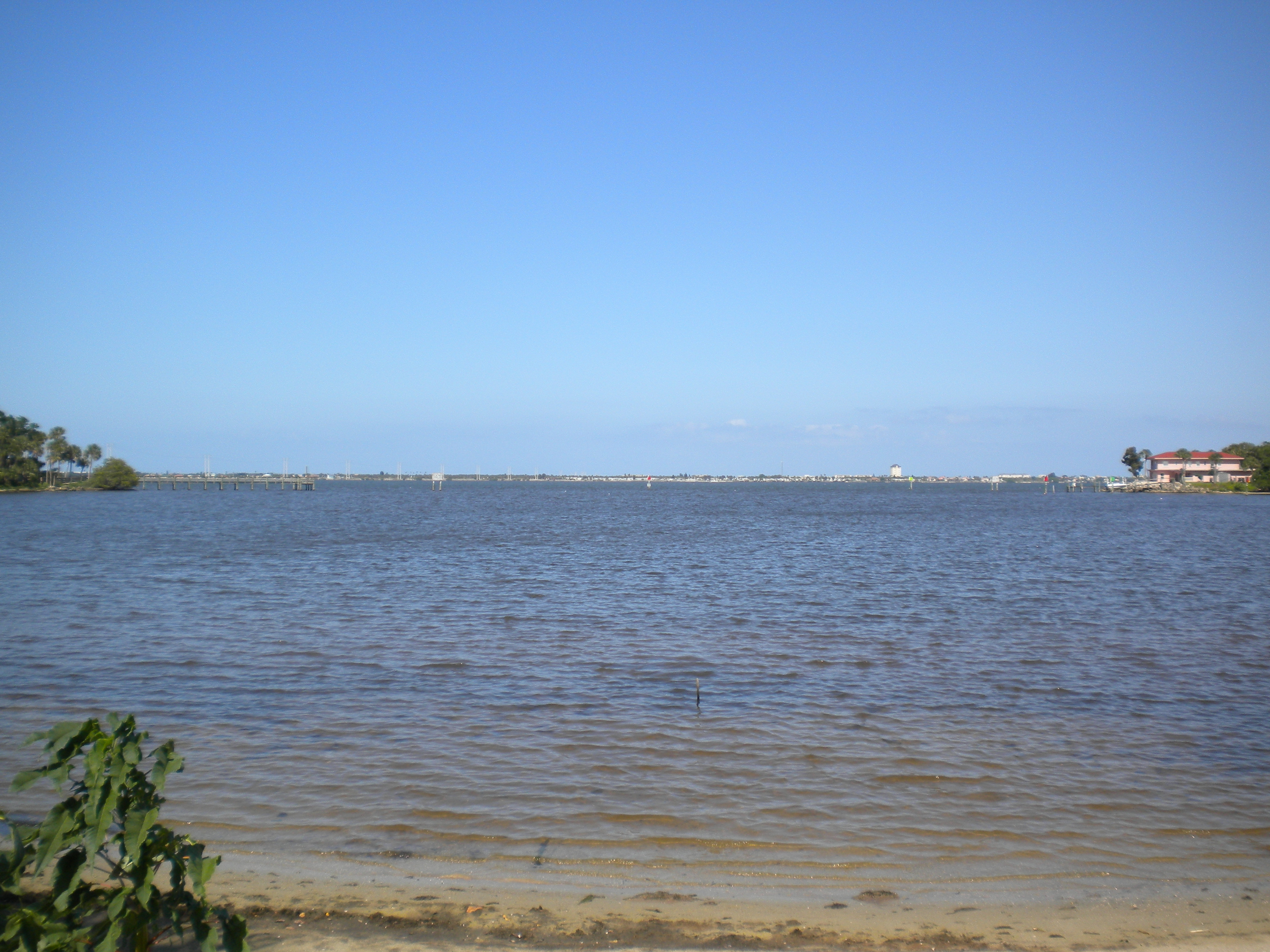
Palm Bay from U.S. Route 1

Palm Bay is a bay located in Palm Bay, Florida, United States and is bordered to the south by the Palm Bay Pointe peninsula. It is an estuary of Indian River, and Turkey Creek drains into Palm Bay. Pioneers initially settled in Palm Bay as they moved into the area in the late 19th century. The city of Palm Bay received its name from this bay.
