= Turkey Creek (Johnson County, Iowa) =

Stream in Johnson County, Iowa, U.S.

Coordinates: 41.730293°N 91.521281°W

Turkey Creek is a stream in Johnson County, Iowa, in the United States.

Turkey Creek was so named in the 1830s because a hunting ground for wild turkeys was located there.

== See also ==
- List of rivers of Iowa
