= Turkey Creek (Ohio River tributary) =

Stream in Ohio, U.S.

Coordinates: 38°41′08″N 83°04′41″W

Turkey Creek is a stream in the U.S. state of Ohio. It is a tributary of the Ohio River.

Turkey Creek was named for the abundance of wild turkeys in the area.

== See also ==
- List of rivers of Ohio
