= Allenhurst, Florida =

Coordinates: 28.737622°N 80.755735°W

Allenhurst was a community in Brevard County. The town was demolished and residents were forced to move after the building of the Kennedy Space Center along with 12 other communities.

== See also ==
- List of ghost towns in Florida
