= Indian River (Florida) =

Waterway in Florida, United States

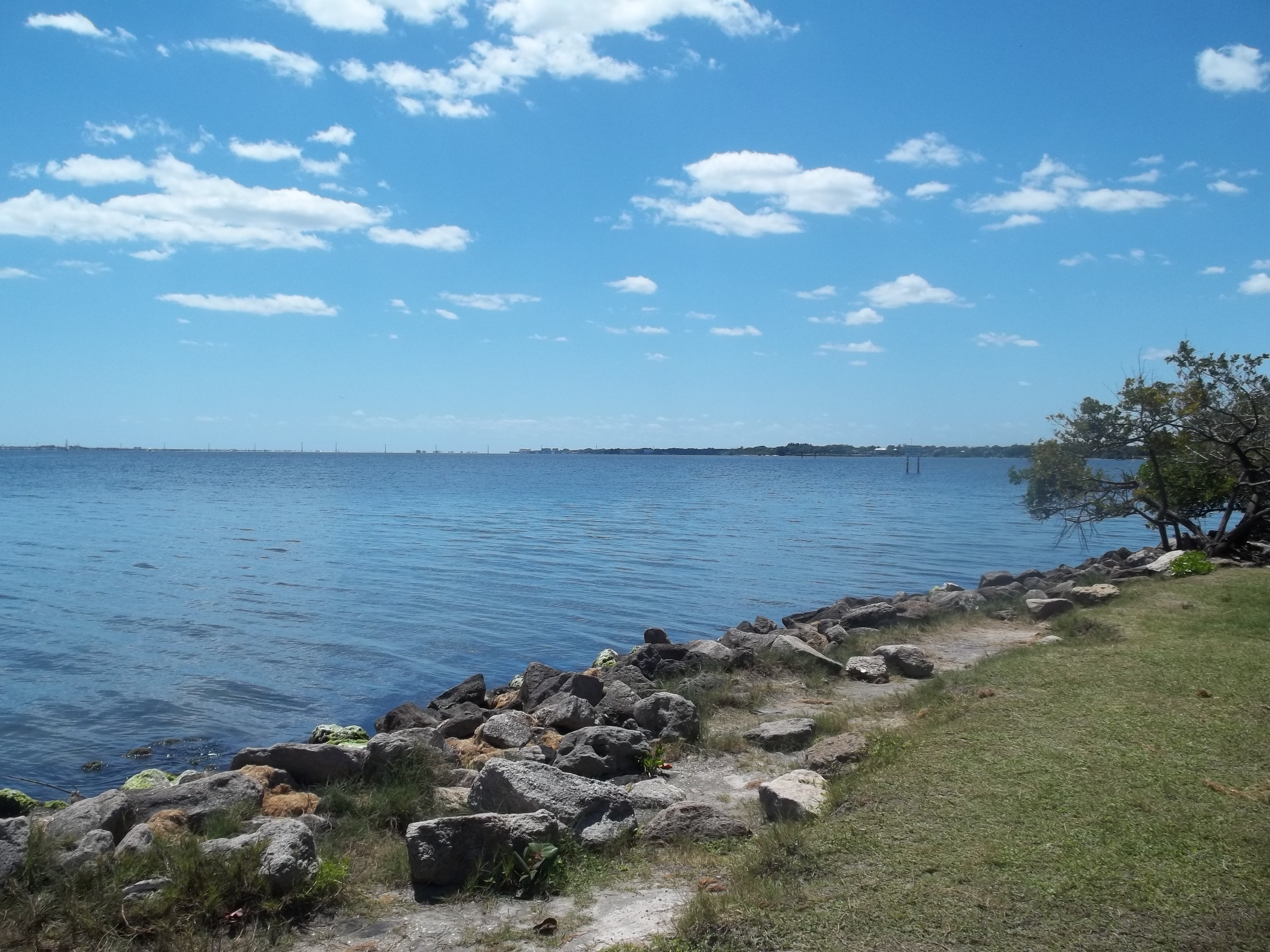
- Indian River at Melbourne

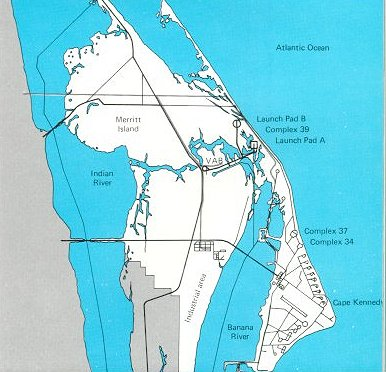
- NASA map showing Indian River on left

Location
- Country: United States
- State: Florida

Physical characteristics
- Source
  - location: Ponce de Leon inlet
  - elevation: 0 ft (0 m)
- Mouth
  - location: St. Lucie Inlet
  - coordinates: 27°09'58"N, 80°09'24"W
  - elevation: 0 ft (0 m)
- Length: 121 mi (195 km)

The Indian River is a 121-mile (195 km) long brackish-water lagoon on Florida's eastern Atlantic coast. It is part of the Indian River Lagoon system, which in turn forms part of the Atlantic Intracoastal Waterway. It was originally called Río de Ais by the Spanish, after the Ais tribe who lived along the east coast of what is now Florida.

The Indian River extends southward from the Ponce de Leon Inlet in New Smyrna Beach, across the Haulover Canal, and along the western shore of Merritt Island. The Banana River flows into the Indian River on the island's south side, at which point the Indian River continues southward to St. Lucie Inlet and Jupiter Inlet. At certain times of the year the presence of bridges restricts the natural movement and flow of Gracilaria (a genus of red algae), thus resulting in a localized odor of hydrogen sulfide.

== Tributaries and estuaries ==
Tributaries of the Indian River include the Merritt Island Barge Canal, the C-54 Canal, Crane Creek, the Eau Gallie River, Horse Creek, Mullet Creek, St. Sebastian River, St. Lucie River, Sykes Creek, and Turkey Creek. An estuary of Indian River is Palm Bay. The St. Johns-Indian River Barge Canal was proposed in the 1960s to provide a water link to the St. Johns River, but was cancelled in the early 1970s.
